= List of least concern perciform fishes =

There are 3878 species and 18 subspecies in the order Perciformes assessed as least concern by the International Union for Conservation of Nature.

== Gouramis ==
- Slender betta (Betta bellica)
- Peaceful betta (Betta imbellis)
- Betta prima
- Paradise fish (Macropodus opercularis)
- Giant gourami (Osphronemus goramy)
- Eyespot gourami (Parasphaerichthys ocellatus)
- Spiketail paradise fish (Pseudosphromenus cupanus)
- Honey gourami (Trichogaster chuna)
- Striped gourami (Trichogaster fasciata)
- Thick-lipped gourami (Trichogaster labiosus)
- Dwarf gourami (Trichogaster lalius)
- Moonlight gourami (Trichopodus microlepis)
- Snakeskin gourami (Trichopodus pectoralis)
- Three spot gourami (Trichopodus trichopterus)
- Pygmy gourami (Trichopsis pumila)
- Mekong croaking gourami (Trichopsis schalleri)
- Croaking gourami (Trichopsis vittata)

== Cichlids ==
Species

- Aequidens patricki
- Alticorpus macrocleithrum
- Alticorpus mentale
- Alticorpus pectinatum
- Alticorpus peterdaviesi
- Alticorpus profundicula
- Altolamprologus compressiceps
- Pearl cichlid (Amphilophus rhytisma)
- Andinoacara blombergi
- Andinoacara latifrons
- Anomalochromis thomasi
- Apistogramma allpahuayo
- Apistogramma baenschi
- Apistogramma barlowi
- Cruzi (Apistogramma cruzi)
- Apistogramma eremnopyge
- Apistogramma gephyra
- Apistogramma linkei
- Apistogramma luelingi
- Apistogramma martini
- Panduro (Apistogramma panduro)
- Apistogramma similis
- Apistogramma urteagai
- Archocentrus spinosissimus
- Aristochromis christyi
- Alluaud's haplo (Astatoreochromis alluaudi)
- Bluelip haplo (Astatoreochromis straeleni)
- Astatoreochromis vanderhorsti
- Astatotilapia burtoni
- Eastern river bream (Astatotilapia calliptera)
- Astatotilapia paludinosa
- Astatotilapia stappersii
- Nkhomo-benga peacock (Aulonocara baenschi)
- Aulonocara brevinidus
- Aulonocara gertrudae
- Aulonocara guentheri
- Fairy cichlid (Aulonocara jacobfreibergi)
- Aulonocara rostratum
- Greenface aulonocara (Aulonocara saulosi)
- Aulonocara stonemani
- Flavescent peacock (Aulonocara stuartgranti)
- Aulonocranus dewindti
- Baileychromis centropomoides
- Bathybates fasciatus
- Bathybates ferox
- Bathybates graueri
- Bathybates hornii
- Bathybates leo
- Bathybates minor
- Bathybates vittatus
- Benthochromis melanoides
- Benthochromis tricoti
- Giant cichlid (Boulengerochromis microlepis)
- Buccochromis heterotaenia
- Slender tail hap (Buccochromis lepturus)
- Stripeback hap (Buccochromis nototaenia)
- Buccochromis rhoadesii
- Buccochromis spectabilis
- Bujurquina apoparuana
- Bujurquina cordemadi
- Bujurquina eurhinus
- Bujurquina hophrys
- Bujurquina huallagae
- Bujurquina labiosa
- Bujurquina megalospilus
- Bujurquina moriorum
- Bujurquina syspilus
- Bujurquina tambopatae
- Bujurquina zamorensis
- Callochromis macrops
- Callochromis melanostigma
- Callochromis pleurospilus
- Caprichromis liemi
- Caprichromis orthognathous
- Caquetaia myersi
- Cardiopharynx schoutedeni
- Chaetobranchus semifasciatus
- Chalinochromis brichardi
- Champsochromis caeruleus
- Champsochromis spilorhynchus
- Malawi thicklip (Cheilochromis euchilus)
- Buzi river bream (Chetia brevicauda)
- Canary kurper (Chetia flaviventris)
- Chetia gracilis
- Chilochromis duponti
- Chilotilapia rhoadesii
- Chromidotilapia guntheri
- Chromidotilapia kingsleyae
- Chromidotilapia mamonekenei
- Chromidotilapia melaniae
- Chromidotilapia mrac
- Chromidotilapia schoutedeni
- Cichlasoma atromaculatum
- Cichlasoma ornatum
- Congochromis dimidiatus
- Congochromis sabinae
- Congochromis squamiceps
- Copadichromis azureus
- Haplochromis borleyi redfin (Copadichromis borleyi)
- Copadichromis chrysonotus
- Copadichromis cyaneus
- Copadichromis eucinostomus
- Copadichromis flavimanus
- Copadichromis ilesi
- Copadichromis jacksoni
- Copadichromis likomae
- Copadichromis mloto
- Copadichromis pleurostigma
- Copadichromis pleurostigmoides
- Copadichromis prostoma
- Copadichromis quadrimaculatus
- Verduya's hap (Copadichromis trimaculatus)
- Corematodus shiranus
- Corematodus taeniatus
- Crenicichla anthurus
- Crenicichla cincta
- Pike cichlid (Crenicichla lepidota)
- Crenicichla macrophthalma
- Crenicichla sedentaria
- Ctenochromis benthicola
- Ctenochromis horei
- Blackspot climbing perch (Ctenopharynx intermedius)
- Ctenopharynx nitidus
- Ctenopharynx pictus
- Cunningtonia longiventralis
- Cyathochromis obliquidens
- Featherfin cichlid (Cyathopharynx furcifer)
- Cyclopharynx fwae
- Cyclopharynx schwetzi
- Cynotilapia afra
- Cyphotilapia frontosa
- Cyprichromis leptosoma
- Cyrtocara moorii
- Malawi eyebiter (Dimidiochromis compressiceps)
- Ncheni type haplochromis (Dimidiochromis dimidiatus)
- Dimidiochromis kiwinge
- Haplochromis sunset (Dimidiochromis strigatus)
- Diplotaxodon aeneus
- Diplotaxodon apogon
- Diplotaxodon argenteus
- Diplotaxodon greenwoodi
- Diplotaxodon limnothrissa
- Diplotaxodon macrops
- Divandu albimarginatus
- Docimodus evelynae
- Docimodus johnstoni
- Eclectochromis lobochilus
- Eclectochromis ornatus
- Ectodus descampsii (Note: Listed by IUCN as Ectodus descampsi.)
- Orange chromide (Etroplus maculatus)
- Green chromide (Etroplus suratensis)
- Threespot torpedo (Exochochromis anagenys)
- Fossorochromis rostratus
- Genyochromis mento
- Geophagus brachybranchus
- Gephyrochromis lawsi
- Gephyrochromis moorii
- Gnathochromis permaxillaris
- Gnathochromis pfefferi
- Grammatotria lemairii
- Greenwoodochromis bellcrossi
- Greenwoodochromis christyi
- Guianacara oelemariensis
- Haplochromis angustifrons
- Haplochromis bakongo
- Haplochromis chilotes
- Haplochromis crebidens
- Haplochromis degeni
- Haplochromis eduardianus
- Haplochromis elegans
- Haplochromis flavus
- Haplochromis torpedo stripe (Haplochromis gracilior)
- Haplochromis graueri
- Velvet black (Haplochromis greenwoodi)
- Haplochromis insidiae
- Haplochromis kamiranzovu
- Haplochromis laparogramma
- Haplochromis limax
- Haplochromis lucullae
- Haplochromis macconneli
- Haplochromis macropsoides
- Haplochromis mbipi
- Haplochromis microchrysomelas
- Haplochromis mylodon
- Haplochromis nigripinnis
- Haplochromis nigroides
- Haplochromis nyererei
- Haplochromis occultidens
- Haplochromis oligacanthus
- Haplochromis olivaceus
- Haplochromis omnicaeruleus
- Haplochromis pappenheimi
- Haplochromis paropius
- Haplochromis paucidens
- Haplochromis pundamilia
- Haplochromis pyrrhocephalus
- Haplochromis riponianus
- Haplochromis rubescens
- Haplochromis rubripinnis
- Haplochromis rudolfianus
- Haplochromis rufocaudalis
- Haplochromis rufus
- Haplochromis scheffersi
- Haplochromis schubotzi
- Haplochromis schubotziellus
- Haplochromis squamipinnis
- Haplochromis stigmatogenys
- Haplochromis tanaos
- Haplochromis taurinus
- Haplochromis turkanae
- Haplochromis vittatus
- Haplochromis xenognathus
- Haplotaxodon microlepis
- Hemibates stenosoma
- African jewelfish (Hemichromis bimaculatus)
- Banded jewel cichlid (Hemichromis elongatus)
- Hemichromis exsul
- Hemichromis fasciatus
- Hemichromis letourneuxi
- Hemichromis lifalili
- Hemichromis stellifer
- Hemitaeniochromis urotaenia
- Giant haplochromis (Hemitilapia oxyrhynchus)
- Texas cichlid (Herichthys cyanoguttatus)
- Heroina isonycterina
- Heterochromis multidens
- Julidochromis dickfeldi
- Julidochromis marlieri
- Golden julie (Julidochromis ornatus)
- Convict julie (Julidochromis regani)
- Masked julie (Julidochromis transcriptus)
- Blue mbuna (Labeotropheus fuelleborni)
- Scrapermouth mbuna (Labeotropheus trewavasae)
- Blue streak hap (Labidochromis caeruleus)
- Labidochromis maculicauda
- Labidochromis mathotho
- Labidochromis shiranus
- Labidochromis textilis
- Labidochromis vellicans
- Lamprologus callipterus
- Lamprologus congoensis
- Lamprologus lemairii
- Lamprologus mocquardi
- Lamprologus ocellatus
- Lamprologus ornatipinnis
- Lamprologus signatus
- Lepidiolamprologus cunningtoni
- Lepidiolamprologus elongatus
- Lepidiolamprologus profundicola
- Lestradea perspicax
- Lestradea stappersii
- Lethrinops albus
- Lethrinops altus
- Lethrinops argenteus
- Golden sand-eater (Lethrinops auritus)
- Lethrinops christyi
- Greenface sandsifter (Lethrinops furcifer)
- Lethrinops gossei
- Lethrinops leptodon
- Lethrinops lethrinus
- Lethrinops longimanus
- Lethrinops lunaris
- Lethrinops macrochir
- Lethrinops rounded head (Lethrinops marginatus)
- Littletooth sandeater (Lethrinops microstoma)
- Lethrinops red flush (Lethrinops parvidens)
- Lethrinops polli
- Lethrinops turneri
- Malawi gar (Lichnochromis acuticeps)
- Limnochromis abeelei
- Spangled cichlid (Limnochromis auritus)
- Limnochromis staneri
- Limnotilapia dardennii
- Lobochilotes labiatus
- Maylandia barlowi
- Maylandia crabro
- Maylandia elegans
- Maylandia fainzilberi
- Maylandia livingstonii
- Zebra mbuna (Maylandia zebra)
- Golden mbuna (Melanochromis auratus)
- Melanochromis benetos
- Melanochromis brevis
- Melanochromis labrosus
- Melanochromis melanopterus
- Melanochromis robustus
- Melanochromis simulans
- Purple mbuna (Melanochromis vermivorus)
- Mesonauta mirificus
- Mylochromis anaphyrmus
- Mylochromis balteatus
- Mylochromis epichorialis
- Mylochromis ericotaenia
- Mylochromis formosus
- Mylochromis guentheri
- Golden mola hap (Mylochromis incola)
- Mylochromis labidodon
- Basket hap (Mylochromis lateristriga)
- Haplochromis yellow black line (Mylochromis melanonotus)
- Mylochromis melanotaenia
- Mylochromis mola
- Softy hap (Mylochromis mollis)
- Mylochromis obtusus
- Mylochromis plagiotaenia
- Mylochromis semipalatus
- Roundtooth hap (Mylochromis sphaerodon)
- Mylochromis subocularis
- Naevochromis chrysogaster
- Nanochromis nudiceps
- Nanochromis parilus
- Nanochromis teugelsi
- Neolamprologus boulengeri
- Neolamprologus brevis
- Neolamprologus brichardi
- Neolamprologus caudopunctatus
- Neolamprologus crassus
- Neolamprologus falcicula
- Neolamprologus fasciatus
- Neolamprologus furcifer
- Neolamprologus gracilis
- Neolamprologus hecqui
- Neolamprologus leleupi
- Neolamprologus leloupi
- Neolamprologus longior
- Neolamprologus meeli
- Neolamprologus modestus
- Neolamprologus mondabu
- Neolamprologus moorii
- Neolamprologus multifasciatus
- Neolamprologus mustax
- Neolamprologus niger
- Neolamprologus obscurus
- Neolamprologus petricola
- Neolamprologus pleuromaculatus
- Neolamprologus prochilus
- Neolamprologus pulcher
- Neolamprologus savoryi
- Neolamprologus sexfasciatus
- Neolamprologus splendens
- Fourspine cichlid (Neolamprologus tetracanthus)
- Neolamprologus toae
- Neolamprologus tretocephalus
- Nimbochromis fuscotaeniatus
- Nimbochromis linni
- Nimbochromis livingstonii
- Nimbochromis polystigma
- Nimbochromis venustus
- Nyassachromis breviceps
- Small green utaka (Nyassachromis leuciscus)
- Nyassachromis microcephalus
- Nyassachromis nigritaeniatus
- Nyassachromis purpurans
- Nyassachromis serenus
- Ophthalmotilapia boops
- Ophthalmotilapia heterodonta
- Ophthalmotilapia nasuta
- Ophthalmotilapia ventralis
- Oreochromis angolensis
- Oreochromis korogwe
- Oreochromis leucostictus
- Mweru tilapia (Oreochromis mweruensis)
- Black tilapia (Oreochromis placidus)
- Oreochromis schwebischi
- Oreochromis tanganicae
- Oreochromis upembae
- Orthochromis kalungwishiensis
- Cunene dwarf happy (Orthochromis machadoi)
- Orthochromis polyacanthus
- Orthochromis stormsi
- Orthochromis torrenticola
- Otopharynx argyrosoma
- Golden-margined hap (Otopharynx auromarginatus)
- Otopharynx brooksi
- Otopharynx decorus
- Royal blue hap (Otopharynx heterodon)
- Otopharynx ovatus
- Otopharynx selenurus
- Otopharynx speciosus
- Otopharynx tetraspilus
- Otopharynx tetrastigma
- Pallidochromis tokolosh
- Monarch cichlid (Parachromis friedrichsthalii)
- Paracyprichromis brieni
- Paracyprichromis nigripinnis
- Parananochromis caudifasciatus
- Parananochromis gabonicus
- Parananochromis longirostris
- Paretroplus tsimoly
- Pelmatochromis buettikoferi
- Pelmatochromis nigrofasciatus
- Pelvicachromis humilis
- Common krib (Pelvicachromis pulcher)
- Pelvicachromis taeniatus
- Perissodus microlepis
- Petrochromis famula
- Petrochromis fasciolatus
- Petrochromis orthognathus
- Petrochromis polyodon
- Threadfin cichlid (Petrochromis trewavasae)
- Petrotilapia genalutea
- Petrotilapia tridentiger
- Dwarf bream (Pharyngochromis acuticeps)
- Deep-water hap (Placidochromis electra)
- Placidochromis hennydaviesae
- Placidochromis johnstoni
- Placidochromis longimanus
- Super VC-10 hap (Placidochromis milomo)
- Placidochromis phenochilus
- Placidochromis stonemani
- Placidochromis subocularis
- Plecodus elaviae
- Plecodus multidentatus
- Plecodus paradoxus
- Plecodus straeleni
- Protomelas annectens
- Fenestratus (Protomelas fenestratus)
- One-and-a-half-stripe hap (Protomelas insignis)
- Protomelas kirkii
- Protomelas labridens
- Protomelas marginatus
- Protomelas pleurotaenia
- Protomelas similis
- Protomelas spilonotus
- Protomelas spilopterus
- Spindle hap (Protomelas taeniolatus)
- Protomelas triaenodon
- Egyptian mouthbrooder (Pseudocrenilabrus multicolor)
- Pseudocrenilabrus nicholsi
- Pseudosimochromis curvifrons
- Pseudotropheus lucerna
- Pseudotropheus macrophthalmus
- Pseudotropheus minutus
- Pseudotropheus perspicax
- Pindani (Pseudotropheus socolofi)
- Red top williamsi (Pseudotropheus williamsi)
- Pterochromis congicus
- Ptychochromis grandidieri
- Ptychochromis oligacanthus
- Reganochromis calliurus
- Rhamphochromis esox
- Rhamphochromis longiceps
- Rhamphochromis lucius
- Rhamphochromis macrophthalmus
- Rhamphochromis woodi
- Rainbow bream (Sargochromis carlottae)
- Sargochromis codringtonii
- Kunene bream (Sargochromis coulteri)
- Pink bream (Sargochromis giardi)
- Deepcheek bream (Sargochromis greenwoodi)
- Snaileater (Sargochromis mellandi)
- Sargochromis mortimeri
- Sarotherodon caudomarginatus
- Sarotherodon mvogoi
- Schwetzochromis neodon
- Electric blue hap (Sciaenochromis ahli)
- Sciaenochromis benthicola
- Sciaenochromis fryeri
- Sciaenochromis gracilis
- Electric blue kande (Sciaenochromis psammophilus)
- Sciaenochromis spilostichus
- Humpback largemouth (Serranochromis altus)
- Thinface cichlid (Serranochromis angusticeps)
- Longfin largemouth (Serranochromis longimanus)
- Purpleface largemouth (Serranochromis macrocephalus)
- Yellow-belly bream (Serranochromis robustus)
- Serranochromis spei
- Serranochromis stappersi
- Brownspot largemouth (Serranochromis thumbergi)
- Simochromis babaulti
- Simochromis diagramma
- Simochromis loocki
- Simochromis pleurospilus
- Spathodus erythrodon
- Spathodus marlieri
- Lionhead cichlid (Steatocranus casuarius)
- Steatocranus gibbiceps
- Steatocranus tinanti
- Stigmatochromis modestus
- Candle hap (Stigmatochromis pholidophorus)
- Stigmatochromis woodi
- Taeniochromis holotaenia
- Taeniolethrinops cyrtonotus
- Taeniolethrinops furcicauda
- Taeniolethrinops laticeps
- Taeniolethrinops praeorbitalis
- Tangachromis dhanisi
- Spotfin goby cichlid (Tanganicodus irsacae)
- Telmatochromis bifrenatus
- Telmatochromis brachygnathus
- Telmatochromis dhonti
- Telmatochromis temporalis
- Telmatochromis vittatus
- Thicklipped happy (Thoracochromis albolabris)
- Thoracochromis brauschi
- Namib happy (Thoracochromis buysi)
- Thoracochromis callichromus
- Thysochromis ansorgii
- Tilapia baloni
- Tilapia bilineata
- Tilapia brevimanus
- Tilapia buttikoferi
- Tilapia cabrae
- Tilapia cameronensis
- Tilapia congica
- Tilapia dageti
- Guinean tilapia (Tilapia guineensis)
- Tilapia louka
- Tilapia margaritacea
- Spotted tilapia (Tilapia mariae)
- Tilapia nyongana
- Redbreast tilapia (Tilapia rendalli)
- Okavango tilapia (Tilapia ruweti)
- Banded tilapia (Tilapia sparrmanii)
- Tilapia tholloni
- Tramitichromis brevis
- Tramitichromis intermedius
- Tramitichromis lituris
- Tramitichromis trilineatus
- Tramitichromis variabilis
- Trematocara caparti
- Trematocara kufferathi
- Trematocara macrostoma
- Trematocara marginatum
- Trematocara nigrifrons
- Trematocara stigmaticum
- Trematocara unimaculatum
- Trematocara variabile
- Trematocranus labifer
- Haplochromis placodon pointed head (Trematocranus microstoma)
- Trematocranus placodon
- Triglachromis otostigma
- Tropheops macrophthalmus
- Tropheops novemfasciatus
- Tropheus annectens
- Tropheus brichardi
- Tropheus kasabae
- Blunthead cichlid (Tropheus moorii)
- Tylochromis aristoma
- Hump-back bream (Tylochromis bangwelensis)
- Tylochromis intermedius
- Tylochromis jentinki
- Tylochromis labrodon
- Tylochromis lateralis
- Tylochromis leonensis
- Mweru hump-backed bream (Tylochromis mylodon)
- Tylochromis polylepis
- Tylochromis pulcher
- Tylochromis robertsi
- Tylochromis sudanensis
- Tylochromis variabilis
- Tyrannochromis macrostoma
- Tyrannochromis nigriventer
- Xenotilapia bathyphilus
- Xenotilapia boulengeri
- Xenotilapia caudofasciata
- Yellow sand cichlid (Xenotilapia flavipinnis)
- Xenotilapia leptura
- Xenotilapia longispinis
- Xenotilapia nigrolabiata
- Xenotilapia ochrogenys
- Xenotilapia ornatipinnis
- Xenotilapia sima
- Xenotilapia tenuidentata

Subspecies

- Rovuma tilapia (Oreochromis placidus placidus)
- Oreochromis placidus rovumae
- Oreochromis upembae malagarasi
- Dwarf Victoria mouthbrooder (Pseudocrenilabrus multicolor victoriae)
- Sarotherodon galilaeus boulengeri
- Galilaea tilapia (Sarotherodon galilaeus galilaeus)
- Upper Zambezi nembwe (Serranochromis robustus jallae)
- Serranochromis robustus robustus

== Percids ==
- Naked sand darter (Ammocrypta beanii)
- Florida sand darter (Ammocrypta bifascia)
- Southern sand darter (Ammocrypta meridiana)
- Eastern sand darter (Ammocrypta pellucida)
- Scaly sand darter (Ammocrypta vivax)
- Redspot darter (Etheostoma artesiae)
- Mud darter (Etheostoma asprigene)
- Cumberland snubnose darter (Etheostoma atripinne)
- Autumn darter (Etheostoma autumnale)
- Emerald darter (Etheostoma baileyi)
- Teardrop darter (Etheostoma barbouri)
- Splendid darter (Etheostoma barrenense)
- Corrugated darter (Etheostoma basilare)
- Orangefin darter (Etheostoma bellum)
- Buffalo darter (Etheostoma bison)
- Greenside darter (Etheostoma blennioides)
- Blenny darter (Etheostoma blennius)
- Carolina fantail darter (Etheostoma brevispinum)
- Brook darter (Etheostoma burri)
- Rainbow darter (Etheostoma caeruleum)
- Bluebreast darter (Etheostoma camurum)
- Greenfin darter (Etheostoma chlorobranchium)
- Bluntnose darter (Etheostoma chlorosomum)
- Lipstick darter (Etheostoma chuckwachatte)
- Creole darter (Etheostoma collettei)
- Carolina darter (Etheostoma collis)
- Coastal darter (Etheostoma colorosum)
- Coosa darter (Etheostoma coosae)
- Fringed darter (Etheostoma crossopterum)
- Choctawhatchee darter (Etheostoma davisoni)
- Stone darter (Etheostoma derivativum)
- Tuskaloosa darter (Etheostoma douglasi)
- Blackside snubnose darter (Etheostoma duryi)
- Brown darter (Etheostoma edwini)
- Meramec saddled darter (Etheostoma erythrozonum)
- Cherry darter (Etheostoma etnieri)
- Arkansas saddled darter (Etheostoma euzonum)
- Iowa darter (Etheostoma exile)
- Fantail darter (Etheostoma flabellare)
- Saffron darter (Etheostoma flavum)
- Strawberry darter (Etheostoma fragi)
- Savannah darter (Etheostoma fricksium)
- Swamp darter (Etheostoma fusiforme)
- Slough darter (Etheostoma gracile)
- Tuckasegee darter (Etheostoma gutselli)
- Harlequin darter (Etheostoma histrio)
- Christmas darter (Etheostoma hopkinsi)
- Turquoise darter (Etheostoma inscriptum)
- Blueside darter (Etheostoma jessiae)
- Greenbreast darter (Etheostoma jordani)
- Yoke darter (Etheostoma juliae)
- Kanawha darter (Etheostoma kanawhae)
- Highland Rim darter (Etheostoma kantuckeense)
- Stripetail darter (Etheostoma kennicotti)
- Tombigbee darter (Etheostoma lachneri)
- Headwater darter (Etheostoma lawrencei)
- Longfin darter (Etheostoma longimanum)
- Redband darter (Etheostoma luteovinctum)
- Brighteye darter (Etheostoma lynceum)
- Pinewoods darter (Etheostoma mariae)
- Least darter (Etheostoma microperca)
- Sunburst darter (Etheostoma mihileze)
- Blackfin darter (Etheostoma nigripinne)
- Johnny darter (Etheostoma nigrum)
- Barcheek darter (Etheostoma obeyense)
- Westrim darter (Etheostoma occidentale)
- Okaloosa darter (Etheostoma okaloosae)
- Sooty darter (Etheostoma olivaceum)
- Tessellated darter (Etheostoma olmstedi)
- Guardian darter (Etheostoma oophylax)
- Eastrim darter (Etheostoma orientale)
- Goldstripe darter (Etheostoma parvipinne)
- Duck darter (Etheostoma planasaxatile)
- Riverweed darter (Etheostoma podostemone)
- Cypress darter (Etheostoma proeliare)
- Stippled darter (Etheostoma punctulatum)
- Orangebelly darter (Etheostoma radiosum)
- Kentucky darter (Etheostoma rafinesquei)
- Alabama darter (Etheostoma ramseyi)
- Redline darter (Etheostoma rufilineatum)
- Rock darter (Etheostoma rupestre)
- Bloodfin darter (Etheostoma sanguifluum)
- Sawcheek darter (Etheostoma serrifer)
- Snubnose darter (Etheostoma simoterum)
- Slabrock darter (Etheostoma smithi)
- Orangethroat darter (Etheostoma spectabile)
- Spottail darter (Etheostoma squamiceps)
- Speckled darter (Etheostoma stigmaeum)
- Gulf darter (Etheostoma swaini)
- Swannanoa darter (Etheostoma swannanoa)
- Tallapoosa darter (Etheostoma tallapoosae)
- Tennessee darter (Etheostoma tennesseense)
- Missouri saddled darter (Etheostoma tetrazonum)
- Seagreen darter (Etheostoma thalassinum)
- Current darter (Etheostoma uniporum)
- Variegate darter (Etheostoma variatum)
- Striped darter (Etheostoma virgatum)
- Glassy darter (Etheostoma vitreum)
- Wounded darter (Etheostoma vulneratum)
- Redfin darter (Etheostoma whipplei)
- Etheostoma zonale
- Backwater darter (Etheostoma zonifer)
- Bandfin darter (Etheostoma zonistium)
- Donets ruffe (Gymnocephalus acerina)
- Balon's ruffe (Gymnocephalus baloni)
- Ruffe (Gymnocephalus cernua)
- Schraetzer (Gymnocephalus schraetser)
- Yellow perch (Perca flavescens)
- European perch (Perca fluviatilis)
- Azov percarina (Percarina maeotica)
- Guadalupe darter (Percina apristis)
- Tangerine darter (Percina aurantiaca)
- Southern logperch (Percina austroperca)
- Common logperch (Percina caprodes)
- Texas logperch (Percina carbonaria)
- Channel darter (Percina copelandi)
- Piedmont darter (Percina crassa)
- Gilt darter (Percina evides)
- Ozark logperch (Percina fulvitaenia)
- Appalachia darter (Percina gymnocephala)
- Mobile logperch (Percina kathae)
- Bigscale logperch (Percina macrolepida)
- Blackside darter (Percina maculata)
- Longnose darter (Percina nasuta)
- Chainback darter (Percina nevisense)
- Blackbanded darter (Percina nigrofasciata)
- Stripeback darter (Percina notogramma)
- Sharpnose darter (Percina oxyrhynchus)
- Bronze darter (Percina palmaris)
- Shield darter (Percina peltata)
- Slenderhead darter (Percina phoxocephala)
- Roanoke darter (Percina roanoka)
- Dusky darter (Percina sciera)
- River darter (Percina shumardi)
- Frecklebelly darter (Percina stictogaster)
- Gulf logperch (Percina suttkusi)
- Saddleback darter (Percina vigil)
- Sauger (Sander canadensis)
- Zander (Sander lucioperca)
- Walleye (Sander vitreus)
- Volga pikeperch (Sander volgensis)
- Streber (Zingel streber)
- Common zingel (Zingel zingel)

== Terapontids ==
- Greenway's grunter (Hannia greenwayi)
- Large-scale grunter (Leiopotherapon macrolepis)
- Silver grunter (Mesopristes argenteus)
- Tapiroid grunter (Mesopristes cancellatus)
- Sixlined trumpeter (Pelates sexlineatus)
- Gilbert's grunter (Pingalla gilberti)
- Midgley's grunter (Pingalla midgleyi)
- Tiger perch (Terapon jarbua)
- Largescaled terapon (Terapon theraps)

== Epinephelids ==
- Redmouth grouper (Aethaloperca rogaa)
- Mossfish (Alphestes afer)
- Pacific mutton hamlet (Alphestes immaculatus)
- Rivulated mutton hamlet (Alphestes multiguttatus)
- Slender grouper (Anyperodon leucogrammicus)
- Peacock grouper (Cephalopholis argus)
- Bluelined coralcod (Cephalopholis boenak)
- Graysby (Cephalopholis cruentata)
- Blue spotted hind (Cephalopholis cyanostigma)
- Bluelined hind (Cephalopholis formosa)
- Black guativere (Cephalopholis fulva)
- Garish hind (Cephalopholis igarashiensis)
- Leopard hind (Cephalopholis leopardus)
- Freckled hind (Cephalopholis microprion)
- Coral hind (Cephalopholis miniata)
- Niger hind (Cephalopholis nigri)
- Blackfin rockcod (Cephalopholis nigripinnis)
- Vermilion hind (Cephalopholis oligosticta)
- Pacific graysby (Cephalopholis panamensis)
- Harlequin hind (Cephalopholis polleni)
- Cephalopholis polyspila
- Six-blotch hind (Cephalopholis sexmaculata)
- Tomato hind (Cephalopholis sonnerati)
- Strawberry hind (Cephalopholis spiloparaea)
- African hind (Cephalopholis taeniops)
- Flag-tailed rockcod (Cephalopholis urodeta)
- Leather bass (Dermatolepis dermatolepis)
- Smooth grouper (Dermatolepis striolata)
- Epinephelus adscensionis
- Bighead grouper (Epinephelus amblycephalus)
- Rock bass spotted cabrilla (Epinephelus analogus)
- Areolate grouper (Epinephelus areolatus)
- Twinspot grouper (Epinephelus bilobatus)
- Brown spotted reef cod (Epinephelus chlorostigma)
- Epinephelus clippertonensis
- Whitespotted grouper (Epinephelus coeruleopunctatus)
- Speckled blue grouper (Epinephelus cyanopodus)
- Blacktip grouper (Epinephelus fasciatus)
- Blue and yellow grouper (Epinephelus flavocaeruleus)
- Red hind (Epinephelus guttatus)
- Hexagon grouper (Epinephelus hexagonatus)
- Blacksaddle grouper (Epinephelus howlandi)
- Marquesan grouper (Epinephelus irroratus)
- Starry grouper (Epinephelus labriformis)
- Longspine grouper (Epinephelus longispinis)
- Snubnose grouper (Epinephelus macrospilos)
- Highfin grouper (Epinephelus maculatus)
- Honeycomb grouper (Epinephelus merra)
- Netfin grouper (Epinephelus miliaris)
- Comet grouper (Epinephelus morrhua)
- White-blotched grouper (Epinephelus multinotatus)
- White-streaked grouper (Epinephelus ongus)
- Dot-dash grouper (Epinephelus poecilonotus)
- Longfin grouper (Epinephelus quoyanus)
- Oblique-banded grouper (Epinephelus radiatus)
- Halfmoon grouper (Epinephelus rivulatus)
- Foursaddle grouper (Epinephelus spilotoceps)
- Black-dotted grouper (Epinephelus stictus)
- Threespot grouper (Epinephelus trimaculatus)
- Reticulate grouper (Epinephelus tuamotuensis)
- Potato cod (Epinephelus tukula)
- Spanish flag (Gonioplectrus hispanus)
- Rooster hind (Hyporthodus acanthistius)
- Sevenbar grouper (Hyporthodus ergastularius)
- Misty grouper (Hyporthodus mystacinus)
- Sevenband grouper (Hyporthodus septemfasciatus)
- Western comb grouper (Mycteroperca acutirostris)
- Gag (Mycteroperca microlepis)
- Scamp grouper (Mycteroperca phenax)
- Mottled grouper (Mycteroperca rubra)
- Tiger grouper (Mycteroperca tigris)
- Broomtail grouper (Mycteroperca xenarcha)
- Pacific creole-fish (Paranthias colonus)
- Creole-fish (Paranthias furcifer)
- Bar-cheeked trout (Plectropomus maculatus)
- Oval grouper (Triso dermopterus)
- White-edged lyre tail (Variola albimarginata)
- Yellow-edged lyretail (Variola louti)

== Eleotrids ==
- Bostrychus africanus
- Four-eyed sleeper (Bostrychus sinensis)
- Green-backed gudgeon (Bunaka gyrinoides)
- Ambon gudgeon (Butis amboinensis)
- Crazy fish (Butis butis)
- Tailface sleeper (Calumia godeffroyi)
- Pacific fat sleeper (Dormitator latifrons)
- Sleeper goby (Dormitator lebretonis)
- Fat sleeper (Dormitator maculatus)
- Spine-cheek gudgeon (Eleotris acanthopoma)
- Large-scaled spinycheek sleeper (Eleotris amblyopsis)
- Eleotris daganensis
- Brown spinecheek gudgeon (Eleotris fusca)
- Broadhead sleeper (Eleotris melanosoma)
- Eleotris oxycephala
- Eleotris perniger
- Spotted sleeper (Eleotris picta)
- Spinycheek sleeper (Eleotris pisonis)
- Eleotris senegalensis
- Eleotris vittata
- Emerald sleeper (Erotelis smaragdus)
- Snakehead gudgeon (Giuris margaritacea)
- Tarndale bully (Gobiomorphus alpinus)
- Cran's bully (Gobiomorphus basalis)
- Upland bully (Gobiomorphus breviceps)
- Common bully (Gobiomorphus cotidianus)
- Giant bully (Gobiomorphus gobioides)
- Bigmouth sleeper (Gobiomorus dormitor)
- Gobiomorus maculatus
- Guavina (Guavina guavina)
- Golden gudgeon (Hypseleotris aurea)
- Hypseleotris compressocephalus
- Kribia kribensis
- Kribia nana
- Kribia uellensis
- Freshwater sleeper goby (Leptophilypnus fluviatilis)
- Kokoda mogurnda (Mogurnda lineata)
- Eastern mogurnda (Mogurnda orientalis)
- Spangled gudgeon (Ophiocara porocephala)
- Oxyeleotris marmorata

== Gobies ==
- Yellowfin goby (Acanthogobius flavimanus)
- Akihito vanuatu
- Triplespot shrimpgoby (Amblyeleotris triguttata)
- Buan goby (Amblygobius buanensis)
- Amblygobius tekomaji
- Sabre goby (Antilligobius nikkiae)
- Apocryptodon punctatus
- Slow goby (Aruma histrio)
- Roman nose goby (Awaous acritosus)
- Candy cane goby (Awaous flavus)
- Awaous grammepomus
- Oopu nakea (Awaous guamensis)
- Oman sea longsnout goby (Awaous jayakari)
- Awaous macrorhynchus
- Awaous ocellaris
- Racer goby (Babka gymnotrachelus)
- Whiskered goby (Barbulifer antennatus)
- Barbulifer ceuthoecus
- Barbuligobius boehlkei
- Bathygobius aeolosoma
- Bathygobius andrei
- Antilles frillfin (Bathygobius antilliensis)
- Bathygobius casamancus
- Notchtongue goby (Bathygobius curacao)
- Brown frillfin (Bathygobius fuscus)
- Checkerboard frillfin goby (Bathygobius lacertus)
- Island frillfin (Bathygobius mystacium)
- Panamic frillfin (Bathygobius ramosus)
- Frillfin goby (Bathygobius soporator)
- Don tadpole-goby (Benthophilus durrelli)
- Granular pugolovka (Benthophilus granulosus)
- Caspian stellate tadpole-goby (Benthophilus leobergius)
- Caspian tadpole goby (Benthophilus macrocephalus)
- Azov tadpole goby (Benthophilus magistri)
- Small-spine tadpole-goby (Benthophilus mahmudbejovi)
- Black Sea tadpole-goby (Benthophilus nudus)
- Stellate tadpole-goby (Benthophilus stellatus)
- Boddart's goggle-eyed goby (Boleophthalmus boddarti)
- White-eye goby (Bollmannia boqueronensis)
- Bollmannia chlamydes
- Ragged goby (Bollmannia communis)
- Shelf goby (Bollmannia eigenmanni)
- Citrine goby (Bollmannia litura)
- Bumblebee goby (Brachygobius doriae)
- Kabili bumblebee goby (Brachygobius kabiliensis)
- Mekong dwarf goby (Brachygobius mekongensis)
- Brachygobius xanthomelas
- Gorgonian goby (Bryaninops amplus)
- De Buen's goby (Buenia affinis)
- Jeffrey's goby (Buenia jeffreysii)
- Saddled goby (Callogobius clitellus)
- Scaleless worm goby (Caragobius urolepis)
- Caspiosoma caspium
- Chaenogobius annularis
- Thread-spined goby (Chriolepis bilix)
- Translucent goby (Chriolepis fisheri)
- Wasp goby (Chriolepis vespa)
- Gecko goby (Chriolepis zebra)
- Brito's goby (Chromogobius britoi)
- Chestnut goby (Chromogobius quadrivittatus)
- Kolombatovic's goby (Chromogobius zebratus)
- Liechtenstein's goby (Corcyrogobius liechtensteini)
- Colon goby (Coryphopterus dicrus)
- Coryphopterus glaucofraenum
- Coryphopterus punctipectophorus
- Redlight goby (Coryphopterus urospilus)
- Burrowing goby (Croilia mossambica)
- Crystal goby (Crystallogobius linearis)
- Darter goby (Ctenogobius boleosoma)
- Blotchcheek goby (Ctenogobius fasciatus)
- Ctenogobius lepturus
- Mangrove goby (Ctenogobius manglicola)
- Impostor goby (Ctenogobius phenacus)
- Slashcheek goby (Ctenogobius pseudofasciatus)
- Dash goby (Ctenogobius saepepallens)
- Ctenogobius sagittula
- American freshwater goby (Ctenogobius shufeldti)
- Emerald goby (Ctenogobius smaragdus)
- Marked goby (Ctenogobius stigmaticus)
- Spottail goby (Ctenogobius stigmaturus)
- Sperm goby (Ctenogobius thoropsis)
- Toothed goby (Deltentosteus collonianus)
- Didogobius kochi
- Didogobius schlieweni
- Splechtna's goby (Didogobius splechtnai)
- Didogobius wirtzi
- Bighead goby (Drombus globiceps)
- Hale's drombus (Drombus halei)
- Economidichthys pygmaeus
- Shortstripe goby (Elacatinus chancei)
- Belize sponge goby (Elacatinus colini)
- Banded cleaner goby (Elacatinus digueti)
- Sharknose goby (Elacatinus evelynae)
- Cleaner goby (Elacatinus genie)
- Yellowline goby (Elacatinus horsti)
- Barsnout goby (Elacatinus illecebrosus)
- Inornate goby (Elacatinus inornatus)
- Spotback goby (Elacatinus janssi)
- Linesnout goby (Elacatinus lori)
- Spotlight goby (Elacatinus louisae)
- Northern neon goby (Elacatinus oceanops)
- Redhead goby (Elacatinus puncticulatus)
- Yellownose goby (Elacatinus randalli)
- Serranilla goby (Elacatinus serranilla)
- Slaty goby (Elacatinus tenox)
- Yellowprow goby (Elacatinus xanthiprora)
- Silt goby (Enypnias seminudus)
- Eugnathogobius illotus
- Eugnathogobius kabilia
- Eugnathogobius mindora
- Eugnathogobius siamensis
- Eugnathogobius variegatus
- Bandedtail goby (Evermannia zosterura)
- Roughtail goby (Evermannichthys metzelaari)
- Evermannichthys spongicola
- Belly-spotted pygmy-goby (Eviota storthynx)
- Lyre goby (Evorthodus lyricus)
- Small goby (Evorthodus minutus)
- Puntang goby (Exyrias puntang)
- Exquisite sand-goby (Favonigobius exquisitus)
- Steinitz's goby (Gammogobius steinitzi)
- Longjaw mudsucker (Gillichthys mirabilis)
- Nineline goby (Ginsburgellus novemlineatus)
- Golden flathead goby (Glossogobius aureus)
- Bearded flathead goby (Glossogobius bicirrhosus)
- River goby (Glossogobius callidus)
- Tank goby (Glossogobius giuris)
- Glossogobius olivaceus
- Eyebar goby (Gnatholepis cauerensis)
- Goldspot goby (Gnatholepis thompsoni)
- Actor coral goby (Gobiodon histrio)
- Gobioides africanus
- Violet goby (Gobioides broussonnetii)
- Peruvian eelgoby (Gobioides peruanus)
- Gobioides sagitta
- Estuary goby (Gobionellus microdon)
- Gobionellus occidentalis
- Highfin goby (Gobionellus oceanicus)
- Gobiopterus mindanensis
- Naked goby (Gobiosoma bosc)
- Sonora goby (Gobiosoma chiquita)
- Seaboard goby (Gobiosoma ginsburgi)
- Rockcut goby (Gobiosoma grosvenori)
- Twoscale goby (Gobiosoma longipala)
- Paradox goby (Gobiosoma paradoxum)
- Code goby (Gobiosoma robustum)
- Vermiculated goby (Gobiosoma spes)
- Yucatan goby (Gobiosoma yucatanum)
- Gobitrichinotus arnoulti
- Gobitrichinotus radiocularis
- Bellotti's goby (Gobius ater)
- Gobius ateriformis
- Golden goby (Gobius auratus)
- Bucchich's goby (Gobius bucchichi)
- Couch's goby (Gobius couchi)
- Red-mouthed goby (Gobius cruentatus)
- Sarato's goby (Gobius fallax)
- Steven's goby (Gobius gasteveni)
- Slender goby (Gobius geniporus)
- Gobius hypselosoma
- Gobius kolombatovici
- Black goby (Gobius niger)
- Rock goby (Gobius paganellus)
- Roule's goby (Gobius roulei)
- Gobius rubropunctatus
- Gobius senegambiensis
- Striped goby (Gobius vittatus)
- Yellow-headed goby (Gobius xanthocephalus)
- Two-spotted goby (Gobiusculus flavescens)
- Crescent goby (Gobulus crescentalis)
- Sandtop goby (Gobulus hancocki)
- Paleback goby (Gobulus myersi)
- Gorogobius nigricinctus
- Splitbanded goby (Gymneleotris seminudus)
- Hetereleotris vulgaris
- Cheekspot goby (Ilypnus gilberti)
- Brown-speckled sand-goby (Istigobius rigilius)
- Knipowitschia bergi
- Köycegiz naked goby (Knipowitschia byblisia)
- Caucasian dwarf goby (Knipowitschia caucasica)
- Köycegiz dwarf goby (Knipowitschia caunosi)
- Longtail dwarf goby (Knipowitschia longecaudata)
- Adriatic dwarf goby (Knipowitschia panizzae)
- Guillet's goby (Lebetus guilleti)
- Diminutive goby (Lebetus scorpioides)
- Lentipes kaaea
- Fries's goby (Lesueurigobius friesii)
- Lesueurigobius koumansi
- Sanzo's goby (Lesueurigobius sanzi)
- Lophiogobius ocellicauda
- Pacific crested-goby (Lophogobius cristulatus)
- Crested goby (Lophogobius cyprinoides)
- Mahogany goby (Lythrypnus crocodilus)
- Bluebanded goby (Lythrypnus dalli)
- Dwarf goby (Lythrypnus elasson)
- Diphasic goby (Lythrypnus heterochroma)
- Pygmy goby (Lythrypnus minimus)
- Bermuda goby (Lythrypnus mowbrayi)
- Island goby (Lythrypnus nesiotes)
- Okapi goby (Lythrypnus okapia)
- Convict goby (Lythrypnus phorellus)
- Gorgeous goby (Lythrypnus pulchellus)
- Bluegold goby (Lythrypnus spilus)
- Lythrypnus zebra
- Mauligobius nigri
- Toad goby (Mesogobius batrachocephalus)
- Balboa goby (Microgobius brevispinis)
- Seminole goby (Microgobius carri)
- Yellow-spotted goby (Microgobius crocatus)
- Low-crested goby (Microgobius curtus)
- Roundscale goby (Microgobius cyclolepis)
- Emblem goby (Microgobius emblematicus)
- Erect goby (Microgobius erectus)
- Microgobius gulosus
- Meek's goby (Microgobius meeki)
- Banner goby (Microgobius microlepis)
- Miraflores goby (Microgobius miraflorensis)
- Dashback goby (Microgobius signatus)
- Taboga goby (Microgobius tabogensis)
- Green goby (Microgobius thalassinus)
- Large-headed goby (Millerigobius macrocephalus)
- Mugilogobius abei
- Bandfin mangrove goby (Mugilogobius cavifrons)
- Yellowstripe goby (Mugilogobius chulae)
- Merton's mangrove goby (Mugilogobius mertoni)
- Pacific mangrove goby (Mugilogobius notospilus)
- Indonesian goby (Mugilogobius platystomus)
- Queen of Siam goby (Mugilogobius rambaiae)
- Nematogobius brachynemus
- Monkey goby (Neogobius fluviatilis)
- Round goby (Neogobius melanostomus)
- Neogobius pallasi
- Atlantic shrimp goby (Nes longus)
- Orange-spotted sand-goby (Nesogobius hinsbyi)
- Obliquogobius turkayi
- Coralline goby (Odondebuenia balearica)
- Kei goby (Oligolepis keiensis)
- Oxyurichthys stigmalophius
- Padogobius bonelli
- Mauve goby (Palatogobius paradoxus)
- Mekong rock goby (Papuligobius ocellatus)
- Parasicydium bandama
- Peppered goby (Pariah scotius)
- Lucretia's goby (Parrella lucretiae)
- Parrella macropteryx
- Doublestripe goby (Parrella maxillaris)
- Atlantic mudskipper (Periophthalmus barbarus)
- Bath's goby (Pomatoschistus bathi)
- Canestrini's goby (Pomatoschistus canestrinii)
- Kner's goby (Pomatoschistus knerii)
- Lozano's goby (Pomatoschistus lozanoi)
- Marbled goby (Pomatoschistus marmoratus)
- Common goby (Pomatoschistus microps)
- Sand goby (Pomatoschistus minutus)
- Skadar goby (Pomatoschistus montenegrensis)
- Norway goby (Pomatoschistus norvegicus)
- Painted goby (Pomatoschistus pictus)
- Quagga goby (Pomatoschistus quagga)
- Pinchuk's goby (Ponticola cephalargoides)
- Caucasian goby (Ponticola constructor)
- Caspian freshwater goby (Ponticola cyrius)
- Mushroom goby (Ponticola eurycephalus)
- Caspian bighead goby (Ponticola gorlap)
- Ponticola kessleri
- Flatsnout goby (Ponticola platyrostris)
- Syrman goby (Ponticola syrman)
- Dawson's goby (Priolepis dawsoni)
- Rusty goby (Priolepis hipoliti)
- Priolepis robinsi
- Tubenose goby (Proterorhinus marmoratus)
- Eastern tubenose goby (Proterorhinus nasalis)
- Western tubenose goby (Proterorhinus semilunaris)
- Sleepy goby (Psammogobius biocellatus)
- Ferrer's goby (Pseudaphya ferreri)
- Pseudapocryptes elongatus
- Pseudogobiopsis oligactis
- Northern fatnose goby (Pseudogobius poicilosoma)
- Scaleless goby (Psilotris alepis)
- Toadfish goby (Psilotris batrachodes)
- Highspine goby (Psilotris celsus)
- Kaufman's goby (Psilotris kaufmani)
- Pterogobius zonoleucus
- Roosevelt's goby (Pycnomma roosevelti)
- American shadow goby (Quietula y-cauda)
- Girdled goby (Redigobius balteatus)
- Speckled goby (Redigobius bikolanus)
- Redigobius chrysosoma
- Checked goby (Redigobius dewaali)
- Tambujon goby (Redigobius tambujon)
- Barcheek goby (Rhinogobius giurinus)
- Rhinogobius leavelli
- Rhinogobius mekongianus
- Rhinogobius taenigena
- Tusked goby (Risor ruber)
- Schismatogobius vitiensis
- Sicydium crenilabrum
- Multispotted goby (Sicydium multipunctatum)
- Spotted algae-eating goby (Sicydium punctatum)
- Sicyopterus franouxi
- Sicyopterus griseus
- Sicyopterus lagocephalus
- Sicyopterus lividus
- Sicyopterus pugnans
- Sicyopus nigriradiatus
- Sicyopus zosterophorus
- Silhouettea aegyptia
- Smilosicyopus chloe
- Smilosicyopus fehlmanni
- Grotto goby (Speleogobius trigloides)
- Stenogobius beauforti
- Stenogobius fehlmanni
- Stenogobius genivittatus
- Stenogobius gymnopomus
- Stenogobius hoesei
- Kenyan river goby (Stenogobius kenyae)
- Stenogobius laterisquamatus
- Stenogobius mekongensis
- Stenogobius ophthalmoporus
- Chinestripe goby (Stenogobius polyzona)
- Stenogobius yateiensis
- Stigmatogobius sella
- Stiphodon atratus
- Stiphodon birdsong
- Stiphodon caeruleus
- Stiphodon elegans
- Stiphodon rutilaureus
- Stiphodon sapphirinus
- Stiphodon tuivi
- Thorogobius angolensis
- Leopard-spotted goby (Thorogobius ephippiatus)
- Large-scaled goby (Thorogobius macrolepis)
- Thorogobius rofeni
- Orangesided goby (Tigrigobius dilepis)
- Frecklefin goby (Tigrigobius gemmatus)
- Tigrigobius macrodon
- Greenbanded goby (Tigrigobius multifasciatus)
- Semiscaled goby (Tigrigobius pallens)
- Leopard goby (Tigrigobius saucrus)
- Zebrette goby (Tigrigobius zebrellus)
- Shimofuri goby (Tridentiger bifasciatus)
- Tridentiger kuroiwae
- Trimma fraena
- Vanneaugobius canariensis
- Ratan goby (Vanneaugobius pruvoti)
- Wheelerigobius maltzani
- Cameroon goby (Wheelerigobius wirtzi)
- Yongeichthys thomasi
- Zebra goby (Zebrus zebrus)
- Grass goby (Zosterisessor ophiocephalus)

== Badids ==
- Badis badis
- Badis blosyrus
- Badis ferrarisi
- Badis khwae
- Badis ruber
- Dario hysginon

== Sparids ==
Species

- Arabian yellowfin seabream (Acanthopagrus arabicus)
- Surf bream (Acanthopagrus australis)
- Picnic seabream (Acanthopagrus berda)
- Two-bar seabream (Acanthopagrus bifasciatus)
- Southern black bream (Acanthopagrus butcheri)
- Western yellow-finned bream (Acanthopagrus morrisoni)
- Pacific seabream (Acanthopagrus pacificus)
- Northwest black bream (Acanthopagrus palmaris)
- Japanese black porgy (Acanthopagrus schlegelii)
- Spotted yellowfin seabream (Acanthopagrus sheim)
- Sheepshead (Archosargus probatocephalus)
- Western Atlantic seabream (Archosargus rhomboidalis)
- Taiwan tai (Argyrops bleekeri)
- Soldierbream (Argyrops filamentosus)
- Long spined red bream (Argyrops spinifer)
- Bogue (Boops boops)
- Fransmadam (Boopsoidea inornata)
- Grass porgy (Calamus arctifrons)
- Jolthead porgy (Calamus bajonado)
- Pacific porgy (Calamus brachysomus)
- Saucereye porgy (Calamus calamus)
- Spotfin porgy (Calamus cervigoni)
- Whitebone porgy (Calamus leucosteus)
- Flathead porgy (Calamus mu)
- Knobbed porgy (Calamus nodosus)
- Sheepshead porgy (Calamus penna)
- Pluma porgy (Calamus pennatula)
- Littlehead porgy (Calamus proridens)
- False red stumpnose (Chrysoblephus lophus)
- Slinger seabream (Chrysoblephus puniceus)
- Karenteen seabream (Crenidens crenidens)
- Crenidens indicus
- Dentex abei
- Barnard's dentex (Dentex barnardi)
- Canary dentex (Dentex canariensis)
- Congo dentex (Dentex congoensis)
- Pink dentex (Dentex gibbosus)
- Dentex hypselosomus
- Large-eyed dentex (Dentex macrophthalmus)
- Morocco dentex (Dentex maroccanus)
- Saffronfin sea bream (Dentex spariformis)
- Annular seabream (Diplodus annularis)
- South-american silver porgy (Diplodus argenteus)
- Senegal seabream (Diplodus bellottii)
- Bermuda porgy (Diplodus bermudensis)
- Blacktail (Diplodus capensis)
- Zebra seabream (Diplodus cervinus)
- Banded seabream (Diplodus fasciatus)
- Spottail pinfish (Diplodus holbrookii)
- Zebra (Diplodus hottentotus)
- Red sea seabream (Diplodus noct)
- Diplodus omanensis
- Diplodus prayensis
- Sharpsnout seabream (Diplodus puntazzo)
- Sargo (Diplodus sargus)
- Common two-banded seabream (Diplodus vulgaris)
- Yellowback seabream (Evynnis tumifrons)
- Janbruin (Gymnocrotaphus curvidens)
- Salt-water bream (Lagodon rhomboides)
- Sand steenbras (Lithognathus mormyrus)
- Saddled seabream (Oblada melanura)
- Blue hottentot (Pachymetopon aeneum)
- Hottentot seabream (Pachymetopon blochii)
- Axillary seabream (Pagellus acarne)
- Arabian pandora (Pagellus affinis)
- Red pandora (Pagellus bellottii)
- Common pandora (Pagellus erythrinus)
- Natal pandora (Pagellus natalensis)
- African red bream (Pagrus africanus)
- Australasian snapper (Pagrus auratus)
- Red-banded sea bream (Pagrus auriga)
- Goldenhead porgy (Pagrus caeruleostictus)
- Red seabream snapper (Pagrus major)
- Red porgy (Pagrus pagrus)
- German seabream (Polyamblyodon germanum)
- Knife-back seabream (Polyamblyodon gibbosum)
- Frenchman seabream (Polysteganus baissaci)
- Dane seabream (Porcostoma dentata)
- Panga (Pterogymnus laniarius)
- Haffara seabream (Rhabdosargus haffara)
- Cape stumpnose (Rhabdosargus holubi)
- Goldlined seabream (Rhabdosargus sarba)
- Bigeye stumpnose (Rhabdosargus thorpei)
- Salema porgy (Sarpa salpa)
- Sobaity seabream (Sparidentex hasta)
- Gilt-head bream (Sparus aurata)
- Black seabream (Spondyliosoma cantharus)
- Steentjie (Spondyliosoma emarginatum)
- Longspine porgy (Stenotomus caprinus)
- Bulldog dentex (Virididentex acromegalus)

Subspecies

- White bream (Diplodus argenteus argenteus)
- Roundspot porgy (Diplodus argenteus caudimacula)
- Diplodus sargus ascensionis
- Moroccan white seabream (Diplodus sargus cadenati)
- St. Helena white seabream (Diplodus sargus helenae)
- One spot seabream (Diplodus sargus kotschyi)
- Diplodus sargus lineatus
- Diplodus sargus sargus

== Scombrids ==
- Wahoo (Acanthocybium solandri)
- Slender tuna (Allothunnus fallai)
- Bullet tuna (Auxis rochei)
- Leadenall (Auxis thazard)
- Leaping bonito (Cybiosarda elegans)
- Kawakawa (Euthynnus affinis)
- Little tunny (Euthynnus alletteratus)
- Euthynnus lineatus
- Butterfly kingfish (Gasterochisma melampus)
- Shark mackerel (Grammatorcynus bicarinatus)
- Double-lined mackerel (Grammatorcynus bilineatus)
- Dogtooth tuna (Gymnosarda unicolor)
- Skipjack tuna (Katsuwonus pelamis)
- Plain bonito (Orcynopsis unicolor)
- Australian bonito (Sarda australis)
- Sarda chiliensis
- Striped bonito (Sarda orientalis)
- Atlantic bonito (Sarda sarda)
- Blue mackerel (Scomber australasicus)
- Atlantic chub mackerel (Scomber colias)
- Chub mackerel (Scomber japonicus)
- Atlantic mackerel (Scomber scombrus)
- Serra Spanish mackerel (Scomberomorus brasiliensis)
- King mackerel (Scomberomorus cavalla)
- Korean mackerel (Scomberomorus koreanus)
- Streaked Spanish mackerel (Scomberomorus lineolatus)
- Atlantic Spanish mackerel (Scomberomorus maculatus)
- Papuan seerfish (Scomberomorus multiradiatus)
- Queensland school mackerel (Scomberomorus queenslandicus)
- Cero (Scomberomorus regalis)
- Broadbarred king mackerel (Scomberomorus semifasciatus)
- Pacific sierra (Scomberomorus sierra)
- West African Spanish mackerel (Scomberomorus tritor)
- Blackfin tuna (Thunnus atlanticus)

== Dragonets ==
- Lancer dragonet (Callionymus bairdi)
- Banded dragonet (Callionymus fasciatus)
- Common dragonet (Callionymus lyra)
- Spotted dragonet (Callionymus maculatus)
- Sailfin dragonet (Callionymus pusillus)
- Reticulated dragonet (Callionymus reticulatus)
- Risso's dragonet (Callionymus risso)
- Arrow dragonet (Callionymus sagitta)
- Diplogrammus pauciradiatus
- Shango dragonet (Draculo shango)
- Spotfin dragonet (Foetorepus agassizii)
- Palefin dragonet (Foetorepus goodenbeani)
- Antler dragonet (Synchiropus atrilabiatus)
- Claudia's dragonet (Synchiropus claudiae)
- Dagmar's dragonet (Synchiropus dagmarae)
- Western Australian bigeye dragonet (Synchiropus grandoculis)
- Phaeton dragonet (Synchiropus phaeton)
- Tonlesapia amnica

== Lutjanids ==
- Apsilus dentatus
- African forktail snapper (Apsilus fuscus)
- Mexican barred snapper (Hoplopagrus guentherii)
- Schoolmaster snapper (Lutjanus apodus)
- Lutjanus aratus
- Amarillo snapper (Lutjanus argentiventris)
- Lutjanus colorado
- Checkered seaperch (Lutjanus decussatus)
- Golden African snapper (Lutjanus fulgens)
- Mangrove snapper (Lutjanus griseus)
- Rose snapper (Lutjanus guttatus)
- Lutjanus inermis
- Rufous snapper (Lutjanus jordani)
- Mahogany snapper (Lutjanus mahogoni)
- Bluestriped snapper (Lutjanus notatus)
- Pacific Cubera snapper (Lutjanus novemfasciatus)
- Pacific red snapper (Lutjanus peru)
- Blue and gold snapper (Lutjanus viridis)
- Silk snapper (Lutjanus vivanus)
- Pristipomoides aquilonaris
- Slender wenchman (Pristipomoides freemani)
- Cardinal snapper (Pristipomoides macrophthalmus)

== Sand stargazers ==
- Giant sand stargazer (Dactylagnus mundus)
- Panamic stargazer (Dactylagnus parvus)
- Riverine stargazer (Dactyloscopus amnis)
- Dactyloscopus boehlkei
- Notchtail stargazer (Dactyloscopus byersi)
- Ornamented stargazer (Dactyloscopus comptus)
- Bigeye stargazer (Dactyloscopus crossotus)
- Dactyloscopus elongatus
- Dactyloscopus fallax
- Fringed stargazer (Dactyloscopus fimbriatus)
- Reticulate stargazer (Dactyloscopus foraminosus)
- Dactyloscopus heraldi
- Moonstruck stargazer (Dactyloscopus lunaticus)
- Mexican stargazer (Dactyloscopus metoecus)
- Tiny stargazer (Dactyloscopus minutus)
- Speckled stargazer (Dactyloscopus moorei)
- Whitesaddle stargazer (Dactyloscopus pectoralis)
- Dactyloscopus poeyi
- Dactyloscopus tridigitatus
- Sandy stargazer (Gillellus arenicola)
- Gillellus greyae
- Masked stargazer (Gillellus healae)
- Jackson's stargazer (Gillellus jacksoni)
- Ornate stargazer (Gillellus ornatus)
- Searcher stargazer (Gillellus searcheri)
- Half-banded stargazer (Gillellus semicinctus)
- Warteye stargazer (Gillellus uranidea)
- Banded stargazer (Heteristius cinctus)
- Smoothlip stargazer (Leurochilus acon)
- Myxodagnus macrognathus
- Dart stargazer (Myxodagnus opercularis)
- Myxodagnus walkeri
- Brazilian sand stargazer (Platygillellus brasiliensis)
- Saddle stargazer (Platygillellus rubrocinctus)
- Sindoscopus australis
- Storrsia olsoni

== Tilefishes ==
- Red tilefish (Branchiostegus japonicus)
- Zebra tilefish (Branchiostegus semifasciatus)
- Bighead tilefish (Caulolatilus affinis)
- Goldface tilefish (Caulolatilus chrysops)
- Blackline tilefish (Caulolatilus cyanops)
- Reticulated tilefish (Caulolatilus guppyi)
- Hubbs' tilefish (Caulolatilus hubbsi)
- Gulf bareye tilefish (Caulolatilus intermedius)
- Ocean whitefish (Caulolatilus princeps)
- Yellow-spotted tilefish (Hoplolatilus fourmanoiri)
- Sand tilefish (Malacanthus plumieri)

== Anabantidae ==
- Climbing perch (Anabas testudineus)
- Leopard bush fish (Ctenopoma acutirostre)
- Tailspot ctenopoma (Ctenopoma kingsleyae)
- Ctenopoma machadoi
- Ctenopoma maculatum
- Many spined climbing perch (Ctenopoma multispine)
- Ocellated labyrinth fish (Ctenopoma muriei)
- Twospot climbing perch (Ctenopoma nigropannosum)
- Eyespot ctenopoma (Ctenopoma ocellatum)
- Ctenopoma petherici
- Mottled ctenopoma (Ctenopoma weeksii)
- Orange ctenopoma (Microctenopoma ansorgii)
- Congo ctenopoma (Microctenopoma congicum)
- Microctenopoma damasi
- Banded ctenopoma (Microctenopoma fasciolatum)
- Microctenopoma intermedium
- Dwarf ctenopoma (Microctenopoma nanum)
- Microctenopoma nigricans
- Microctenopoma ocellifer
- Microctenopoma uelense

== Pomacentrids ==
- Dusky sergeant (Abudefduf concolor)
- Mexican night sergeant (Abudefduf declivifrons)
- Canary damsel (Abudefduf luridus)
- Sergeant major (Abudefduf saxatilis)
- Dovetail (Abudefduf taurus)
- Panama sergeant major (Abudefduf troschelii)
- Orange skunk clownfish (Amphiprion sandaracinos)
- Yellow-speckled chromis (Chromis alpha)
- Oval chromis (Chromis alta)
- Scissortail damselfish (Chromis atrilobata)
- Chromis bermudae
- Cadenat's chromis (Chromis cadenati)
- Mediterranean chromis (Chromis chromis)
- Valparaiso chromis (Chromis crusma)
- Blue chromis (Chromis cyanea)
- Yellowtail reeffish (Chromis enchrysura)
- Sunshinefish (Chromis insolata)
- Peruvian chromis (Chromis intercrusma)
- Azores chromis (Chromis limbata)
- Blue-and-yellow chromis (Chromis limbaughi)
- Lubbock's chromis (Chromis lubbocki)
- Brown chromis (Chromis multilineata)
- Pemba chromis (Chromis pembae)
- Blacksmith chromis (Chromis punctipinnis)
- St. Helena chromis (Chromis sanctaehelenae)
- Purple reeffish (Chromis scotti)
- Yellowfin damselfish (Chrysiptera flavipinnis)
- Cape damsel (Chrysiptera unimaculata)
- Garibaldi (Hypsypops rubicundus)
- Bumphead damselfish (Microspathodon bairdii)
- Yellowtail damselfish (Microspathodon chrysurus)
- Giant damselfish (Microspathodon dorsalis)
- Guinea damselfish (Microspathodon frontatus)
- Chinese damsel (Neopomacentrus bankieri)
- Coquito sergeant (Nexilosus latifrons)
- Victorian scalyfin (Parma victoriae)
- Blue-green damselfish (Pomacentrus callainus)
- Miller's damselfish (Pomacentrus milleri)
- Smith's damsel (Pomacentrus smithi)
- Ward's damsel (Pomacentrus wardi)
- Acapulco damselfish (Stegastes acapulcoensis)
- Dusky damselfish (Stegastes adustus)
- Island major (Stegastes arcifrons)
- Longfin damselfish (Stegastes diencaeus)
- Beaubrummel (Stegastes flavilatus)
- Demoiselle (Stegastes fuscus)
- Coral Sea gregory (Stegastes gascoynei)
- Cape Verde gregory (Stegastes imbricatus)
- Beaugregory (Stegastes leucostictus)
- Stegastes lubbocki
- Bicolor damselfish (Stegastes partitus)
- Threespot damselfish (Stegastes planifrons)
- Cortez damselfish (Stegastes rectifraenum)
- Stegastes sanctaehelenae
- Saint Paul's gregory (Stegastes sanctipauli)
- Cocoa damselfish (Stegastes xanthurus)
- Jordan's damsel (Teixeirichthys jordani)

== Sciaenids ==
- Freshwater drum (Aplodinotus grunniens)
- Meagre (Argyrosomus regius)
- White seabass (Atractoscion nobilis)
- Armed croaker (Bairdiella armata)
- American silver perch (Bairdiella chrysoura)
- Swordpsine croaker (Bairdiella ensifera)
- Bairdiella (Bairdiella icistia)
- Ground croaker (Bairdiella ronchus)
- Blue croaker (Corvula batabana)
- Striped croaker (Corvula sanctaeluciae)
- Barbel drum (Ctenosciaena gracilicirrhus)
- Acoupa weakfish (Cynoscion acoupa)
- Peruvian weakfish (Cynoscion analis)
- Sand seatrout (Cynoscion arenarius)
- Jamaican weakfish (Cynoscion jamaicensis)
- Smooth weakfish (Cynoscion leiarchus)
- Smallscale weakfish (Cynoscion microlepidotus)
- Dwarf weakfish (Cynoscion nannus)
- Spotted weakfish (Cynoscion nebulosus)
- Silver seatrout (Cynoscion nothus)
- Cachema weakfish (Cynoscion phoxocephalus)
- Striped corvina (Cynoscion reticulatus)
- Tonkin weakfish (Cynoscion similis)
- Scalyfin corvina (Cynoscion squamipinnis)
- Smalltooth weakfish (Cynoscion steindachneri)
- Pelano weakfish (Cynoscion stolzmanni)
- Green weakfish (Cynoscion virescens)
- Bluestreak drum (Elattarchus archidium)
- Jack-knifefish (Equetus lanceolatus)
- Spotted drum (Equetus punctatus)
- Bigtooth corvina (Isopisthus parvipinnis)
- Bigeye corvina (Isopisthus remifer)
- Big-eyed jewfish (Johnius coitor)
- Paperhead croaker (Johnius novaeguineae)
- Steeplined drum (Larimus acclivis)
- Silver drum (Larimus argenteus)
- Shorthead drum (Larimus breviceps)
- Shining drum (Larimus effulgens)
- Larimus fasciatus
- Pacific drum (Larimus pacificus)
- Spot (Leiostomus xanthurus)
- Longtail croaker (Lonchurus lanceolatus)
- King weakfish (Macrodon ancylodon)
- Southern kingfish (Menticirrhus americanus)
- Pacific kingcroaker (Menticirrhus elongatus)
- Gulf kingfish (Menticirrhus littoralis)
- Berrugato real (Menticirrhus nasus)
- Snakehead kingcroaker (Menticirrhus ophicephalus)
- Paita kingcroaker (Menticirrhus paitensis)
- Berrugato panameño (Menticirrhus panamensis)
- Northern kingcroaker (Menticirrhus saxatilis)
- Tallfin croaker (Micropogonias altipinnis)
- Slender croaker (Micropogonias ectenes)
- Whitemouth croaker (Micropogonias furnieri)
- Chano norteño (Micropogonias megalops)
- Atlantic croaker (Micropogonias undulatus)
- Angola croaker (Miracorvina angolensis)
- Smalleye croaker (Nebris microps)
- Pacific smalleye croaker (Nebris occidentalis)
- Reef croaker (Odontoscion dentex)
- Yelloweye croaker (Odontoscion xanthops)
- Blinkard croaker (Ophioscion imiceps)
- Impostor drum (Ophioscion punctatissimus)
- Point-tuza croaker (Ophioscion scierus)
- Snub-nosed croaker (Ophioscion simulus)
- Squint-eyed croaker (Ophioscion strabo)
- Point-nosed croaker (Ophioscion typicus)
- Vermiculated croaker (Ophioscion vermicularis)
- Banded croaker (Paralonchurus brasiliensis)
- Suco croaker (Paralonchurus dumerilii)
- Angel croaker (Paralonchurus goodei)
- Coco croaker (Paralonchurus peruanus)
- Peters' banded croaker (Paralonchurus petersii)
- Bearded banded croaker (Paralonchurus rathbuni)
- High-hat (Pareques acuminatus)
- Festive drum (Pareques fuscovittatus)
- Blackbar drum (Pareques iwamotoi)
- Royal high-hat (Pareques lanfeari)
- Cubbyu (Pareques umbrosus)
- Gungo high-hat (Pareques viola)
- Black drum (Pogonias cromis)
- Deep-water drum (Protosciaena bathytatos)
- New grenada drum (Protosciaena trewavasae)
- Bobo croaker (Pseudotolithus elongatus)
- Guinea croaker (Pseudotolithus epipercus)
- Cameroon croaker (Pseudotolithus moorii)
- Longneck croaker (Pseudotolithus typus)
- Boe drum (Pteroscion peli)
- Blotched tiger-toothed croaker (Pterotolithus maculatus)
- Spotfin croaker (Roncador stearnsii)
- Sciaena deliciosa
- Sciaena fasciata
- Red drum (Sciaenops ocellatus)
- Queenfish (Seriphus politus)
- Chao stardrum (Stellifer chaoi)
- Shortnose stardrum (Stellifer chrysoleuca)
- Colon stardrum (Stellifer colonensis)
- Stellifer ephelis
- Hollow stardrum (Stellifer ericymba)
- White stardrum (Stellifer fuerthii)
- Gray stardrum (Stellifer griseus)
- Silver stardrum (Stellifer illecebrosus)
- American stardrum (Stellifer lanceolatus)
- Smooth stardrum (Stellifer mancorensis)
- Black stardrum (Stellifer melanocheir)
- Smalleye stardrum (Stellifer microps)
- Stellifer minor
- Naso stardrum (Stellifer naso)
- Yawning stardrum (Stellifer oscitans)
- Pizzaro stardrum (Stellifer pizarroensis)
- Rake stardrum (Stellifer rastrifer)
- Venezuelan stardrum (Stellifer venezuelae)
- Softhead stardrum (Stellifer zestocarus)
- Longspine croaker (Umbrina analis)
- Beach drum (Umbrina broussonnetii)
- Bussing's drum (Umbrina bussingi)
- Canary drum (Umbrina canariensis)
- Sand drum (Umbrina coroides)
- Longfin croaker (Umbrina dorsalis)
- Miller drum (Umbrina milliae)
- Umbrina reedi
- Yellowfin croaker (Umbrina roncador)
- Common yellowtail croaker (Umbrina xanti)

== Threadfins ==
- Blue bobo (Polydactylus approximans)
- Small-mouthed threadfin (Polydactylus microstomus)
- Australian threadfin (Polydactylus multiradiatus)
- Atlantic threadfin (Polydactylus octonemus)
- Littlescale threadfin (Polydactylus oligodon)
- Yellow bobo (Polydactylus opercularis)
- Persian blackspot threadfin (Polydactylus persicus)
- Giant African threadfin (Polydactylus quadrifilis)
- Sevenfingered threadfin (Polydactylus virginicus)
- Polynemus aquilonaris
- Blackhand paradise fish (Polynemus melanochir)

== Centrarchids ==
- Mud sunfish (Acantharchus pomotis)
- Shadow bass (Ambloplites ariommus)
- Roanoke bass (Ambloplites cavifrons)
- Ozark bass (Ambloplites constellatus)
- Rock bass (Ambloplites rupestris)
- Flier (Centrarchus macropterus)
- Bluespotted sunfish (Enneacanthus gloriosus)
- Banded sunfish (Enneacanthus obesus)
- Redbreast sunfish (Lepomis auritus)
- Green sunfish (Lepomis cyanellus)
- Pumpkinseed (Lepomis gibbosus)
- Warmouth (Lepomis gulosus)
- Orangespotted sunfish (Lepomis humilis)
- Bluegill (Lepomis macrochirus)
- Dollar sunfish (Lepomis marginatus)
- Longear sunfish (Lepomis megalotis)
- Redear sunfish (Lepomis microlophus)
- Redspotted sunfish (Lepomis miniatus)
- Spotted sunfish (Lepomis punctatus)
- Bantam sunfish (Lepomis symmetricus)
- Redeye bass (Micropterus coosae)
- Smallmouth bass (Micropterus dolomieu)
- Alabama bass (Micropterus henshalli)
- Spotted bass (Micropterus punctulatus)
- Largemouth bass (Micropterus salmoides)
- White crappie (Pomoxis annularis)
- Black crappie (Pomoxis nigromaculatus)

== Snakeheads ==
- Borna snakehead (Channa amphibeus)
- Small snakehead (Channa asiatica)
- Channa burmanica
- Dwarf snakehead (Channa gachua)
- Forest snakehead (Channa lucius)
- Blotched snakehead (Channa maculata)
- Emperor snakehead (Channa marulioides)
- Channa marulius
- Black snakehead (Channa melasoma)
- Giant snakehead (Channa micropeltes)
- Channa panaw
- Channa punctata
- Channa stewartii
- Snakehead murrel (Channa striata)
- Parachanna africana
- Parachanna insignis

== Labrisomids ==
- Island kelpfish (Alloclinus holderi)
- Auchenionchus crinitus
- Auchenionchus microcirrhis
- Auchenionchus variolosus
- Whitecheek blenny (Brockius albigenys)
- Spotcheek blenny (Brockius nigricinctus)
- Green blenny (Brockius striatus)
- Calliclinus geniguttatus
- Calliclinus nudiventris
- Deepwater blenny (Cryptotrema corallinum)
- Foureye rockskipper (Dialommus macrocephalus)
- Sargassum blenny (Exerpes asper)
- Puffcheek blenny (Gobioclinus bucciferus)
- Quillfin blenny (Gobioclinus filamentosus)
- Goggle eye blenny (Gobioclinus gobio)
- Gobioclinus guppyi
- Longfin blenny (Gobioclinus haitiensis)
- Downy blenny (Gobioclinus kalisherae)
- Masquerader hairy blenny (Labrisomus conditus)
- Mock blenny (Labrisomus cricota)
- Labrisomus fernandezianus
- Porehead blenny (Labrisomus multiporosus)
- Hairy blenny (Labrisomus nuchipinnis)
- Chalapo clinid (Labrisomus philippii)
- Largemouth blenny (Labrisomus xanti)
- Goldline blenny (Malacoctenus aurolineatus)
- Diamond blenny (Malacoctenus boehlkei)
- Delalande blenny (Malacoctenus delalandii)
- Fishgod blenny (Malacoctenus ebisui)
- Malacoctenus erdmani
- Sonora blenny (Malacoctenus gigas)
- Malacoctenus gilli
- Redside blenny (Malacoctenus hubbsi)
- Rosy blenny (Malacoctenus macropus)
- Margarita blenny (Malacoctenus margaritae)
- Malacoctenus mexicanus
- Malacoctenus polyporosus
- Malacoctenus sudensis
- Chameleon clinid (Malacoctenus tetranemus)
- Malacoctenus triangulatus
- Barfin blenny (Malacoctenus versicolor)
- Zaca blenny (Malacoctenus zacae)
- Glossy blenny (Malacoctenus zonifer)
- Threadfin blenny (Nemaclinus atelestos)
- Paraclinus arcanus
- Goatee blenny (Paraclinus barbatus)
- Pink blenny (Paraclinus beebei)
- Paraclinus cingulatus
- Paraclinus fasciatus
- Paraclinus grandicomis
- Bald blenny (Paraclinus infrons)
- Reef finspot (Paraclinus integripinnis)
- Marbled blenny (Paraclinus marmoratus)
- Mexican blenny (Paraclinus mexicanus)
- One-eyed blenny (Paraclinus monophthalmus)
- Surf blenny (Paraclinus naeorhegmis)
- Paraclinus nigripinnis
- Paraclinus rubicundus
- Flapscale blenny (Paraclinus sini)
- Paraclinus spectator
- Professor blenny (Paraclinus stephensi)
- Paraclinus tanygnathus
- Smooth-eye blenny (Starksia atlantica)
- Starksia brasiliensis
- Fugitive blenny (Starksia cremnobates)
- Culebra blenny (Starksia culebrae)
- Elongate blenny (Starksia elongata)
- Blackbar blenny (Starksia fasciata)
- Yellow blenny (Starksia fulva)
- Pinstriped blenny (Starksia grammilaga)
- Starksia greenfieldi
- Guadalupe blenny (Starksia guadalupae)
- Spotted blenny (Starksia guttata)
- Ringed blenny (Starksia hassi)
- Starksia langi
- Blackcheek blenny (Starksia lepicoelia)
- Black spot blenny (Starksia melasma)
- Manyscaled blenny (Starksia multilepis)
- Starksia nanodes
- Occidental blenny (Starksia occidentalis)
- Checkered blenny (Starksia ocellata)
- Tawny blenny (Starksia rava)
- Robertson's blenny (Starksia robertsoni)
- Sangrey's blenny (Starksia sangreyae)
- Chessboard blenny (Starksia sluiteri)
- Brokenbar blenny (Starksia smithvanizi)
- Phallic blenny (Starksia spinipenis)
- Key blenny (Starksia starcki)
- Weigt's blenny (Starksia weigti)
- Williams's blenny (Starksia williamsi)
- Redrump blenny (Xenomedea rhodopyga)

== Serranids ==
- Eastern wirrah (Acanthistius ocellatus)
- Peruvian seabass (Acanthistius pictus)
- Swallowtail seaperch (Anthias anthias)
- Yellowfin bass (Anthias nicholsi)
- Swallowtail bass (Anthias woodsi)
- Streamer bass (Baldwinella aureorubens)
- Red barbier (Baldwinella vivanus)
- Pugnose bass (Bullisichthys caribbaeus)
- Twospot sea bass (Centropristis fuscula)
- Bank sea bass (Centropristis ocyurus)
- Centropristis philadelphica
- Black sea bass (Centropristis striata)
- Choranthias salmopunctatus
- Threadnose bass (Choranthias tenuis)
- Dwarf sand perch (Diplectrum bivittatum)
- Diplectrum conceptione
- Orange-spotted sand perch (Diplectrum eumelum)
- Bighead sand perch (Diplectrum euryplectrum)
- Diplectrum formosum
- Highfin sand perch (Diplectrum labarum)
- Mexican sand perch (Diplectrum macropoma)
- Greater sand perch (Diplectrum maximum)
- Inshore sand perch (Diplectrum pacificum)
- Pond perch (Diplectrum radiale)
- Bridled sand perch (Diplectrum rostrum)
- Gulf squirrelfish (Diplectrum sciurus)
- Longtail bass (Hemanthias leptus)
- Rose thread-fin bass (Hemanthias peruanus)
- Damsel bass (Hemanthias signifer)
- Yellowbelly hamlet (Hypoplectrus aberrans)
- Yellowtail hamlet (Hypoplectrus chlorurus)
- Florida barred hamlet (Hypoplectrus floridae)
- Blue hamlet (Hypoplectrus gemma)
- Golden hamlet (Hypoplectrus gummigutta)
- Shy hamlet (Hypoplectrus guttavarius)
- Indigo hamlet (Hypoplectrus indigo)
- Black hamlet (Hypoplectrus nigricans)
- Masked hamlet (Hypoplectrus providencianus)
- Barred hamlet (Hypoplectrus puella)
- Tan hamlet (Hypoplectrus randallorum)
- Butter hamlet (Hypoplectrus unicolor)
- Western orange perch (Lepidoperca filamenta)
- Eyestripe bass (Liopropoma aberrans)
- Candy basslet (Liopropoma carmabi)
- Wrasse bass (Liopropoma eukrines)
- Rainbow basslet (Liopropoma fasciatum)
- Cave bass (Liopropoma mowbrayi)
- Peppermint bass (Liopropoma rubre)
- Earle's splitfin (Luzonichthys earlei)
- Luzonichthys williamsi
- Odontanthias tapui
- Kelp Bass (Paralabrax clathratus)
- Vieja parrot rock-bass (Paralabrax dewegeri)
- Spotted sand bass (Paralabrax maculatofasciatus)
- Barred sand bass (Paralabrax nebulifer)
- Bank bass (Parasphyraenops atrimanus)
- Forktailed bass (Parasphyraenops incisus)
- Plectranthias bauchotae
- Plectranthias bilaticlavia
- Apricot bass (Plectranthias garrupellus)
- Roughtongue bass (Pronotogrammus martinicensis)
- Threadfin bass (Pronotogrammus multifasciatus)
- Pseudanthias caudalis
- Nusa Penida basslet (Pseudanthias cichlops)
- Flame anthias (Pseudanthias ignitus)
- Painted anthias (Pseudanthias pictilis)
- Mirror basslet (Pseudanthias pleurotaenia)
- Pseudanthias ventralis
- Reef bass (Pseudogramma gregoryi)
- Pseudogramma guineensis
- Pacific reef bass (Pseudogramma thaumasium)
- Flathead perch (Rainfordia opercularis)
- Mottled soapfish (Rypticus bicolor)
- Freckled soapfish (Rypticus bistrispinus)
- Largespotted soapfish (Rypticus bornoi)
- Slope soapfish (Rypticus carpenteri)
- Whitespotted soapfish (Rypticus maculatus)
- Blackfin soapfish (Rypticus nigripinnis)
- Plain soapfish (Rypticus randalli)
- Greater soapfish (Rypticus saponaceus)
- Spotted soapfish (Rypticus subbifrenatus)
- School bass (Schultzea beta)
- Pygmy sea bass (Serraniculus pumilio)
- Serranus accraensis
- Deepwater serrano (Serranus aequidens)
- Serranus africanus
- Orangeback bass (Serranus annularis)
- Blackear bass (Serranus atrobranchus)
- Lantern bass (Serranus baldwini)
- Comber (Serranus cabrilla)
- Caribbean snow bass (Serranus chionaraia)
- Twinspot bass (Serranus flaviventris)
- Brown comber (Serranus hepatus)
- Serranus heterurus
- Flag serrano (Serranus huascarii)
- Crosshatch bass (Serranus luciopercanus)
- Pallid bass (Serranus maytagi)
- Saddle bass (Serranus notospilus)
- Tattler (Serranus phoebe)
- Barred serrano (Serranus psittacinus)
- Serranus sanctaehelenae
- Painted comber (Serranus scriba)
- Serranus stilbostigma
- Belted sandfish (Serranus subligarius)
- Tobacco basslet (Serranus tabacarius)
- Cocos serrano (Serranus tico)
- Harlequin bass (Serranus tigrinus)
- Chalk bass (Serranus tortugarum)

== Chaenopsids ==
- Roughhead blenny (Acanthemblemaria aspera)
- Clubhead barnacle blenny (Acanthemblemaria balanorum)
- Speckled blenny (Acanthemblemaria betinensis)
- Papillose blenny (Acanthemblemaria chaplini)
- Browncheek blenny (Acanthemblemaria crockeri)
- Bluntspine blenny (Acanthemblemaria exilispinus)
- Stalk blenny (Acanthemblemaria greenfieldi)
- Hancock's blenny (Acanthemblemaria hancocki)
- Acanthemblemaria hastingsi
- White-cheeked blenny (Acanthemblemaria johnsoni)
- Mexican barnacle blenny (Acanthemblemaria macrospilus)
- Secretary blenny (Acanthemblemaria maria)
- Medusa blenny (Acanthemblemaria medusa)
- Spotjaw blenny (Acanthemblemaria rivasi)
- Spinyhead blenny (Acanthemblemaria spinosa)
- Orangethroat pikeblenny (Chaenopsis alepidota)
- Yellowface pikeblenny (Chaenopsis limbaughi)
- Bluethroat pikeblenny (Chaenopsis ocellata)
- Resh pikeblenny (Chaenopsis resh)
- Freckled pikeblenny (Chaenopsis roseola)
- Plume blenny (Cirriemblemaria lucasana)
- Angel blenny (Coralliozetus angelicus)
- Barcheek blenny (Coralliozetus boehlkei)
- Twinhorn blenny (Coralliozetus cardonae)
- Scarletfin blenny (Coralliozetus micropes)
- Spikefin blenny (Coralliozetus rosenblatti)
- Springer's tube blenny (Coralliozetus springeri)
- Reefsand blenny (Ekemblemaria myersi)
- Moth blenny (Ekemblemaria nigra)
- Banner blenny (Emblemaria atlantica)
- Emblemaria australis
- Twospot blenny (Emblemaria biocellata)
- Caribbean blenny (Emblemaria caldwelli)
- Colombian blenny (Emblemaria caycedoi)
- Venezuelan blenny (Emblemaria diphyodontis)
- Emblemaria hudsoni
- Gulf signal blenny (Emblemaria hypacanthus)
- Emblemaria pandionis
- Sailfin signal blenny (Emblemaria piratica)
- Pirate blenny (Emblemaria piratula)
- Ribbon blenny (Emblemaria vitta)
- Blackhead blenny (Emblemariopsis bahamensis)
- Shorthead blenny (Emblemariopsis bottomei)
- Caribbean flagfin blenny (Emblemariopsis carib)
- Glass blenny (Emblemariopsis diaphana)
- Fine-cirrus blenny (Emblemariopsis leptocirris)
- Emblemariopsis occidentalis
- Red banner blenny (Emblemariopsis ramirezi)
- Ruetzler's blenny (Emblemariopsis ruetzleri)
- Emblemariopsis signifer
- Tayrona blenny (Emblemariopsis tayrona)
- Wrasse blenny (Hemiemblemaria simulus)
- Arrow blenny (Lucayablennius zingaro)
- Sarcastic fringehead (Neoclinus blanchardi)
- Neoclinus bryope
- Neoclinus chihiroe
- Neoclinus lacunicola
- Neoclinus nudus
- Neoclinus okazakii
- Yellowfin fringehead (Neoclinus stephensae)
- Neoclinus toshimaensis
- One-spot fringehead (Neoclinus uninotatus)
- Protemblemaria bicirrus
- Protemblemaria punctata
- Panamanian worm blenny (Stathmonotus culebrai)
- Naked blenny (Stathmonotus gymnodermis)
- Blackbelly blenny (Stathmonotus hemphillii)
- Mexican worm blenny (Stathmonotus lugubris)
- California worm blenny (Stathmonotus sinuscalifornici)
- Southern eelgrass blenny (Stathmonotus stahli)
- Northern eelgrass blenny (Stathmonotus tekla)

== Combtooth blennies ==
- Sphinx blenny (Aidablennius sphynx)
- Alloblennius anuchalis
- Jugular blenny (Alloblennius jugularis)
- Dwarf blenny (Alloblennius parvus)
- Alloblennius pictus
- Alticus anjouanae
- Pacific leaping blenny (Alticus arnoldorum)
- Kirk's blenny (Alticus kirkii)
- Alticus magnusi
- Alticus monochrus
- Alticus montanoi
- Alticus orientalis
- Alticus sertatus
- Marquesan rockskipper (Alticus simplicirrus)
- Andamia amphibius
- Andamia pacifica
- Aden blenny (Antennablennius adenensis)
- Moustached rockskipper (Antennablennius australis)
- Horned rockskipper (Antennablennius bifilum)
- Antennablennius ceylonensis
- Arabian blenny (Antennablennius hypenetes)
- Simony's blenny (Antennablennius simonyi)
- Orangedotted blenny (Antennablennius variopunctatus)
- Dussumier's blenny (Aspidontus dussumieri)
- False cleanerfish (Aspidontus taeniatus)
- Aspidontus tractus
- Atrosalarias fuscus
- Atrosalarias holomelas
- Atrosalarias hosokawai
- Lined rockskipper (Blenniella bilitonensis)
- Pacific blue-spotted blenny (Blenniella caudolineata)
- Blenniella chrysospilos
- Striped rockskipper (Blenniella cyanostigma)
- Picture rockskipper (Blenniella gibbifrons)
- Dashed-line blenny (Blenniella interrupta)
- Blenniella leopardus
- Blenniella paula
- Eyespot blenny (Blenniella periophthalmus)
- Blennius normani
- Butterfly blenny (Blennius ocellaris)
- Looseskin blenny (Chalaroderma capito)
- Two-eyed blenny (Chalaroderma ocellata)
- Striped blenny (Chasmodes bosquianus)
- Stretchjaw blenny (Chasmodes longimaxilla)
- Florida blenny (Chasmodes saburrae)
- Cirripectes alboapicalis
- Kimberley blenny (Cirripectes alleni)
- Blackflap blenny (Cirripectes auritus)
- Chestnut blenny (Cirripectes castaneus)
- Lady Musgrave blenny (Cirripectes chelomatus)
- Filamentous blenny (Cirripectes filamentosus)
- Dusky spotted blenny (Cirripectes fuscoguttatus)
- Cirripectes gilberti
- Cirripectes heemstraorum
- Cirripectes hutchinsi
- Cirripectes imitator
- Cirripectes jenningsi
- Cirripectes kuwamurai
- Gargantuan blenny (Cirripectes obscurus)
- Flaming blenny (Cirripectes perustus)
- Cirripectes polyzona
- Squiggly blenny (Cirripectes quagga)
- Cirripectes randalli
- Spotted eyelash blenny (Cirripectes springeri)
- Red-streaked blenny (Cirripectes stigmaticus)
- Red-head blenny (Cirripectes vanderbilti)
- Banded fringe blenny (Cirripectes variolosus)
- Cirripectes viriosus
- Cirrisalarias bunares
- Montagu's blenny (Coryphoblennius galerita)
- Triplespot blenny (Crossosalarias macrospilus)
- Dodekablennos fraseri
- Fourline blenny (Ecsenius aequalis)
- Ecsenius alleni
- Aron's blenny (Ecsenius aroni)
- Australian blenny (Ecsenius australianus)
- Axelrod's combtooth-blenny (Ecsenius axelrodi)
- Banda clown blenny (Ecsenius bandanus)
- Bath's comb-tooth (Ecsenius bathi)
- Bicolor blenny (Ecsenius bicolor)
- Twin-spot combtooth-blenny (Ecsenius bimaculatus)
- Bluebelly blenny (Ecsenius caeruliventris)
- Collete's blenny (Ecsenius collettei)
- Ecsenius dentex
- Ecsenius dilemma
- Ecsenius fijiensis
- Ecsenius fourmanoiri
- Smooth-fin blenny (Ecsenius frontalis)
- Red sea mimic blenny (Ecsenius gravieri)
- Ecsenius isos
- Lined combtooth-blenny (Ecsenius lineatus)
- Blue-head combtooth-blenny (Ecsenius lividanalis)
- Lubbock's combtooth-blenny (Ecsenius lubbocki)
- Queensland blenny (Ecsenius mandibularis)
- Java combtooth-blenny (Ecsenius melarchus)
- Midas blenny (Ecsenius midas)
- Ecsenius minutus
- Ecsenius monoculus
- Nalolo (Ecsenius nalolo)
- Black combtooth-blenny (Ecsenius namiyei)
- Ecsenius niue
- Ecsenius oculatus
- Ocular blenny (Ecsenius oculus)
- Yellow-eye combtooth-blenny (Ecsenius ops)
- Comical blenny (Ecsenius opsifrontalis)
- Ecsenius pardus
- Ecsenius paroculus
- Pictus blenny (Ecsenius pictus)
- Andaman combtooth-blenny (Ecsenius polystictus)
- Ecsenius portenoyi
- Ecsenius prooculis
- Gulf blenny (Ecsenius pulcher)
- Schroeder's combtooth-blenny (Ecsenius schroederi)
- Saddle blenny (Ecsenius sellifer)
- Ecsenius shirleyae
- Great barrier reef blenny (Ecsenius stictus)
- Tail-spot combtooth-blenny (Ecsenius stigmatura)
- Ecsenius taeniatus
- Ecsenius tessera
- Three-lined blenny (Ecsenius trilineatus)
- Pale-spotted combtooth-blenny (Ecsenius yaeyamaensis)
- Enchelyurus ater
- Enchelyurus brunneolus
- Enchelyurus flavipes
- Krauss' blenny (Enchelyurus kraussii)
- Enchelyurus petersi
- West African rockhopper (Entomacrodus cadenati)
- Bartail blenny (Entomacrodus caudofasciatus)
- Notchfin blenny (Entomacrodus chiostictus)
- Entomacrodus corneliae
- Pacific rockskipper (Entomacrodus cymatobiotus)
- Wavyline rockskipper (Entomacrodus decussatus)
- Fringelip rockskipper (Entomacrodus epalzeocheilos)
- Entomacrodus lemuria
- Entomacrodus lighti
- Entomacrodus longicirrus
- Entomacrodus macrospilus
- Entomacrodus marmoratus
- Pearl blenny (Entomacrodus nigricans)
- Tattoo-chin rockskipper (Entomacrodus niuafoouensis)
- Entomacrodus randalli
- Entomacrodus rofeni
- Seale's blenny (Entomacrodus sealei)
- Stellar rockskipper (Entomacrodus stellifer)
- Entomacrodus strasburgi
- Blackspotted rockskipper (Entomacrodus striatus)
- Textile blenny (Entomacrodus textilis)
- Reef margin blenny (Entomacrodus thalassinus)
- Vermiculated blenny (Entomacrodus vermiculatus)
- Entomacrodus vomerinus
- Entomacrodus williamsi
- Leopard blenny (Exallias brevis)
- Delicate blenny (Glyptoparus delicatulus)
- Highbrow rockskipper (Hirculops cornifer)
- West African speckled blenny (Hypleurochilus aequipinnis)
- Hypleurochilus bananensis
- Hypleurochilus bermudensis
- Zebratail blenny (Hypleurochilus caudovittatus)
- Hypleurochilus fissicornis
- Hypleurochilus geminatus
- Hypleurochilus langi
- Featherduster blenny (Hypleurochilus multifilis)
- Hypleurochilus pseudoaequipinnis
- Hypleurochilus springeri
- Hypsoblennius brevipinnis
- Longhorn blenny (Hypsoblennius exstochilus)
- Bay blenny (Hypsoblennius gentilis)
- Notchbrow blenny (Hypsoblennius gilberti)
- Feather blenny (Hypsoblennius hentz)
- Tessellated blenny (Hypsoblennius invemar)
- Freckled blenny (Hypsoblennius ionthas)
- Mussel blenny (Hypsoblennius jenkinsi)
- Peruvian blenny (Hypsoblennius paytensis)
- Hypsoblennius robustus
- Hypsoblennius sordidus
- Imspringer (Istiblennius bellus)
- Istiblennius colei
- Dussumier's rockskipper (Istiblennius dussumieri)
- Smoothlipped blenny (Istiblennius edentulus)
- Istiblennius flaviumbrinus
- Black-lined blenny (Istiblennius lineatus)
- Peacock rockskipper (Istiblennius meleagris)
- Istiblennius muelleri
- Scarface rockskipper (Istiblennius pox)
- Istiblennius rivulatus
- Spotted rockskipper (Istiblennius spilotus)
- Istiblennius steindachneri
- Pallid rockskipper (Istiblennius unicolor)
- Istiblennius zebra
- Laiphognathus longispinis
- Spotty blenny (Laiphognathus multimaculatus)
- Shanny (Lipophrys pholis)
- Lipophrys trigloides
- Fowler's rockskipper (Litobranchus fowleri)
- Lupinoblennius nicholsi
- Upside-down harptail blenny (Meiacanthus abditus)
- Eyelash harptail-blenny (Meiacanthus atrodorsalis)
- Bundoon blenny (Meiacanthus bundoon)
- Meiacanthus crinitus
- Meiacanthus cyanopterus
- One-striped poison-fang blenny (Meiacanthus ditrema)
- Meiacanthus fraseri
- Meiacanthus geminatus
- Striped poison-fang blenny (Meiacanthus grammistes)
- Meiacanthus kamoharai
- Lined fangblenny (Meiacanthus lineatus)
- Yellow fangblenny (Meiacanthus luteus)
- Mozambique fangblenny (Meiacanthus mossambicus)
- Blackline fangblenny (Meiacanthus nigrolineatus)
- Meiacanthus oualanensis
- Meiacanthus procne
- Disco blenny (Meiacanthus smithi)
- Meiacanthus tongaensis
- Meiacanthus urostigma
- Meiacanthus vicinus
- One-striped fangblenny (Meiacanthus vittatus)
- Adriatic blenny (Microlipophrys adriaticus)
- Microlipophrys caboverdensis
- Microlipophrys canevae
- Microlipophrys dalmatinus
- Black-headed blenny (Microlipophrys nigriceps)
- Microlipophrys velifer
- Mimoblennius atrocinctus
- Mimoblennius cas
- Fringed blenny (Mimoblennius cirrosus)
- Rusi blenny (Mimoblennius rusi)
- Christmas blenny (Nannosalarias nativitatis)
- Omobranchus anolius
- Bandit blenny (Omobranchus banditus)
- Omobranchus elegans
- Chevroned blenny (Omobranchus elongatus)
- Omobranchus fasciolatoceps
- Omobranchus fasciolatus
- Gossamer blenny (Omobranchus ferox)
- Germain's blenny (Omobranchus germaini)
- Omobranchus lineolatus
- Omobranchus loxozonus
- Omobranchus obliquus
- Japanese blenny (Omobranchus punctatus)
- Omobranchus rotundiceps
- Omobranchus verticalis
- Kappie blenny (Omobranchus woodi)
- Omobranchus zebra
- Omox lupus
- Ophioblennius atlanticus
- Ophioblennius macclurei
- Large-banded blenny (Ophioblennius steindachneri)
- Ophioblennius trinitatis
- Parablennius cornutus
- Parablennius cyclops
- Parablennius dialloi
- Tompot blenny (Parablennius gattorugine)
- Parablennius goreensis
- Mystery blenny (Parablennius incognitus)
- Parablennius intermedius
- Crested blenny (Parablennius laticlavius)
- Seaweed blenny (Parablennius marmoreus)
- Cheekspot blenny (Parablennius opercularis)
- Rock-pool blenny (Parablennius parvicornis)
- Ringneck blenny (Parablennius pilicornis)
- Parablennius postoculomaculatus
- Longstriped blenny (Parablennius rouxi)
- Portuguese blenny (Parablennius ruber)
- Parablennius salensis
- Rusty blenny (Parablennius sanguinolentus)
- Parablennius sierraensis
- Tasmanian blenny (Parablennius tasmanianus)
- Tentacled blenny (Parablennius tentacularis)
- Tasseled blenny (Parablennius thysanius)
- Yatabe blenny (Parablennius yatabei)
- Zvonimir's blenny (Parablennius zvonimiri)
- Parahypsos piersoni
- Big-nose blenny (Paralticus amboinensis)
- Hepburn's blenny (Parenchelyurus hepburni)
- Parenchelyurus hyena
- Kosi rockskipper (Pereulixia kosiensis)
- Arabian fangblenny (Petroscirtes ancylodon)
- Short-head sabretooth blenny (Petroscirtes breviceps)
- Deceiver fangblenny (Petroscirtes fallax)
- Wolf fangblenny (Petroscirtes lupus)
- Petroscirtes marginatus
- Highfinned blenny (Petroscirtes mitratus)
- Petroscirtes pylei
- Petroscirtes springeri
- Thepas' sabretooth blenny (Petroscirtes thepassii)
- Variable sabretooth blenny (Petroscirtes variabilis)
- Bearded sabretooth blenny (Petroscirtes xestus)
- Sabertooth blenny (Plagiotremus azaleus)
- Blue-stripe blenny (Plagiotremus ewaensis)
- Plagiotremus flavus
- Biting blenny (Plagiotremus goslinei)
- Bicolour fangblenny (Plagiotremus laudandus)
- Imposter fangblenny (Plagiotremus phenax)
- Bluestriped fangblenny (Plagiotremus rhinorhynchos)
- Plagiotremus spilistius
- Mimic blenny (Plagiotremus tapeinosoma)
- Townsend's fangblenny (Plagiotremus townsendi)
- Praealticus bilineatus
- Praealticus caesius
- Praealticus dayi
- Crenulate-lipped rockskipper (Praealticus labrovittatus)
- Praealticus margaritatus
- Praealticus multistriatus
- Praealticus oortii
- Marianas rockskipper (Praealticus poptae)
- Praealticus semicrenatus
- Praealticus striatus
- Praealticus tanegasimae
- Praealticus triangulus
- Rhabdoblennius nigropunctatus
- Rhabdoblennius nitidus
- Barchin blenny (Rhabdoblennius rhabdotrachelus)
- Snow blenny (Rhabdoblennius snowi)
- Salaria basilisca
- Freshwater blenny (Salaria fluviatilis)
- Peacock blenny (Salaria pavo)
- White-spotted blenny (Salarias alboguttatus)
- Seram blenny (Salarias ceramensis)
- Banded jewelled-blenny (Salarias fasciatus)
- Blue-spot blenny (Salarias guttatus)
- Salarias luctuosus
- Salarias nigrocinctus
- Salarias obscurus
- Patzner's blenny (Salarias patzneri)
- Snowflake blenny (Salarias ramosus)
- Segmented blenny (Salarias segmentatus)
- Salarias sexfilum
- Salarias sibogai
- Fringelip blenny (Salarias sinuosus)
- Scartella caboverdiana
- Molly Miller (Scartella cristata)
- Maned blenny (Scartella emarginata)
- Scartella itajobi
- Scartichthys crapulatus
- Giant blenny (Scartichthys gigas)
- Scartichthys variolatus
- Scartichthys viridis
- Seychelles blenny (Stanulus seychellensis)
- Talbot's blenny (Stanulus talboti)
- Japanese snake blenny (Xiphasia matsubarai)
- Hairtail blenny (Xiphasia setifer)

== Sea chubs ==
- Girella freminvillei
- Opaleye (Girella nigricans)
- Gulf opal eye (Girella simplicidens)
- Zebra perch (Hermosilla azurea)
- Kyphosus analogus
- Brown chub (Kyphosus bigibbus)
- Blue sea chub (Kyphosus cinerascens)
- Cortez chub (Kyphosus elegans)
- Revillagigedo sea chub (Kyphosus lutescens)
- Bermuda sea chub (Kyphosus sectatrix)
- Brassy chub (Kyphosus vaigiensis)
- Halfmoon (Medialuna californiensis)

== Goatfishes ==
- Mexican goatfish (Mulloidichthys dentatus)
- Yellow goatfish (Mulloidichthys martinicus)
- Mullus auratus
- Striped goatfish (Mullus barbatus)
- Striped red mullet (Mullus surmuletus)
- Thicklipped goatfish (Parupeneus crassilabris)
- Manybar goatfish (Parupeneus multifasciatus)
- Parupeneus posteli
- Bigscale goatfish (Pseudupeneus grandisquamis)
- Spotted goatfish (Pseudupeneus maculatus)
- Short-fin goatfish (Upeneus oligospilus)
- Dwarf goatfish (Upeneus parvus)

== Hawkfishes ==
- Twospot hawkfish (Amblycirrhitus bimacula)
- Redspotted hawkfish (Amblycirrhitus pinos)
- Amblycirrhitus unimacula
- Spotted hawkfish (Cirrhitichthys aprinus)
- Dwarf hawkfish (Cirrhitichthys falco)
- Coral hawkfish (Cirrhitichthys oxycephalus)
- Redbanded hawkfish (Cirrhitops fasciatus)
- Cirrhitops hubbardi
- West African hawkfish (Cirrhitus atlanticus)
- Stocky hawkfish (Cirrhitus pinnulatus)
- Giant hawkfish (Cirrhitus rivulatus)
- Swallowtail hawkfish (Cyprinocirrhites polyactis)
- Wilhelm's hawkfish (Itycirrhitus wilhelmi)
- Flame hawkfish (Neocirrhites armatus)
- Splendid hawkfish (Notocirrhitus splendens)
- Longnose hawkfish (Oxycirrhites typus)
- Arc-eye hawkfish (Paracirrhites arcatus)
- Black-sided hawkfish (Paracirrhites forsteri)
- Whitespot hawkfish (Paracirrhites hemistictus)
- Paracirrhites nisus
- Paracirrhites xanthus

== Microdesmids ==
- Pugjaw wormfish (Cerdale floridana)
- Flagtail wormfish (Clarkichthys bilineatus)
- Microdesmus aethiopicus
- Reef wormfish (Microdesmus bahianus)
- Stippled wormfish (Microdesmus carri)
- Lancetail wormfish (Microdesmus lanceolatus)
- Pink wormfish (Microdesmus longipinnis)
- Fire dartfish (Nemateleotris magnifica)
- Parioglossus formosus
- Parioglossus palustris
- Parioglossus rainfordi
- Yellow dartfish (Parioglossus raoi)
- Striped dartfish (Parioglossus taeniatus)
- Blue dartfish (Ptereleotris calliura)
- Panamic dartfish (Ptereleotris carinata)
- Helen's dartfish (Ptereleotris helenae)
- Brazilian dartfish (Ptereleotris randalli)

== Clinids ==
- Lace klipfish (Blennioclinus brachycephalus)
- Silverbubble klipfish (Blennioclinus stella)
- Snaky klipfish (Blennophis anguillaris)
- Striped klipfish (Blennophis striatus)
- Slender platanna-klipfish (Cancelloxus burrelli)
- Whiteblotched klipfish (Cancelloxus elongatus)
- Cancelloxus longior
- Barbelled klipfish (Cirrhibarbis capensis)
- Fleet klipfish (Climacoporus navalis)
- Cline (Clinitrachus argentatus)
- Ladder klipfish (Clinoporus biporosus)
- Sad klipfish (Clinus acuminatus)
- Agile klipfish (Clinus agilis)
- Clinus arborescens
- Onrust klipfish (Clinus berrisfordi)
- Cape klipfish (Clinus brevicristatus)
- Bluntnose klipfish (Clinus cottoides)
- Helen's klipfish (Clinus helenae)
- Westcoast klipfish (Clinus heterodon)
- Chinese klipfish (Clinus nematopterus)
- Robust klipfish (Clinus robustus)
- Kelp klipfish (Clinus rotundifrons)
- Super klipfish (Clinus superciliosus)
- Bull klipfish (Clinus taurus)
- Speckled klipfish (Clinus venustris)
- Oldman klipfish (Clinus woodi)
- Short-tassel weedfish (Cologrammus flavescens)
- Silver-sided weedfish (Cristiceps argyropleura)
- Golden weedfish (Cristiceps aurantiacus)
- Crested weedfish (Cristiceps australis)
- Orange clinid (Ericentrus rubrus)
- Mousey klipfish (Fucomimus mus)
- Gibbonsia elegans
- Striped kelpfish (Gibbonsia metzi)
- Crevice kelpfish (Gibbonsia montereyensis)
- Adelaide's weedfish (Heteroclinus adelaidae)
- Heteroclinus antinectes
- Kelp weedfish (Heteroclinus eckloniae)
- Heteroclinus equiradiatus
- Seven-bar weedfish (Heteroclinus heptaeolus)
- Johnston's weedfish (Heteroclinus johnstoni)
- Heteroclinus kuiteri
- Tasselled weedfish (Heteroclinus macrophthalmus)
- Large-nose weedfish (Heteroclinus nasutus)
- Common weedfish (Heteroclinus perspicillatus)
- Little weedfish (Heteroclinus puellarum)
- Rosy weedfish (Heteroclinus roseus)
- Sharp-nose weedfish (Heteroclinus tristis)
- Whitelegg's weedfish (Heteroclinus whiteleggii)
- Wilson's weedfish (Heteroclinus wilsoni)
- Giant kelpfish (Heterostichus rostratus)
- Nosestripe klipfish (Muraenoclinus dorsalis)
- Sailfin clinid (Myxodes cristatus)
- Myxodes viridis
- Earspot snakeblenny (Ophiclinops hutchinsi)
- Variegated snake-blenny (Ophiclinops varius)
- Dusky snakeblenny (Ophiclinus antarcticus)
- Shortfin snakeblenny (Ophiclinus brevipinnis)
- Frosted snake-blenny (Ophiclinus gabrieli)
- Black-back snake-blenny (Ophiclinus gracilis)
- Variable snake-blenny (Ophiclinus ningulus)
- Whiteblotch snakeblenny (Ophiclinus pectoralis)
- Pavoclinus caeruleopunctatus
- Grass klipfish (Pavoclinus graminis)
- Rippled klipfish (Pavoclinus laurentii)
- Slinky klipfish (Pavoclinus litorafontis)
- Bearded klipfish (Pavoclinus mentalis)
- Mya's klipfish (Pavoclinus myae)
- Peacock klipfish (Pavoclinus pavo)
- Deepwater klipfish (Pavoclinus profundus)
- Deep-reef klipfish (Pavoclinus smalei)
- Ribeiroclinus eigenmanni
- Leafy klipfish (Smithichthys fucorum)
- Springeratus xanthosoma
- Dusky crawler (Sticharium clarkae)
- Sand crawler (Sticharium dorsale)
- Platanna klipfish (Xenopoclinus kochi)
- Leprous platanna-klipfish (Xenopoclinus leprosus)

== Wrasses ==
- Scale-rayed wrasse (Acantholabrus palloni)
- Sand wrasse (Ammolabrus dicrus)
- Blue-spotted wrasse (Anampses caeruleopunctatus)
- Psychedelic wrasse (Anampses chrysocephalus)
- Pearl wrasse (Anampses cuvier)
- Elegant wrasse (Anampses elegans)
- Blue-striped orange tamarin (Anampses femininus)
- Geographic wrasse (Anampses geographicus)
- Blue and yellow wrasse (Anampses lennardi)
- White-spotted wrasse (Anampses melanurus)
- Spotted wrasse (Anampses meleagrides)
- Black-banded wrasse (Anampses neoguinaicus)
- Yellow-breasted wrasse (Anampses twistii)
- Natal wrasse (Anchichoerops natalensis)
- Black-spotted parrotfish (Austrolabrus maculatus)
- Bodianus albotaeniatus
- Lyre-tail hogfish (Bodianus anthioides)
- Axilspot hogfish (Bodianus axillaris)
- Hawaiian pigfish (Bodianus bathycapros)
- Crescent banded hogfish (Bodianus bilunulatus)
- Twospot hogfish (Bodianus bimaculatus)
- Bodianus busellatus
- Cylindrical hogfish (Bodianus cylindriatus)
- Diana's hogfish (Bodianus diana)
- Bodianus dictynna
- Mexican hogfish (Bodianus diplotaenia)
- Brown hogfish (Bodianus eclancheri)
- Bodianus flavifrons
- Island hogfish (Bodianus insularis)
- Lined hogfish (Bodianus leucosticticus)
- Blackfin hogfish (Bodianus loxozonus)
- Giant hogfish (Bodianus macrognathos)
- Black-banded hogfish (Bodianus macrourus)
- Bodianus masudai
- Split-level hogfish (Bodianus mesothorax)
- Bay of Bengal hogfish (Bodianus neilli)
- Blackspot hogfish (Bodianus opercularis)
- Golden-spot hogfish (Bodianus perditio)
- Bodianus prognathus
- Spotfin hogfish (Bodianus pulchellus)
- Spanish hogfish (Bodianus rufus)
- Sunrise wrasse (Bodianus sanguineus)
- Fourline hogfish (Bodianus trilineatus)
- Red pigfish (Bodianus unimaculatus)
- Bodianus vulpinus
- Carolines parrotfish (Calotomus carolinus)
- Calotomus japonicus
- Spinytooth parrotfish (Calotomus spinidens)
- Viridescent parrotfish (Calotomus viridescens)
- Yellowbar parrotfish (Calotomus zonarchus)
- Small-mouthed wrasse (Centrolabrus exoletus)
- Red-speckled parrotfish (Cetoscarus bicolor)
- Cetoscarus ocellatus
- Abudjubbe's splendor wrasse (Cheilinus abudjubbe)
- Floral wrasse (Cheilinus chlorourus)
- Red-breasted wrasse (Cheilinus fasciatus)
- Broomtail wrasse (Cheilinus lunulatus)
- Pointed-head wrasse (Cheilinus oxycephalus)
- Cheilinus quinquecinctus
- Tripletail wrasse (Cheilinus trilobatus)
- Cigar wrasse (Cheilio inermis)
- Bluemoon parrotfish (Chlorurus atrilunula)
- Bleeker's parrotfish (Chlorurus bleekeri)
- Pink-margined parrotfish (Chlorurus capistratoides)
- Blue humphead parrotfish (Chlorurus cyanescens)
- Captain parrotfish (Chlorurus enneacanthus)
- Tan-faced parrotfish (Chlorurus frontalis)
- Sinai parrotfish (Chlorurus genazonatus)
- Chlorurus gibbus
- Palecheek parrotfish (Chlorurus japanensis)
- Pacific steephead parrotfish (Chlorurus microrhinos)
- Knothead parrotfish (Chlorurus oedema)
- Spectacled parrotfish (Chlorurus perspicillatus)
- Chlorurus rhakoura
- Daisy parrotfish (Chlorurus sordidus)
- Chlorurus spilurus
- Indian Ocean steephead parrotfish (Chlorurus strongylocephalus)
- Troschel's parrotfish (Chlorurus troschelii)
- Orange-dotted tuskfish (Choerodon anchorago)
- Bluespotted tuskfish (Choerodon cauteroma)
- Grass tuskfish (Choerodon cephalotes)
- Blue tuskfish (Choerodon cyanodus)
- Harlequin tuskfish (Choerodon fasciatus)
- Bridled tuskfish (Choerodon frenatus)
- Choerodon gomoni
- Graphic tuskfish (Choerodon graphicus)
- Jordan's tuskfish (Choerodon jordani)
- Choerodon margaritiferus
- Choerodon melanostigma
- Dark-spot tuskfish (Choerodon monostigma)
- White-patch tuskfish (Choerodon oligacanthus)
- Robust tuskfish (Choerodon robustus)
- Baldchin groper (Choerodon rubescens)
- Wedge-tailed tuskfish (Choerodon sugillatum)
- Venus tuskfish (Choerodon venustus)
- Redstripe tuskfish (Choerodon vitta)
- Purple eyebrowed tuskfish (Choerodon zamboangae)
- Black-blotch tuskfish (Choerodon zosterophorus)
- Red-fin fairy wrasse (Cirrhilabrus adornatus)
- Orangeback fairy-wrasse (Cirrhilabrus aurantidorsalis)
- Deepwater wrasse (Cirrhilabrus bathyphilus)
- Beau's wrasse (Cirrhilabrus beauperryi)
- Purple-boned wrasse (Cirrhilabrus blatteus)
- Cenderawasih wrasse (Cirrhilabrus cenderawasih)
- Cirrhilabrus claire
- Conde's fairy wrasse (Cirrhilabrus condei)
- Orange-striped fairy wrasse (Cirrhilabrus earlei)
- Yellowfin fairy-wrasse (Cirrhilabrus flavidorsalis)
- Johnson's wrasse (Cirrhilabrus johnsoni)
- Flame wrasse (Cirrhilabrus jordani)
- Katherine's wrasse (Cirrhilabrus katherinae)
- Cirrhilabrus katoi
- Laboute's wrasse (Cirrhilabrus laboutei)
- Long-tailed wrasse (Cirrhilabrus lanceolatus)
- Purple-lined wrasse (Cirrhilabrus lineatus)
- Lubbock's wrasse (Cirrhilabrus lubbocki)
- Cirrhilabrus lunatus
- Yellowband wrasse (Cirrhilabrus luteovittatus)
- Marjorie's wrasse (Cirrhilabrus marjorie)
- Cirrhilabrus melanomarginatus
- Cirrhilabrus morrisoni
- Cirrhilabrus punctatus
- Blue-margin fairy-wrasse (Cirrhilabrus pylei)
- Cirrhilabrus randalli
- Rose-band fairy wrasse (Cirrhilabrus roseafascia)
- Pink-margin wrasse (Cirrhilabrus rubrimarginatus)
- Redfin wrasse (Cirrhilabrus rubripinnis)
- Social wrasse (Cirrhilabrus rubriventralis)
- Cirrhilabrus sanguineus
- Scotts' wrasse (Cirrhilabrus scottorum)
- Walindi fairy-wrasse (Cirrhilabrus walindi)
- Cirrhilabrus walshi
- Clepticus brasiliensis
- Creole wrasse (Clepticus parrae)
- Coris atlantica
- Blushing wrasse (Coris auricularis)
- Goldlined coris (Coris aurilineata)
- Clown coris (Coris aygula)
- Light colored wrasse fish (Coris ballieui)
- Batu coris (Coris batuensis)
- Spottail coris (Coris caudimacula)
- Coris centralis
- African wrasse (Coris cuvieri)
- Debuen's coris (Coris debueni)
- Pale-barred coris (Coris dorsomacula)
- Yellowstripe coris (Coris flavovittata)
- Queen coris (Coris formosa)
- African clown wrasse (Coris gaimard)
- Hewett's coris (Coris hewetti)
- Mediterranean rainbow wrasse (Coris julis)
- Marquesan coris (Coris marquesensis)
- Coris musume
- Combfish (Coris picta)
- Blackstripe coris (Coris pictoides)
- Red and green coris (Coris roseoviridis)
- Sandager's wrasse (Coris sandeyeri)
- Coris variegata
- Elegant coris (Coris venusta)
- Bluelip parrotfish (Cryptotomus roseus)
- Goldsinny wrasse (Ctenolabrus rupestris)
- Brown-lined wrasse (Cymolutes lecluse)
- Knife razorfish (Cymolutes praetextatus)
- Collared knifefish (Cymolutes torquatus)
- Decodon melasma
- Decodon puellaris
- Yellowtail tubelip (Diproctacanthus xanthurus)
- Dwarf wrasse (Doratonotus megalepis)
- Allen's polly (Dotalabrus alleni)
- Pretty polly (Dotalabrus aurantiacus)
- Dwarf slingjaw wrasse (Epibulus brevis)
- Sling-jaw wrasse (Epibulus insidiator)
- Snakeskin wrasse (Eupetrichthys angustipes)
- Birdfish (Gomphosus caeruleus)
- Bird-nose wrasse (Gomphosus varius)
- Blue weed whiting (Haletta semifasciata)
- Argus wrasse (Halichoeres argus)
- Greenband wrasse (Halichoeres bathyphilus)
- Pearly-spotted wrasse (Halichoeres bicolor)
- Banded rainbow fish (Halichoeres binotopsis)
- Red-lined wrasse (Halichoeres biocellatus)
- Slippery dick (Halichoeres bivittatus)
- Brownfields wrasse (Halichoeres brownfieldi)
- Halichoeres caudalis
- Wounded wrasse (Halichoeres chierchiae)
- Halichoeres chlorocephalus
- Pastel-green wrasse (Halichoeres chloropterus)
- Canary wrasse (Halichoeres chrysus)
- Halichoeres claudia
- Adorned wrasse (Halichoeres cosmetus)
- Yellowcheek wrasse (Halichoeres cyanocephalus)
- Halichoeres dimidiatus
- Chameleon wrasse (Halichoeres dispilus)
- Yellowhead wrasse (Halichoeres garnoti)
- Hartzfeld's wrasse (Halichoeres hartzfeldii)
- Checkerboard wrasse (Halichoeres hortulanus)
- Halichoeres iridis
- Pink-snouted wrasse (Halichoeres kallochroma)
- Jewelled wrasse (Halichoeres lapillus)
- Thinstripe wrasse (Halichoeres leptotaenia)
- Canarytop wrasse (Halichoeres leucoxanthus)
- Chain-line wrasse (Halichoeres leucurus)
- Slippery okra (Halichoeres maculipinna)
- Pearl-spotted wrasse (Halichoeres margaritaceus)
- Dusky wrasse (Halichoeres marginatus)
- Orange-fin wrasse (Halichoeres melanochir)
- Halichoeres melanotis
- Tail-spot wrasse (Halichoeres melanurus)
- Cheekspot wrasse (Halichoeres melasmapomus)
- Cheek-ring wrasse (Halichoeres miniatus)
- Nebulous wrasse (Halichoeres nebulosus)
- Spinster wrasse (Halichoeres nicholsi)
- Bubblefin wrasse (Halichoeres nigrescens)
- Halichoeres notospilus
- Halichoeres orientalis
- Ornamented wrasse (Halichoeres ornatissimus)
- Babi wrasse (Halichoeres pallidus)
- Weed wrasse (Halichoeres papilionaceus)
- Halichoeres pardaleocephalus
- Halichoeres penrosei
- Halichoeres pictus
- Axil spot wrasse (Halichoeres podostigma)
- Halichoeres poeyi
- Half-grey wrasse (Halichoeres prosopeion)
- Puddingwife wrasse (Halichoeres radiatus)
- Richmond's wrasse (Halichoeres richmondi)
- Brownbanded wrasse (Halichoeres scapularis)
- Rock wrasse (Halichoeres semicinctus)
- Solor wrasse (Halichoeres solorensis)
- U-spot wrasse (Halichoeres stigmaticus)
- Chinese wrasse (Halichoeres tenuispinis)
- Timor wrasse (Halichoeres timorensis)
- Halichoeres trimaculatus
- Triplespot wrasse (Halichoeres trispilus)
- Indian Ocean pinstriped wrasse (Halichoeres vrolikii)
- Ceylon wrasse (Halichoeres zeylonicus)
- Barred thicklip (Hemigymnus fasciatus)
- Blackedge thicklip wrasse (Hemigymnus melapterus)
- Rainbow cale (Heteroscarus acroptilus)
- Candelamoa parrotfish (Hipposcarus harid)
- Pacific longnose parrotfish (Hipposcarus longiceps)
- Narrow-banded rainbowfish (Hologymnosus annulatus)
- Candy cane wrasse (Hologymnosus doliatus)
- Pale slender wrasse (Hologymnosus longipes)
- Redback longface wrasse (Hologymnosus rhodonotus)
- Pale razorfish (Iniistius aneitensis)
- Iniistius auropunctatus
- Baldwin's razorfish (Iniistius baldwini)
- Two-spot razorfish (Iniistius bimaculatus)
- Bronzespot razorfish (Iniistius celebicus)
- Blackspot razorfish (Iniistius dea)
- Iniistius evides
- Griffiths' razor fish (Iniistius griffithsi)
- Keel-head (Iniistius jacksonensis)
- Fin-spot razor wrasse (Iniistius melanopus)
- Black-barred razorfish (Iniistius pavo)
- Fivefinger razorfish (Iniistius pentadactylus)
- Iniistius twistii
- Blackside razorfish (Iniistius umbrilatus)
- Iniistius verrens
- Tubelip wrasse (Labrichthys unilineatus)
- Bicolor cleanerfish (Labroides bicolor)
- Bluestreak cleaner wrasse (Labroides dimidiatus)
- Black-spot cleaner wrasse (Labroides pectoralis)
- Hawaiian cleaner wrasse (Labroides phthirophagus)
- Golden cleanerwrasse (Labroides rubrolabiatus)
- Allen's tubelip (Labropsis alleni)
- Southern tubelip (Labropsis australis)
- Northern tubelip (Labropsis manabei)
- Micronesian wrasse (Labropsis micronesica)
- Labropsis polynesica
- Blacklobe wrasse (Labropsis xanthonota)
- Ballan wrasse (Labrus bergylta)
- Brown wrasse (Labrus merula)
- Cuckoo wrasse (Labrus mixtus)
- Iris wrasse (Lappanella fasciata)
- Ocre-band wrasse (Leptojulis chrysotaenia)
- Blue-spot V-wrasse (Leptojulis cyanopleura)
- Black-spot V-wrasse (Leptojulis polylepis)
- Tail-spot V-wrasse (Leptojulis urostigma)
- Marbled parrotfish (Leptoscarus vaigiensis)
- Divided wrasse (Macropharyngodon bipartitus)
- Choat’s wrasse (Macropharyngodon choati)
- Macropharyngodon cyanoguttatus
- Geoffroy's wrasse (Macropharyngodon geoffroy)
- Kuiter's wrasse (Macropharyngodon kuiteri)
- Guinea fowl wrasse (Macropharyngodon meleagris)
- Macropharyngodon moyeri
- Negros wrasse (Macropharyngodon negrosensis)
- False leopard (Macropharyngodon ornatus)
- Madagascar wrasse (Macropharyngodon vivienae)
- Minute wrasse (Minilabrus striatus)
- Tristan rainbow wrasse (Nelabrichthys ornatus)
- Little weed whiting (Neoodax balteatus)
- Nicholsina collettei
- Loosetooth parrotfish (Nicholsina denticulata)
- Emerald parrotfish (Nicholsina usta)
- Spotty (Notolabrus celidotus)
- Girdled wrasse (Notolabrus cinctus)
- Banded parrotfish (Notolabrus fucicola)
- Crimson banded wrasse (Notolabrus gymnogenis)
- Inscribed wrasse (Notolabrus inscriptus)
- Brown spotted wrasse (Notolabrus parilus)
- Blue-throated parrotfish (Notolabrus tetricus)
- Green-banner wrasse (Novaculichthys macrolepidotus)
- Dragon wrasse (Novaculichthys taeniourus)
- Bluefinned butterfish (Odax cyanoallix)
- Greenbone (Odax pullus)
- Herring cale (Olisthops cyanomelas)
- Butcher's prick (Ophthalmolepis lineolata)
- Arenatus wrasse (Oxycheilinus arenatus)
- Comettailed wrasse (Oxycheilinus bimaculatus)
- Celebes Maori wrasse (Oxycheilinus celebicus)
- Cheek-lined wrasse (Oxycheilinus digramma)
- Oxycheilinus lineatus
- Mental wrasse (Oxycheilinus mentalis)
- Oriental Maori wrasse (Oxycheilinus orientalis)
- Ringtail Maori wrasse (Oxycheilinus unifasciatus)
- Oxyjulis californica
- Angular flasher (Paracheilinus angulatus)
- Paracheilinus attenuatus
- Bell's flasher (Paracheilinus bellae)
- Blue flasher-wrasse (Paracheilinus cyaneus)
- Filamented flasher (Paracheilinus filamentosus)
- Yellow-fin flasher-wrasse (Paracheilinus flavianalis)
- Paracheilinus hemitaeniatus
- Spot-lined flasher (Paracheilinus lineopunctatus)
- McCosker's flasher wrasse (Paracheilinus mccoskeri)
- Paracheilinus nursalim
- Red sea eightline flasher (Paracheilinus octotaenia)
- Paracheilinus piscilineatus
- Paracheilinus rubricaudalis
- Togean flasher wrasse (Paracheilinus togeanensis)
- Paracheilinus walton
- Multicolorfin rainbowfish (Parajulis poecilepterus)
- Patrician wrasse (Pictilabrus laticlavius)
- Green senator wrasse (Pictilabrus viridis)
- Yellowstriped hogfish (Polylepion russelli)
- Pelvic-spot wrasse (Pseudocheilinops ataenia)
- Pseudocheilinus citrinus
- Striated wrasse (Pseudocheilinus evanidus)
- Six-line wrasse (Pseudocheilinus hexataenia)
- White-barred wrasse (Pseudocheilinus ocellatus)
- Eight-lined wrasse (Pseudocheilinus octotaenia)
- Four-lined wrasse (Pseudocheilinus tetrataenia)
- Rust-banded wrasse (Pseudocoris aurantiofasciata)
- Philippine wrasse (Pseudocoris bleekeri)
- Torpedo wrasse (Pseudocoris heteroptera)
- Yamashiro's wrasse (Pseudocoris yamashiroi)
- Chiseltooth wrasse (Pseudodax moluccanus)
- Ring-cheek slender wrasse (Pseudojuloides argyreogaster)
- Blue-head slender-wrasse (Pseudojuloides erythrops)
- Blue-nose wrasse (Pseudojuloides kaleidos)
- Black-patch wrasse (Pseudojuloides mesostigma)
- Fiery slender wrasse (Pseudojuloides pyrius)
- Black-hat slender wrasse (Pseudojuloides severnsi)
- Redband wrasse (Pseudolabrus biserialis)
- Red naped wrasse (Pseudolabrus eoethinus)
- Pseudolabrus fuentesi
- Pseudolabrus gayi
- Günther's wrasse (Pseudolabrus guentheri)
- Orange wrasse (Pseudolabrus luculentus)
- Scarlet wrasse (Pseudolabrus miles)
- Rosy parrotfish (Pseudolabrus mortonii)
- Pseudolabrus semifasciatus
- Pseudolabrus sieboldi
- Pseudolabrus torotai
- Cryptic wrasse (Pteragogus cryptus)
- Cockerel wrasse (Pteragogus enneacanthus)
- Cocktail fish (Pteragogus flagellifer)
- White-barred sneaky-wrasse (Pteragogus guttatus)
- Sideburn wrasse (Pteragogus pelycus)
- Cheekbar wrasse (Pteragogus taeniops)
- Filament-finned parrotfish (Scarus altipinnis)
- Arabian parrotfish (Scarus arabicus)
- Redbarred parrotfish (Scarus caudofasciatus)
- Chameleon parrotfish (Scarus chameleon)
- Blue parrotfish (Scarus coeruleus)
- Red sea parrotfish (Scarus collana)
- Azure parrotfish (Scarus compressus)
- Turquoise-capped parrotfish (Scarus dimidiatus)
- Regal parrotfish (Scarus dubius)
- Sicklefin parrotfish (Scarus falcipinnis)
- Rusty parrotfish (Scarus ferrugineus)
- Festive parrotfish (Scarus festivus)
- Yellowfin parrotfish (Scarus flavipectoralis)
- Forsten's parrotfish (Scarus forsteni)
- Bridled parrotfish (Scarus frenatus)
- Darktail parrotfish (Scarus fuscocaudalis)
- Purple-brown parrotfish (Scarus fuscopurpureus)
- Blue-barred parrotfish (Scarus ghobban)
- Globehead parrotfish (Scarus globiceps)
- Guinean parrotfish (Scarus hoefleri)
- Mottlefin parrotfish (Scarus iseri)
- Marquesan parrotfish (Scarus koputea)
- Highfin parrotfish (Scarus longipinnis)
- Swarthy parrotfish (Scarus niger)
- Dark-capped parrotfish (Scarus oviceps)
- Scarus perrico
- Gulf parrotfish (Scarus persicus)
- Singapore parrotfish (Scarus prasiognathos)
- Common parrotfish (Scarus psittacus)
- Blue banded parrotfish (Scarus pyrrostethus)
- Quoy's parrotfish (Scarus quoyi)
- Rivulated parrotfish (Scarus rivulatus)
- Ember parrotfish (Scarus rubroviolaceus)
- Eclipse parrotfish (Scarus russelii)
- Five-saddle parrotfish (Scarus scaber)
- Yellowband parrotfish (Scarus schlegeli)
- Spiny parrotfish (Scarus spinus)
- Princess parrotfish (Scarus taeniopterus)
- Tricolour parrotfish (Scarus tricolor)
- Queen parrotfish (Scarus vetula)
- Greenlip parrotfish (Scarus viridifucatus)
- Red parrotfish (Scarus xanthopleura)
- Tubemouth (Siphonognathus argyrophanes)
- Slender weed whiting (Siphonognathus attenuatus)
- Pencil weed whiting (Siphonognathus beddomei)
- Sharpnose weed whiting (Siphonognathus caninis)
- Long-rayed weed whiting (Siphonognathus radiatus)
- Reef parrotfish (Sparisoma amplum)
- Greenblotch parrotfish (Sparisoma atomarium)
- Redband parrotfish (Sparisoma aurofrenatum)
- Redtail parrotfish (Sparisoma chrysopterum)
- Sparisoma cretense
- Sparisoma radians
- Redfin parrotfish (Sparisoma rubripinne)
- Strigate parrotfish (Sparisoma strigatum)
- Sparisoma tuiupiranga
- Stoplight parrotfish (Sparisoma viride)
- Stethojulis albovittata
- Belted wrasse (Stethojulis balteata)
- Orange-axil wrasse (Stethojulis bandanensis)
- Cut-ribbon wrasse (Stethojulis interrupta)
- Stethojulis maculata
- Stethojulis marquesensis
- Stethojulis notialis
- Silver-streaked rainbowfish (Stethojulis strigiventer)
- Stethojulis terina
- Blue-ribbon wrasse (Stethojulis trilineata)
- Rainbow slender wrasse (Suezichthys arquatus)
- Crimson cleaner fish (Suezichthys aylingi)
- Red sea slender wrasse (Suezichthys caudavittatus)
- Blue-throated rainbow wrasse (Suezichthys cyanolaemus)
- Australian slender wrasse (Suezichthys devisi)
- Slender wrasse (Suezichthys gracilis)
- Japanese rainbow wrasse (Suezichthys notatus)
- Soela trawl wrasse (Suezichthys soelae)
- Baillon's wrasse (Symphodus bailloni)
- Symphodus caeruleus
- Grey wrasse (Symphodus cinereus)
- Symphodus doderleini
- Axillary wrasse (Symphodus mediterraneus)
- Blacktailed wrasse (Symphodus melanocercus)
- Corkwing wrasse (Symphodus melops)
- Ocellated wrasse (Symphodus ocellatus)
- Five-spotted wrasse (Symphodus roissali)
- Pointed-snout wrasse (Symphodus rostratus)
- East Atlantic peacock wrasse (Symphodus tinca)
- Symphodus trutta
- Bergall (Tautogolabrus adspersus)
- Yellow-stripe hogfish (Terelabrus rubrovittatus)
- Bluntheaded wrasse (Thalassoma amblycephalum)
- Blacktail wrasse (Thalassoma ballieui)
- Bluehead wrasse (Thalassoma bifasciatum)
- Cupid wrasse (Thalassoma cupido)
- Saddle wrasse (Thalassoma duperrey)
- Red-cheek wrasse (Thalassoma genivittatum)
- Sunset wrasse (Thalassoma grammaticum)
- Sixbar wrasse (Thalassoma hardwicke)
- Goldbar wrasse (Thalassoma hebraicum)
- Pitcairn rainbow wrasse (Thalassoma heiseri)
- Jansen's wrasse (Thalassoma jansenii)
- Cortez rainbow wrasse (Thalassoma lucasanum)
- Moon wrasse (Thalassoma lunare)
- Yellow-brown wrasse (Thalassoma lutescens)
- Newton's wrasse (Thalassoma newtoni)
- Black-barred wrasse (Thalassoma nigrofasciatum)
- Noronha wrasse (Thalassoma noronhanum)
- Ornate wrasse (Thalassoma pavo)
- Surge wrasse (Thalassoma purpureum)
- Fivestripe wrasse (Thalassoma quinquevittatum)
- Klunzinger's wrasse (Thalassoma rueppellii)
- Christmas wrasse (Thalassoma trilobatum)
- Diagonal-lined wrasse (Wetmorella albofasciata)
- Blackspot pigmy wrasse (Wetmorella nigropinnata)
- Finspot wrasse (Xenojulis margaritaceus)
- Blue-banded wrasse (Xiphocheilus typus)
- Marmalade razorfish (Xyrichtys blanchardi)
- Halstead's razorfish (Xyrichtys halsteadi)
- Xyrichtys incandescens
- Rosy razorfish (Xyrichtys martinicensis)
- Cape razorfish (Xyrichtys mundiceps)
- Pearly razorfish (Xyrichtys novacula)
- Pastel razorfish (Xyrichtys pastellus)
- Sand greenfish (Xyrichtys sanctaehelenae)
- Green razorfish (Xyrichtys splendens)
- Wood's razorfish (Xyrichtys woodi)

== Threefin blennies ==
- Acanthanectes hystrix
- Acanthanectes rufus
- Tasseled triplefin (Apopterygion alta)
- Ocellate triplefin (Apopterygion oculus)
- Panama triplefin (Axoclinus lucillae)
- Cortez triplefin (Axoclinus nigricaudus)
- Carmine triplefin (Axoclinus storeyae)
- Mottled twister (Bellapiscis lesleyae)
- Twister (Bellapiscis medius)
- Giant triplefin (Blennodon dorsale)
- Southern barred triplefin (Brachynectes fasciatus)
- Spotted spiny-eye triplefin (Ceratobregma acanthops)
- Striped spiny-eye triplefin (Ceratobregma helenae)
- Cape triplefin (Cremnochorites capensis)
- Lizard triplefin (Crocodilichthys gracilis)
- Cryptic triplefin (Cryptichthys jojettae)
- Lofty triplefin (Enneanectes altivelis)
- Blackedge triplefin (Enneanectes atrorus)
- Enneanectes boehlkei
- Delicate triplefin (Enneanectes carminalis)
- Two-bar triplefin (Enneanectes deloachorum)
- Mimic triplefin (Enneanectes jordani)
- Matador triplefin (Enneanectes matador)
- Redeye blenny (Enneanectes pectoralis)
- Network triplefin (Enneanectes reticulatus)
- Yellow triplefin (Enneapterygius abeli)
- Highfin triplefin (Enneapterygius altipinnis)
- Hawaiian blackhead triplefin (Enneapterygius atriceps)
- Blackthroat triplefin (Enneapterygius atrogulare)
- Enneapterygius bahasa
- Enneapterygius cheni
- Barred triplefin (Enneapterygius clarkae)
- Clea's triplefin (Enneapterygius clea)
- Enneapterygius destai
- Enneapterygius elaine
- Hourglass triplefin (Enneapterygius elegans)
- Enneapterygius etheostoma
- Tiny threefin (Enneapterygius fasciatus)
- Yellownape triplefin (Enneapterygius flavoccipitis)
- Blackbelly triplefin (Enneapterygius fuscoventer)
- Enneapterygius genamaculatus
- Northern yellow-black triplefin (Enneapterygius gracilis)
- Enneapterygius gruschkai
- Halfblack triplefin (Enneapterygius hemimelas)
- Holleman's triplefin (Enneapterygius hollemani)
- Lord Howe Island triplefin (Enneapterygius howensis)
- Enneapterygius hsiojenae
- Kermadec triplefin (Enneapterygius kermadecensis)
- Enneapterygius kosiensis
- Western Australian black-head triplefin (Enneapterygius larsonae)
- Enneapterygius melanospilus
- Minute triplefin (Enneapterygius minutus)
- Miracle triplefin (Enneapterygius mirabilis)
- Izu Islands triplefin (Enneapterygius miyakensis)
- Pygmy triplefin (Enneapterygius nanus)
- Black triplefin (Enneapterygius niger)
- Pacific blacktail triplefin (Enneapterygius nigricauda)
- Enneapterygius obscurus
- Henderson triplefin (Enneapterygius ornatus)
- Pale white-spotted triplefin (Enneapterygius pallidoserialis)
- Enneapterygius pallidus
- New Caledonian striped triplefin (Enneapterygius paucifasciatus)
- Enneapterygius philippinus
- Highcrest triplefin (Enneapterygius pusillus)
- Pyramid triplefin (Enneapterygius pyramis)
- Enneapterygius qirmiz
- Rapa triplefin (Enneapterygius randalli)
- Umpire triplefin (Enneapterygius rhabdotus)
- Surf triplefin (Enneapterygius rhothion)
- Redtail triplefin (Enneapterygius rubicauda)
- Redcap triplefin (Enneapterygius rufopileus)
- Enneapterygius senoui
- Enneapterygius shaoi
- Flagtail triplefin (Enneapterygius signicauda)
- Black-and-red triplefin (Enneapterygius similis)
- White-spotted triplefin (Enneapterygius triserialis)
- Enneapterygius trisignatus
- High-hat triplefin (Enneapterygius tutuilae)
- Onespot triplefin (Enneapterygius unimaculatus)
- Blotched triplefin (Enneapterygius ventermaculus)
- Blacksaddle triplefin (Enneapterygius vexillarius)
- William's triplefin (Enneapterygius williamsi)
- Ziegler's triplefin (Enneapterygius ziegleri)
- Spotted robust triplefin (Forsterygion capito)
- Yellow-and-black triplefin (Forsterygion flavonigrum)
- Tasmanian robust triplefin (Forsterygion gymnota)
- Common triplefin (Forsterygion lapillum)
- Mottled triplefin (Forsterygion malcolmi)
- Oblique-swimming triplefin (Forsterygion maryannae)
- Estuarine triplefin (Forsterygion nigripenne)
- Variable triplefin (Forsterygion varium)
- Obscure triplefin (Gilloblennius abditus)
- Thripenny (Gilloblennius tripennis)
- Helcogramma albimacula
- Helcogramma alkamr
- Helcogramma aquila
- Helcogramma ascensionis
- Helcogramma billi
- Hooded triplefin (Helcogramma capidata)
- Helcogramma cerasina
- Little hooded triplefin (Helcogramma chica)
- Black-throated triplefin (Helcogramma decurrens)
- Helcogramma desa
- Red-eye threefin (Helcogramma ellioti)
- Helcogramma ememes
- Fourspot triplefin (Helcogramma fuscipectoris)
- Blackfin triplefin (Helcogramma fuscopinna)
- Red-finned triplefin (Helcogramma gymnauchen)
- Hudson's triplefin (Helcogramma hudsoni)
- Triangle triplefin (Helcogramma inclinata)
- Helmet triplefin (Helcogramma kranos)
- Helcogramma lacuna
- Helcogramma microstigma
- Helcogramma nesion
- Helcogramma nigra
- New Caledonian triplefin (Helcogramma novaecaledoniae)
- Shortsnout triplefin (Helcogramma obtusirostris)
- Helcogramma randalli
- Helcogramma rharhabe
- Rhinocerus triplefin (Helcogramma rhinoceros)
- Helcogramma rosea
- Helcogramma serendip
- Springer's triplefin (Helcogramma springeri)
- Red triplefin (Helcogramma steinitzi)
- Tropical striped triplefin (Helcogramma striata)
- Helcogramma trigloides
- Helcogramma vulcana
- Helcogrammoides chilensis
- Cunningham's triplefin (Helcogrammoides cunninghami)
- Scaly-headed triplefin (Karalepis stewarti)
- Eastern jumping blenny (Lepidoblennius haplodactylus)
- Western jumping blenny (Lepidoblennius marmoratus)
- Signal triplefin (Lepidonectes clarkhubbsi)
- Chatham deep-water triplefin (Matanui bathytaton)
- Deepwater triplefin (Matanui profundum)
- Tropical scaly-headed triplefin (Norfolkia brachylepis)
- Leeuwin triplefin (Norfolkia leeuwin)
- Scalyhead triplefin (Norfolkia squamiceps)
- Thomas' triplefin (Norfolkia thomasi)
- Blue dot triplefin (Notoclinops caerulepunctus)
- Blue-eyed triplefin (Notoclinops segmentatus)
- Yaldwyn's triplefin (Notoclinops yaldwyni)
- Brown topknot (Notoclinus compressus)
- New Zealand topknot (Notoclinus fenestratus)
- Longfinned triplefin (Ruanoho decemdigitatus)
- Spectacled triplefin (Ruanoho whero)
- Japanese blacktail triplefin (Springerichthys bapturus)
- Kulbicki's triplefin (Springerichthys kulbickii)
- Bullhead triplefin (Trianectes bucephalus)
- Clarke's triplefin (Trinorfolkia clarkei)
- Crested triplefin (Trinorfolkia cristata)
- Notched triplefin (Trinorfolkia incisa)
- Black-faced blenny (Tripterygion delaisi)
- Tripterygion melanurum
- Tripterygion tartessicum
- Red-black triplefin (Tripterygion tripteronotum)
- Largemouth triplefin (Ucla xenogrammus)

== Pomacanthids ==
- Banded angelfish (Apolemichthys arcuatus)
- Griffis angelfish (Apolemichthys griffisi)
- Tiger angelfish (Apolemichthys kingi)
- Threespot angelfish (Apolemichthys trimaculatus)
- Goldspotted angelfish (Apolemichthys xanthopunctatus)
- Yellow-ear angelfish (Apolemichthys xanthotis)
- Indian yellowtail angelfish (Apolemichthys xanthurus)
- Centropyge abei
- Orangeback angelfish (Centropyge acanthops)
- Cherubfish (Centropyge argi)
- Golden angelfish (Centropyge aurantia)
- Flameback angelfish (Centropyge aurantonotus)
- Bicolor angelfish (Centropyge bicolor)
- Twospined angelfish (Centropyge bispinosa)
- Peppermint angelfish (Centropyge boylei)
- Cocos-Keeling angelfish (Centropyge colini)
- Blue Mauritius angelfish (Centropyge debelius)
- Blacktail angelfish (Centropyge eibli)
- Rusty angelfish (Centropyge ferrugata)
- Fisher's angelfish (Centropyge fisheri)
- Yellowfin angelfish (Centropyge flavipectoralis)
- Lemonpeel angelfish (Centropyge flavissima)
- Herald's angelfish (Centropyge heraldi)
- Blackear angelfish (Centropyge hotumatua)
- Japanese angelfish (Centropyge interruptus)
- Yellowhead angelfish (Centropyge joculator)
- Flame angelfish (Centropyge loricula)
- Multicolor angelfish (Centropyge multicolor)
- Bluefin dwarf (Centropyge multispinis)
- Narc angelfish (Centropyge narcosis)
- Black-spot pygmy angelfish (Centropyge nigriocellus)
- Midnight angelfish (Centropyge nox)
- Russet angelfish (Centropyge potteri)
- Resplendent pygmy angelfish (Centropyge resplendens)
- Mango angelfish (Centropyge shepardi)
- Black angelfish (Centropyge tibicen)
- Purplemask angelfish (Centropyge venusta)
- Pearlscale angelfish (Centropyge vrolikii)
- Ballina angelfish (Chaetodontoplus ballinae)
- Orangeface angelfish (Chaetodontoplus chrysocephalus)
- Conspicuous angelfish (Chaetodontoplus conspicillatus)
- Velvet angelfish (Chaetodontoplus dimidiatus)
- Chaetodontoplus duboulayi
- Black-velvet angelfish (Chaetodontoplus melanosoma)
- Queensland yellowtail angelfish (Chaetodontoplus meredithi)
- Vermiculate angelfish (Chaetodontoplus mesoleucus)
- Chaetodontoplus niger
- Spottedface angelfish (Chaetodontoplus personifer)
- Chaetodontoplus poliourus
- Bluestriped angelfish (Chaetodontoplus septentrionalis)
- Ornate angelfish (Genicanthus bellus)
- Zebra angelfish (Genicanthus caudovittatus)
- Blackstriped angelfish (Genicanthus lamarck)
- Spotbreast angelfish (Genicanthus melanospilos)
- Masked angelfish (Genicanthus personatus)
- Halfbanded angelfish (Genicanthus semicinctus)
- Japanese swallow (Genicanthus semifasciatus)
- Pitcairn angelfish (Genicanthus spinus)
- Genicanthus takeuchii
- Blackedged angelfish (Genicanthus watanabei)
- Guinean angelfish (Holacanthus africanus)
- Bermuda blue angelfish (Holacanthus bermudensis)
- Queen angelfish (Holacanthus ciliaris)
- King angelfish (Holacanthus passer)
- Rock beauty (Holacanthus tricolor)
- Barred angelfish (Paracentropyge multifasciata)
- Blue ring angelfish (Pomacanthus annularis)
- Gray angelfish (Pomacanthus arcuatus)
- Arabian angelfish (Pomacanthus asfur)
- Goldtail angelfish (Pomacanthus chrysurus)
- Emperor angelfish (Pomacanthus imperator)
- Yellowbar angelfish (Pomacanthus maculosus)
- Bluegirdled angelfish (Pomacanthus navarchus)
- French angelfish (Pomacanthus paru)
- Old woman angelfish (Pomacanthus rhomboides)
- Semicircle angelfish (Pomacanthus semicirculatus)
- Sixbar angelfish (Pomacanthus sexstriatus)
- Blue-faced angelfish (Pomacanthus xanthometopon)
- Cortez angelfish (Pomacanthus zonipectus)
- Royal angelfish (Pygoplites diacanthus)

== Haemulids ==
- Silvergray grunt (Anisotremus caesius)
- Xantic sargo (Anisotremus davidsonii)
- Burito grunt (Anisotremus interruptus)
- Brownstriped grunt (Anisotremus moricandi)
- Anisotremus scapularis
- Panama porkfish (Anisotremus taeniatus)
- Porkfish (Anisotremus virginicus)
- Lemoneye grunt (Conodon macrops)
- Barred grunt (Conodon nobilis)
- Armed grunt (Conodon serrifer)
- Bonnetmouth (Emmelichthyops atlanticus)
- Blackbarred grunt (Genyatremus dovii)
- Carruco grunt (Genyatremus pacifici)
- Tomtate (Haemulon aurolineatum)
- Haemulon bonariense
- Haemulon boschmae
- Caesar grunt (Haemulon carbonarium)
- Smallmouth grunt (Haemulon chrysargyreum)
- Cortez grunt (Haemulon flaviguttatum)
- Haemulon flavolineatum
- Spanish grunt (Haemulon macrostomum)
- Spottail grunt (Haemulon maculicauda)
- Cottonwick (Haemulon melanurum)
- Haemulon parra
- Jolle cocoon (Haemulon plumierii)
- Blue striped grunt (Haemulon sciurus)
- Mojarra grunt (Haemulon scudderii)
- Graybar grunt (Haemulon sexfasciatum)
- Latin grunt (Haemulon steindachneri)
- Striped grunt (Haemulon striatum)
- Boga (Haemulon vittatum)
- Axil grunt (Haemulopsis axillaris)
- Roughneck grunt (Haemulopsis corvinaeformis)
- Elongate grunt (Haemulopsis elongatus)
- Raucous grunt (Haemulopsis leuciscus)
- Shining grunt (Haemulopsis nitidus)
- Cabinza grunt (Isacia conceptionis)
- Shortfin grunt (Microlepidotus brevipinnis)
- Wavyline grunt (Microlepidotus inornatus)
- Orthopristis chalceus
- Orthopristis chrysoptera
- Orthopristis reddingi
- Corocoro grunt (Orthopristis ruber)
- Guinean grunt (Parapristipoma humile)
- African striped grunt (Parapristipoma octolineatum)
- Brown sweetlips (Plectorhinchus gibbosus)
- Biglip grunt (Plectorhinchus macrolepis)
- Pomadasys argenteus
- Sand grunt (Pomadasys branickii)
- Bastard grunt (Pomadasys incisus)
- Sompat grunt (Pomadasys jubelini)
- Longspine grunt (Pomadasys macracanthus)
- Saddle grunt (Pomadasys maculatus)
- Panama grunt (Pomadasys panamensis)
- Pomadasys perotaei
- Pigsnout grunt (Pomadasys rogerii)
- Longfin salema (Xenichthys xanti)
- Californian salema (Xenistius californiensis)

== Apogonids ==
- Blacktip cardinalfish (Apogon atradorsatus)
- Plain cardinalfish (Apogon atricaudus)
- Bridle cardinalfish (Apogon aurolineatus)
- Apogon axillaris
- Barred cardinalfish (Apogon binotatus)
- Ochre-striped cardinalfish (Apogon compressus)
- Tailspot cardinalfish (Apogon dovii)
- Flower cardinalfish (Apogon fleurieu)
- Deepwater cardinalfish (Apogon gouldi)
- Guadalupe cardinalfish (Apogon guadalupensis)
- Mangrove cardinalfish (Apogon hyalosoma)
- Mediterranean cardinalfish (Apogon imberbis)
- Apogon indicus
- Whitestar cardinalfish (Apogon lachneri)
- Slendertail cardinalfish (Apogon leptocaulus)
- Spotted cardinalfish (Apogon maculatus)
- Red-striped cardinalfish (Apogon margaritophorus)
- Dwarf cardinalfish (Apogon mosavi)
- Mini cardinalfish (Apogon neotes)
- Spotnape cardinalfish (Apogon notatus)
- Pink cardinalfish (Apogon pacificus)
- Mimic cardinalfish (Apogon phenax)
- Broadsaddle cardinalfish (Apogon pillionatus)
- Pale cardinalfish (Apogon planifrons)
- Twospot cardinalfish (Apogon pseudomaculatus)
- Apogon quadrisquamatus
- Barspot cardinalfish (Apogon retrosella)
- Striped cardinalfish (Apogon robbyi)
- Roughlip cardinalfish (Apogon robinsi)
- Orangespot cardinalfish (Apogon rubrimacula)
- Cheekbar cardinalfish (Apogon sealei)
- Belted cardinalfish (Apogon townsendi)
- Kupang cardinalfish (Apogon wassinki)
- Ocellated cardinalfish (Apogonichthys ocellatus)
- Bronze cardinalfish (Astrapogon alutus)
- Blackfin cardinalfish (Astrapogon puncticulatus)
- Truncate cardinalfish (Cheilodipterus singapurensis)
- Nectamia annularis
- Ghost cardinalfish (Nectamia fusca)
- Nectamia zebrinus
- Humpback cardinal (Ostorhinchus lateralis)
- Bigtooth cardinalfish (Paroncheilus affinis)
- Freckled cardinalfish (Phaeoptyx conklini)
- Dusky cardinalfish (Phaeoptyx pigmentaria)
- Sponge cardinalfish (Phaeoptyx xenus)
- Buru cardinalfish (Taeniamia buruensis)
- Cave cardinalfish (Zapogon evermanni)

== Ambassids ==
- Commerson's glassy perchlet (Ambassis ambassis)
- Malabar glassy perchlet (Ambassis dussumieri)
- Yellow-fin perchlet (Ambassis elongatus)
- Bald glassy perchlet (Ambassis gymnocephalus)
- Long-spined glassfish (Ambassis interrupta)
- Macleayi's glassfish (Ambassis macleayi)
- Estuary perchlet (Ambassis marianus)
- Flag-tailed glassfish (Ambassis miops)
- Scalloped perchlet (Ambassis nalua)
- Bleeker's glass perchlet (Ambassis urotaenia)
- Vachell's glassfish (Ambassis vachellii)
- Elongate glassy perchlet (Chanda nama)
- Parambassis apogonoides
- Day's glassy perchlet (Parambassis dayi)
- Parambassis ranga
- Parambassis siamensis
- Western ghat glassy perchlet (Parambassis thomassi)
- Parambassis vollmeri
- Parambassis wolffii
- Himalayan glassy perchlet (Pseudambassis baculis)
- Indian glass perch (Pseudambassis ranga)

== Carangids ==
Species

- African threadfish (Alectis alexandrina)
- African pompano (Alectis ciliaris)
- Herring scad (Alepes vari)
- Vadigo (Campogramma glaycos)
- Threadfin jack (Carangoides otrynter)
- Yellow jack (Caranx bartholomaei)
- Green jack (Caranx caballus)
- Pacific crevalle jack (Caranx caninus)
- Blue runner (Caranx crysos)
- Longfin crevalle jack (Caranx fischeri)
- Crevalle jack (Caranx hippos)
- Horse-eye jack (Caranx latus)
- Black jack (Caranx lugubris)
- False scad (Caranx rhonchus)
- Bar jack (Caranx ruber)
- Senegal jack (Caranx senegallus)
- Bigeye trevally (Caranx sexfasciatus)
- Cocinero (Caranx vinctus)
- Atlantic bumper (Chloroscombrus chrysurus)
- Pacific bumper (Chloroscombrus orqueta)
- Mackerel scad (Decapterus macarellus)
- Amberstripe scad (Decapterus muroadsi)
- Round scad (Decapterus punctatus)
- Indian scad (Decapterus russelli)
- Roughear scad (Decapterus tabl)
- Rainbow runner (Elagatis bipinnulata)
- Palomette (Hemicaranx amblyrhynchus)
- Hemicaranx bicolor
- Yellowfin jack (Hemicaranx leucurus)
- Blackfin jack (Hemicaranx zelotes)
- Leerfish (Lichia amia)
- Pilot fish (Naucrates ductor)
- Longjaw leatherjacket (Oligoplites altus)
- Maracaibo leatherjacket (Oligoplites palometa)
- Shortjaw leatherjack (Oligoplites refulgens)
- Castin leatherjacket (Oligoplites saliens)
- Leatherjacket fish (Oligoplites saurus)
- White trevally (Pseudocaranx dentex)
- Bigeye scad (Selar crumenophthalmus)
- Mexican lookdown (Selene brevoortii)
- Full moonfish (Selene brownii)
- Bluntnose (Selene dorsalis)
- Mexican moonfish (Selene orstedii)
- Pacific moonfish (Selene peruviana)
- Atlantic moonfish (Selene setapinnis)
- Lookdown (Selene vomer)
- Guinean amberjack (Seriola carpenteri)
- Greater amberjack (Seriola dumerili)
- Lesser amberjack (Seriola fasciata)
- California yellowtail (Seriola lalandi)
- Darkfin amberjack (Seriola peruana)
- Almaco jack (Seriola rivoliana)
- Banded rudderfish (Seriola zonata)
- Florida pompano (Trachinotus carolinus)
- Cayenne pompano (Trachinotus cayennensis)
- Permit (Trachinotus falcatus)
- Streamers jack (Trachinotus goodei)
- Trachinotus goreensis
- Blackblotch pompano (Trachinotus kennedyi)
- Trachinotus maxillosus
- Short dorsal fin pompano (Trachinotus ovatus)
- Paloma pompano (Trachinotus paitensis)
- Gafftopsail pompano (Trachinotus rhodopus)
- Steel pompano (Trachinotus stilbe)
- Trachinotus teraia
- Rough scad (Trachurus lathami)
- Mediterranean horse mackerel (Trachurus mediterraneus)
- Blue jack mackerel (Trachurus picturatus)
- Pacific jack mackerel (Trachurus symmetricus)
- Cunene horse mackerel (Trachurus trecae)
- Whitetongue jack (Uraspis helvola)
- Cottonmouth jack (Uraspis secunda)

Subspecies

- Leathercoat (Oligoplites saurus inornatus)
- Atlantic leatherjacket (Oligoplites saurus saurus)

== Acanthurids ==
- Achilles tang (Acanthurus achilles)
- Whitefin surgeonfish (Acanthurus albipectoralis)
- Orange-socket surgeonfish (Acanthurus auranticavus)
- Ocean surgeon (Acanthurus bahianus)
- Roundspot surgeonfish (Acanthurus bariene)
- Ringtail surgeonfish (Acanthurus blochii)
- Doctorfish tang (Acanthurus chirurgus)
- Blue doctorfish (Acanthurus coeruleus)
- Eyestripe surgeonfish (Acanthurus dussumieri)
- Horseshoe surgeonfish (Acanthurus fowleri)
- Acanthurus gahhm
- Finelined surgeonfish (Acanthurus grammoptilus)
- Whitespotted surgeonfish (Acanthurus guttatus)
- Japanese surgeonfish (Acanthurus japonicus)
- Palelipped surgeonfish (Acanthurus leucocheilus)
- Whitebar surgeonfish (Acanthurus leucopareius)
- Powder blue surgeonfish (Acanthurus leucosternon)
- Lined surgeonfish (Acanthurus lineatus)
- Spotted-face surgeonfish (Acanthurus maculiceps)
- Elongate surgeonfish (Acanthurus mata)
- Monrovia surgeonfish (Acanthurus monroviae)
- Whitecheek surgeonfish (Acanthurus nigricans)
- Blackstreak surgeonfish (Acanthurus nigricauda)
- Brown surgeonfish (Acanthurus nigrofuscus)
- Acanthurus nigroris
- Dropoff surgeonfish (Acanthurus nubilus)
- Orange band surgeonfish (Acanthurus olivaceus)
- Pacific mimic surgeon (Acanthurus pyroferus)
- Marquesan surgeonfish (Acanthurus reversus)
- Sohal surgeonfish (Acanthurus sohal)
- Doubleband surgeonfish (Acanthurus tennentii)
- Thompson's surgeonfish (Acanthurus thompsoni)
- Acanthurus tractus
- Convict surgeonfish (Acanthurus triostegus)
- Indian Ocean mimic surgeonfish (Acanthurus tristis)
- Yellowfin surgeonfish (Acanthurus xanthopterus)
- Two-spot bristletooth (Ctenochaetus binotatus)
- Short-tail bristle-tooth (Ctenochaetus cyanocheilus)
- Whitetail bristletooth (Ctenochaetus flavicauda)
- Hawaiian bristletooth (Ctenochaetus hawaiiensis)
- Blue-spotted bristletooth (Ctenochaetus marginatus)
- Striated surgeonfish (Ctenochaetus striatus)
- Goldring bristletooth (Ctenochaetus strigosus)
- Orange-tipped bristletooth (Ctenochaetus tominiensis)
- Squaretail bristletooth (Ctenochaetus truncatus)
- Whitemargin unicornfish (Naso annulatus)
- Humpback unicornfish (Naso brachycentron)
- Short-nosed unicornfish (Naso brevirostris)
- Bluetail unicornfish (Naso caeruleacauda)
- Gray unicornfish (Naso caesius)
- Elegant unicornfish (Naso elegans)
- Horseface unicornfish (Naso fageni)
- Sleek unicornfish (Naso hexacanthus)
- Orange spine surgeonfish (Naso lituratus)
- Slender unicornfish (Naso lopezi)
- Naso maculatus
- Squarenose unicornfish (Naso mcdadei)
- Blackspine unicornfish (Naso minor)
- Singlespine unicornfish (Naso thynnoides)
- Bulbnose unicornfish (Naso tonganus)
- Bluespine unicornfish (Naso unicornis)
- Bignose unicornfish (Naso vlamingii)
- Palette surgeonfish (Paracanthurus hepatus)
- Biafra sawtail (Prionurus biafraensis)
- Razor surgeonfish (Prionurus laticlavius)
- Yellowspotted sawtail (Prionurus maculatus)
- Sixplate sawtail (Prionurus microlepidotus)
- Prionurus punctatus
- Red Sea sailfin tang (Zebrasoma desjardinii)
- Yellow tang (Zebrasoma flavescens)
- Brushtail tang (Zebrasoma scopas)
- Sailfin tang (Zebrasoma veliferum)
- Purple Tang (Zebrasoma xanthurum)

== Butterflyfishes ==
- Lord Howe Island butterflyfish (Amphichaetodon howensis)
- Philippine butterflyfish (Chaetodon adiergastos)
- Asian butterflyfish (Chaetodon argentatus)
- Assarius butterflyfish (Chaetodon assarius)
- Goldenrod butterflyfish (Chaetodon aureofasciatus)
- Threadfin butterflyfish (Chaetodon auriga)
- Oriental butterflyfish (Chaetodon auripes)
- Blacktail butterflyfish (Chaetodon austriacus)
- Eastern triangle butterflyfish (Chaetodon baronessa)
- Blackburn's butterflyfish (Chaetodon blackburnii)
- Black-barred butterflyfish (Chaetodon burgessi)
- Foureye butterflyfish (Chaetodon capistratus)
- Speckled butterflyfish (Chaetodon citrinellus)
- Redtail butterflyfish (Chaetodon collare)
- Wrought iron butterflyfish (Chaetodon daedalma)
- Marquesan butterflyfish (Chaetodon declivis)
- Indian vagabond butterflyfish (Chaetodon decussatus)
- Oman butterflyfish (Chaetodon dialeucos)
- African butterflyfish (Chaetodon dolosus)
- Saddle butterflyfish (Chaetodon ephippium)
- Blackwedged butterflyfish (Chaetodon falcula)
- Diagonal butterflyfish (Chaetodon fasciatus)
- Black butterflyfish (Chaetodon flavirostris)
- Yellow-crowned butterflyfish (Chaetodon flavocoronatus)
- Bluestripe butterflyfish (Chaetodon fremblii)
- Gardiner's butterflyfish (Chaetodon gardineri)
- Crochet butterflyfish (Chaetodon guentheri)
- Peppered butterflyfish (Chaetodon guttatissimus)
- Four-banded butterflyfish (Chaetodon hoefleri)
- Chaetodon humeralis
- Yellow teardrop butterflyfish (Chaetodon interruptus)
- Sunburst butterflyfish (Chaetodon kleinii)
- Blue chevron butterflyfish (Chaetodon larvatus)
- Somali butterflyfish (Chaetodon leucopleura)
- Lined butterflyfish (Chaetodon lineolatus)
- Easter Island butterflyfish (Chaetodon litus)
- Raccoon butterflyfish (Chaetodon lunula)
- Oval butterflyfish (Chaetodon lunulatus)
- Seychelles butterflyfish (Chaetodon madagaskariensis)
- Marley's butterflyfish (Chaetodon marleyi)
- Blackback butterflyfish (Chaetodon melannotus)
- Arabian butterflyfish (Chaetodon melapterus)
- Atoll butterflyfish (Chaetodon mertensii)
- White-face butterflyfish (Chaetodon mesoleucos)
- Scrawled butterflyfish (Chaetodon meyeri)
- Millet butterflyfish (Chaetodon miliaris)
- Indian butterflyfish (Chaetodon mitratus)
- Pebbled butterflyfish (Chaetodon multicinctus)
- Black-spotted butterflyfish (Chaetodon nigropunctatus)
- Chaetodon nippon
- Spotfin butterflyfish (Chaetodon ocellatus)
- Eightband butterflyfish (Chaetodon octofasciatus)
- Ornate butterflyfish (Chaetodon ornatissimus)
- Spot-nape butterflyfish (Chaetodon oxycephalus)
- Eritrean butterflyfish (Chaetodon paucifasciatus)
- Dot-and-dash coralfish (Chaetodon pelewensis)
- Chaetodon pictus
- Blueblotch butterflyfish (Chaetodon plebeius)
- Spotband butterflyfish (Chaetodon punctatofasciatus)
- Fourspot butterflyfish (Chaetodon quadrimaculatus)
- Latticed butterflyfish (Chaetodon rafflesii)
- Three-banded butterflyfish (Chaetodon robustus)
- Cunningfish (Chaetodon sanctaehelenae)
- Reef butterflyfish (Chaetodon sedentarius)
- Yellow-dotted butterflyfish (Chaetodon selene)
- Dotted butterflyfish (Chaetodon semeion)
- Bluecheek butterflyfish (Chaetodon semilarvatus)
- Smith's butterflyfish (Chaetodon smithi)
- Mirror butterflyfish (Chaetodon speculum)
- Banded butterflyfish (Chaetodon striatus)
- Hawaiian butterflyfish (Chaetodon tinkeri)
- Herringbone butterflyfish (Chaetodon triangulum)
- Tahitian butterflyfish (Chaetodon trichrous)
- Three-striped butterflyfish (Chaetodon tricinctus)
- Melon butterflyfish (Chaetodon trifasciatus)
- Pacific double-saddle butterflyfish (Chaetodon ulietensis)
- Teardrop butterflyfish (Chaetodon unimaculatus)
- Vagabond butterflyfish (Chaetodon vagabundus)
- Hongkong butterflyfish (Chaetodon wiebeli)
- Yellowhead butterflyfish (Chaetodon xanthocephalus)
- Pearlscale butterflyfish (Chaetodon xanthurus)
- Zanzibar butterflyfish (Chaetodon zanzibarensis)
- Margined coralfish (Chelmon marginalis)
- Blackfin coralfish (Chelmon muelleri)
- Copperband butterflyfish (Chelmon rostratus)
- Western talma (Chelmonops curiosus)
- Coralfish (Chelmonops truncatus)
- High-fin butterflyfish (Coradion altivelis)
- Golden-girdled coralfish (Coradion chrysozonus)
- Twoeye coralfish (Coradion melanopus)
- Yellow longnose butterflyfish (Forcipiger flavissimus)
- Black long-nosed butterflyfish (Forcipiger longirostris)
- Many-spined butterflyfish (Hemitaurichthys multispinosus)
- Pyramid butterflyfish (Hemitaurichthys polylepis)
- Thompson's butterflyfish (Hemitaurichthys thompsoni)
- Black pyramid butterflyfish (Hemitaurichthys zoster)
- Pennant coralfish (Heniochus acuminatus)
- Horned coralfish (Heniochus chrysostomus)
- Schooling bannerfish (Heniochus diphreutes)
- Red Sea bannerfish (Heniochus intermedius)
- Masked bannerfish (Heniochus monoceros)
- Indian Ocean bannerfish (Heniochus pleurotaenia)
- Singular bannerfish (Heniochus singularius)
- Humphead bannerfish (Heniochus varius)
- Barberfish (Johnrandallia nigrirostris)
- Eye-spot butterflyfish (Parachaetodon ocellatus)
- Longsnout butterflyfish (Prognathodes aculeatus)
- Bank butterflyfish (Prognathodes aya)
- Prognathodes brasiliensis
- Bastard cunningfish (Prognathodes dichrous)
- Scythe butterflyfish (Prognathodes falcifer)
- Guyana butterflyfish (Prognathodes guyanensis)
- Prognathodes marcellae
- Roa australis
- Hawaiian gold-barred butterflyfish (Roa excelsa)
- Indian golden-barred butterflyfish (Roa jayakari)
- Brown-banded butterflyfish (Roa modestus)

== Sand lances ==
- Gill's sand lance (Ammodytoides gilli)
- Cape sandlance (Gymnammodytes capensis)
- Mediterranean sand eel (Gymnammodytes cicerelus)
- Gymnammodytes semisquamatus
- Great sand eel (Hyperoplus lanceolatus)

== Surfperches ==
- Calico surfperch (Amphistichus koelzi)
- Shiner perch (Cymatogaster aggregata)
- Tule perch (Hysterocarpus traskii)
- Pile perch (Rhacochilus vacca)
- Pink seaperch (Zalembius rosaceus)

== Trichiuridae ==
- Intermediate scabbardfish (Aphanopus intermedius)
- Mikhailin's scabbardfish (Aphanopus mikhailini)
- Benthodesmus tenuis
- Channel scabbardfish (Evoxymetopon taeniatus)
- Lepidopus dubius
- Largehead hairtail (Trichiurus lepturus)

== Stargazers ==
- Northern stargazer (Astroscopus guttatus)
- Brazilian stargazer (Astroscopus sexspinosus)
- Southern stargazer (Astroscopus y-graecum)
- Pacific stargazer (Astroscopus zephyreus)
- Spotted stargazer (Genyagnus monopterygius)
- Lancer stargazer (Kathetostoma albigutta)
- Smooth stargazer (Kathetostoma averruncus)
- Longspine stargazer (Uranoscopus albesca)
- West African stargazer (Uranoscopus cadenati)
- Japanese stargazer (Uranoscopus japonicus)
- Drab nackednape stargazer (Uranoscopus oligolepis)
- Whitespotted stargazer (Uranoscopus polli)
- Atlantic stargazer (Uranoscopus scaber)
- Freckled stargazer (Xenocephalus egregius)

== Ponyfishes ==
- Threadfin ponyfish (Aurigequula fasciata)
- Splendid ponyfish (Eubleekeria splendens)
- Smalltoothed ponyfish (Gazza achlamys)
- Toothed ponyfish (Gazza minuta)
- Common ponyfish (Leiognathus equulus)
- Haneda's ponyfish (Secutor hanedai)

== Percophids ==
- Duckbill flathead (Bembrops anatirostris)
- Bembrops cadenati
- Goby flathead (Bembrops gobioides)
- Bembrops greyi
- Bembrops heterurus
- Scaled-eye duckbill (Bembrops macromma)
- Opalfish (Hemerocoetes monopterygius)

== Pomfrets ==
- Atlantic pomfret (Brama brama)
- Lesser bream (Brama dussumieri)
- Pacific fanfish (Pteraclis aesticola)
- Atlantic fanfish (Pterycombus brama)
- Black pomfret (Taractes rubescens)
- Big-scale pomfret (Taractichthys longipinnis)

== Centracanthids ==
- Curled picarel (Centracanthus cirrus)
- Bigeye picarel (Spicara alta)
- Spicara australis
- Spicara axillaris
- Blotched picarel (Spicara maena)
- Blackspot picarel (Spicara melanurus)
- Blacktail picarel (Spicara nigricauda)
- Deep-body pickarel (Spicara smaris)

== Centrolophidae ==
- Black ruff (Centrolophus niger)
- Black driftfish (Hyperoglyphe bythites)
- Barrelfish (Hyperoglyphe perciformis)
- Japanese butterfish (Psenopsis anomala)
- Mocosa ruff (Schedophilus haedrichi)
- New Zealand ruffe (Schedophilus huttoni)
- Pemarco blackfish (Schedophilus pemarco)
- Schedophilus velaini
- White warehou (Seriolella caerulea)
- Palm ruff (Seriolella violacea)

== Centropomids ==
- Armed snook (Centropomus armatus)
- Swordspine snook (Centropomus ensiferus)
- Blackfin snook (Centropomus medius)
- Largescale fat snook (Centropomus mexicanus)
- Black robalo (Centropomus nigrescens)
- Fat snook (Centropomus parallelus)
- Tarpon snook (Centropomus pectinatus)
- Yellowfin snook (Centropomus robalito)
- Common snook (Centropomus undecimalis)
- Humpback snook (Centropomus unionensis)
- White snook (Centropomus viridis)

== Ephippids ==
- Atlantic spadefish (Chaetodipterus faber)
- West African spadefish (Chaetodipterus lippei)
- Pacific spadefish (Chaetodipterus zonatus)
- African spadefish (Ephippus goreensis)
- Panama spadefish (Parapsettus panamensis)

== Chiasmodontids ==
- Chiasmodon braueri
- Black swallower (Chiasmodon niger)
- Chiasmodon subniger
- Dysalotus alcocki
- Dysalotus oligoscolus
- Kali indica
- Kali kerberti
- Kali macrodon
- Kali macrura
- Kali parri
- Pseudoscopelus altipinnis
- Pseudoscopelus scriptus
- Pseudoscopelus scutatus

== Driftfishes ==
- Blue fathead (Cubiceps caeruleus)
- Cape fathead (Cubiceps capensis)
- Longfin cigarfish (Cubiceps gracilis)
- Bigeye cigarfish (Cubiceps pauciradiatus)
- Man-of-war fish (Nomeus gronovii)
- Banded driftfish (Psenes arafurensis)
- Freckled driftfish (Psenes cyanophrys)
- Bluefin driftfish (Psenes pellucidus)
- Twospine driftfish (Psenes sio)

== Mojarras ==
- Irish mojarra (Diapterus auratus)
- Golden mojarra (Diapterus aureolus)
- Peruvian mojarra (Diapterus peruvianus)
- Rhombic mojarra (Diapterus rhombeus)
- Spotfin mojarra (Eucinostomus argenteus)
- Eucinostomus currani
- Dow's mojarra (Eucinostomus dowii)
- Darkspot mojarra (Eucinostomus entomelas)
- Graceful mojarra (Eucinostomus gracilis)
- Silver jenny (Eucinostomus gula)
- Tidewater mojarra (Eucinostomus harengulus)
- Bigeye mojarra (Eucinostomus havana)
- Slender mojarra (Eucinostomus jonesii)
- Mottled mojarra (Eucinostomus lefroyi)
- Eucinostomus melanopterus
- Maracaibo mojarra (Eugerres awlae)
- Black axillary mojarra (Eugerres axillaris)
- Brazilian mojarra (Eugerres brasilianus)
- Short fin mojarra (Eugerres brevimanus)
- Eugerres lineatus
- Mexican mojarra (Eugerres mexicanus)
- Striped mojarra (Eugerres plumieri)
- Yellow fin mojarra (Gerres cinereus)
- Deep-bodied mojarra (Gerres erythrourus)
- Whipfin mojarra (Gerres filamentosus)
- Gerres limbatus
- Strongspine silver-biddy (Gerres longirostris)
- Guinean striped mojarra (Gerres nigri)
- Slender silver-biddy (Gerres oblongus)
- Common silver-biddy (Gerres oyena)
- Gerres simillimus
- Common silver belly (Gerres subfasciatus)
- Longfin mojarra (Pentaprion longimanus)

== Moronids ==
- European seabass (Dicentrarchus labrax)
- Spotted seabass (Dicentrarchus punctatus)
- White perch (Morone americana)
- White bass (Morone chrysops)
- Yellow bass (Morone mississippiensis)
- Striped bass (Morone saxatilis)

== Gempylids ==
- Striped escolar (Diplospinus multistriatus)
- Snake mackerel (Gempylus serpens)
- Escolar (Lepidocybium flavobrunneum)
- Black snake mackerel (Nealotus tripes)
- Black gemfish (Nesiarchus nasutus)
- Roudi escolar (Promethichthys prometheus)
- Oilfish (Ruvettus pretiosus)

== Remoras ==
- Live sharksucker (Echeneis naucrates)
- Slender suckerfish (Phtheirichthys lineatus)
- White suckerfish (Remora albescens)
- Whalesucker (Remora australis)
- Spearfish remora (Remora brachyptera)
- Marlin sucker (Remora osteochir)
- Common remora (Remora remora)

== Deepwater cardinalfishes ==
- Epigonus affinis
- Constance deepwater cardinalfish (Epigonus constanciae)
- Pencil cardinal (Epigonus denticulatus)
- Bigeye deepwater cardinalfish (Epigonus pandionis)
- Deepsea cardinalfish (Epigonus telescopus)
- Microichthys coccoi

== Grammatids ==
- Yellowcheek basslet (Gramma linki)
- Royal gramma (Gramma loreto)
- Blackcap basslet (Gramma melacara)
- Dusky basslet (Lipogramma anabantoides)
- Banded basslet (Lipogramma evides)
- Bicolor basslet (Lipogramma klayi)
- Royal basslet (Lipogramma regia)
- Rosy basslet (Lipogramma rosea)
- Threeline basslet (Lipogramma trilineata)

== Eelpout species ==
- Hadropareia middendorffii
- Hadropogonichthys lindbergi
- Iluocoetes elongatus
- Lycenchelys hippopotamus
- Lycenchelys monstrosa
- Ebony eelpout (Lycodes concolor)
- Shulupaoluk (Lycodes jugoricus)
- Paamiut eelpout (Lycodes paamiuti)
- Atlantic soft pout (Melanostigma atlanticum)
- Pachycara bulbiceps
- Pachycara crassiceps
- Pachycara crossacanthum
- Phucocoetes latitans

== Priacanthids ==
- Glasseye snapper (Heteropriacanthus cruentatus)
- Alalaua (Priacanthus alalaua)
- Atlantic bigeye (Priacanthus arenatus)
- Short bigeye (Pristigenys alta)
- Popeye catalufa (Pristigenys serrula)

== Opistognathids ==
- Higman's jawfish (Lonchopisthus higmani)
- Palemouth jawfish (Lonchopisthus lemur)
- Swordtail jawfish (Lonchopisthus micrognathus)
- Longtailed jawfish (Lonchopisthus sinuscalifornicus)
- Yellowhead jawfish (Opistognathus aurifrons)
- Opistognathus fossoris
- Galapagos jawfish (Opistognathus galapagensis)
- Yellow jawfish (Opistognathus gilberti)
- Scalecheek jawfish (Opistognathus leprocarus)
- Moustache jawfish (Opistognathus lonchurus)
- Banded jawfish (Opistognathus macrognathus)
- Mottled jawfish (Opistognathus maxillosus)
- Largescale jawfish (Opistognathus megalepis)
- Megamouth jawfish (Opistognathus melachasme)
- Yellowmouth jawfish (Opistognathus nothus)
- Panamanian jawfish (Opistognathus panamaensis)
- Finespotted jawfish (Opistognathus punctatus)
- Giant jawfish (Opistognathus rhomaleus)
- Opistognathus robinsi
- Blue-spotted jawfish (Opistognathus rosenblatti)
- Bullseye jawfish (Opistognathus scops)
- Dark-spotted jawfish (Opistognathus signatus)
- Dusky jawfish (Opistognathus whitehursti)

== Nandids ==
- Nandus nandus
- Nandus nebulosus
- Nandus oxyrhynchus
- Malayan leaffish (Pristolepis fasciata)
- Malabar leaffish (Pristolepis marginata)

== Sandperches ==
- Blue cod (Parapercis colias)
- Blackflag sandperch (Parapercis signata)
- Somali sandperch (Parapercis somaliensis)
- Parapercis striolata
- Peppered grubfish (Parapercis xanthozona)
- Namorado sandperch (Pseudopercis numida)

== Stromateids ==
- Gulf butterfish (Peprilus burti)
- Pacific harvestfish (Peprilus medius)
- American harvestfish (Peprilus paru)
- Pacific butterfish (Peprilus simillimus)
- Salema butterfish (Peprilus snyderi)
- Blue butterfish (Stromateus fiatola)
- Stromateus stellatus

== Barracudas ==
- Guinean barracuda (Sphyraena afra)
- Pacific barracuda (Sphyraena argentea)
- Great barracuda (Sphyraena barracuda)
- Northern sennet (Sphyraena borealis)
- Mexican barracuda (Sphyraena ensis)
- Guachanche barracuda (Sphyraena guachancho)
- Pelican barracuda (Sphyraena idiastes)
- European barracuda (Sphyraena sphyraena)
- Yellowmouth barracuda (Sphyraena viridensis)

== Acropomatids ==
- Blackmouth bass (Synagrops bellus)
- Synagrops japonicus
- Smallscale splitfin (Synagrops microlepis)
- Keelcheek bass (Synagrops spinosus)
- Threespine bass (Synagrops trispinosus)
- Black verilus (Verilus sordidus)

== Weevers ==
- Spotted weever (Trachinus araneus)
- Guinean weever (Trachinus armatus)
- Greater weever (Trachinus draco)
- Striped weever (Trachinus lineolatus)
- Cape Verde weever (Trachinus pellegrini)
- Starry weever (Trachinus radiatus)

== Other Perciformes species ==
- Akarotaxis nudiceps
- Deepbody boarfish (Antigonia capros)
- Shortspine boarfish (Antigonia combatia)
- Silver-rag driftfish (Ariomma bondi)
- Brown driftfish (Ariomma melanum)
- Spotted driftfish (Ariomma regulus)
- Artedidraco glareobarbatus
- Bathydraco joannae
- Blennodesmus scapularis
- Bovichtus chilensis
- Blue and gold fusilier (Caesio caerulaurea)
- Parrot seaperch (Callanthias ruber)
- Boarfish (Capros aper)
- Barred seabass (Centrarchops chapini)
- Red bandfish (Cepola macrophthalma)
- Saddled sandburrower (Chalixodytes tauensis)
- Champsodon capensis
- Natal fingerfin (Chirodactylus jessicalenorum)
- Congrogadus hierichthys
- Coreoperca whiteheadi
- Pompano dolphinfish (Coryphaena equiselis)
- Mahi-mahi (Coryphaena hippurus)
- Silver tiger fish (Datnioides polota)
- African sicklefish (Drepane africana)
- Everglades pygmy sunfish (Elassoma evergladei)
- Gulf Coast pygmy sunfish (Elassoma gilberti)
- Okefenokee pygmy sunfish (Elassoma okefenokee)
- Banded pygmy sunfish (Elassoma zonatum)
- Red rover (Emmelichthys ruber)
- Atlantic rubyfish (Erythrocles monodi)
- Two-spined blackfish (Gadopsis bispinosus)
- Kissing gourami (Helostoma temminkii)
- Atlantic pricklefish (Howella atlantica)
- Indo-Pacific sailfish (Istiophorus platypterus)
- Kraemeria tongaensis
- Spotted flagtail (Kuhlia marginata)
- Kuhlia mugil
- Jungle perch (Kuhlia rupestris)
- Incubator fish (Kurtus gulliveri)
- Nile perch (Lates niloticus)
- Sleek lates (Lates stappersii)
- Atlantic emperor (Lethrinus atlanticus)
- Red axil emperor (Lethrinus conchyliatus)
- Blackeye emperor (Lethrinus enigmaticus)
- Lancer (Lethrinus genivittatus)
- Pacific tripletail (Lobotes pacificus)
- Atlantic tripletail (Lobotes surinamensis)
- Louvar (Luvarus imperialis)
- Micropercops swinhonis
- Redspine threadfin bream (Nemipterus nemurus)
- Neodontobutis aurarmus
- Paracaristius aquilus
- Paracaristius nemorosus
- Patagonotothen cornucola
- Shortfin sweeper (Pempheris poeyi)
- Glassy sweeper (Pempheris schomburgkii)
- Bigspine boarfish (Pentaceros decacanthus)
- Japanese armorhead (Pentaceros japonicus)
- Blue whiptail (Pentapodus emeryii)
- Tidepool gunnel (Pholis nebulosa)
- Saddleback gunnel (Pholis ornata)
- Platyberyx opalescens
- Whitespotted longfin (Plesiops nigricans)
- Antarctic silverfish (Pleuragramma antarctica)
- Pogonophryne barsukovi
- African leaffish (Polycentropsis abbreviata)
- Forktail dottyback (Pseudochromis dixurus)
- Striped dottyback (Pseudochromis sankeyi)
- Cobia (Rachycentron canadum)
- Racovitzia glacialis
- Spotted scat (Scatophagus argus)
- Stout infantfish (Schindleria brevipinguis)
- Premature floater (Schindleria praematura)
- Longfin escolar (Scombrolabrax heterolepis)
- Magnificent rabbitfish (Siganus magnificus)
- Marbled spinefoot (Siganus rivulatus)
- Vermiculated spinefoot (Siganus vermiculatus)
- Shortnose whiting (Sillago arabica)
- Slender whiting (Sillago attenuata)
- Japanese whiting (Sillago japonica)
- Sineleotris chalmersi
- Siniperca obscura
- Slope bass (Symphysanodon berryi)
- Fat slope bass (Symphysanodon octoactinus)
- Bigeye squaretail (Tetragonurus atlanticus)
- Smalleye squaretail (Tetragonurus cuvieri)
- Mediterranean spearfish (Tetrapturus belone)
- Longbill spearfish (Tetrapturus pfluegeri)
- Banded archerfish (Toxotes jaculatrix)
- Lorent'z archerfish (Toxotes lorentzi)
- Smallscale archerfish (Toxotes microlepis)
- Big scale archerfish (Toxotes oligolepis)
- Freckled wriggler (Xenisthmus balius)
- Swordfish (Xiphias gladius)

== See also ==
- Lists of IUCN Red List least concern species
- List of near threatened fishes
- List of vulnerable fishes
- List of endangered fishes
- List of critically endangered fishes
- List of recently extinct fishes
- List of data deficient fishes
- Sustainable seafood advisory lists and certification
