= Copadichromis geertsi =

Conservation status
- Least Concern (IUCN 3.1)

Scientific classification
- Kingdom: Animalia
- Phylum: Chordata
- Class: Actinopterygii
- Order: Cichliformes
- Family: Cichlidae
- Genus: Copadichromis
- Species: C. geertsi

Binomial name
- Copadichromis geertsi Konings, 1999

Species of fish

Copadichromis geertsi is a species of haplochromine cichlid which is endemic to Lake Malawi.

== Description ==
Copadichromis geertsi is a small to medium-sized cichlid, growing to a standard length of 12.8 centimetres (5.0 in), which shows two, occasionally just one, clear spots on the sides. The males are dark in colour with the upper body varying from light blue to yellow towards the head and on the dorsal fin. It can be distinguished from other members of the genus Copadichromis by the two spots, the colour of the breeding males being black with a pale blue to yellow flash on its head and back. The females and non-breeding males do not have the yellow colour in the anal fin seen females and non breeding males of the otherwise similar Copadichromis pleurostigmoides and they are grey in colour with two black spots.

== Distribution ==
Copadichromis geertsi is endemic to Lake Malawi along the eastern shore from the Nsinje River in Malawi) north as far as Thundu in Mozambique. It has only been recorded from four sites.

== Habitat and ecology ==
Copadichromis geertsi is found in areas of softer substrates mixed with rocks at depths ranging between 25–50 metres (82–164 ft), and is only occasionally recorded at depths shallower than 25 metres (82 ft). The females are sometimes found foraging in groups in open water and single individual females will move between the territories held by the breeding males. This species feeds on small items that it takes from the water column.

The breeding males excavate cave crater spawning sites in the mixed habitat below 25 metres (82 ft). The spawning site is normally dug out from under and adjacent a rock and has a diameter of 50–200 centimetres (20–79 in). The territorial male digs out the sand from underneath the rock, piling it up and using it to construct a semicircular wall which surrounds the spawning site. The breeding males normally space their spawning sites 4 metres (13 ft) from each other.

After the females have mated they mouthbrood the fertilised eggs for 30–36 days and when they are ready they move into shallow water where join the schools of juvenile utaka which are frequently found above nests of kampango (Bagrus meridionalis), where they release the free swimming fry.

== Human usage ==
Copadichromis geertsi is found in the aquarium trade, where it is sometimes called "Virginialis blotch". They have been bred in captivity but wild caught adults are still available. Overfishing using open-water seine nets, of a type called "chirimila nets" in Lake Malawi, is potentially a threat to this species.

== Etymology ==
This species was named in 1999 by the Dutch ichthyologist and cichlid specialist Ad Konings, in its specific name he honours Martin Geerts of the Dutch Cichlid Association in recognition of his scientific knowledge of cichlids and for the support he gave to Konings during a number of expeditions to Lakes Malawi and Tanganyika.
