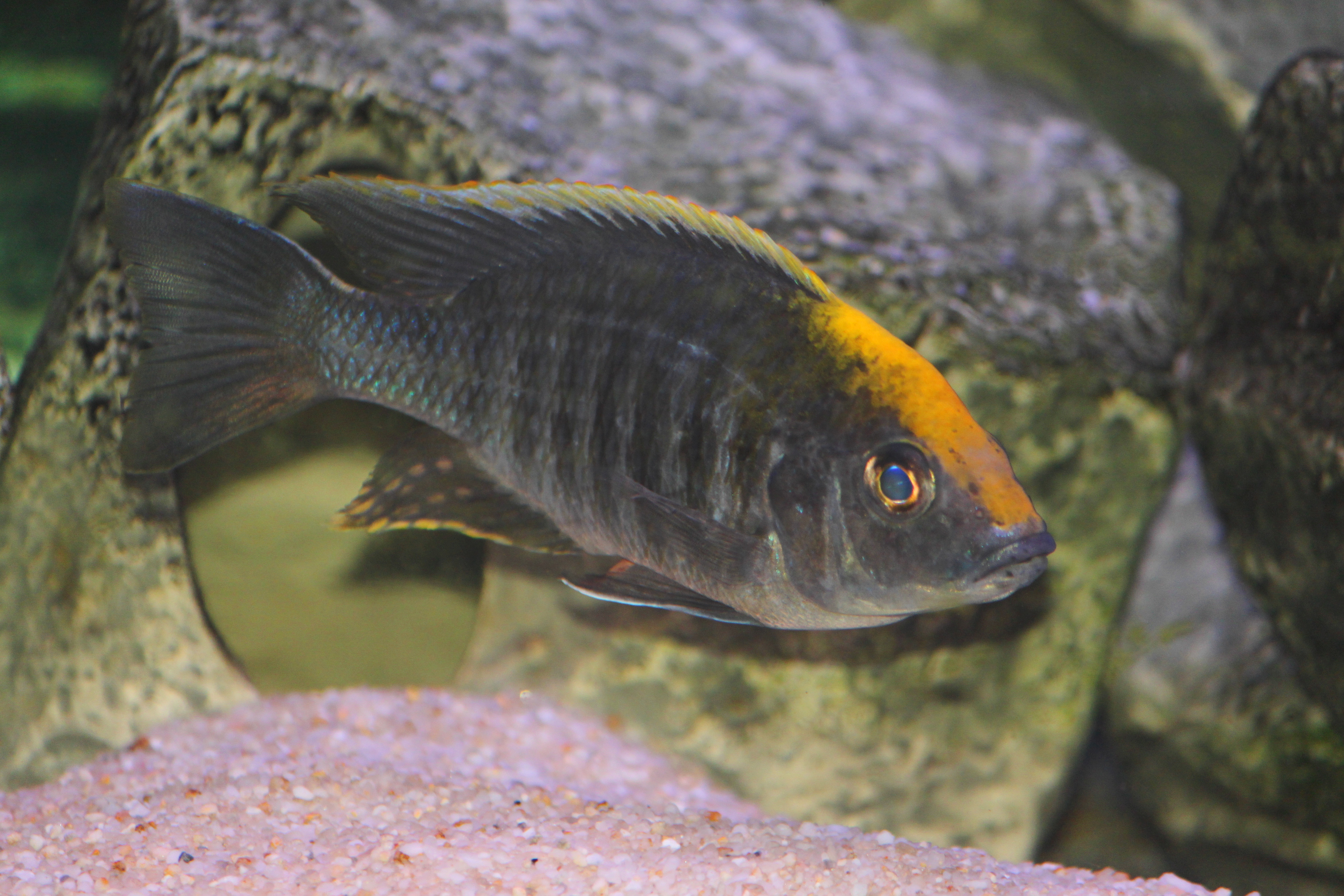

Conservation status
- Critically Endangered (IUCN 3.1)

Scientific classification
- Kingdom: Animalia
- Phylum: Chordata
- Class: Actinopterygii
- Order: Cichliformes
- Family: Cichlidae
- Genus: Aulonocara
- Species: A. maylandi

Binomial name
- Aulonocara maylandi Trewavas, 1984

= Sulfurhead aulonocara =

Species of fish

The sulfurhead aulonocara (Aulonocara maylandi) or sulfurhead peacock is a species of haplochromine cichlid which is endemic to Lake Malawi in the country of Malawi and has only been observed on West Reef (Luwala Reef) and Eccles Reef (Chimwalani Reef). It is threatened by collection for the aquarium trade and this has caused a 70% reduction in numbers. In this mouthbrooding species, the eggs are cared for by the females only, and it is found over mixed sand and rocky areas where they hunt small invertebrates in the sand. It closely resembles the blue orchid aulonocara (Aulonocara kandeense) though it develops a yellow blaze across its dorsal In the past these two taxa have been considered to be subspecies. The specific name honours Hans-Joachim Mayland, an author on cichlids and a fishkeeper, brought the species to the attention of Ethelwynn Trewavas.
