= M. mola =

M. mola may refer to:

- Mola mola, a fish species
- Mylochromis mola, a fish species

== See also ==
- Mola (disambiguation)
