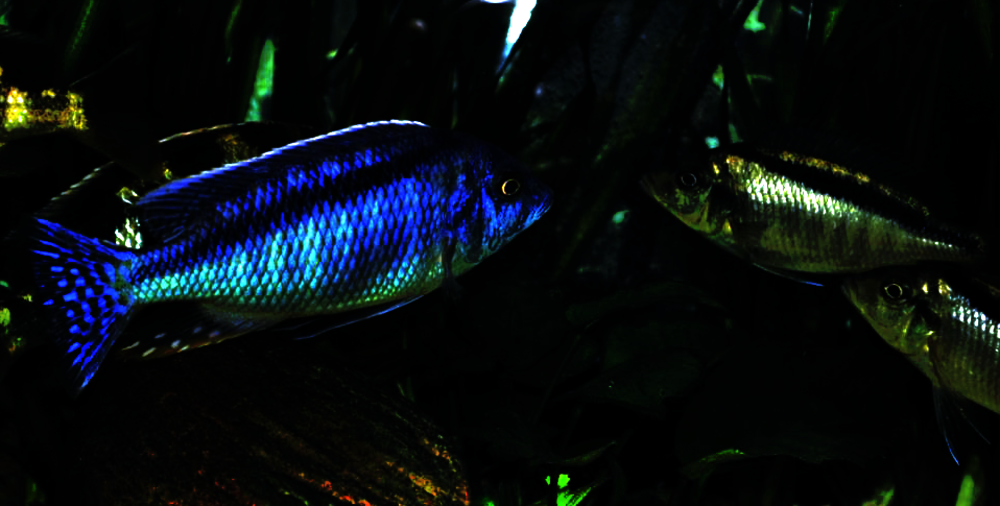
- Mylochromis melanonotus

Scientific classification
- Kingdom: Animalia
- Phylum: Chordata
- Class: Actinopterygii
- Division: Teleostei
- Order: Cichliformes
- Family: Cichlidae
- Tribe: Haplochromini
- Genus: Mylochromis; Regan, 1920

Type species
- Chromis lateristriga Günther, 1864

Synonyms
- Maravichromis Eccles & Trewavas, 1989; Platygnathochromis Eccles & Trewavas, 1989

= Mylochromis =

Genus of fishes

Mylochromis is a genus of haplochromine cichlids endemic to Lake Malawi in Eastern Africa.

== Species ==
There are currently 24 recognized species in this genus:

- Mylochromis anaphyrmus (W. E. Burgess & H. R. Axelrod, 1973)
- Mylochromis balteatus (Trewavas, 1935)
- Mylochromis chekopae G. F. Turner & Howarth, 2001
- Mylochromis durophagus G. F. Turner, 2024
- Mylochromis ensatus G. F. Turner & Howarth, 2001
- Mylochromis epichorialis (Trewavas, 1935)
- Mylochromis ericotaenia (Regan, 1922)
- Mylochromis formosus (Trewavas, 1935)
- Mylochromis gracilis (Trewavas, 1935) (Torpedostripe Haplochromis)
- Mylochromis guentheri (Regan, 1922)
- Mylochromis incola (Trewavas, 1935) (Golden Mola Hap)
- Mylochromis labidodon (Trewavas, 1935)
- Mylochromis lateristriga (Günther, 1864) (Basket Hap)
- Mylochromis melanonotus (Regan, 1922) (Yellow Black Line Hap)
- Mylochromis melanotaenia (Regan, 1922)
- Mylochromis mola (Trewavas, 1935) (Mola Hap)
- Mylochromis mollis (Trewavas, 1935) (Softy hap)
- Mylochromis obtusus (Trewavas, 1935)
- Mylochromis plagiotaenia (Regan, 1922)
- Mylochromis rotundus G. F. Turner, 2024
- Mylochromis semipalatus (Trewavas, 1935)
- Mylochromis sphaerodon (Regan, 1922) (Roundtooth Hap)
- Mylochromis spilostichus (Trewavas, 1935)
- Mylochromis subocularis (Günther, 1894)
