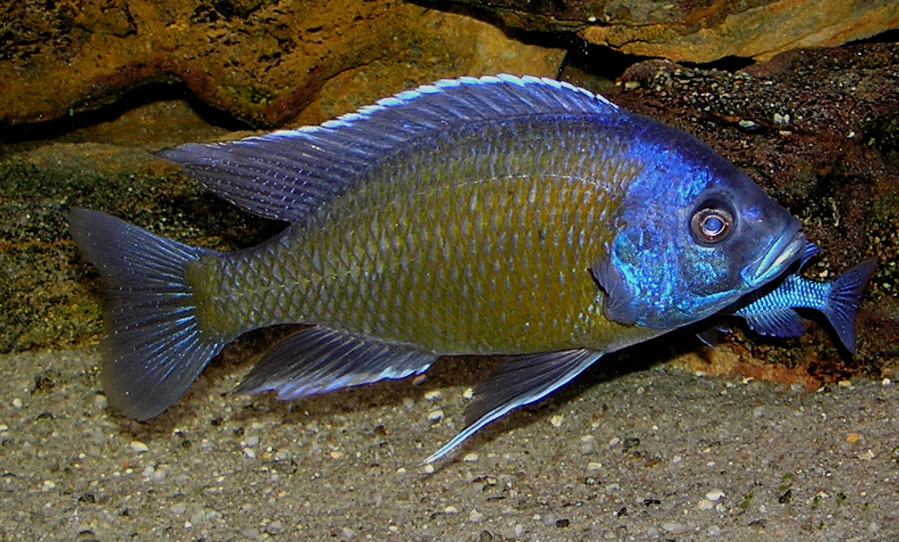
- Male redfin hap (C. borleyi) 'Kadango' population

Scientific classification
- Kingdom: Animalia
- Phylum: Chordata
- Class: Actinopterygii
- Order: Cichliformes
- Family: Cichlidae
- Tribe: Haplochromini
- Genus: Copadichromis; Eccles & Trewavas, 1989

Type species
- Haplochromis quadrimaculatus Regan, 1922

= Copadichromis =

Genus of fishes

Copadichromis is a genus of haplochromine cichlids endemic to Lake Malawi in Eastern Africa. Copadichromis are part of a group known as utaka and are popular with aquarists, as this genus is relatively peaceful in captivity compared to the mbuna.

== Species ==
There are currently 25 recognized species in this genus:

- Copadichromis atripinnis Stauffer & Te. Sato, 2002
- Copadichromis azureus Konings, 1990
- Copadichromis borleyi (Iles, 1960) (redfin hap, goldfin hap)
- Copadichromis chizumuluensis Stauffer & Konings, 2006
- Copadichromis chrysonotus (Boulenger, 1908)
- Copadichromis cyaneus (Trewavas, 1935)
- Copadichromis cyanocephalus Stauffer & Konings, 2006
- Copadichromis diplostigma Stauffer & Konings, 2006
- Copadichromis geertsi Konings, 1999
- Copadichromis ilesi Konings, 1999
- Copadichromis insularis Stauffer & Konings, 2006
- Copadichromis jacksoni (Iles, 1960)
- Copadichromis likomae (Iles, 1960)
- Copadichromis mbenjii Konings, 1990 (Quads Hap)
- Copadichromis melas Stauffer & Konings, 2006
- Copadichromis mloto (Iles, 1960)
- Copadichromis nkatae (Iles, 1960)
- Copadichromis parvus Stauffer & Konings, 2006
- Copadichromis pleurostigma (Trewavas, 1935)
- Copadichromis pleurostigmoides (Iles, 1960)
- Copadichromis quadrimaculatus (Regan, 1922)
- Copadichromis trewavasae Konings, 1999
- Copadichromis trimaculatus (Iles, 1960) (Verduya's hap)
- Copadichromis verduyni Konings, 1990
- Copadichromis virginalis (Iles, 1960)

In addition, several local populations are known. Most are probably colour morphs or at best subspecies. But some seem to be distinct species, such as:

- Copadichromis sp. 'Virginalis Kajose'
