= Aulonocara auditor =

Conservation status
- Data Deficient (IUCN 3.1)

Scientific classification
- Kingdom: Animalia
- Phylum: Chordata
- Class: Actinopterygii
- Order: Cichliformes
- Family: Cichlidae
- Genus: Aulonocara
- Species: A. auditor

Binomial name
- Aulonocara auditor (Trewavas, 1935)

Synonyms
- Trematocranus auditor Trewavas, 1935

Species of fish

Aulonocara auditor is a species of haplochromine cichlid endemic to Lake Malawi. It was known only from the holotype collected in northern Lake Malawi near Vua, Malawi. The IUCN state that this species may possibly be extinct due to beach seining within its limited range but there are claims that it was observed in 1989 and was quite numerous, although this was later retracted and it was stated that these observations referred to Aulonocara aquilonium. Following an examination of the holotype, this examination also suggests that A. auditor may not be a species of Aulonocara and that more material needs to be collected and studied.
