= Golden mola hap =

Conservation status
- Least Concern (IUCN 3.1)

Scientific classification
- Kingdom: Animalia
- Phylum: Chordata
- Class: Actinopterygii
- Order: Cichliformes
- Family: Cichlidae
- Genus: Mylochromis
- Species: M. incola

Binomial name
- Mylochromis incola (Trewavas, 1935)

Synonyms
- Haplochromis incola Trewavas, 1935; Cyrtocara incola (Trewavas, 1935); Maravichromis incola (Trewavas, 1935)

Species of fish

The golden mola hap (Mylochromis incola) is a species of cichlid endemic to Lake Malawi where it is found in shallow, vegetated waters. This species can reach a length of 19.9 centimetres (7.8 in) TL. This species can also be found in the aquarium trade.
