= Copadichromis pleurostigma =

Conservation status
- Least Concern (IUCN 3.1)

Scientific classification
- Kingdom: Animalia
- Phylum: Chordata
- Class: Actinopterygii
- Order: Cichliformes
- Family: Cichlidae
- Genus: Copadichromis
- Species: C. pleurostigma

Binomial name
- Copadichromis pleurostigma (Trewavas, 1935)

Synonyms
- Haplochromis pleurostigma Trewavas, 1935

Species of fish

Copadichromis pleurostigma is a species of haplochromine cichlid which is endemic to Lake Malawi in the East African Rift system. It is occurs throughout the lake and therefore is found in Malawi, Mozambique, and Tanzania.
