= Aulonocara brevinidus =

Conservation status
- Least Concern (IUCN 3.1)

Scientific classification
- Kingdom: Animalia
- Phylum: Chordata
- Class: Actinopterygii
- Order: Cichliformes
- Family: Cichlidae
- Genus: Aulonocara
- Species: A. brevinidus

Binomial name
- Aulonocara brevinidus Konings, 1995

Species of fish

Aulonocara brevinidus is a species of haplochromine Cichlid it is endemic to Lake Malawi and widespread along the eastern shore of the lake. It is found in Malawi, Mozambique, and Tanzania. In this species the males defend small territories over sandy areas at depths of 20 metres (66 ft) where the excavate shallow nests, in denser populations these territories may be as little as 2 metres (6.6 ft) apart. The diet appears to consist of small invertebrates.
