= Copadichromis ilesi =

Conservation status
- Least Concern (IUCN 3.1)

Scientific classification
- Kingdom: Animalia
- Phylum: Chordata
- Class: Actinopterygii
- Order: Cichliformes
- Family: Cichlidae
- Genus: Copadichromis
- Species: C. ilesi

Binomial name
- Copadichromis ilesi Konings, 1999

Species of fish

Copadichromis ilesi is a species of haplochromine cichlid, which is endemic to Lake Malawi, where it is widespread, although not recorded from Mozambique. The specific name honours the British fisheries scientist and ichthyologist Thomas Derrick Iles (1927-2017).
