= Mylochromis labidodon =

Conservation status
- Least Concern (IUCN 3.1)

Scientific classification
- Kingdom: Animalia
- Phylum: Chordata
- Class: Actinopterygii
- Order: Cichliformes
- Family: Cichlidae
- Genus: Mylochromis
- Species: M. labidodon

Binomial name
- Mylochromis labidodon (Trewavas, 1935)

Synonyms
- Haplochromis labidodon Trewavas, 1935; Cyrtocara labidodon (Trewavas, 1935); Maravichromis labidodon (Trewavas, 1935)

Species of fish

Mylochromis labidodon is a species of cichlid endemic to Lake Malawi and Lake Malombe. This species can reach a length of 18 centimetres (7.1 in) TL. This species can also be found in the aquarium trade.
