= Mylochromis spilostichus =

Conservation status
- Least Concern (IUCN 3.1)

Scientific classification
- Kingdom: Animalia
- Phylum: Chordata
- Class: Actinopterygii
- Order: Cichliformes
- Family: Cichlidae
- Genus: Mylochromis
- Species: M. spilostichus

Binomial name
- Mylochromis spilostichus (Trewavas, 1935)

Synonyms
- Haplochromis spilostichus Trewavas, 1935; Cyrtocara spilostichus (Trewavas, 1935); Maravichromis spilostichus (Trewavas, 1935); Sciaenochromis spilostichus (Trewavas, 1935)

Species of fish

Mylochromis spilostichus is a species of cichlid endemic to Lake Malawi where it is only known from the southern portion of the lake, particularly around the Nankhumba Peninsula. Is can be found over sandy substrates at depths of from 18 to 70 metres (59 to 230 ft). This species can reach a length of 22.2 centimetres (8.7 in) TL. This species can also be found in the aquarium trade.
