= Copadichromis mbenjii =

Conservation status
- Least Concern (IUCN 3.1)

Scientific classification
- Kingdom: Animalia
- Phylum: Chordata
- Class: Actinopterygii
- Order: Cichliformes
- Family: Cichlidae
- Genus: Copadichromis
- Species: C. mbenjii

Binomial name
- Copadichromis mbenjii Konings, 1990

Species of fish

Copadichromis mbenjii is a species of haplochromine cichlid which is endemic to Lake Malawi. It is only found around Mbenje Island from where it takes its specific name.
