= Aulonocara gertrudae =

Conservation status
- Least Concern (IUCN 3.1)

Scientific classification
- Kingdom: Animalia
- Phylum: Chordata
- Class: Actinopterygii
- Order: Cichliformes
- Family: Cichlidae
- Genus: Aulonocara
- Species: A. gertrudae

Binomial name
- Aulonocara gertrudae Konings, 1995

Species of fish

Aulonocara gertrudae is a species of haplochromine cichlid which is endemic to Lake Malawi, being found in Malawi, Mozambique, and Tanzania. The habitat varies between populations, those south of the Ruhuhu River are sand dwellers which exploit the sandy muddy substrates found near river mouths, while those to the north of the Ruhuhu will occupy rocky habitats too. This is thought to be cause there are fewer rock inhabiting congeners north of the Ruhuhu. The territorial males of this species excavate a burrow in the sand or they may use a cavity formed in a rocky area, especially in the northern populations. The females are found in small foraging groups in the vicinity of the males. The specific name honours Konings' wife, Gertrude Dubin.
