= Copadichromis trewavasae =

Conservation status
- Least Concern (IUCN 3.1)

Scientific classification
- Kingdom: Animalia
- Phylum: Chordata
- Class: Actinopterygii
- Order: Cichliformes
- Family: Cichlidae
- Genus: Copadichromis
- Species: C. trewavasae

Binomial name
- Copadichromis trewavasae Konings, 1999

Species of fish

Copadichromis trewavasae is a species of haplochromine cichlid which is endemic to Lake Malawi. It is widespread in the Lake, and so occurs in Malawi, Mozambique, and Tanzania. It is often found in areas rich in sediment where muddy deposits cover the underlying substrate, It feeds by picking out particles from the water column. This species of Copadichromis is named after noted ichthyologist Ethelwynn Trewavas.
