= Mylochromis gracilis =

Conservation status
- Least Concern (IUCN 3.1)

Scientific classification
- Kingdom: Animalia
- Phylum: Chordata
- Class: Actinopterygii
- Order: Cichliformes
- Family: Cichlidae
- Genus: Mylochromis
- Species: M. gracilis

Binomial name
- Mylochromis gracilis (Trewavas, 1935)

Synonyms
- Haplochromis gracilis Trewavas, 1935; Cyrtocara gracilis (Trewavas, 1935); Maravichromis gracilis (Trewavas, 1935); Sciaenochromis gracilis (Trewavas, 1935)

Species of fish

Mylochromis gracilis, known as the happy or the Haplochromis torpedo stripe (in aquarium trade), is a species of cichlid endemic to Lake Malawi where it is only known from sandy areas in the southern end of the lake. This species can reach a length of 22 centimetres (8.7 in) TL.
