= Copadichromis verduyni =

Conservation status
- Least Concern (IUCN 3.1)

Scientific classification
- Kingdom: Animalia
- Phylum: Chordata
- Class: Actinopterygii
- Order: Cichliformes
- Family: Cichlidae
- Genus: Copadichromis
- Species: C. verduyni

Binomial name
- Copadichromis verduyni Konings, 1990

Species of fish

Copadichromis verduyni is a species of haplochromine cichlid which is endemic to Lake Malawi where it is found on the eastern shore and in the south eastern arm of the lake. It occurs in Malawi and Mozambique. This species inhabits the interface between sandy areas and rocky areas. Of all its congeners, this species defends the most cryptic spawning sites, these are found at depths of 9–15 metres (30–49 ft). The females and non-territorial males feed on plankton caught 1–3 metres (3.3–9.8 ft) above the lake bed and also on benthic invertebrates. Konings named this species after the Dutch cichlid dealer Dirk Verduyn (1942-2018).
