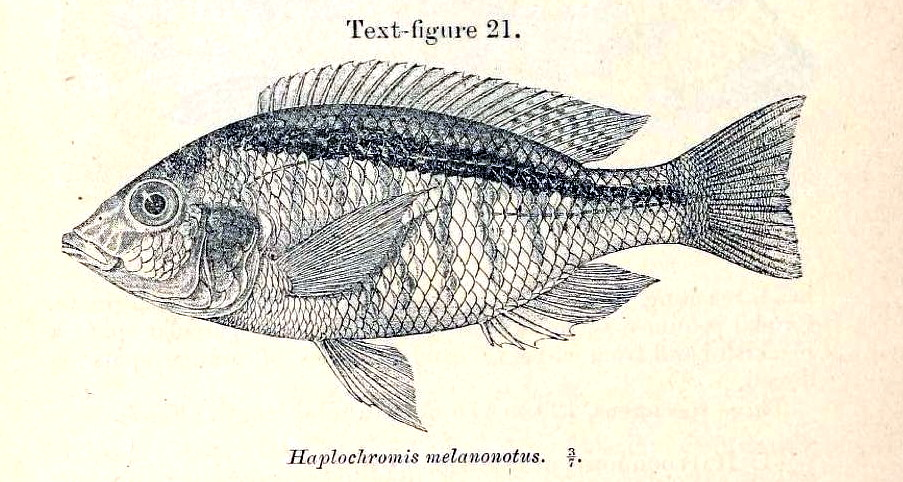

Conservation status
- Least Concern (IUCN 3.1)

Scientific classification
- Kingdom: Animalia
- Phylum: Chordata
- Class: Actinopterygii
- Order: Cichliformes
- Family: Cichlidae
- Genus: Mylochromis
- Species: M. mollis

Binomial name
- Mylochromis mollis (Trewavas, 1935)

Synonyms
- Haplochromis mollis Trewavas, 1935; Cyrtocara mollis (Trewavas, 1935); Maravichromis mollis (Trewavas, 1935)

= Softy hap =

Species of fish

The softy hap (Mylochromis mollis) is a species of cichlid endemic to Lake Malawi. This species can reach a length of 16 centimetres (6.3 in) TL. This species can also be found in the aquarium trade.
