= Mylochromis obtusus =

Conservation status
- Least Concern (IUCN 3.1)

Scientific classification
- Kingdom: Animalia
- Phylum: Chordata
- Class: Actinopterygii
- Order: Cichliformes
- Family: Cichlidae
- Genus: Mylochromis
- Species: M. obtusus

Binomial name
- Mylochromis obtusus (Trewavas, 1935)

Synonyms
- Haplochromis obtusus Trewavas, 1935; Cyrtocara obtusa (Trewavas, 1935); Maravichromis obtusus (Trewavas, 1935)

Species of fish

Mylochromis obtusus is a species of cichlid endemic to Lake Malawi where it is currently only known from sandy areas in the southern portion of the lake. This species can reach a length of 22 centimetres (8.7 in) TL.
