= Aulonocara rostratum =

Conservation status
- Least Concern (IUCN 3.1)

Scientific classification
- Kingdom: Animalia
- Phylum: Chordata
- Class: Actinopterygii
- Order: Cichliformes
- Family: Cichlidae
- Genus: Aulonocara
- Species: A. rostratum

Binomial name
- Aulonocara rostratum Trewavas, 1935

Species of fish

Aulonocara rostratum is a species of haplochromine cichlid. It is endemic to Lake Malawi in Malawi and Tanzania. The males gather in loose aggregations in sandy areas, defending small territories from other males. The females do something else.
