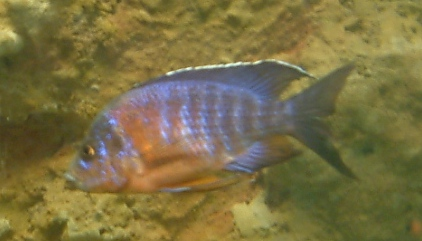
- Male fairy cichlid (A. hansbaenschi)

Scientific classification
- Kingdom: Animalia
- Phylum: Chordata
- Class: Actinopterygii
- Order: Cichliformes
- Family: Cichlidae
- Tribe: Haplochromini
- Genus: Aulonocara; Regan, 1922

Type species
- Aulonocara nyassae Regan, 1922

= Aulonocara =

Genus of fishes

Aulonocara is a genus of haplochromine cichlids endemic to Lake Malawi in East Africa. All Aulonocara species are maternal mouth brooders. Particularly in the aquarium hobby, Aulonocara species are also known as peacock cichlids, aulonocaras or simply "peacocks". This genus is strongly sexually dichromic, even by haplochromine standards.

As aquarium fish, they are best kept with other medium-sized nonaggressive cichlids from Lake Malawi. All peacock cichlids are known to be less aggressive than their Mbuna counterparts, and thrive in warmer waters that have a slightly basic pH.

== Species ==
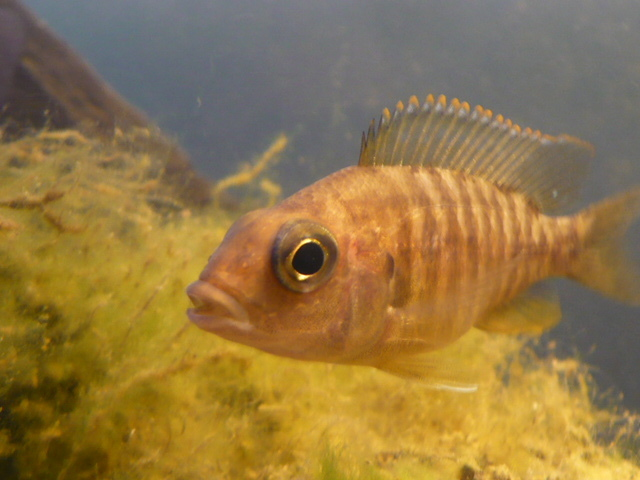
Female of an unidentified Aulonocara species

The 19 recognized species in this genus are:

- Aulonocara aquilonium Konings, 1995
- Aulonocara auditor (Trewavas, 1935)
- Aulonocara baenschi M. K. Meyer & Riehl, 1985 (nkhomo-benga peacock)
- Aulonocara brevinidus Konings, 1995
- Aulonocara ethelwynnae M. K. Meyer, Riehl & Zetzsche, 1987 (Chitande aulonocara)
- Aulonocara gertrudae Konings, 1995
- Aulonocara guentheri Eccles, 1989
- Aulonocara hueseri M. K. Meyer, Riehl & Zetzsche 1987 (night aulonocara)
- Aulonocara jacobfreibergi (D. S. Johnson, 1974) (Freiberg's peacock, eureka red peacock, fairy cichlid)
- Aulonocara kandeense Tawil & Allgayer, 1987 (blue orchid aulonocara)
- Aulonocara koningsi Tawil, 2003
- Aulonocara korneliae M. K. Meyer, Riehl & Zetzsche, 1987 (Chizumulu aulonocara)
- Aulonocara maylandi Trewavas, 1984 (sulfurhead peacock, sulfurhead aulonocara)
- Aulonocara nyassae Regan, 1922 (emperor cichlid)
- Aulonocara rostratum Trewavas, 1935
- Aulonocara saulosi M. K. Meyer, Riehl & Zetzsche, 1987 (greenface aulonocara)
- Aulonocara stonemani (W. E. Burgess & H. R. Axelrod, 1973)
- Aulonocara stuartgranti M. K. Meyer & Riehl, 1985 (flavescent peacock)
- Aulonocara trematocephalum (Boulenger, 1901)

Synonyms

- Aulonocara hansbaenschi M. K. Meyer, Riehl & Zetzsche, 1987; valid as A. stuartgranti (Fort Maguire aulonocara)
- Aulonocara steveni M. K. Meyer, Riehl & Zetzsche, 1987; valid as A. stuartgranti (pale Usisya aulonocara)
