= Mollas =

Mollas may refer to three places in Albania:

- Mollas, Elbasan, a village in the municipality of Cërrik, Elbasan County
- Mollas, Fier, a village in the municipality of Lushnjë, Fier County
- Mollas, Korçë, a village in the municipality of Kolonjë, Korçë County
- Mollas, Berat, a village in the municipality of Skrapar, Berat County

== See also ==
- Molas (disambiguation)
- Molass (disambiguation)
