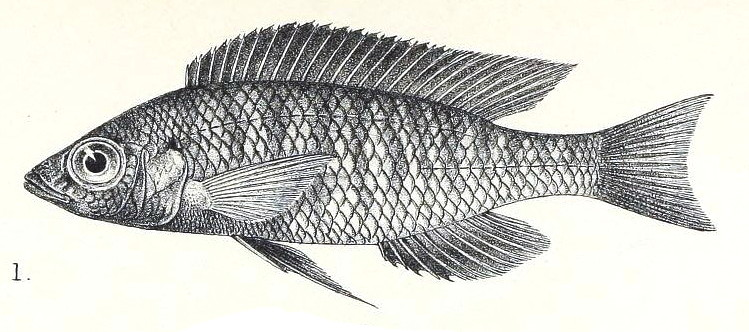
- Mchenga eucinostomus

Scientific classification
- Kingdom: Animalia
- Phylum: Chordata
- Class: Actinopterygii
- Order: Cichliformes
- Family: Cichlidae
- Tribe: Haplochromini
- Genus: Mchenga; Stauffer & Konings, 2006

Type species
- Copadichromis cyclicos Stauffer, LoVullo & McKaye, 1993

= Mchenga =

Genus of fishes

Mchenga is a small genus of haplochromine cichlids endemic to Lake Malawi in East Africa. They are part of a group known as utaka.

== Species ==
There are currently six recognized species in this genus:

- Mchenga conophoros (Stauffer, LoVullo & McKaye, 1993)
- Mchenga cyclicos (Stauffer, LoVullo & McKaye, 1993)
- Mchenga eucinostomus (Regan, 1922)
- Mchenga flavimanus (Iles, 1960)
- Mchenga inornata (Boulenger, 1908)
- Mchenga thinos (Stauffer, LoVullo & McKaye, 1993)
