= Mylochromis semipalatus =

Scientific classification
- Kingdom: Animalia
- Phylum: Chordata
- Class: Actinopterygii
- Order: Cichliformes
- Family: Cichlidae
- Genus: Mylochromis
- Species: M. semipalatus

Binomial name
- Mylochromis semipalatus (Trewavas, 1935)

Synonyms
- Haplochromis semipalatus Trewavas, 1935; Cyrtocara semipalatus (Trewavas, 1935); Maravichromis semipalatus (Trewavas, 1935)

Species of fish

Mylochromis semipalatus is a species of cichlid endemic to Lake Malawi. This species can reach a length of 18.5 centimetres (7.3 in) TL. This species can also be found in the aquarium trade.
