= C. cyaneus =

C. cyaneus may refer to:

- Ceanothus cyaneus, the San Diego buckbrush or lakeside ceanothus, a flowering plant species found in California and Baja California
- Circus cyaneus, the hen harrier, a bird of prey species that breeds in Eurasia
- Copadichromis cyaneus, a fish species found in Malawi, Mozambique and Tanzania
