= Mylochromis formosus =

Conservation status
- Least Concern (IUCN 3.1)

Scientific classification
- Kingdom: Animalia
- Phylum: Chordata
- Class: Actinopterygii
- Order: Cichliformes
- Family: Cichlidae
- Genus: Mylochromis
- Species: M. formosus

Binomial name
- Mylochromis formosus (Trewavas, 1935)

Synonyms
- Haplochromis formosus Trewavas, 1935; Cyrtocara formosa (Trewavas, 1935); Maravichromis formosus (Trewavas, 1935)

Species of fish

Mylochromis formosus is a species of cichlid endemic to Lake Malawi. This species can reach a length of 12.7 centimetres (5.0 in) TL. This species can also be found in the aquarium trade.
