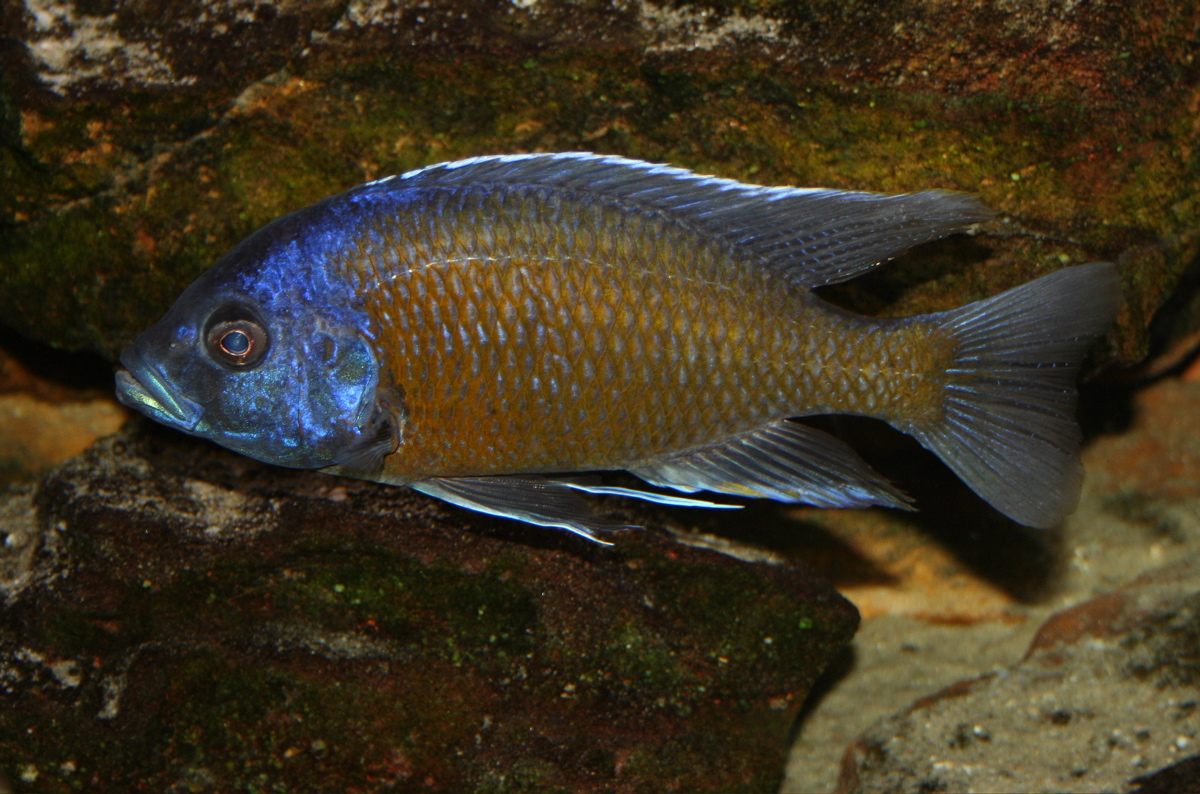
- male in captivity

Conservation status
- Least Concern (IUCN 3.1)

Scientific classification
- Kingdom: Animalia
- Phylum: Chordata
- Class: Actinopterygii
- Order: Cichliformes
- Family: Cichlidae
- Genus: Copadichromis
- Species: C. borleyi

Binomial name
- Copadichromis borleyi (Iles, 1960)

Synonyms
- Haplochromis borleyi Iles, 1960

= Copadichromis borleyi =

Species of fish

Copadichromis borleyi is a species of haplochromine cichlid fish endemic to Lake Malawi in East Africa. The species is popular in the fishkeeping hobby where it is frequently kept in aquariums. The species has numerous common names, including redfin and goldfin hap.

== Description ==
C. borleyi is a relatively small cichlid, males grow to 13–16 centimetres (5.1–6.3 inches) total length, while females are typically slightly smaller reaching 13 centimetres. In addition to these minor difference in size, the species displays marked sexual dimorphism with males displaying larger ventral fins marked with egg spots, light-blue edging to the dorsal and ventral fins, along with metallic blue colouration of the head, and yellow to red flanks. In contrast, females are silver-to-brown and display three black spots along their sides. Juveniles are monomorphic and are coloured like the adult females. Some intraspecific variation has been recorded with regard to colouration, these differently coloured forms are geographically restricted to certain localities in Lake Malawi.

== Distribution and habitat ==
C. borleyi is widespread in Lake Malawi, occurring along the coasts of Malawi, Mozambique and Tanzania. The species is limited to littoral zones with large rocks and boulders. The water in which species is found is warm (24–29 °C; 75–84 °F), hard and alkaline; typical of the water chemistry of Lake Malawi.

== Diet ==
The species feeds primarily on zooplankton, by means of specialized, suction feeding action and highly protrudable mouth.

== Taxonomy ==
The species was described in 1960 by Thomas Derrick Iles as Haplochromis borleyi, and was later moved to Copadichromis by David Eccles and Ethylwynn Trewavas. The species is also known under the synonym Cyrtocara borleyi, and is occasionally sold under the trade name of Haplochromis granderus. The specific name honours H. John H. Borley who was Director of the Game Fish & Tsetse Control Department of Nyasaland.

== Reproduction ==
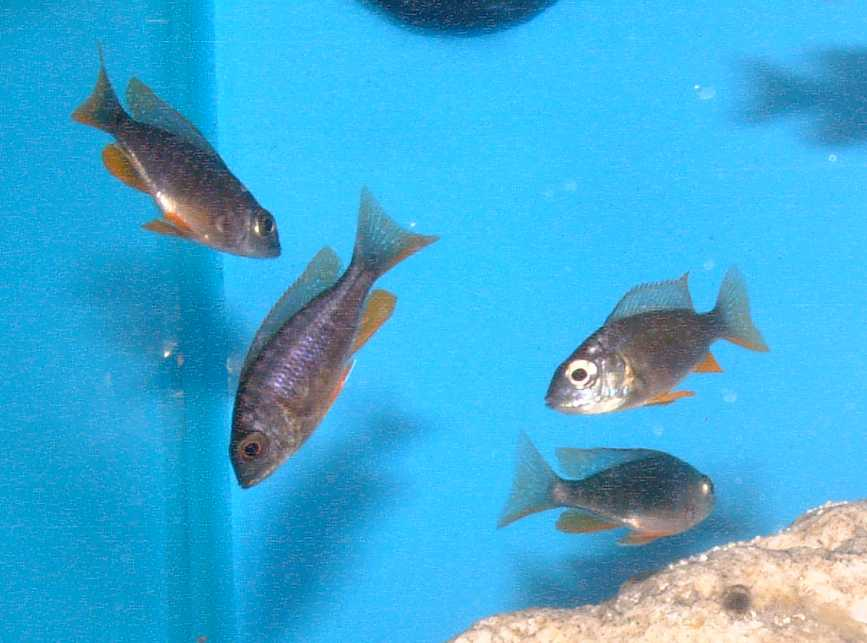
juveniles in captivity

C. borleyi is a polygamous, maternally mouthbrooding cichlid. Males frequently claim areas adjacent to, or on top of, large, submerged boulders and spawn on the horizontal upper surface of the boulder. Some geographic variants are known to build sand bowers atop large rocks in which spawning and courting takes place. The species has no defined breeding season and breeding occurs year-round.

== See also ==
- List of freshwater aquarium fish species
