= Mylochromis balteatus =

Conservation status
- Least Concern (IUCN 3.1)

Scientific classification
- Kingdom: Animalia
- Phylum: Chordata
- Class: Actinopterygii
- Order: Cichliformes
- Family: Cichlidae
- Genus: Mylochromis
- Species: M. balteatus

Binomial name
- Mylochromis balteatus (Trewavas, 1935)

Synonyms
- Haplochromis balteatus Trewavas, 1935; Cyrtocara balteata (Trewavas, 1935); Maravichromis balteatus (Trewavas, 1935)

Species of fish

Mylochromis balteatus is a species of cichlid endemic to Lake Malawi preferring areas with sandy substrates, which can reach a length of 16.2 centimetres (6.4 in) TL.
