= Utaka =

Common name for several species of fish

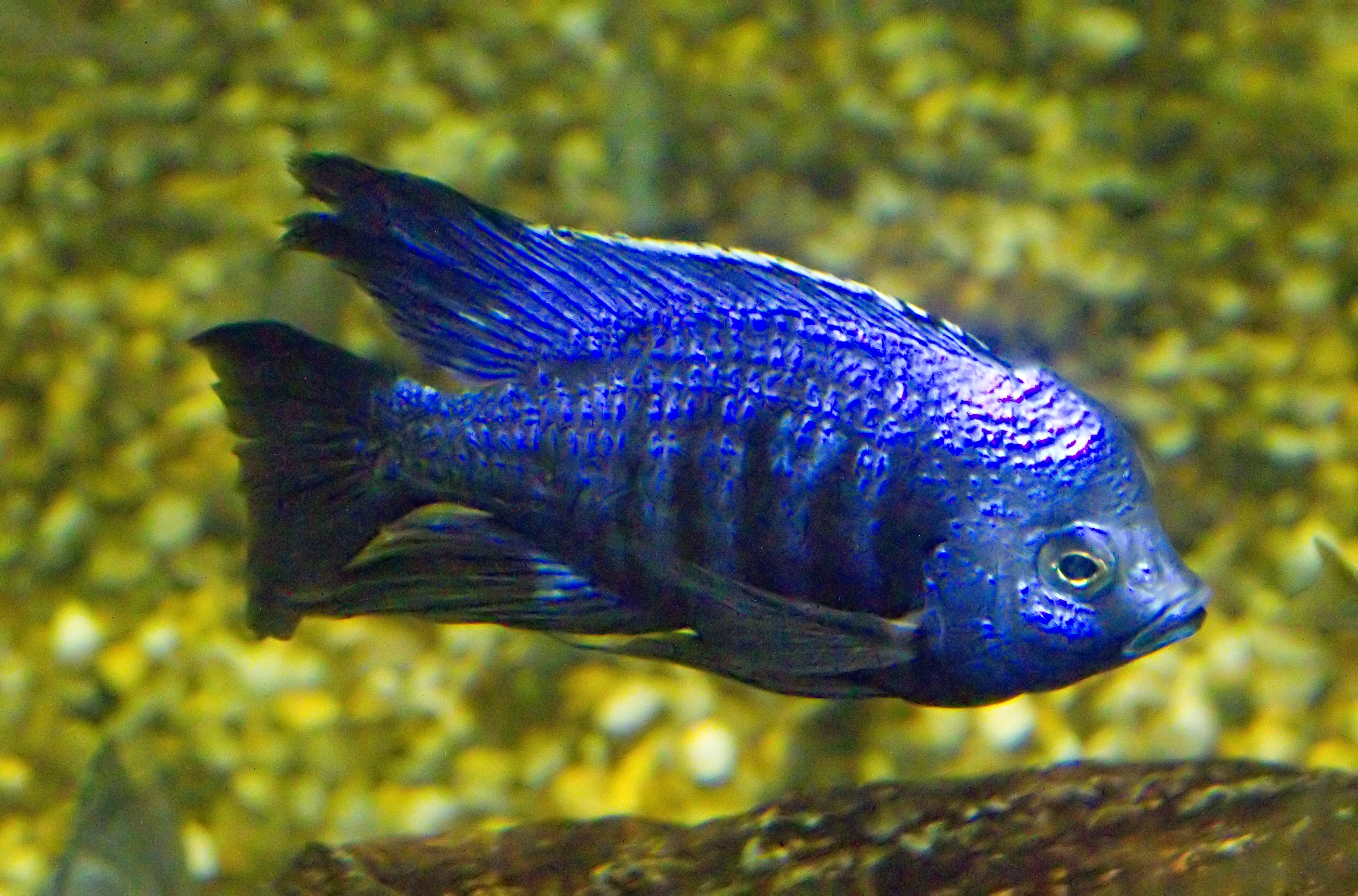
Copadichromis azureus, one of the utaka of Lake Malawi in Africa

Utaka is a term used for multiple open water-dwelling cichlid species that are found in Lake Malawi, the most diverse source of cichlids in the world of aquaria. Among others, they comprise all the members of the genera Copadichromis and Mchenga. "Utaka" apparently occupy the opposite of the niches used by the mbuna, the more common type of Malawi cichlid that dwells among rocks along the lake's fringes and bottom.

Unlike mbuna, which are generally colorful from birth, utaka tend to be very neutral in color -- mostly greys -- until they reach adulthood, because their free-swimming nature leaves them more vulnerable to predation. They are highly sexually dimorphic: the females of this informal group tend to remain bland in coloration, while the males often become spectacularly colorful, leading to common names like "peacock cichlid."

== See also ==
- List of freshwater aquarium fish species
