= Copadichromis quadrimaculatus =

Conservation status
- Least Concern (IUCN 3.1)

Scientific classification
- Kingdom: Animalia
- Phylum: Chordata
- Class: Actinopterygii
- Order: Cichliformes
- Family: Cichlidae
- Genus: Copadichromis
- Species: C. quadrimaculatus

Binomial name
- Copadichromis quadrimaculatus (Regan, 1922)

Synonyms
- Haplochromis quadrimaculatus Regan, 1922; Cyrtocara quadrimaculata (Regan, 1922)

Species of fish

Copadichromis quadrimaculatus is a species of haplochromine cichlid which is endemic to Lake Malawi. It is found throughout the lake in Malawi, Mozambique, and Tanzania.
