= Copadichromis sp. 'Virginalis Kajose' =

Conservation status
- Data Deficient (IUCN 3.1)

Scientific classification
- Kingdom: Animalia
- Phylum: Chordata
- Class: Actinopterygii
- Order: Cichliformes
- Family: Cichlidae
- Tribe: Haplochromini
- Genus: Copadichromis
- Species: C. sp. 'Virginalis Kajose'

Binomial name
- Copadichromis sp. 'Virginalis Kajose'

Species of fish

Copadichromis sp. 'Virginalis Kajose' is a formally undescribed species of freshwater fish in the family Cichlidae. It is found in Malawi, Mozambique, and Tanzania, primarily in Lake Malawi. It is also present in the adjoining, extremely shallow and recently formed Lake Malombe. It is abundant in parts of Lake Malawi and in Lake Malombe as well, in shallow waters, and has been a regionally important species for fisheries in both lakes.
