= Mylochromis anaphyrmus =

Conservation status
- Least Concern (IUCN 3.1)

Scientific classification
- Kingdom: Animalia
- Phylum: Chordata
- Class: Actinopterygii
- Order: Cichliformes
- Family: Cichlidae
- Genus: Mylochromis
- Species: M. anaphyrmus

Binomial name
- Mylochromis anaphyrmus (W. E. Burgess & H. R. Axelrod, 1973)

Synonyms
- Haplochromis anaphyrmus Burgess & Axelrod, 1973; Cyrtocara anaphyrmus (Burgess & Axelrod, 1973); Maravichromis anaphyrmus (Burgess & Axelrod, 1973)

Species of fish

Mylochromis anaphyrmus is a species of cichlid fish endemic to southern parts of Lake Malawi. It can be found at depths of around 10 to 72 metres (33–236 ft) in waters with sandy or silty substrates. It is a deep-bodied fish that differs from closely related members of the genus by having a relatively smaller and rounded head and small mouth. This species can reach a length of 23 centimetres (9.1 in) TL.

Mylochromis anaphyrmus is a predator of mollusks, principally gastropods, which it crushes with heavy molariform teeth. Examination of their guts have also revealed they feed on copepods and other arthropods.

The specific name for the species, anaphyrmus, is from the Ancient Greek word for confusion, a reference to the uncertain taxonomy of the species. This species can also be found in the aquarium trade.
