= Mchenga flavimanus =

Conservation status
- Least Concern (IUCN 3.1)

Scientific classification
- Kingdom: Animalia
- Phylum: Chordata
- Class: Actinopterygii
- Order: Cichliformes
- Family: Cichlidae
- Genus: Mchenga
- Species: M. flavimanus

Binomial name
- Mchenga flavimanus (Iles, 1960)

Synonyms
- Haplochromis flavimanus Iles, 1960; Copadichromis flavimanus (Iles, 1960); Cyrtocara flavimanus (Iles, 1960)

Species of fish

Mchenga flavimanus is a species of fish in the family Cichlidae. It is endemic to Lake Malawi.
