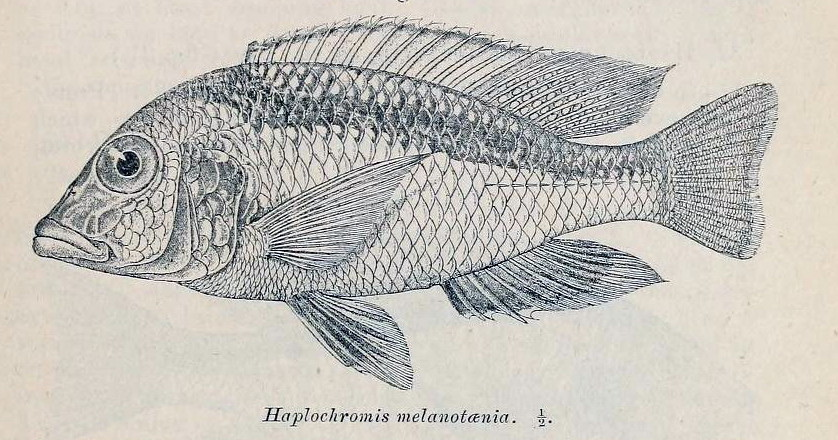

Conservation status
- Least Concern (IUCN 3.1)

Scientific classification
- Kingdom: Animalia
- Phylum: Chordata
- Class: Actinopterygii
- Order: Cichliformes
- Family: Cichlidae
- Genus: Mylochromis
- Species: M. melanotaenia

Binomial name
- Mylochromis melanotaenia (Regan,1922)

Synonyms
- Haplochromis melanotaenia Regan, 1922; Cyrtocara melanotaenia (Regan, 1922); Maravichromis melanotaenia (Regan, 1922)

= Mylochromis melanotaenia =

Species of fish

Mylochromis melanotaenia is a species of cichlid endemic to Lake Malawi where it is believed to occur only in the southern portion of the lake. It prefers sandy substrates with patches of Vallisneria. This species can reach a length of 20 centimetres (7.9 in) TL. This species can also be found in the aquarium trade.
