= Verduya's hap =

Conservation status
- Least Concern (IUCN 3.1)

Scientific classification
- Kingdom: Animalia
- Phylum: Chordata
- Class: Actinopterygii
- Order: Cichliformes
- Family: Cichlidae
- Genus: Copadichromis
- Species: C. trimaculatus

Binomial name
- Copadichromis trimaculatus (Iles, 1960)

Synonyms
- Haplochromis trimaculatus Iles, 1960; Cyrtocara trimaculata (Iles, 1960)

Species of fish

Verduya's hap (Copadichromis trimaculatus) is a species of haplochromine cichlid which is endemic to Lake Malawi. It has a lake-wide range and is thus found in Malawi, Mozambique, and Tanzania. This species occurs in open water, sometimes forming large shoals.
