= Copadichromis nkatae =

Conservation status
- Critically endangered, possibly extinct (IUCN 3.1)

Scientific classification
- Kingdom: Animalia
- Phylum: Chordata
- Class: Actinopterygii
- Order: Cichliformes
- Family: Cichlidae
- Genus: Copadichromis
- Species: C. nkatae

Binomial name
- Copadichromis nkatae (Iles, 1960)

Species of fish

Copadichromis nkatae is a species of haplochromine cichlid which is endemic to Lake Malawi. This species can be found over both rocky and sandy areas where it feeds on zooplankton, as well as phytoplankton. There have been no verified records of this species since it was described in 1960. It is exploited as a food fish and artisanal fishing using beach seines which are still widely used in the Nkhata Bay area, the only locality for this species, and these activities are the most serious threat to this species, if it is still extant.
