= Aulonocara stonemani =

Conservation status
- Least Concern (IUCN 3.1)

Scientific classification
- Kingdom: Animalia
- Phylum: Chordata
- Class: Actinopterygii
- Order: Cichliformes
- Family: Cichlidae
- Genus: Aulonocara
- Species: A. stonemani

Binomial name
- Aulonocara stonemani (W. E. Burgess & H. R. Axelrod, 1973)

Synonyms
- Placidochromis stonemani (Burgess & Axelrod, 1973)

Species of fish

Aulonocara stonemani is a species of haplochromine cichlid. It is endemic to the southeastern and southwestern arms of Lake Malawi.

Aulonocara stonemani is found in deep waters (55–80 metres (180–262 ft)), over a substrate consisting of mud or sand with sediment layer. Its diet consists of feeds on small invertebrates sifted from the sediment. The maximum total length is 6 centimetres (2.4 in). It is not considered a threatened species by the IUCN.

The specific name honours the Chief Fisheries Officer for Malawi, J. Stoneman, who helped ensure the success of the expedition the type was collected on.
