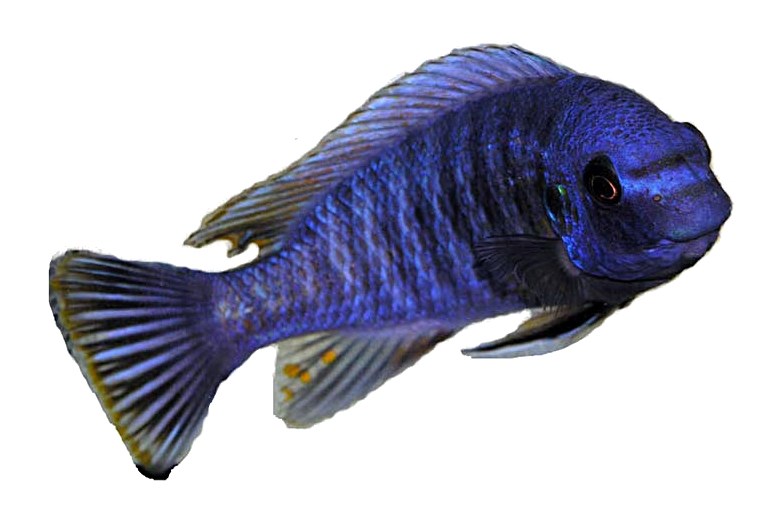

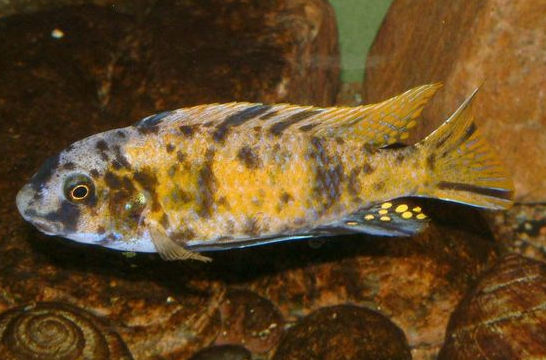
- males of typical blue morph (above) and blotched morph (below)

Conservation status
- Least Concern (IUCN 3.1)

Scientific classification
- Kingdom: Animalia
- Phylum: Chordata
- Class: Actinopterygii
- Order: Cichliformes
- Family: Cichlidae
- Genus: Labeotropheus
- Species: L. fuelleborni

Binomial name
- Labeotropheus fuelleborni Ahl, 1926

Synonyms
- Labeotropheus curvirostris Ahl, 1926

= Blue mbuna =

Species of fish

The blue mbuna (Labeotropheus fuelleborni) is a species of cichlid found in Lake Malawi where it inhabits areas with rocky substrates. This species can reach a length of 30 centimetres (12 in) SL. This species is important to local commercial fisheries as well as being found in the aquarium trade. Some of its mottled forms are sometimes known as marmalade cat.

The specific name honours the German parasitologist and military physician Friedrich Fülleborn (1866-1933).

== See also ==
- List of freshwater aquarium fish species
