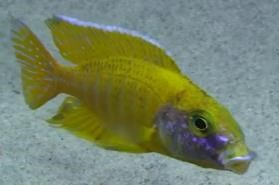

Conservation status
- Critically Endangered (IUCN 3.1)

Scientific classification
- Kingdom: Animalia
- Phylum: Chordata
- Class: Actinopterygii
- Order: Cichliformes
- Family: Cichlidae
- Genus: Aulonocara
- Species: A. baenschi

Binomial name
- Aulonocara baenschi M. K. Meyer & Riehl, 1985

= Nkhomo-benga peacock =

Species of fish

The nkhomo-benga peacock (Aulonocara baenschi), also known as the new yellow regal peacock, is a species of haplochromine cichlid which is endemic to Lake Malawi. This species is threatened by capture for the aquarium trade.

== Distribution ==
The Nkhomo-benga peacock is endemic to Lake Malawi where has only been recorded from the Nkhomo Reef and possibly nearby areas of western Lake Malawi.

== Habitat and ecology ==
Scientific Name: Aulonocara Baenschi Common Name: Yellow Sunshine PeacockAdult Size: 5 inchesLife Expectancy: 10 Years Habitat: East African Lake Malawi Minimum Tank Size: 50 Gallons Ideal Tank Conditions: Temperature Range: 78°F pH Range: 7.0-8.0 Hardness Range: 10-25° Temperament: Semi aggressive. Generally peaceful but may become territorial, particularly while spawning. Diet & Nutrition: Carnivorous - prefers live foods such as blood worms, snails or brine shrimp, but will generally accept frozen, flake or pellet foods.

The Nkhomo-benga peacock inhabits sandy areas interspersed with rocks where it hunts small invertebrates, which are detected in the sand using enlarged cephalic pores. Feeding may be by sifting the substrate in its mouth or by using a more active predatory method where it watches the substrate for movement and grabs the prey item. It is normally found in shallow waters from 2–6 metres (6.6–19.7 ft) but has been recorded as deep as 16 metres (52 ft). The males are territorial and show their breeding colour all year, the territory is centred on a shelter excavated by the male. The females live in small schools. If a female is enticed to lay eggs by the male's courtship display she will lay eggs and take them into her mouth. The males of this species has spots resembling eggs on their anal fins and the female is attracted to these, opening her egg filled mouth to attempt to swallow these "eggs", when she does the male releases his milt to inseminate the eggs in her mouth. The eggs will be mouthbrooded for four weeks before she releases the free swimming fry.

== Threats ==
The main threat to this critically endangered cichlid is capture for the aquarium trade.

== Etymology ==
The specific name honours Ulrich Baensch, the inventor of the dried flake fish food, Tetramin, and who founded Tetra GmbH.

== See also ==
- List of freshwater aquarium fish species
