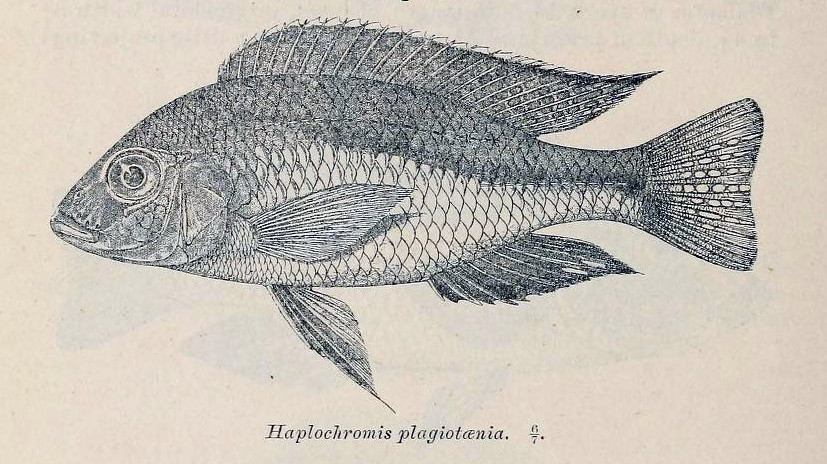

Conservation status
- Least Concern (IUCN 3.1)

Scientific classification
- Kingdom: Animalia
- Phylum: Chordata
- Class: Actinopterygii
- Order: Cichliformes
- Family: Cichlidae
- Genus: Mylochromis
- Species: M. plagiotaenia

Binomial name
- Mylochromis plagiotaenia (Regan, 1922)

Synonyms
- Haplochromis plagiotaenia Regan, 1922; Cyrtocara plagiotaenia (Regan, 1922); Maravichromis plagiotaenia (Regan, 1922)

= Mylochromis plagiotaenia =

Species of fish

Mylochromis plagiotaenia is a species of cichlid endemic to Lake Malawi where it is known from the southern arms of the lake. This species can reach a length of 11 centimetres (4.3 in) TL. This species can also be found in the aquarium trade.
