= Mchenga conophoros =

Conservation status
- Critically Endangered (IUCN 3.1)

Scientific classification
- Kingdom: Animalia
- Phylum: Chordata
- Class: Actinopterygii
- Order: Cichliformes
- Family: Cichlidae
- Genus: Mchenga
- Species: M. conophoros

Binomial name
- Mchenga conophoros (Stauffer, LoVullo & McKaye, 1993)

Synonyms
- Copadichromis conophorus Stauffer, LoVullo & McKaye, 1993

Species of fish

Mchenga conophoros is a species of fish in the family Cichlidae. It is endemic to Lake Malawi, where it has been collected around the Nankumba Peninsula in Malawi. Its natural habitat is freshwater lakes.
