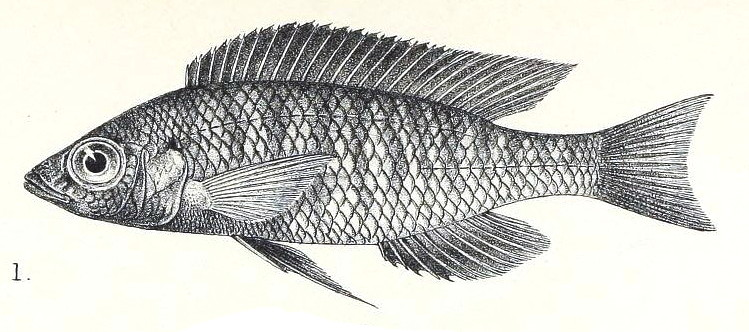

Conservation status
- Least Concern (IUCN 3.1)

Scientific classification
- Kingdom: Animalia
- Phylum: Chordata
- Class: Actinopterygii
- Order: Cichliformes
- Family: Cichlidae
- Genus: Mchenga
- Species: M. eucinostomus

Binomial name
- Mchenga eucinostomus (Regan, 1922 )

Synonyms
- Haplochromis eucinostomus Regan, 1922; Copadichromis eucinostomus (Regan, 1922); Cyrtocara eucinostoma (Regan, 1922); Cyrtocara eucinostomus (Regan, 1922); Nyassachromis eucinostomus (Regan, 1922)

= Mchenga eucinostomus =

Species of fish

Mchenga eucinostomus is a species of fish in the family Cichlidae. It is found in Malawi, Mozambique, and Tanzania. Its natural habitat is freshwater lakes.

Mchenga eucinostomus is a Lekking fish, the males build sand castles. The lek member with the tallest mound of sand – almost a meter (three feet) wide at the base – wins the females. These sandcastles take this ten-centimetre (four-inch) long animal two weeks to build.
