= Copadichromis atripinnis =

Conservation status
- Least Concern (IUCN 3.1)

Scientific classification
- Kingdom: Animalia
- Phylum: Chordata
- Class: Actinopterygii
- Order: Cichliformes
- Family: Cichlidae
- Genus: Copadichromis
- Species: C. atripinnis

Binomial name
- Copadichromis atripinnis Stauffer & Te. Sato, 2002

Species of fish

Copadichromis atripinnis is a species of fish in the family Cichlidae. It is endemic to Lake Malawi in Malawi. Its natural habitat is freshwater lakes.
