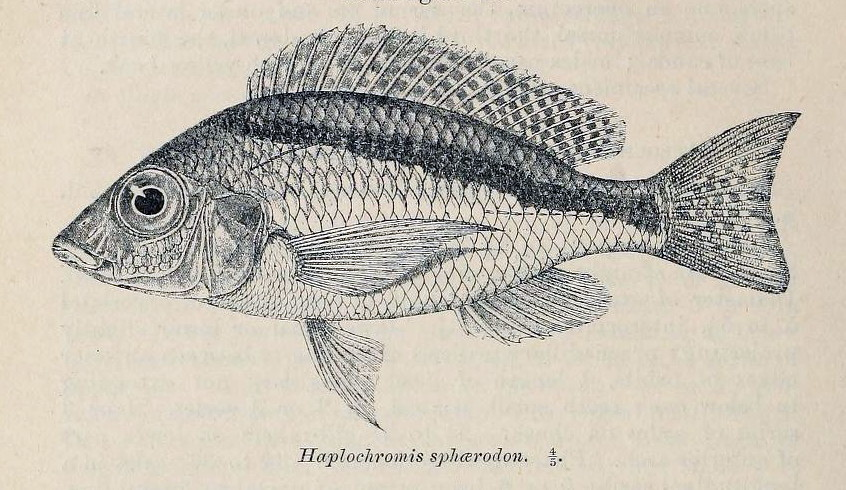

Conservation status
- Least Concern (IUCN 3.1)

Scientific classification
- Kingdom: Animalia
- Phylum: Chordata
- Class: Actinopterygii
- Order: Cichliformes
- Family: Cichlidae
- Genus: Mylochromis
- Species: M. sphaerodon

Binomial name
- Mylochromis sphaerodon (Regan, 1922)

Synonyms
- Haplochromis sphaerodon Regan, 1922; Cyrtocara sphaerodon (Regan, 1922); Maravichromis sphaerodon (Regan, 1922)

= Roundtooth hap =

Species of fish

The roundtooth hap (Mylochromis sphaerodon) is a species of cichlid endemic to Lake Malawi where it prefers shallow waters with sandy substrates. This species can reach a length of 14 centimetres (5.5 in) TL. This species can also be found in the aquarium trade.
