= Mylochromis guentheri =

Conservation status
- Least Concern (IUCN 3.1)

Scientific classification
- Kingdom: Animalia
- Phylum: Chordata
- Class: Actinopterygii
- Order: Cichliformes
- Family: Cichlidae
- Genus: Mylochromis
- Species: M. guentheri

Binomial name
- Mylochromis guentheri (Regan, 1922)

Synonyms
- Haplochromis guentheri Regan, 1922; Cyrtocara guentheri (Regan, 1922); Maravichromis guentheri (Regan, 1922)

Species of fish

Mylochromis guentheri is a species of cichlid endemic to Lake Malawi where it is found over sandy substrates. This species can reach a length of 20 centimetres (7.9 in) TL. This species can also be found in the aquarium trade. The specific name honours the German-born British zoologist, ichthyologist, and herpetologist Albert Günther (1830-1914).
