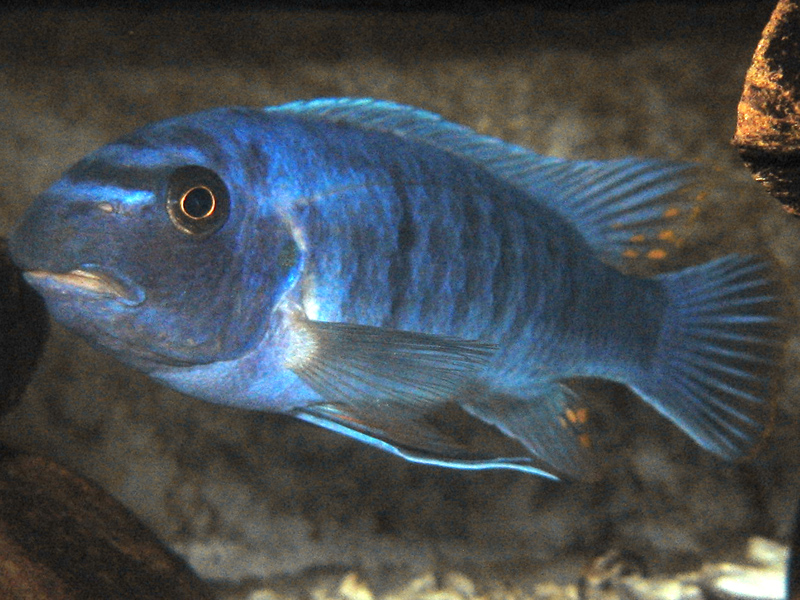

Conservation status
- Least Concern (IUCN 3.1)

Scientific classification
- Kingdom: Animalia
- Phylum: Chordata
- Class: Actinopterygii
- Order: Cichliformes
- Family: Cichlidae
- Genus: Labeotropheus
- Species: L. trewavasae

Binomial name
- Labeotropheus trewavasae Fryer, 1956

= Scrapermouth mbuna =

Species of fish

The scrapermouth mbuna (Labeotropheus trewavasae) is a species of cichlid endemic to Lake Malawi where it prefers areas with rocky substrates. This species can reach a length of 11.7 centimetres (4.6 in) TL. This species can also be found in the aquarium trade. Its specific name honours the British ichthyologist Ethelwynn Trewavas (1900-1993) of the British Museum (Natural History).
