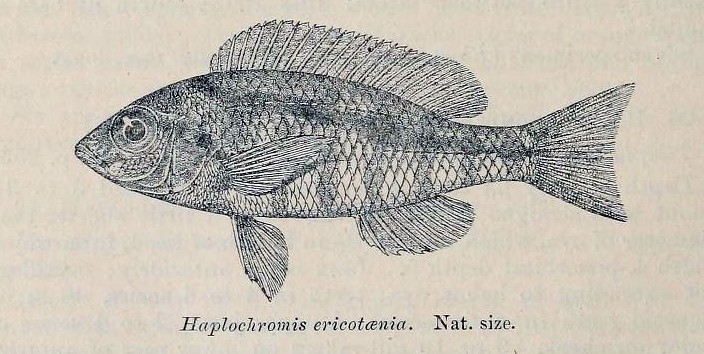

Conservation status
- Least Concern (IUCN 3.1)

Scientific classification
- Kingdom: Animalia
- Phylum: Chordata
- Class: Actinopterygii
- Order: Cichliformes
- Family: Cichlidae
- Genus: Mylochromis
- Species: M. ericotaenia

Binomial name
- Mylochromis ericotaenia (Regan, 1922)

Synonyms
- Haplochromis ericotaenia Regan, 1922; Cyrtocara ericotaenia (Regan, 1922); Maravichromis ericotaenia (Regan, 1922)

= Mylochromis ericotaenia =

Species of fish

Mylochromis ericotaenia is a species of cichlid endemic to Lake Malawi where it prefers areas with sandy substrates. This species can reach a length of 20.6 centimetres (8.1 in) TL. This species can also be found in the aquarium trade.
