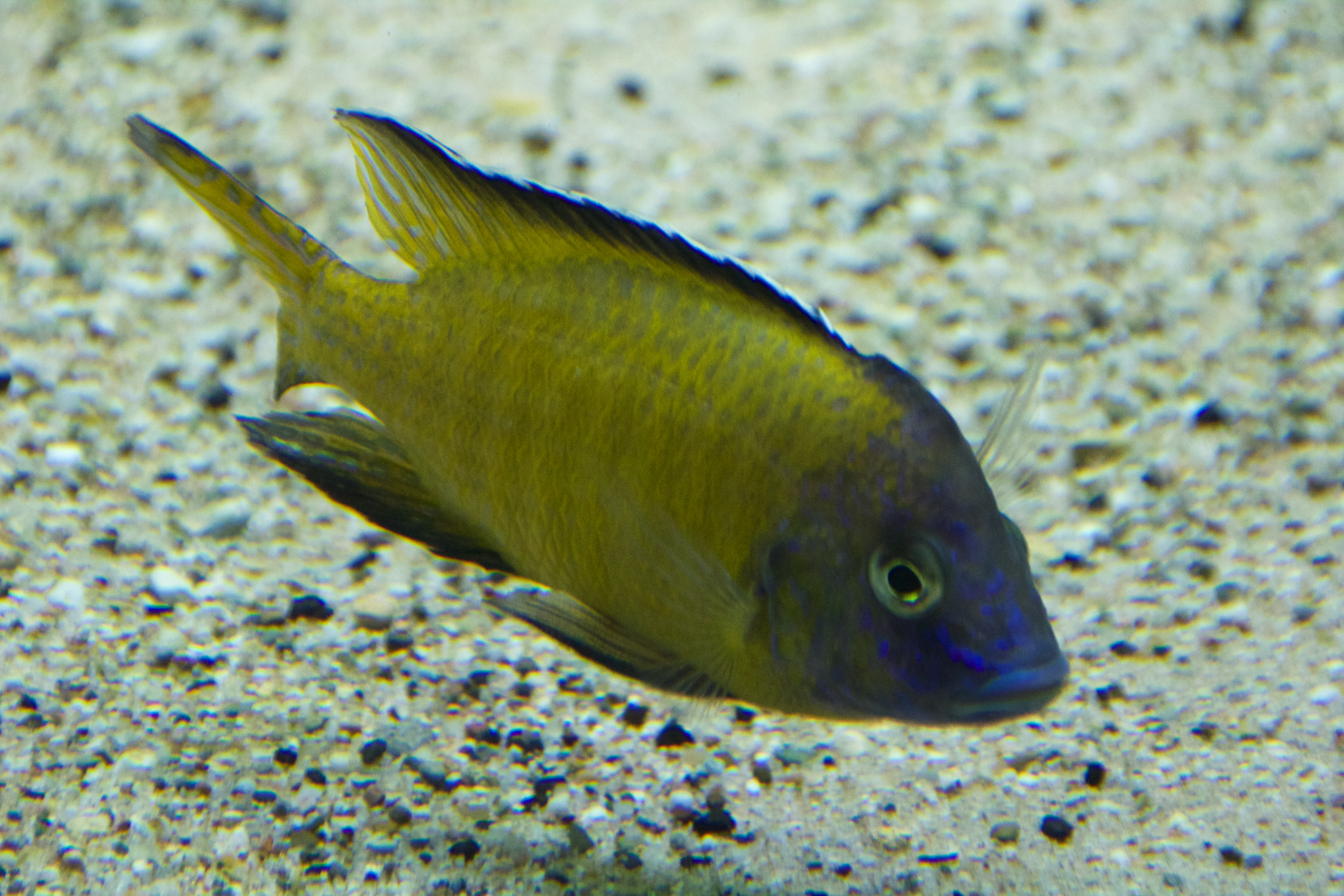

Conservation status
- Least Concern (IUCN 3.1)

Scientific classification
- Kingdom: Animalia
- Phylum: Chordata
- Class: Actinopterygii
- Order: Cichliformes
- Family: Cichlidae
- Genus: Aulonocara
- Species: A. stuartgranti

Binomial name
- Aulonocara stuartgranti M. K. Meyer & Riehl, 1985

Synonyms
- Aulonocara steveni Meyer, Riehl & Zetzsche, 1987; Aulonocara hansbaenschi Meyer, Riehl & Zetzsche, 1987

= Flavescent peacock =

Species of fish

The flavescent peacock (Aulonocara stuartgranti), also known as Grant's peacock, is a species of haplochromine cichlid. Its common name refers to its "flavescent" (yellowish) colour.

It is endemic to Lake Malawi where found in the countries of in Malawi, Mozambique, and Tanzania.

The species Aulonocara steveni and A. hansbaenschi are treated as junior synonyms of A. stuartgranti by the IUCN and the Catalog of Fishes, but FishBase treat it as a valid species.

The specific name honours Stuart M. Grant (1937-2007), an exporter of cichlids from lake Malawi for the aquarium trade.
