= Mylochromis mola =

Mola hap

Conservation status
- Least Concern (IUCN 3.1)

Scientific classification
- Kingdom: Animalia
- Phylum: Chordata
- Class: Actinopterygii
- Order: Cichliformes
- Family: Cichlidae
- Genus: Mylochromis
- Species: M. mola

Binomial name
- Mylochromis mola (Trewavas, 1935)

Synonyms
- Haplochromis mola Trewavas, 1935; Cyrtocara mola (Trewavas, 1935); Maravichromis mola (Trewavas, 1935)

Species of fish

Mylochromis mola (mola hap) is a species of cichlid endemic to Lake Malawi. This species can reach a length of 18 centimetres (7.1 in) TL. This species can also be found in the aquarium trade.
