= Mchenga cyclicos =

Conservation status
- Near Threatened (IUCN 3.1)

Scientific classification
- Kingdom: Animalia
- Phylum: Chordata
- Class: Actinopterygii
- Order: Cichliformes
- Family: Cichlidae
- Genus: Mchenga
- Species: M. cyclicos

Binomial name
- Mchenga cyclicos (Stauffer, LoVullo & McKaye, 1993)

Synonyms
- Copadichromis cyclicos Stauffer, LoVullo & McKaye, 1993

Species of fish

Mchenga cyclicos is a species of fish in the family Cichlidae. It is endemic to Lake Malawi, where it has been collected near the Nankumba Peninsula of Malawi. Its natural habitat is freshwater lakes.
