= Copadichromis virginalis =

Conservation status
- Near Threatened (IUCN 3.1)

Scientific classification
- Kingdom: Animalia
- Phylum: Chordata
- Class: Actinopterygii
- Order: Cichliformes
- Family: Cichlidae
- Genus: Copadichromis
- Species: C. virginalis

Binomial name
- Copadichromis virginalis (Iles, 1960)

Synonyms
- Haplochromis virginalis Iles, 1960; Cyrtocara virginalis (Iles, 1960)

Species of fish

Copadichromis virginalis is a species of haplochromine cichlid, which is endemic to Lake Malawi the upper Shire River and to Lake Malombe. It is found in Malawi, Mozambique, and Tanzania. The population has shown signs of a severe decline and is under pressure from overfishing for food, in 2018 this led to the IUCN changing its status from Data Deficient to Near Threatened.

The form which occurs outside Lake Malawi does not breed in rocky areas whereas those in Lake Malawi use a rock habitat, these may be different species.
