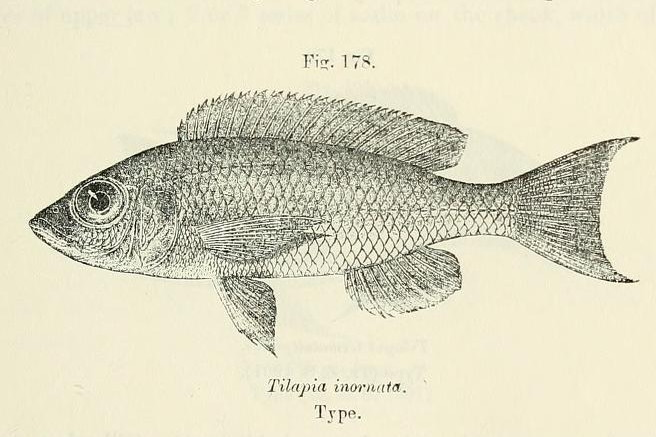

Conservation status
- Data Deficient (IUCN 3.1)

Scientific classification
- Kingdom: Animalia
- Phylum: Chordata
- Class: Actinopterygii
- Order: Cichliformes
- Family: Cichlidae
- Genus: Mchenga
- Species: M. inornata

Binomial name
- Mchenga inornata (Boulenger, 1908)

Synonyms
- Tilapia inornata Boulenger, 1908; Copadichromis inornatus (Boulenger, 1908); Cyrtocara inornata (Boulenger, 1908); Haplochromis inornatus (Boulenger, 1908)

= Mchenga inornata =

Species of fish

Mchenga inornata is a species of fish in the family Cichlidae. It is endemic to Lake Malawi in Malawi. Its natural habitat is freshwater lakes.
