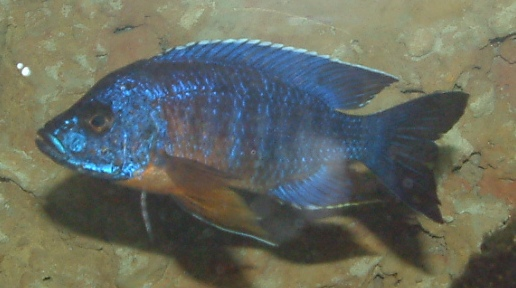

Conservation status
- Vulnerable (IUCN 3.1)

Scientific classification
- Kingdom: Animalia
- Phylum: Chordata
- Class: Actinopterygii
- Order: Cichliformes
- Family: Cichlidae
- Genus: Aulonocara
- Species: A. hansbaenschi

Binomial name
- Aulonocara hansbaenschi M. K. Meyer, Riehl & Zetzsche, 1987

= Fort Maguire aulonocara =

Species of fish

The Fort Maguire aulonocara (Aulonocara hansbaenschi), also known as Aulonocara 'Fort Maguire' in the aquarium fish trade, is a species of haplochromine cichlid endemic to Lake Malawi.

It is found in Malawi and Mozambique. Its natural habitat is freshwater lakes. This species is treated as junior synonym of Aulonocara stuartgranti by the IUCN and the Catalog of Fishes, but FishBase treat it as a valid species.
