= Copadichromis likomae =

Conservation status
- Least Concern (IUCN 3.1)

Scientific classification
- Kingdom: Animalia
- Phylum: Chordata
- Class: Actinopterygii
- Order: Cichliformes
- Family: Cichlidae
- Genus: Copadichromis
- Species: C. likomae

Binomial name
- Copadichromis likomae (Iles,1960)

Synonyms
- Haplochromis likomae Iles, 1960; Cyrtocara likomae (Iles, 1960)

Species of fish

Copadichromis likomae is a species of haplochromine cichlid which is endemic to Lake Malawi. It forms schools and feeds on zooplankton.
