= Molas =

Molas may refer to:

- Molas, France, a commune in the Haute-Garonne department
- Molas Pass, a high mountain pass in the San Juan Mountains of western Colorado in the United States
- Isidre Molas (born 1940), a Catalan politician
- Felipe Molas López (1901–1954), a President of Paraguay in 1949
- Molas, plural of mola (fish)

MOLAS may refer to:

- Museum of London Archaeology Service (MoLAS), a self-financing part of the Museum of London Group, providing a wide range of professional archaeological services to clients in London, SE England, the UK and internationally

== See also ==
- Mola (disambiguation)
- Moles (disambiguation)
- Molass (disambiguation)
- Molasse
- Mollas (disambiguation)
