= Chitande aulonocara =

Conservation status
- Near Threatened (IUCN 3.1)

Scientific classification
- Kingdom: Animalia
- Phylum: Chordata
- Class: Actinopterygii
- Order: Cichliformes
- Family: Cichlidae
- Genus: Aulonocara
- Species: A. ethelwynnae

Binomial name
- Aulonocara ethelwynnae M. K. Meyer, Riehl & Zetzsche, 1987

Species of fish

The Chitande aulonocara (Aulonocara ethelwynnae) is a species of haplochromine cichlid which is endemic to Lake Malawi, only occurring in the north-west of the Lake near Chitande Island. It occurs over habitats of mixed rock and sand and it feeds on benthic invertebrates. The males show territorial behaviour all year and defend their territories from other males. These territorial males are found in deeper areas around 15 metres (49 ft) while the non territorial males and the females are rarely seen below 3 metres (9.8 ft). Ripe females descend towards the males and spawning takes place in a cavity or, if the male's territory does not include a cavity, on the open sand. The specific name honours the British ichthyologist Ethelwynn Trewavas (1900–1993) of the British Museum (Natural History) who described a number of species of cichlid from Lake Malawi.
