= Aulonocara guentheri =

Conservation status
- Endangered (IUCN 3.1)

Scientific classification
- Kingdom: Animalia
- Phylum: Chordata
- Class: Actinopterygii
- Order: Cichliformes
- Family: Cichlidae
- Genus: Aulonocara
- Species: A. guentheri

Binomial name
- Aulonocara guentheri Eccles, 1989

Species of fish

Aulonocara guentheri is a species of haplochromine cichlid endemic to Lake Malawi, where they are restricted to the south eastern arm, and Lake Malombe, meaning that as far as is known this fish is endemic to Malawi. It prefers shallow sandy habitat where it forages in small schools, males in breeding colours have been caught by fishermen in November and December suggesting that is when they breed. The specific name honours the German born British herpetologist and ichthyologist Albert Günther (1830-1914), who was one of the first scientists to recognise the diversity of te cichlids in Lake Malawi.
