= Molass =

Molass may be:

- the older name of Holy Island, Firth of Clyde, an island in Scotland
- a rare American English term for molasses
  - an old word for a type of liquor made from molasses

== See also ==
- Molasse, a type of rock deposit
- Molas (disambiguation)
- Mollas (disambiguation)
