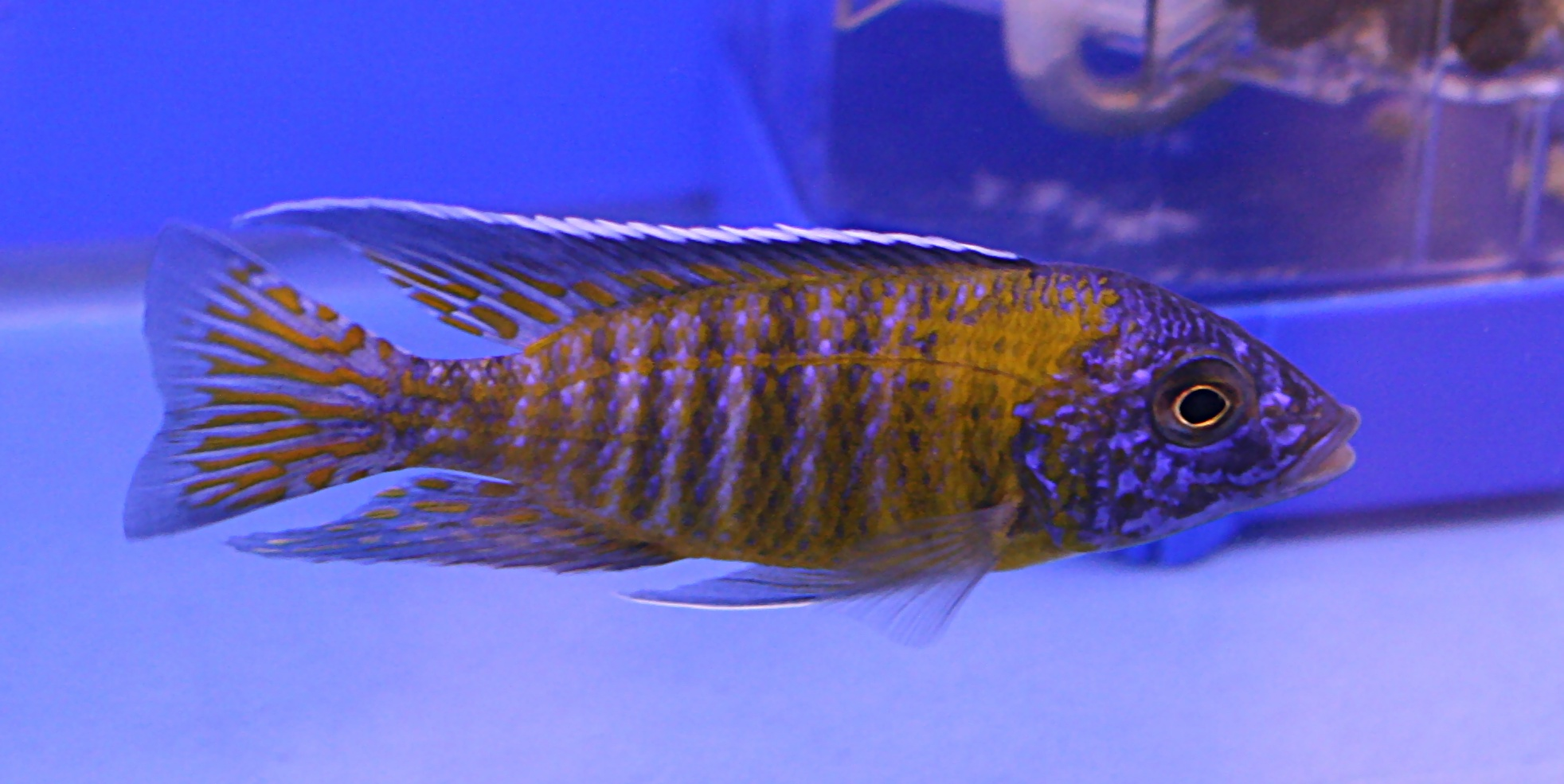

Conservation status
- Vulnerable (IUCN 3.1)

Scientific classification
- Kingdom: Animalia
- Phylum: Chordata
- Class: Actinopterygii
- Order: Cichliformes
- Family: Cichlidae
- Genus: Aulonocara
- Species: A. steveni

Binomial name
- Aulonocara steveni M. K. Meyer, Riehl & Zetzsche, 1987

= Pale Usisya aulonocara =

Species of fish

The pale Usisya aulonocara (Aulonocara steveni) is a putative species of haplochromine cichlid endemic to Lake Malawi.

It is endemic to Malawi. Its natural habitat is freshwater lakes. This species is treated as junior synonym of Aulonocara stuartgranti by the IUCN and the Catalog of Fishes, but FishBase treat it as a valid species.
