= Mola =

Mola can refer to:

== Places ==
- La Mola, Formentera, Balearic Islands, Spain
- Lake Mola, a lake near Ilirska Bistrica, Inner Carniola region, Slovenia
- Mola di Bari, or simply Mola, a city in Apulia, Southern Italy

== Mountains ==
- Mola de Colldejou, a mountain chain in Catalonia, Spain
- Mola dels Quatre Termes, a mountain in Catalonia, Spain
- Mola del Guerxet, a mountain in Catalonia, Spain
- Mola Gran, a mountain in the Valencian Community, Spain
- Mola de Llaberia, a mountain in Catalonia, Spain

== Museums ==
- Museum of the Living Artist (MoLA), an exhibition of works by San Diego artists
- Museum of London Archaeology (MOLA), an archaeological organisation and charity (formerly part of the Museum of London)
- Museum of Living Art (MOLA), an exhibition at Fort Worth Zoo, US

== People ==
- Mola Ram (1743–1833), Indian painter
- Mola Sylla (born 1956), Senegalese musician
- Carlos Loret de Mola (born 1976), Mexican journalist
- Carlos Loret de Mola Mediz (1921–1986), Mexican politician and journalist
- Carmen Mola, 2020s pseudonymous Spanish novelist
- Emilio Mola (1887–1937), Spanish army officer of the Spanish Civil War
- Pasquale Mola (fl. 1908), Italian biologist who proposed the Sardinian lynx
- Pier Francesco Mola (1612–1666), Italian painter

== Other ==
- Mola (art form), the textile art form of the Kuna people of Panama and Colombia
- Mola (fish), a genus of fish in the family Molidae
  - Ocean sunfish, Mola mola or common mola
- Mola (streaming service), a streaming service based in Indonesia
- Mola Ram (Indiana Jones character), the main antagonist in Indiana Jones and the Temple of Doom
- Mars Orbiter Laser Altimeter, an instrument on the Mars Global Surveyor orbiter
- Ministry of Legal Affairs, the Ministry of Legal Affairs in the Sultanate of Oman
- a Latin word which is the origin of the word molar

== See also ==
- MOLAA, the Museum of Latin American Art, Long Beach, California
- Molas (disambiguation)
- Moles (disambiguation)
