= Copadichromis cyaneus =

Conservation status
- Least Concern (IUCN 3.1)

Scientific classification
- Kingdom: Animalia
- Phylum: Chordata
- Class: Actinopterygii
- Order: Cichliformes
- Family: Cichlidae
- Genus: Copadichromis
- Species: C. cyaneus

Binomial name
- Copadichromis cyaneus (Trewavas, 1935)

Synonyms
- Haplochromis cyaneus Trewavas, 1935; Cyrtocara cyanea (Trewavas, 1935)

Species of fish

Copadichromis cyaneus is a species of fish in the family Cichlidae. It is found in Malawi, Mozambique, and Tanzania. Its natural habitat is freshwater lakes.
