= Copadichromis mloto =

Conservation status
- Data Deficient (IUCN 3.1)

Scientific classification
- Kingdom: Animalia
- Phylum: Chordata
- Class: Actinopterygii
- Order: Cichliformes
- Family: Cichlidae
- Genus: Copadichromis
- Species: C. mloto

Binomial name
- Copadichromis mloto (Iles, 1960)

Species of fish

Copadichromis mloto is a species of haplochromine cichlid which is endemic to Lake Malawi.
