= Aulonocara aquilonium =

Conservation status
- Least Concern (IUCN 3.1)

Scientific classification
- Kingdom: Animalia
- Phylum: Chordata
- Class: Actinopterygii
- Order: Cichliformes
- Family: Cichlidae
- Genus: Aulonocara
- Species: A. aquilonium

Binomial name
- Aulonocara aquilonium Konings, 1995

Species of fish

Aulonocara aquilonium is a species of fish in the family Cichlidae. It is endemic to Malawi. Its natural habitat is freshwater lakes where it occurs in areas of sandy substrate where mature males defend a small territory of sand against other mature males of this species. The foraging females and non-breeding males form large schools. It is found at depths ranging from 12–25 metres (39–82 ft). During the months of November and December A. aquilonium is abundant where there is an interface between rock and sandy habitats near Mdoka on the northwestern shores of Lake Malawi
