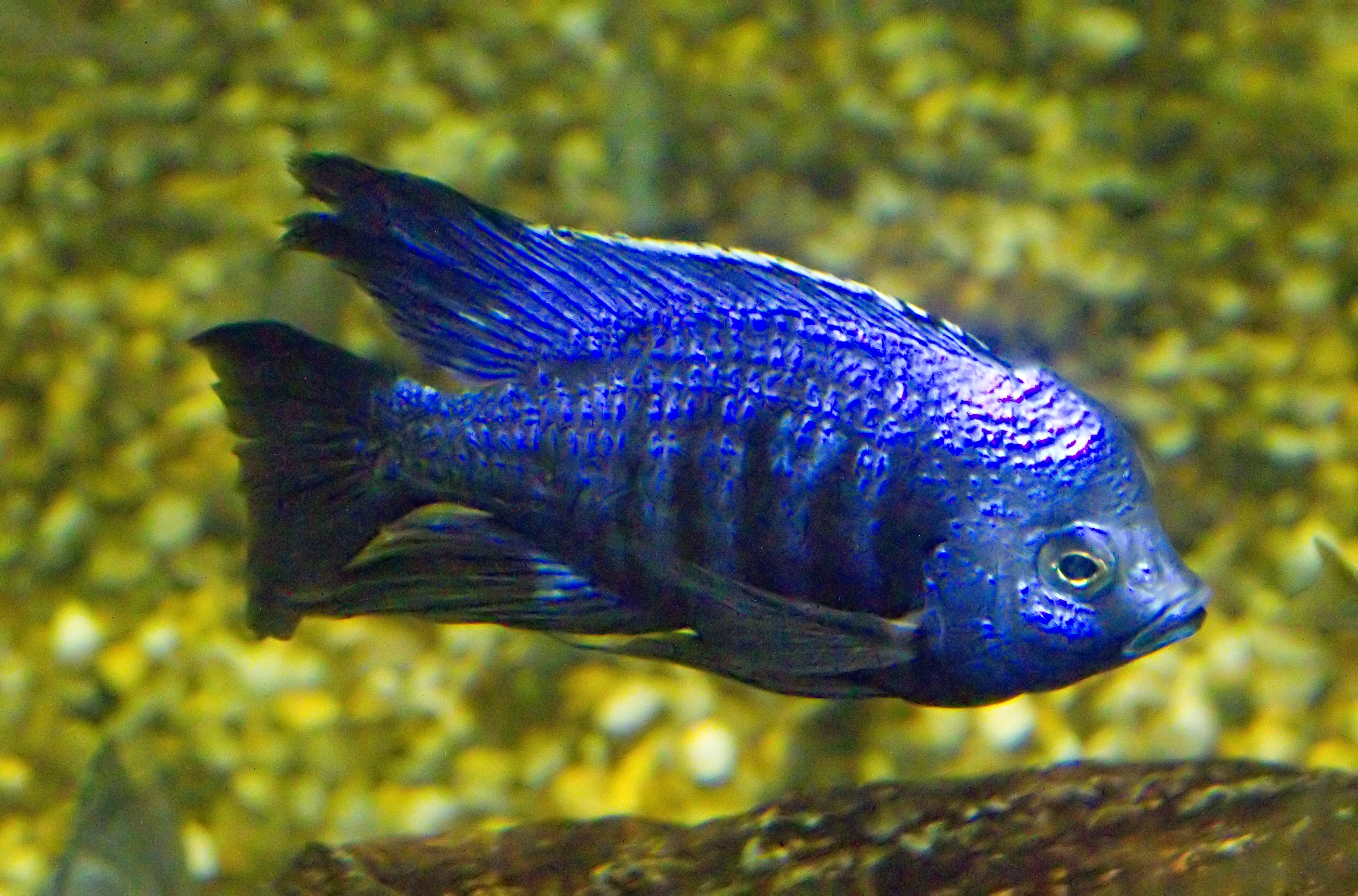

Conservation status
- Near Threatened (IUCN 3.1)

Scientific classification
- Kingdom: Animalia
- Phylum: Chordata
- Class: Actinopterygii
- Order: Cichliformes
- Family: Cichlidae
- Genus: Copadichromis
- Species: C. azureus

Binomial name
- Copadichromis azureus Konings, 1990

= Copadichromis azureus =

Azureus Cichlid

Species of fish

Copadichromis azureus, known as the azureus cichlid, is a species of haplochromine cichlid. It is endemic to Lake Malawi where it is found in the country of Malawi.
