= Greenface aulonocara =

Conservation status
- Least Concern (IUCN 3.1)

Scientific classification
- Kingdom: Animalia
- Phylum: Chordata
- Class: Actinopterygii
- Order: Cichliformes
- Family: Cichlidae
- Genus: Aulonocara
- Species: A. saulosi

Binomial name
- Aulonocara saulosi M. K. Meyer, Riehl & Zetzsche, 1987

Species of fish

The greenface aulonocara (Aulonocara saulosi) is a species of haplochromine cichlid which is endemic to Lake Malawi.

It is found in Malawi and Tanzania, is widespread in Lake Malawi but is nowhere common and it is threatened by collection for the aquarium trade.

The specific name honours Saulos Mwale, of Salima, Malawi, who worked as a diver and mechanic for the cichlid exporter Stuart M. Grant and who discovered a number of Malawian cichlids.
