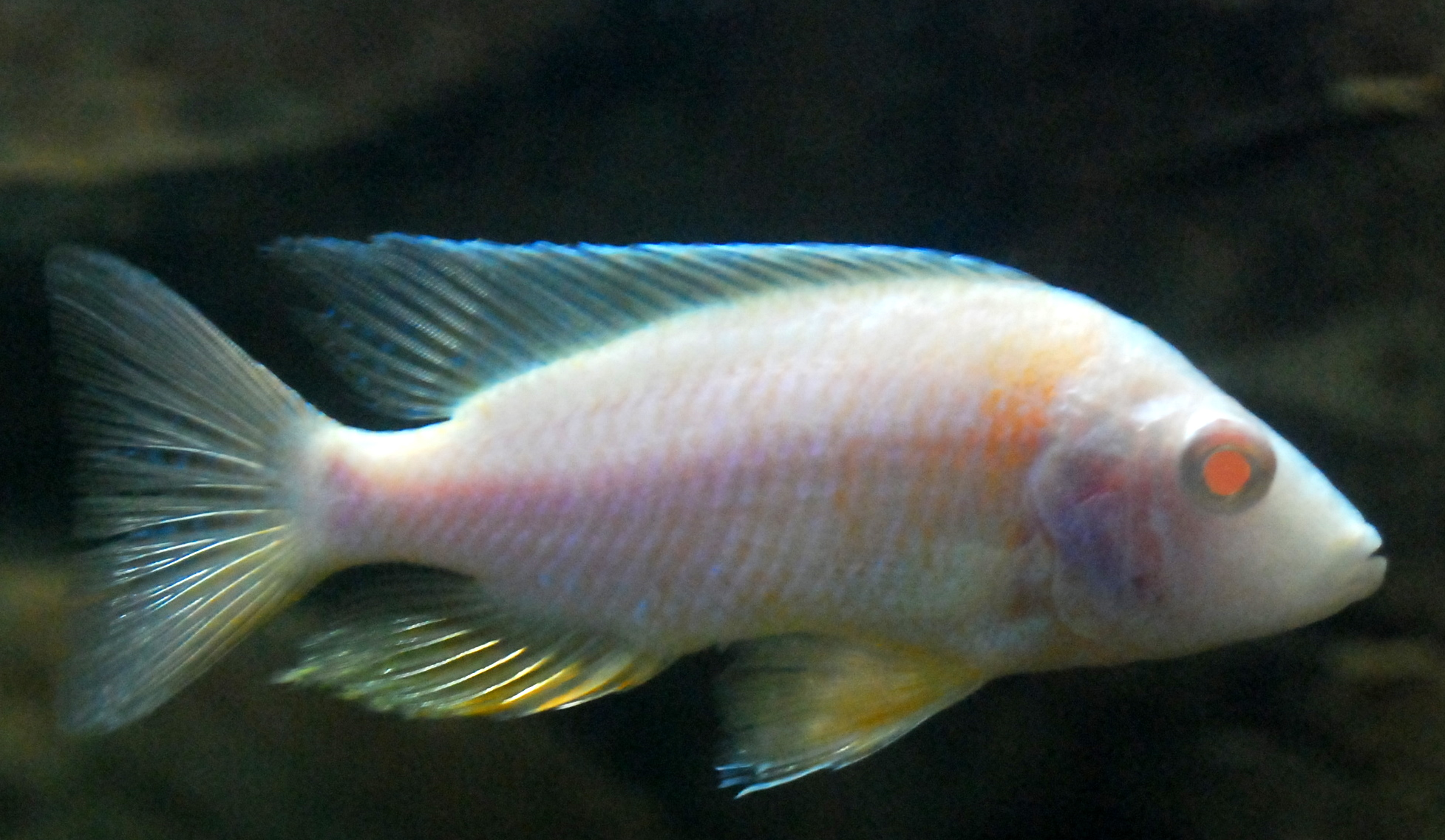

Conservation status
- Near Threatened (IUCN 3.1)

Scientific classification
- Kingdom: Animalia
- Phylum: Chordata
- Class: Actinopterygii
- Order: Cichliformes
- Family: Cichlidae
- Genus: Aulonocara
- Species: A. nyassae

Binomial name
- Aulonocara nyassae Regan, 1922

= Aulonocara nyassae =

Species of fish

Aulonocara nyassae, known as the emperor cichlid, is a species of haplochromine Cichlid that is endemic to Lake Malawi in Africa. It has been recorded from the southeastern arm of the lake and may be present in the southwestern arm. This species was known only from its holotype, which was collected at the turn of the century, until more specimens were collected in the 1990s.

== Sources ==
Data related to Aulonocara nyassae at Wikispecies
