= Copadichromis jacksoni =

Conservation status
- Least Concern (IUCN 3.1)

Scientific classification
- Kingdom: Animalia
- Phylum: Chordata
- Class: Actinopterygii
- Order: Cichliformes
- Family: Cichlidae
- Genus: Copadichromis
- Species: C. jacksoni

Binomial name
- Copadichromis jacksoni (Iles, 1960)

Synonyms
- Haplochromis jacksoni Iles, 1960; Cyrtocara jacksoni (Iles, 1960)

Species of fish

Copadichromis jacksoni is a species of haplochromine cichlid which is endemic to Lake Malawi. This species normally occurs in sheltered bays where it lives in schools in the open water and feeds on plankton. It breeds in clear water where there are steep, rocky shores and breeding seems to occur all year. The males defend territories over large boulders which project from the rocky substrate. The identity of the person honoured in the specific name was not specified by the author but is most likely to be the ichthyologist Peter B. N. Jackson (1924–2007) of the Joint Fisheries Research Organisation of Northern Rhodesia and Nyasaland.
