= Mchenga thinos =

Conservation status
- Least Concern (IUCN 3.1)

Scientific classification
- Kingdom: Animalia
- Phylum: Chordata
- Class: Actinopterygii
- Order: Cichliformes
- Family: Cichlidae
- Genus: Mchenga
- Species: M. thinos

Binomial name
- Mchenga thinos Stauffer, LoVullo & McKaye, 1993

Synonyms
- Copadichromis thinos Stauffer, LoVullo & McKaye, 1993

Species of fish

Mchenga thinos is a species of fish in the family Cichlidae. It is endemic to Lake Malawi, where it is distributed lake-wide. Its natural habitat is freshwater lakes.
