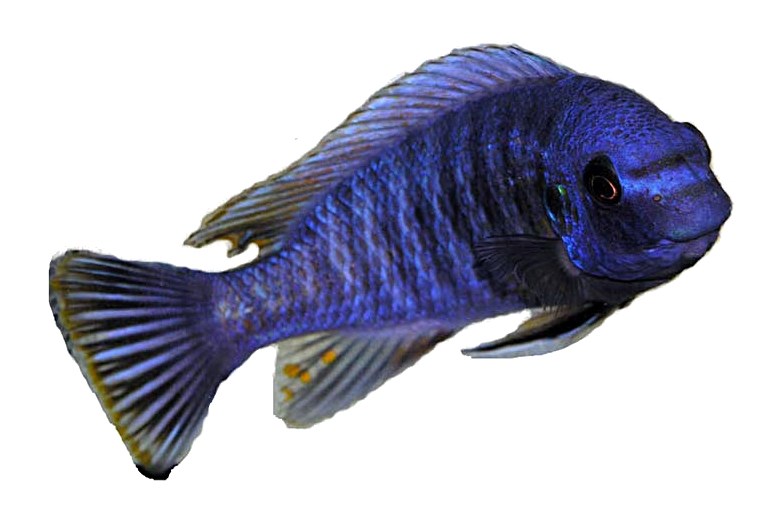
- Labeotropheus fuelleborni Blue morph
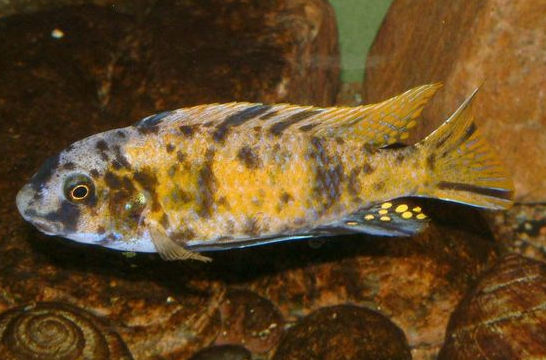
- Labeotropheus fuelleborni blotched morph

Scientific classification
- Kingdom: Animalia
- Phylum: Chordata
- Class: Actinopterygii
- Order: Cichliformes
- Family: Cichlidae
- Tribe: Haplochromini
- Genus: Labeotropheus; C. G. E. Ahl, 1926

Type species
- Labeotropheus fuelleborni Ahl, 1926

= Labeotropheus =

Labeotropheus fuelleborni

Genus of fishes

Labeotropheus is a genus of fish in the family Cichlidae endemic to Lake Malawi in eastern Africa. It includes at least 11 species, each with a number of subspecies or races. Further taxonomic work is required to determine how many species exist. These cichlids are popular ornamental fish and are ideally suited to the cichlid aquarium. Like many Malawi cichlids, these species are algal grazers. Like all cichlids from Lake Malawi these cichlids are best maintained in hard, alkaline water. This genus are best kept in aquariums with volumes greater than 120 L (31.5 gallon). The aquarium should be decorated with rocks, although caves can also be easily created from terracotta pots.

== Species ==
There are currently 11 recognized species in this genus, including:

- Labeotropheus alticodia Pauers & T. B. Phiri, 2023
- Labeotropheus artatorostris Pauers 2017
- Labeotropheus aurantinfra Pauers & Phiri, 2023
- Labeotropheus candipygia Pauers & Phiri, 2023
- Labeotropheus chirangali Pauers & Phiri, 2023
- Labeotropheus chlorosiglos Pauers, 2016
- Labeotropheus fuelleborni C. G. E. Ahl, 1926
- Labeotropheus obscurus Pauers & Phiri, 2023
- Labeotropheus rubidorsalis Pauers & Phiri, 2023
- Labeotropheus simoneae Pauers, 2016
- Labeotropheus trewavasae Fryer, 1956
