= Aulonocara koningsi =

Conservation status
- Least Concern (IUCN 3.1)

Scientific classification
- Kingdom: Animalia
- Phylum: Chordata
- Class: Actinopterygii
- Order: Cichliformes
- Family: Cichlidae
- Genus: Aulonocara
- Species: A. koningsi

Binomial name
- Aulonocara koningsi Tawil, 2003

Species of fish

Aulonocara koningsi is a species of haplochromine cichlid which is endemic to Lake Malawi. It is restricted to the waters around Mbenji Island and is therefore endemic to Malawi too. It is common in the restricted area in which it occurs but collection for the aquarium trade does not seem to have affected the population.

This species has a rounded back. The territorial males are uniformly blue with the egg spots normally shown by the males of the genus Aulonocara on the anal fin being either absent or greatly reduced. Females and non-territorial males are marked with dark vertical bars which often connect on the belly, they also have spots on their flanks.

Aulonocara koningsi is found in the intermediate zone between areas of rocks and sandy substrates at depths of 3–25 metres (9.8–82.0 ft). These fish feed from the patches of sand which intersperse the rocks. The males excavate holes under the rocks and they defend a small territory while the females occur in small groups numbering 4–5.

The specific name honours the ichthyologist Ad Konings in recognition of his contribution to the study of Lake Malawi's cichlids.
