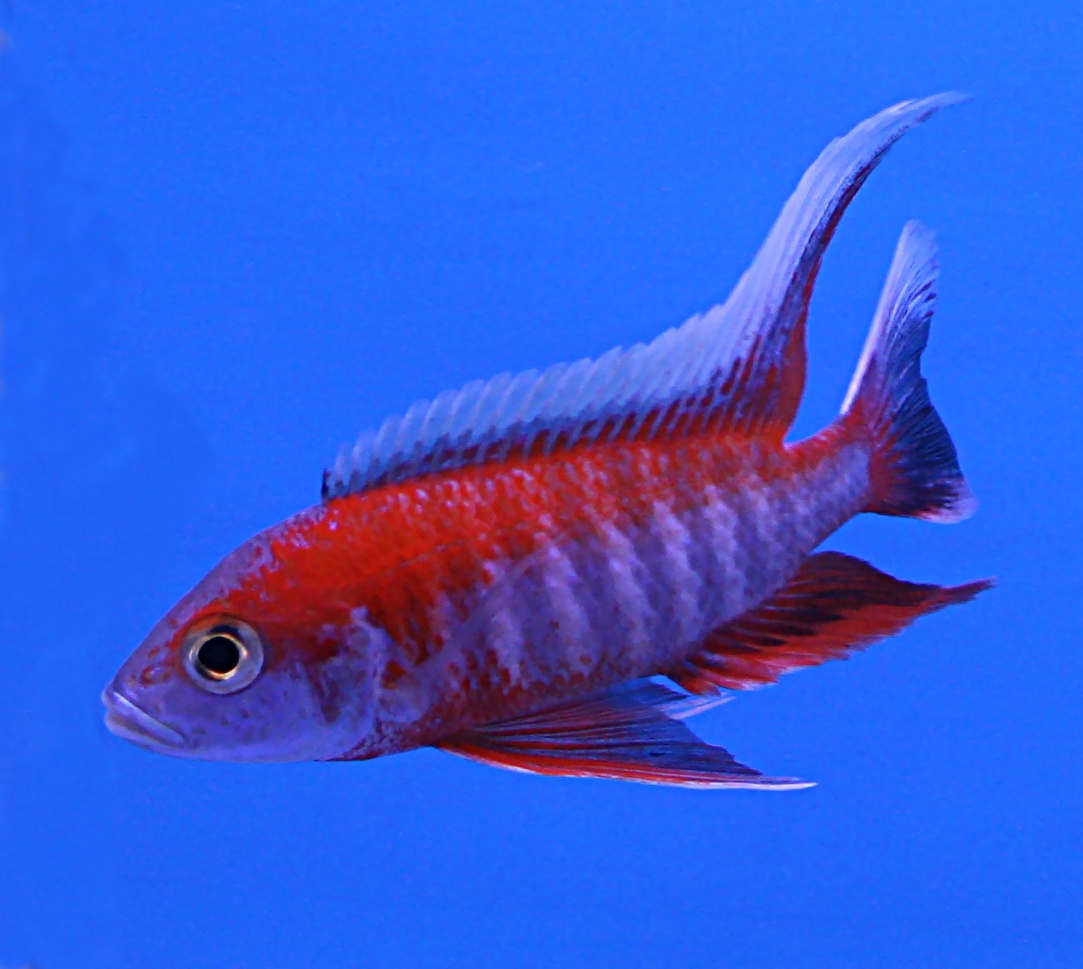
- Red morph

Conservation status
- Least Concern (IUCN 3.1)

Scientific classification
- Kingdom: Animalia
- Phylum: Chordata
- Class: Actinopterygii
- Order: Cichliformes
- Family: Cichlidae
- Genus: Aulonocara
- Species: A. jacobfreibergi

Binomial name
- Aulonocara jacobfreibergi (D. S. Johnson, 1974)

= Aulonocara jacobfreibergi =

Eureka red peacock

Species of fish

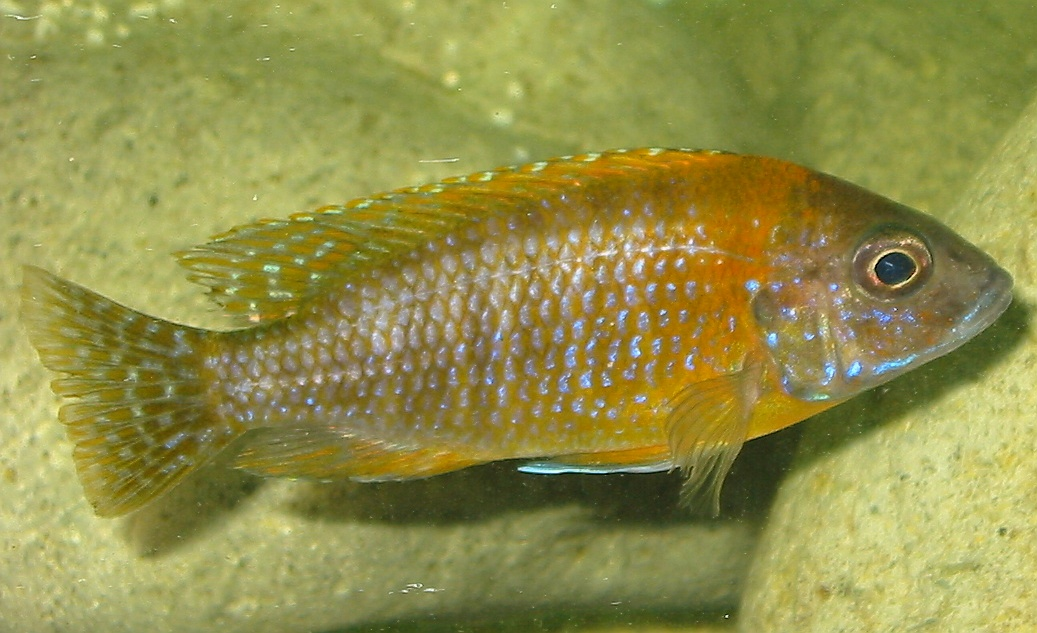
Yellow morph

Aulonocara jacobfreibergi, the eureka red peacock, is a species of fish in the family Cichlidae. It is also known as Freiberg's peacock or fairy cichlid. There are several colour morphs including red or yellow. They generally can grow to around 15 cm in length.

It is endemic to Malawi where it has been observed at Nkudzi, Monkey Bay, Nankumba, Domwe Islands and Otter Point in Lake Malawi.

The specific name honours the fish importer Jacob Freiberg of Verona, New Jersey who was the co-collector of the type.

== See also ==
- List of freshwater aquarium fish species
