= Aulonocara korneliae =

Conservation status
- Least Concern (IUCN 3.1)

Scientific classification
- Kingdom: Animalia
- Phylum: Chordata
- Class: Actinopterygii
- Division: Teleostei
- Order: Cichliformes
- Family: Cichlidae
- Genus: Aulonocara
- Species: A. korneliae

Binomial name
- Aulonocara korneliae M. K. Meyer, Riehl & Zetzsche, 1987

Species of fish

Aulonocara korneliae, known in the aquarium fish trade as the Aulonocara Chizumulu, Aulonocara blue gold or blue orchard Aulonocara, is a species of haplochromine cichlid.

It is endemic to Lake Malawi in East Africa, and only known from around the Chizumulu Island.

The specific name honours the wife of Manfred K. Meyer, Kornelia Meyer.
