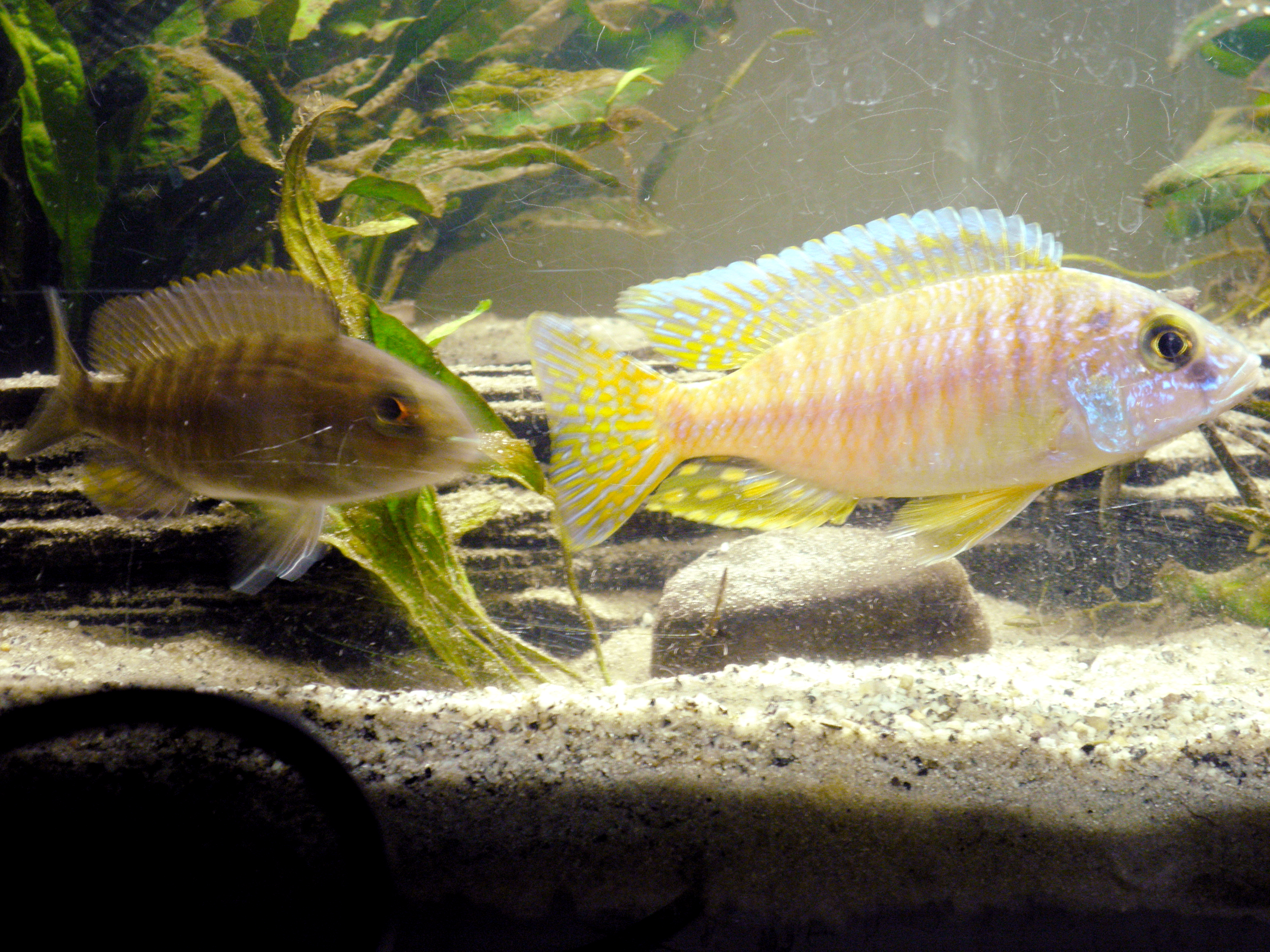

Conservation status
- Least Concern (IUCN 3.1)

Scientific classification
- Kingdom: Animalia
- Phylum: Chordata
- Class: Actinopterygii
- Order: Cichliformes
- Family: Cichlidae
- Genus: Aulonocara
- Species: A. hueseri

Binomial name
- Aulonocara hueseri M. K. Meyer, Riehl & Zetzsche, 1987

= Night aulonocara =

Species of fish

The night aulonocara (Aulonocara hueseri) is a species of freshwater fish in the family Cichlidae. It is endemic to Lake Malawi and known from the Malawian part of the lake. It grows to 7.9 cm (3.1 in) SL. The specific name honours the cichlid aquarist Eberhard Hüser of Hildesheim in Germany.
