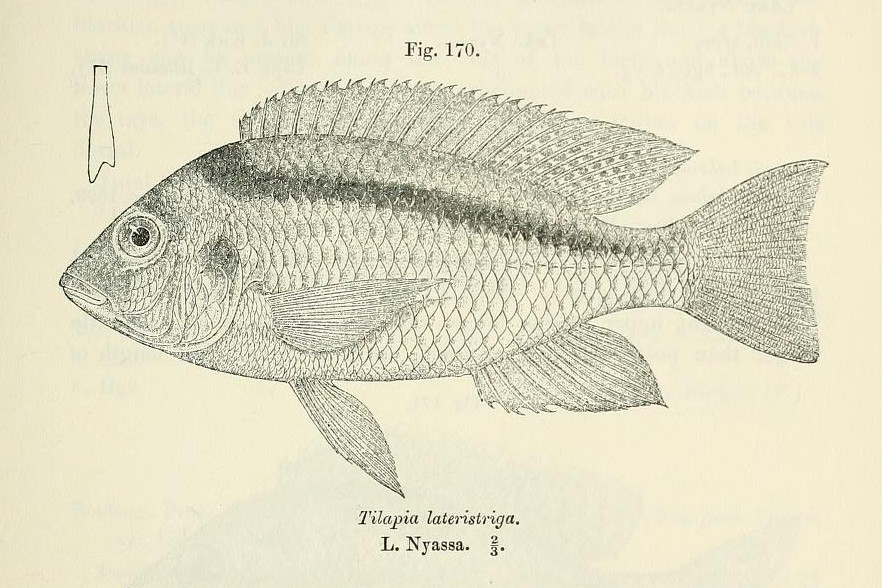

Conservation status
- Least Concern (IUCN 3.1)

Scientific classification
- Kingdom: Animalia
- Phylum: Chordata
- Class: Actinopterygii
- Order: Cichliformes
- Family: Cichlidae
- Genus: Mylochromis
- Species: M. lateristriga

Binomial name
- Mylochromis lateristriga (Günther, 1864)

Synonyms
- Chromis lateristriga Günther, 1864; Cyrtocara lateristriga (Günther, 1864); Haplochromis lateristriga (Günther, 1864); Maravichromis lateristriga (Günther, 1864); Tilapia lateristriga (Günther, 1864)

= Basket hap =

Species of fish

The basket hap (Mylochromis lateristriga) is a species of cichlid endemic to Lake Malawi where it is found in the southern portion, preferring sheltered bays with sandy or vegetated substrates. This species can reach a length of 20.7 centimetres (8.1 in) TL. This species can also be found in the aquarium trade.
