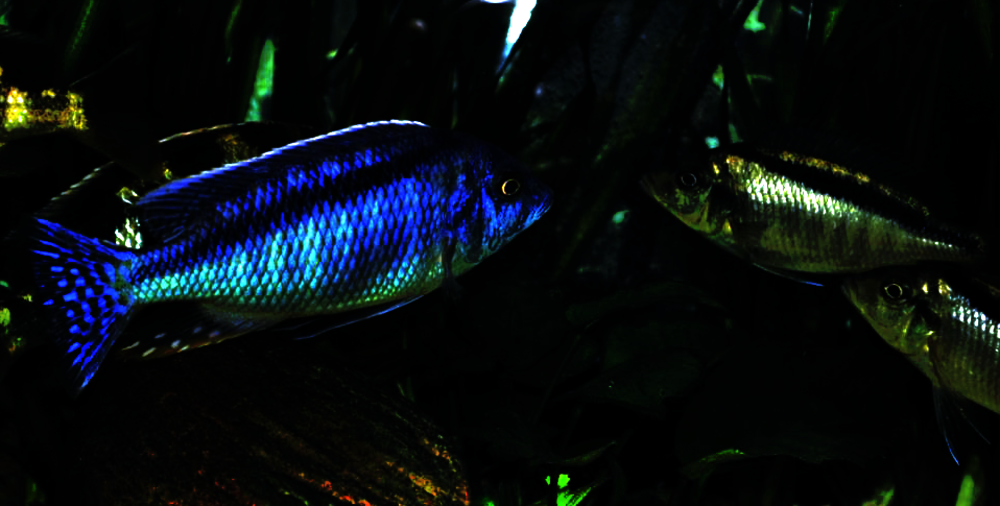
- male (left) and two females (right)

Conservation status
- Least Concern (IUCN 3.1)

Scientific classification
- Kingdom: Animalia
- Phylum: Chordata
- Class: Actinopterygii
- Order: Cichliformes
- Family: Cichlidae
- Genus: Mylochromis
- Species: M. melanonotus

Binomial name
- Mylochromis melanonotus (Regan, 1922)

Synonyms
- Haplochromis melanonotus Regan, 1922; Cyrtocara melanonotus (Regan, 1922); Maravichromis melanonotus (Regan, 1922); Platygnathochromis melanonotus (Regan, 1922)

= Haplochromis yellow black line =

Species of fish

The haplochromis yellow black line (Mylochromis melanonotus) is a species of cichlid fish endemic to Lake Malawi where it is usually found over sandy substrates. This species can reach a length of 26 centimetres (10 in) TL.
