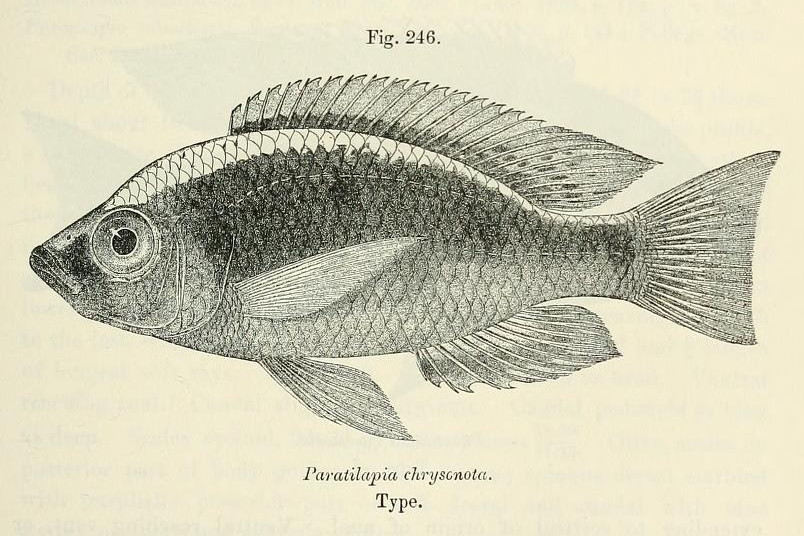

Conservation status
- Least Concern (IUCN 3.1)

Scientific classification
- Kingdom: Animalia
- Phylum: Chordata
- Class: Actinopterygii
- Order: Cichliformes
- Family: Cichlidae
- Genus: Copadichromis
- Species: C. chrysonotus

Binomial name
- Copadichromis chrysonotus (Boulenger, 1908)

Synonyms
- Paratilapia chrysonota Boulenger, 1908; Cyrtocara chrysonota (Boulenger, 1908); Cyrtocara chrysonotus (Boulenger, 1908); Haplochromis chrysonotus (Boulenger, 1908)

= Copadichromis chrysonotus =

Species of fish

Copadichromis chrysonotus is a species of fish in the family Cichlidae. It is found in Malawi, Mozambique, and Tanzania. Its natural habitat is freshwater lakes.
