= Aulonocara trematocephalum =

Conservation status
- Data Deficient (IUCN 3.1)

Scientific classification
- Kingdom: Animalia
- Phylum: Chordata
- Class: Actinopterygii
- Order: Cichliformes
- Family: Cichlidae
- Genus: Aulonocara
- Species: A. trematocephalum

Binomial name
- Aulonocara trematocephalum (Boulenger, 1901)

Synonyms
- Tilapia trematocephala Boulenger, 1901; Aulonocara trematocephala (Boulenger, 1901); Limnotilapia trematocephala (Boulenger, 1901); Trematocranus trematocephala (Boulenger, 1901)

Species of fish

Aulonocara trematocephalum is a species of haplochromine cichlid endemic to Lake Malawi. It is only known from the holotype which was erroneously recorded as being collected from the "north end of Lake Tanganyika" and described as Tilapia trematocephala. It belonged to one of the Malawi cichlid groups and was initially included in the genus Trematocranus
