= Mola del Guerxet =

- Location within Catalonia

Highest point
- Elevation: 1,121 m (3,678 ft)
- Coordinates: 41°20′16″N 1°4′8″E

Geography
- Location: Conca de Barberà, Catalonia
- Parent range: Prades Mountains

Climbing
- First ascent: Unknown
- Easiest route: From Vimbodí i Poblet or Montblanc

Mola del Guerxet is a mountain of Catalonia, Spain. It has an elevation of 1,121 metres above sea level.

== See also ==
- Prades Mountains
- Mountains of Catalonia
