= Placidochromis subocularis =

Conservation status
- Least Concern (IUCN 3.1)

Scientific classification
- Kingdom: Animalia
- Phylum: Chordata
- Class: Actinopterygii
- Order: Cichliformes
- Family: Cichlidae
- Genus: Placidochromis
- Species: P. subocularis

Binomial name
- Placidochromis subocularis (Günther, 1894)

Synonyms
- Chromis subocularis Günther, 1894; Cyrtocara subocularis (Günther, 1894); Haplochromis subocularis (Günther, 1894); Maravichromis subocularis (Günther, 1894); Mylochromis subocularis (Günther, 1894); Tilapia subocularis (Günther, 1894)

Species of fish

Placidochromis subocularis is a species of cichlid endemic to Lake Malawi and Lake Malombe where it is found where sandy and rocky zones meet or over sandy substrates at depths of from 15 to 18 metres (49 to 59 ft). It feeds on aquatic invertebrates including snails. This species can reach a length of 16.2 centimetres (6.4 in) TL. It can also be found in the aquarium trade.
