= Copadichromis pleurostigmoides =

Conservation status
- Least Concern (IUCN 3.1)

Scientific classification
- Kingdom: Animalia
- Phylum: Chordata
- Class: Actinopterygii
- Order: Cichliformes
- Family: Cichlidae
- Genus: Copadichromis
- Species: C. pleurostigmoides

Binomial name
- Copadichromis pleurostigmoides (Iles, 1960)

Synonyms
- Haplochromis pleurostigmoides Iles, 1960; Cyrtocara pleurostigmoides (Iles, 1960)

Species of fish

Copadichromis pleurostigmoides is a species of haplochromine cichlid which is endemic to Lake Malawi. It is found throughout the lake in Malawi, Mozambique, and Tanzania. This species is found inshore in both rocky and sandy areas. It breeds from April to August when the males defend spawning sites situated on top of flat rocks at depths of 20–40 metres (66–131 ft) in sediment rich areas of mixed rocks and soft substrates.
