= Aulonocara kandeense =

Conservation status
- Critically Endangered (IUCN 3.1)

Scientific classification
- Kingdom: Animalia
- Phylum: Chordata
- Class: Actinopterygii
- Order: Cichliformes
- Family: Cichlidae
- Genus: Aulonocara
- Species: A. kandeense

Binomial name
- Aulonocara kandeense Tawil & Allgayer, 1987

Species of fish

Aulonocara kandeense, the blue orchid aulonacara, is a species of haplochromine cichlid which is endemic to Lake Malawi where it occurs only around Kande Island, in Malawian waters. It is found in a mixed habitat where rocky areas meet softer substrates. The breeding males are found at a mean depth of 8 metres (26 ft) They sift their food from the sand and this is made up of small invertebrates. It detects the movements of tiny prey under the surface of the sand. The males are territorial and they defend their territories where the sand meets rockier areas. The females gather in large schools to forage, and these can count over 100 fishes, over the open sand a few metres away from any rocks. spawning occurs within a cave or cavity within the male's cave, which usually near the lake bed. There can be over 100 fry in a brood.

They are collected for the aquarium trade and this is where the common name originates.
