= Ad Konings =

Dutch ichthyologist

Adrianus Franciscus Johannes Marinus Maria "Ad" Konings (born 11 January 1956) is a Dutch ichthyologist originally trained in medicine and biology. Konings is best known for his research on African rift lake cichlids. After studies in Amsterdam, he has spent most of his life in Rotterdam.

== Early life ==
Konings was born 11 January 1956 in Roosendaal, Netherlands. He started keeping cichlids when he was 14 years old in 1970. Soon he was breeding rare African cichlids and working as an assistant to the largest tropical fish dealer in the Netherlands.

== Academic studies and early career ==
From 1974-1980 he studied medical biology at the University of Amsterdam and was awarded his Ph.D. in 1980. He chose this field despite his love of ichthyology due to a fear that if he chose the latter field he would be unemployable. From 1980-1986. he did research on lysosomal enzymes at the Erasmus University in Rotterdam. Most of this was DNA-related work (molecular biology).

In 1986, Konings moved to St. Leon-Rot, Germany (near Heidelberg), where he started to write books and breed Lake Tanganyika cichlids. He also worked for 18 months at the University of Heidelberg Parasitology Department.

== As publisher and photographer ==
Konings and his future wife started their own publishing company, Cichlid Press, in 1991. Its first book was titled the Cichlids Yearbook, vol. 1. The business grew and now publishes a number of cichlid guidebooks by Konings and other authors; its publications are often regarded as the standard reference works on various classes of African cichlids. Amazon booksellers list 36 different books or publications under his name.

He is also a prolific photographer, and a recent Google image search under his name yielded 6,900 images.

Late in her career famed ichthyologist Ethelwynn Trewavas mentored Konings, providing feedback and suggestions for his research. When her eyesight failed late in her life she asked him to accept her stereo microscope as a gift from the prominent African cichlid expert of the mid-20th century to the man who succeeded her in describing a multitude of new cichlid species.

Konings also was mentored by prominent fish explorer and exporter Stuart Grant early in his career, and when Konings married his wife Gertrud (nḗe Dudin), also a biologist, in 1996 in Malawi Grant and his wife Esther were best man and maid of honor.

Konings moved to El Paso, Texas, in 1996, relocating Cichlid Press along with his family. In interviews he has described a love of the area's climate and landscape as the reason for the move. The Konings have taken up the study of cacti since their move, photographing every species and variety of cactus native to Texas.

He occasionally leads expeditions to Lake Malawi and lectures extensively around the world.

== Publications ==
- Back To Nature Guide to Malawi Cichlids by Ad Konings; Hardcover; Cichlid Press; 2nd edition (November 20, 2003); ISBN 0-9668255-9-4; ISBN 978-0-9668255-9-6
- Malawi Cichlids in Their Natural Habitat by Ad Konings; Hardcover; Cichlid Press; 3rd edition (July 31, 2001); ISBN 0-9668255-3-5; ISBN 978-0-9668255-3-4
- Enjoying Cichlids by Kjell Fohrman, Mary Bailey, Ad Konings; Hardcover; Cichlid Press (November 30, 2002); ISBN 0-9668255-7-8; ISBN 978-0-9668255-7-2
- Celebrating Cichlids from Lakes Malawi and Tanganyika by Ad Konings; Hardcover; Cichlid Press (August 31, 2005); ISBN 1-932892-02-8; ISBN 978-1-932892-02-4
- Tanganyika Cichlids in Their Natural Habitat by Ad Konings; Hardcover; Cichlid Press; ISBN 0-9668255-0-0; ISBN 978-0-9668255-0-3
- Guide to Malawi Cichlids by Ad Konings; Hardcover; Aqualog Verlag GmbH (January 1997); ISBN 3-9805605-3-8; ISBN 978-3-9805605-3-5
- Guide to Tanganyika Cichlids by Ad Konings; Hardcover; Aqualog Verlag GmbH (January 1996); ISBN 3-928457-37-3; ISBN 978-3-928457-37-8
- Konings' Book of Cichlids and All the Other Fishes of Lake Malawi by Ad Konings; Hardcover; TFH Publications (July 1991); ISBN 0-86622-527-7; ISBN 978-0-86622-527-4
- Cichlids from Central America by Ad Konings; Hardcover; Tropical Fish Hobbyist (February 1989); ISBN 0-86622-700-8; ISBN 978-0-86622-700-1
- The Cichlid Diversity of Lake Malawi/Nyasa/Niassa: Identification, Distribution and Taxonomy by Jos Snoeks and Ad Konings; Hardcover; Cichlid Press (November, 2004); ISBN 0-9668255-8-6; ISBN 978-0-9668255-8-9
- Cacti of Texas: in their natural habitat by Gertrud & Ad Konings; Cichlid Press (2009); ISBN 978-1-932892-08-6
- Featherfins in their natural habitat; ISBN 978-1-932892-17-8

== Tribute ==
Two Lake Malawi cichlids have been named after him, namely Aulonocara koningsi by Patrick Tawil in 2003, and Placidochromis koningsi by Hanssens in 2004.

== See also ==
- Category:Taxa named by Ad Konings
