= Ethelwynn Trewavas =

British ichthyologist (1900–1993)

- Born: 5 November 1900; Penzance, Cornwall, England
- Died: 16 August 1993 (aged 92); Reading, Berkshire, England
- Education: Reading University (Bachelor's, 1921)
- Occupations: Ichthyologist, taxonomist

Ethelwynn Trewavas (5 November 1900 – 16 August 1993) was an ichthyologist at the British Museum (Natural History). She was known for her work on the families Cichlidae and Sciaenidae. She worked with Charles Tate Regan, another ichthyologist and taxonomist.

== Academic studies and career ==
She received her bachelor's degree and Board of Education Certificate in Teaching in 1921 from Reading University, and then worked as a teacher before being employed by the King's College of Household and Social Science as a part-time demonstrator, spending most of her time on research. She was taught by Dr. Nellie B. Eales when associated with the Freshwater Biological Association. She met Charles Regan and was employed by him as his assistant until hired by the British Museum (Natural History) as Assistant Keeper in 1935. She was appointed Deputy Keeper of Zoology in 1958, and retired in 1961.

She served as the senior scientist in the Fish Section of the British Museum (Natural History) for almost 50 years, and was known internationally as an authority on several diverse groups of fishes. She was best known for her work describing African Rift lake cichlids, but she published extensively on other groups as well. She used laboratory study and extended field trips to research her current areas of study, and often relied on interviews with local people to understand the behaviours, forms and food potential of fishes.

One example of the influence of Regan and Trewavas is that of the currently named genus categories of Lake Malawi mbuna, two are attributed to Regan and six to Trewavas. Of the Haplochromis sensu lato in the lake, five were described by Regan and twenty-seven by Trewavas, either individually or in partnership with David Eccles.

Later in life she mentored prominent researcher Ad Konings, who has continued many of her areas of study. When her eyesight failed she insisted that he accept her stereo microscope as a gift so he could continue her work with African cichlids.

Trewavas died in Reading on 16 August 1993.

== Honours ==
Trewavas was awarded the Linnean Medal of the Linnean Society of London in 1968, and elected as a Fellow (honoris causa) of the society in 1991. She was elected an Honorary Foreign Member of the American Society of Ichthyologists and Herpetologists in 1946, and awarded an honorary Doctor of Science degree by Stirling University in 1986.

== Species and genera named after Trewavas ==
Many fellow ichthyologists honoured Trewavas by naming newly discovered species after her. Even during her lifetime, more fish species had received the specific epithet trewavasae ("of Trewavas") or ethelwynnae ("of Ethelwynn") than were named after most other modern fish researchers, underscoring the importance of her contribution to the field:

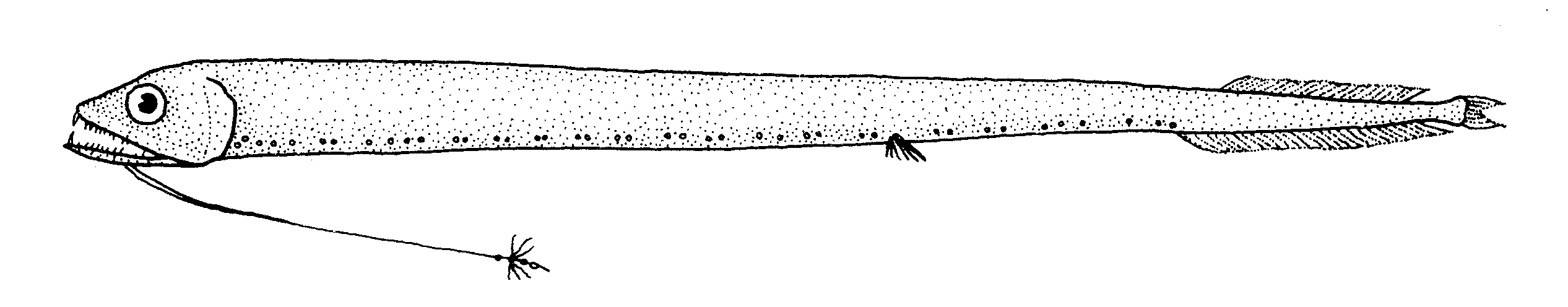
Eustomias trawavasae - A species of deep-sea dragonfish, named in honour of Dr Ethelwynn Trewavas.

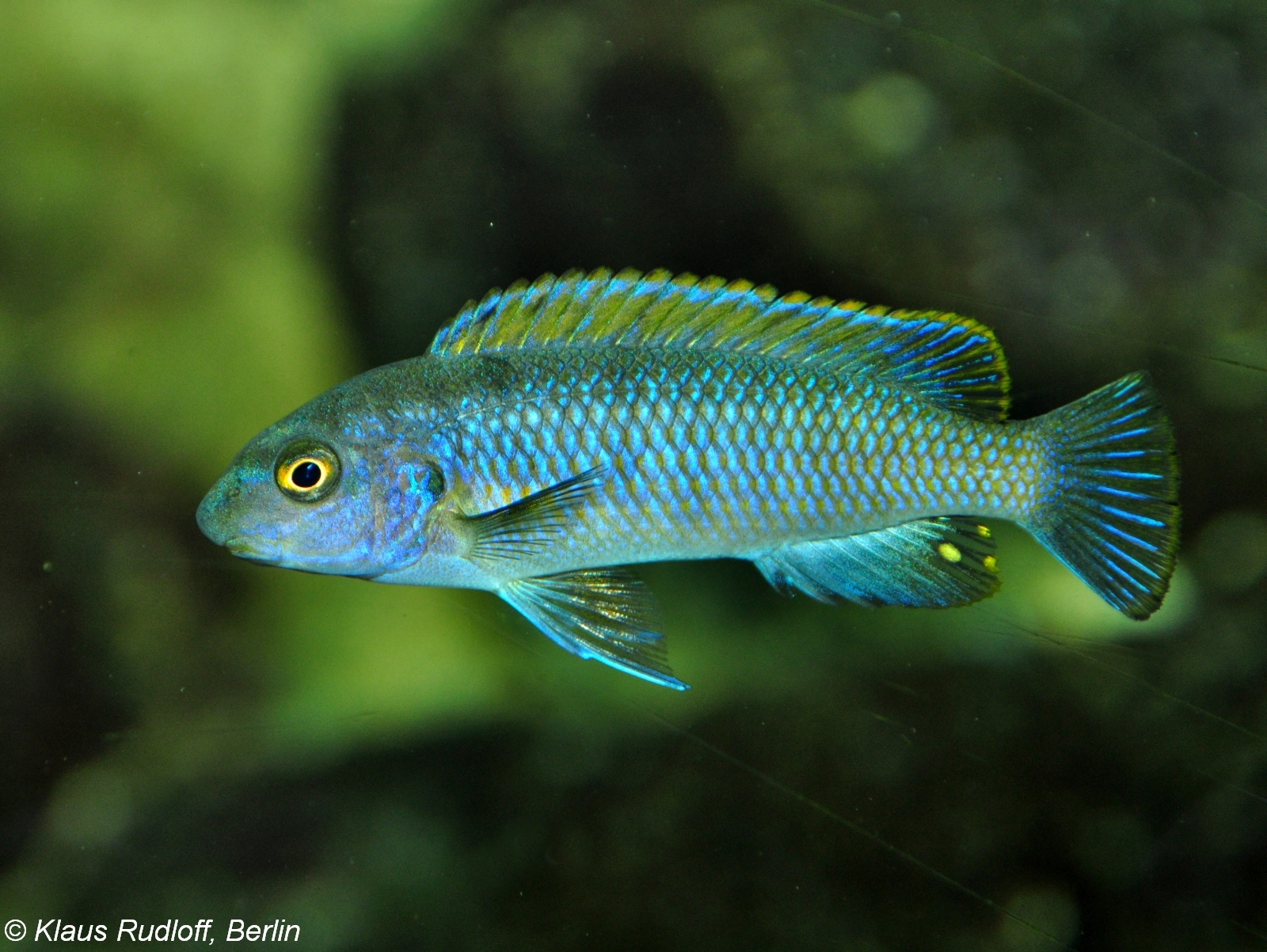
Scrapermouth mbuna

- The deepsea dragonfish Eustomias trewavasae Norman, 1930
- Glyptothorax trewavasae Hora, 1938
- The threadfin cichlid Petrochromis trewavasae Poll, 1948
- Symphurus trewavasae Chabanaud, 1948
- Garra trewavasai Monod, 1950
- The Lake Malawi cichlid Labeotropheus trewavasae Fryer, 1956
- Garra ethelwynnae Menon, 1958
- Neolebias trewavasae Poll & Gosse, 1963
- Atrobucca trewavasae Talwar & Sathirajan, 1975
- Protosciaena trewavasae (Chao & Miller, 1975)
- Linophryne trewavasae Bertelsen, 1978
- Gobiocichla ethelwynnae Roberts, 1982
- Phenacostethus trewavasae Parenti, 1986
- The Lake Malawi cichlid Aulonocara ethelwynnae M. K. Meyer, Riehl & Zetzsche, 1987
- Tylochromis trewavasae Stiassny, 1989
- Triplophysa trewavasae Mirza & Ahmad, 1990
- Johnius trewavasae
  Johnius trewavasae Sasaki, 1992
- The eel Rhynchoconger trewavasae Ben-Tuvia, 1993
- Etia Schliewen & Stiassny, 2003 (Explanation: Her colleagues often called her by her initials, E.T.)
- †Trewavasia White & Moy-Thomas, 1941

After her death, the memory of her contributions remained. Posthumous honorific names are, as of 2009:

- The Lake Malawi cichlid Copadichromis trewavasae Konings, 1999
- Placidochromis trewavasae Hanssens, 2004

== Publications (incomplete) ==
- 1983: Tilapiine Fishes of the Genera "Sarotherodon", "Oreochromis" and "Danakilia" . 583 pages. London: British Museum (Natural History) ISBN 0-565-00878-1

== Taxa described by her ==
- See Category:Taxa named by Ethelwynn Trewavas
