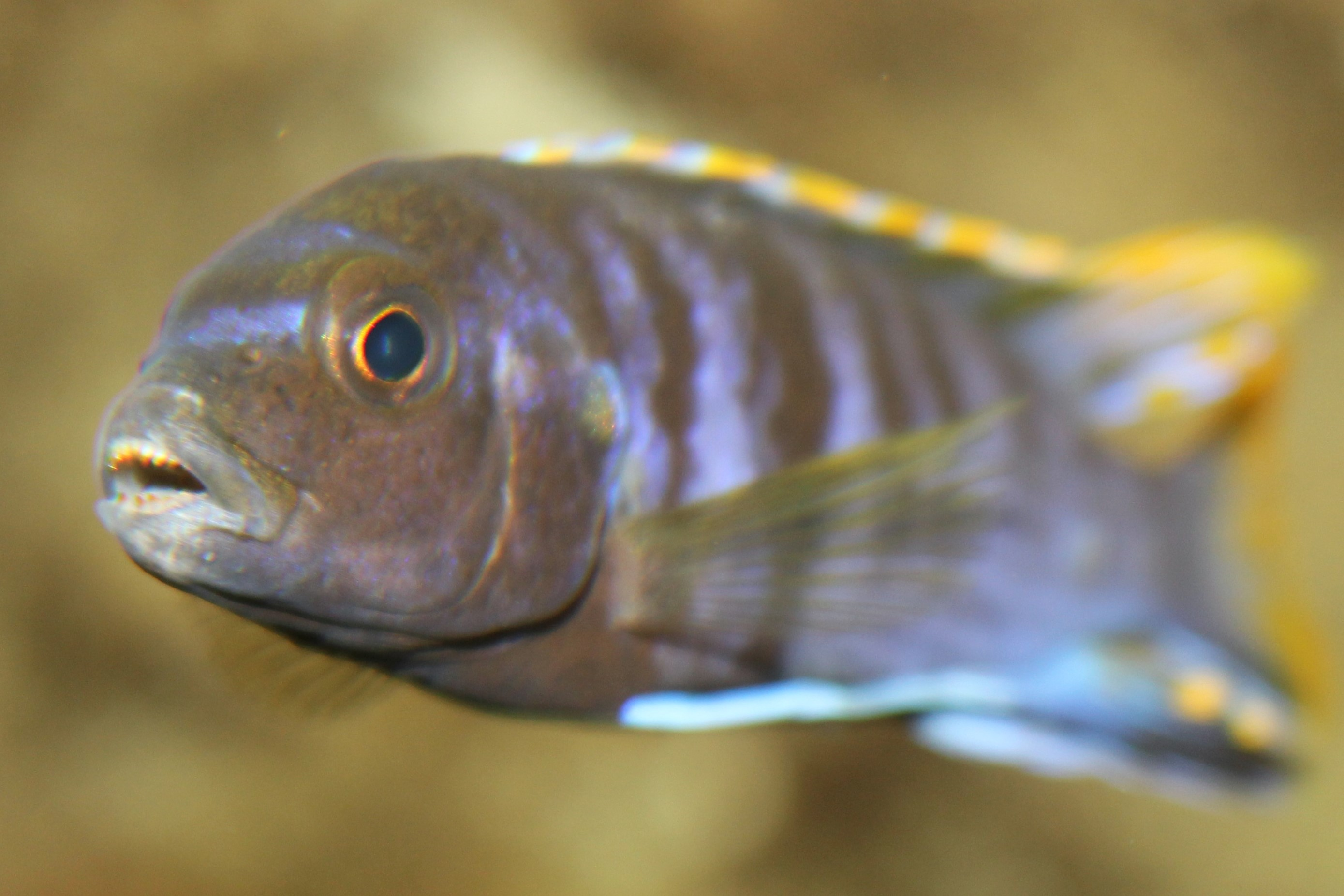
- Chindongo demasoni

Scientific classification
- Kingdom: Animalia
- Phylum: Chordata
- Class: Actinopterygii
- Order: Cichliformes
- Family: Cichlidae
- Tribe: Haplochromini
- Genus: Chindongo; Shan Li, Konings and Stauffer, 2016

Type species
- Chindongo bellicosus Li, Konings & Stauffer, 2016

= Chindongo =

Genus of fishes

Chindongo is a genus of haplochromine cichlids, the species of which are endemic to Lake Malawi. The genus was described in 2016 with Chindongo bellicosus as the type species, the authors then added species previously classified in the genus Pseudotropheus in the P. elongatus species complex.

== Characteristics ==
The differences which distinguish the genus Chindongo from other mbuna genera in Lake Malawi are the possession of bicuspid teeth in the front parts of the outer rows of both the upper and lower mandibles, the vomer is moderately to steeply sloped and has a narrow rostral tip has an angle of between 53° and 68° with the parasphenoid, they have a small mouth in which the lower jaw is slightly shorter than the upper jaw, there is a wide tooth bearing area on the anterior portions of both the premaxillary bone and dentary which have three or more rows of teeth (normally 5–6 rows) and a pattern of vertical bars on their flanks throughout their development.

== Species ==
The following 11 species are recognised as belonging to the genus Chindongo:

- Chindongo ater (Stauffer, 1988)
- Chindongo bellicosus Shan Li, Konings and Stauffer, 2016
- Chindongo cyaneus (Stauffer, 1988)
- Chindongo demasoni (Konings, 1994)
- Chindongo elongatus (Fryer, 1956)
- Chindongo flavus (Stauffer, 1988)
- Chindongo heteropictus (Staeck, 1980)
- Chindongo longior (Seegers, 1996)
- Chindongo minutus (Fryer, 1956)
- Chindongo saulosi (Konings, 1990)
- Chindongo socolofi (Johnson, 1974)
