= List of cichlid fish of Africa =

This is a list of African cichlid species that are commonly kept by aquarists.

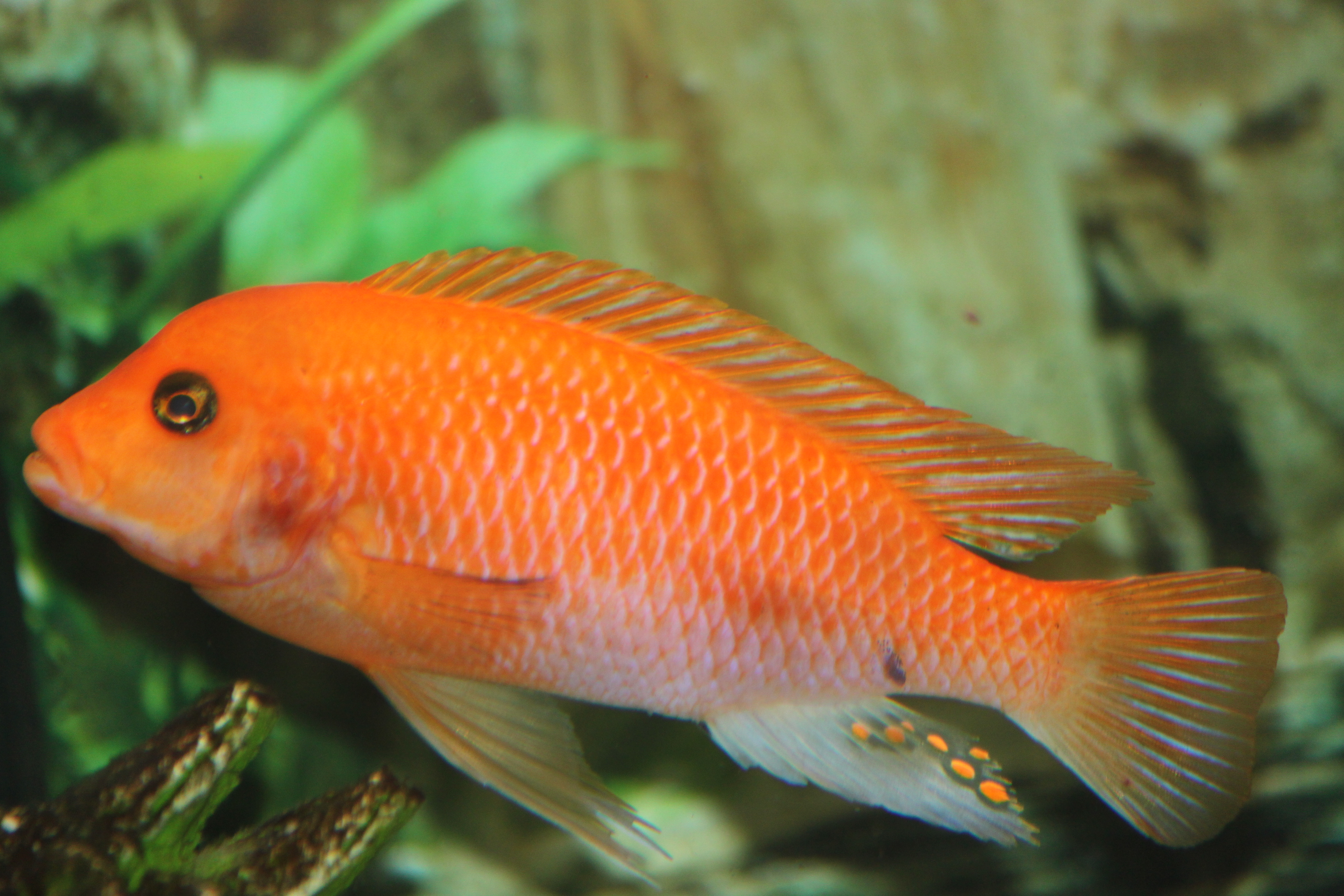
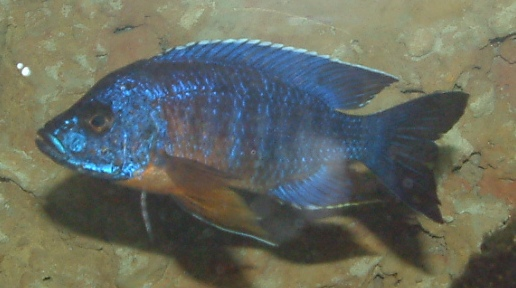
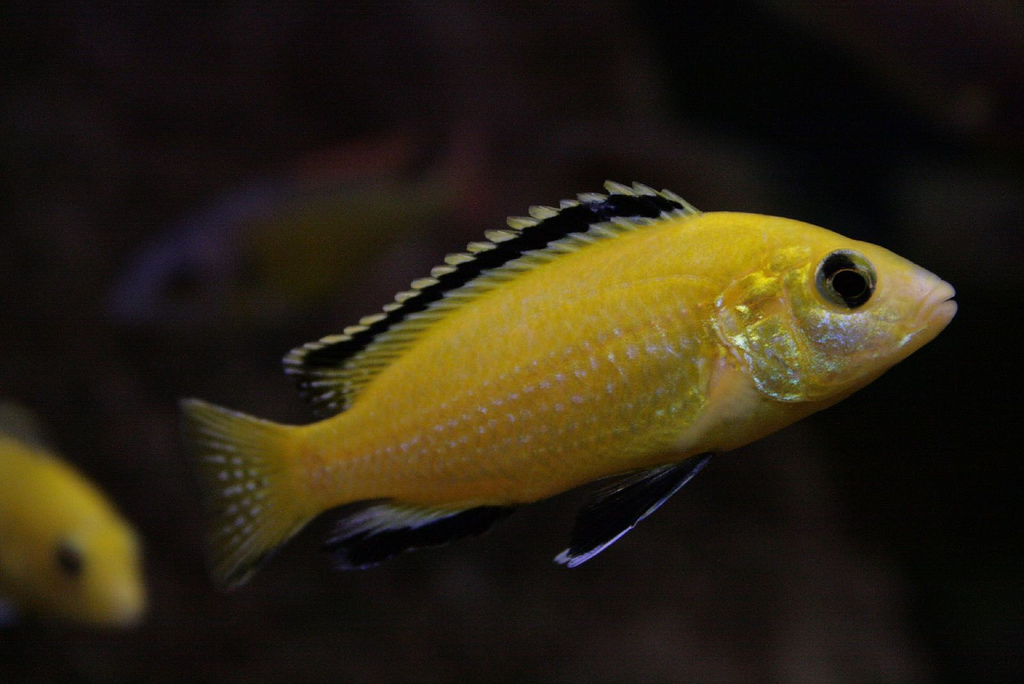
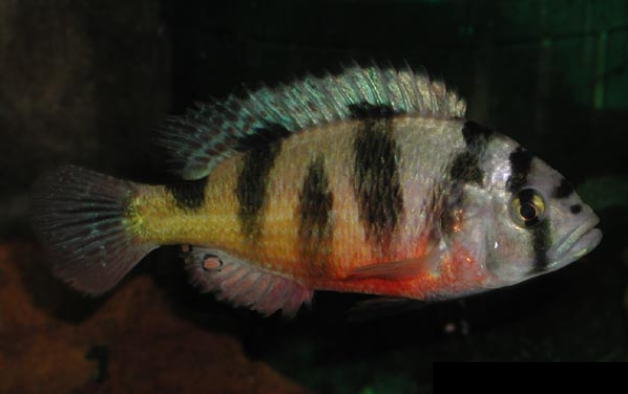
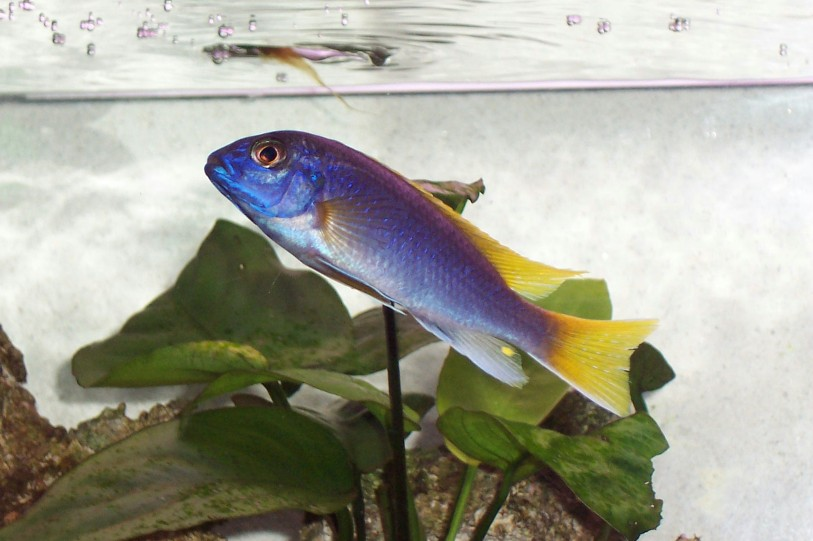
Cichlid breeds
Picture	Common name	Species	Lake	Size	Aggression	Level	Description
	Red Zebra	Pseudotropheus estherae	Malawi	5 inches or 12.7 cm	Moderate	Mbuna	Very common in shops. Strangely, neither red, nor striped
	Aulonocara fort maguire	Aulonocara hansbaenschi	Malawi	5 inches or 12.7 cm	Moderate	Utaka	Many variations
	Yellow Lab	Labidochromis caeruleus	Malawi	6 inches or 15.24 cm	Minimal	Mbuna
	Zebra Obliquidens	Astatotilapia (Haplochromis) latifasciata	Kioga	4 inches or 10.16 cm	Minimal	Utaka	Often sold as haplochromis obliquidens from Lake Victoria (but is not)
	Msobo	Metriaclima Msobo	Malawi	6 inches or 15.24 cm	Minimal	Mbuna	Males are blue, females yellow
	Blue Acei	Pseudotropheus Acei	Malawi	6 inches or 15.24 cm	Moderate	Mbuna	Swims on the top, even though a mbuna
	Christmas Fulu	Xystichromis phytophagus	Victoria	6 inches or 15.24 cm	Minimal	Mbuna	Spectacular male mating colors

Another African cichlid is a Frontosa (Cyphotilapia frontosa) which is commonly found in Lake Tanganyika. It grows to about 10-14 inches has minimal aggression and is stripy.

== See also ==
- List of freshwater aquarium fish species, a more comprehensive list of Africa cichlids
- List of South American cichlids
- Aquarium
