= Lake Nakuwa Wetland System =

Wetland in Uganda

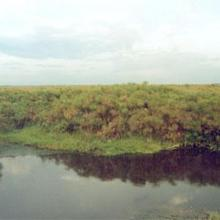
- Lake Nakuwa Wetland
- Location: Kamuli, Soroti and Pallisa district
- Coordinates: 1°15′N 33°31′E
- Surface area: 911.5 square kilometres (351.9 sq mi)

Lake Nakuwa Wetland System is a wetland found in the south-eastern part of the Kyoga system covering the districts of Kamuli District, Pallisa District and Soroti District in Eastern Uganda. The wetland is located 25 kilometres (16 mi) from Pallisa town. It covers an area of 911.5 km².

It is associated with a number of satellite lakes and a swamp system containing papyrus which is used for making mats, thatching, and crafts as well as cichlid species and other fish taxa. The wetland plays a role in flood prevention and water purification, as well as ground-water recharge. It is also used for bird watching.

== Location and structure ==
Lake Nakuwa Wetland System is located in the districts of Kamuli (Kagulu, Nawaikoke, Bumanya, Gudumire, and Namwiwa sub-counties), Pallisa (Gogonyo, Apopong, Buseta, and Pallisa sub-counties), and Soroti (Pingire and Kateta sub-counties) in Eastern Uganda, East Africa. It is situated at latitude 01° 15′ and longitude 33° 31′. It is surrounded by a various lakes such as Budipa, Nawampasa, Murlu and Nkodokodo.

== Activities ==
Lake Nakuwa Wetland is a natural water reservoir for the Nile, supports fishing for the local community, stores water for ground water recharge and its also an area of tourism. This wetland also houses fauna such as bird species especially the shoebill Balaeniceps rex and the papyrus gonolek Laniarius mufumbiri.

== Uniqueness ==
Lake Nakuwa Wetland is composed of suds which is floating vegetation that forms obstructive masses that characterize much of the white Nile. The suds act as obstacles to the Nile perch and prevent it from accessing this wetland thus creating a habitat for the haplochromine cichlid fish species in the wetland.

== See also ==
- Lake Bisina Wetland System
- Lake Opeta wetland system
