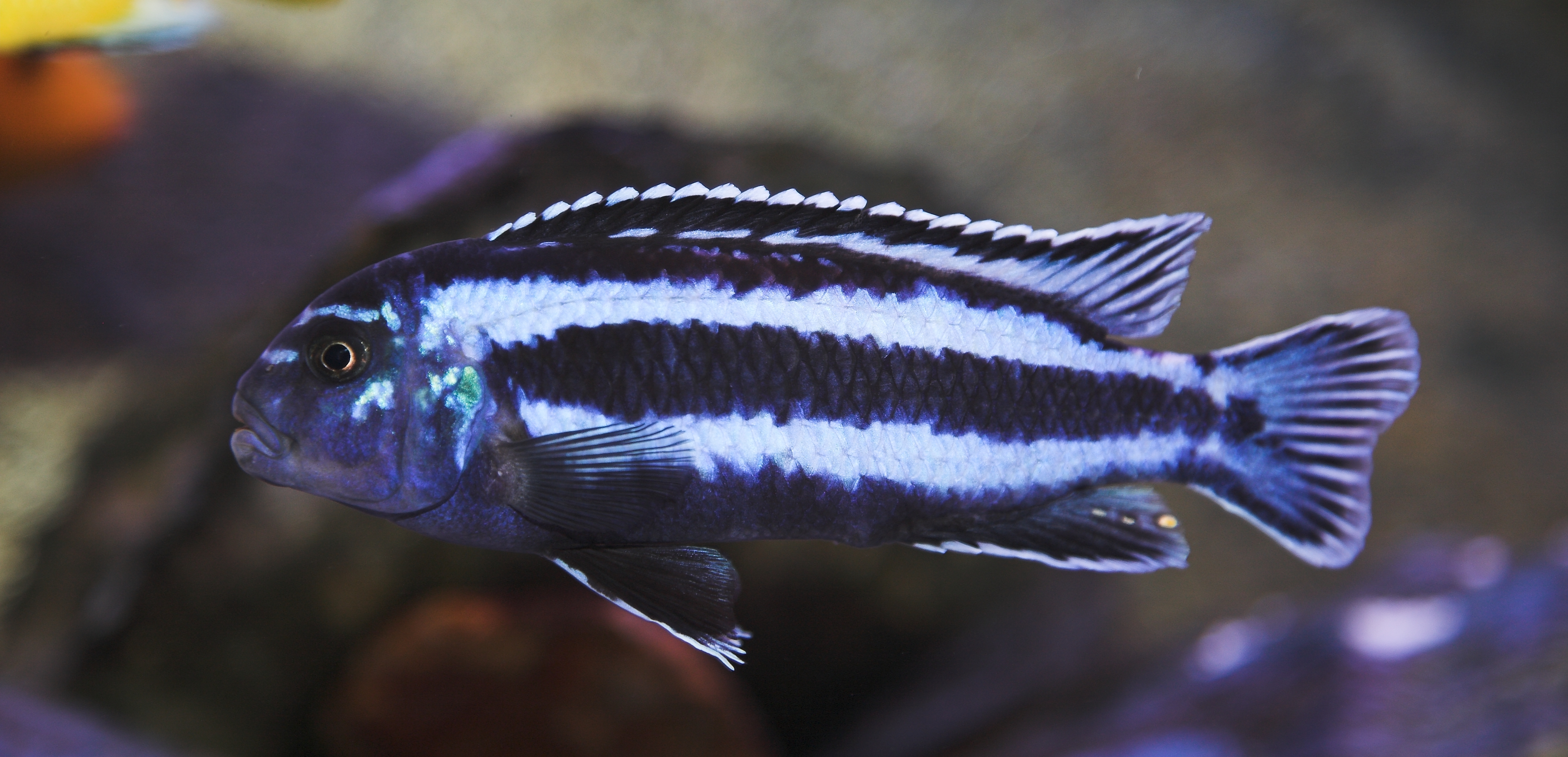
- Pseudotropheus cyaneorhabdos
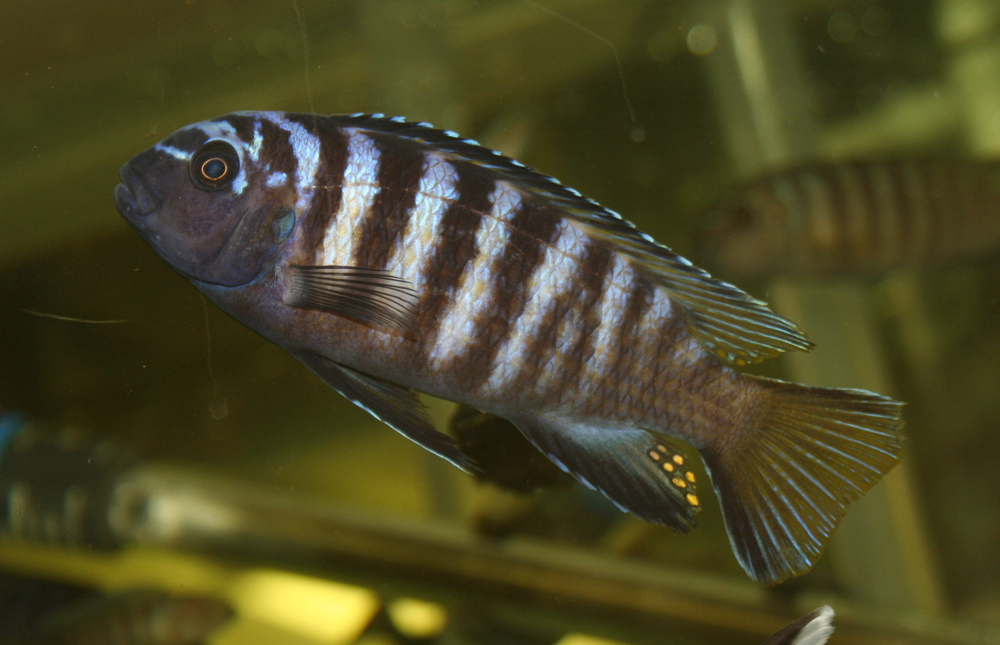
- Pseudotropheus elongatus

Scientific classification
- Kingdom: Animalia
- Phylum: Chordata
- Class: Actinopterygii
- Division: Teleostei
- Order: Cichliformes
- Family: Cichlidae
- Tribe: Haplochromini
- Genus: Pseudotropheus; Regan, 1922

Type species
- Chromis williamsi Günther, 1894

= Pseudotropheus =

Genus of fishes

Pseudotropheus is a genus of fishes in the family Cichlidae. These mbuna cichlids are endemic to Lake Malawi in Eastern Africa.

== Taxonomy ==
Like some other large cichlid genera, such as Cichlasoma, a number of related fishes have been recently reassigned to different genera such as Tropheops or Maylandia. Some species of Melanochromis in turn have been moved into Pseudotropheus.

There are currently 25 recognized species in this genus:

- Pseudotropheus ater Stauffer, 1988
- Pseudotropheus benetos (Bowers & Stauffer, 1997)
- Pseudotropheus brevis (Trewavas, 1935)
- Pseudotropheus crabro (Ribbink & D. S. C. Lewis, 1982)
- Pseudotropheus cyaneorhabdos (Bowers & Stauffer, 1997)
- Pseudotropheus cyaneus Stauffer, 1988
- Pseudotropheus demasoni Konings, 1994
- Pseudotropheus elegans Trewavas, 1935
- Pseudotropheus elongatus Fryer, 1956
- Pseudotropheus flavus Stauffer, 1988
- Pseudotropheus fuscoides Fryer, 1956
- Pseudotropheus fuscus Trewavas, 1935
- Pseudotropheus galanos Stauffer & Kellogg, 2002
- Pseudotropheus interruptus (D. S. Johnson, 1975)
- Pseudotropheus joanjohnsonae (D. S. Johnson, 1974)
- Pseudotropheus johannii Eccles, 1973
- Pseudotropheus likomae Konings, Miller, & Stauffer 2024
- Pseudotropheus longior Seegers, 1996
- Pseudotropheus minutus Fryer, 1956
- Pseudotropheus perileucos (Bowers & Stauffer, 1997)
- Pseudotropheus perspicax (Trewavas, 1935)
- Pseudotropheus purpuratus D. S. Johnson, 1976
- Pseudotropheus saulosi Konings, 1990
- Pseudotropheus socolofi D. S. Johnson, 1974
- Pseudotropheus tursiops W. E. Burgess & H. R. Axelrod, 1975
- Pseudotropheus williamsi (Günther, 1894)

Several of these were moved to the new genus Chindongo in 2016.

== Biology ==
Mbuna literally means "rockdweller" and this description accurately depicts the lifestyle of these cichlids which mostly live in rocky areas. Most pseudotrophine cichlids are algal grazers in the wild.

Like most cichlids from Lake Malawi, fish from this genus reproduce via maternal mouthbrooding. The males often have egg spots on their anal fins which attract spawn-ready females towards them where they attempt to retrieve the imitation eggs while the male emits sperm into her biting mouth, thus fertilizing the eggs. The female and male generally move in an intensive circular motion while they spawn. Eventually, the female retrieves all of her eggs and incubates them in her mouth without eating for 2–4 weeks depending on the species and the particular fish after which the fry are released. Most, possibly all species of Pseudotropheus will breed together if given the right environment.

== In aquaculture ==
Fish of this genus are popular amongst tropical aquarists. They are relatively aggressive fish, usually requiring large aquaria with ample rock coverage for hiding and providing havens from aggression. It is usually important to keep a high population of fish in the aquaria to distribute the aggression. They are extremely hardy fish and can live nearly ten years. It is best to keep them with other African cichlids of similar size.
