= Pseudotropheus fuscoides =

Scientific classification
- Kingdom: Animalia
- Phylum: Chordata
- Class: Actinopterygii
- Order: Cichliformes
- Family: Cichlidae
- Genus: Pseudotropheus
- Species: P. fuscoides

Binomial name
- Pseudotropheus fuscoides Fryer, 1856

Species of fish

Pseudotropheus fuscoides is a species of haplochromine cichlid endemic to Lake Malawi where it is known from Nkhata Bay and Lion's Cove. It can reach a length of 12 cm (4.7 in) in total length (TL). It can be found in the aquarium trade. Some authorities consider it to be a junior synonym of Pseudotropheus fuscus.
