= Kapir Atiira =

Village in Ngora district, eastern Uganda

Kapir Atiira is a small village in the Ngora district of Uganda.

== Overview ==
Kapir Atiira is a village of 1400 people. According to the chairman of the village, Ojamuge Stephen, the people have faced many hardships including raids from neighboring villages, HIV/AIDS, raids from the Lord's Resistance Army, and erratic weather such as droughts and floods of the Awoja River and Awoja swamplands. The Awoja Bridge is frequently out of use due to the river and swamplands flooding. Kapir Atiira does not have a clinic or school in the village. The nearest clinic is 20 km away in Soroti. Kapir Atiira has never received aid from the Ugandan government.

== Location ==
Kapir Atiira is 20 km west of Soroti town and 62 km east of Mbale on the Soroti Mbale Road. The village is located near Lake Bisina, the Awoja River, the Awoja Swamp, and the only large rock formation near the road between Soroti and Mbale. The Awoja River and Swamp connects Lake Kyoga to Lake Bisina. Kapir Atiira recently became part of the Ngora District; it was previously zoned in the Kumi District. The last census was taken in 2002; therefore there is no government data on the Ngora District yet.

== Demographics ==
There are 1421 people in Kapir Atiira. There are 597 children and 864 adults (aged 15+). The average life expectancy for men is between 42 and 50 years old and that for women is between 44 and 55 years old. There are 226 homesteads in the village and about 14–16 people live in each homestead.

The literacy rate in the village is less than 20% because most villagers only attend school for 3–10 years. Fifty-five children between the ages of 6 and 14 are out of school, and the remaining children attend school in a neighboring village. The average age to marry is between 14 and 20 years old, and women typically being having children at age 15. Between 45 and 55 children are born each year, and there are currently 166 babies in the village. A total of 15–20% of the village children die before they reach adolescence.

Only 16 villagers are open about having HIV, but the local leaders estimate 300–400 villagers are infected with the virus. Few villagers are financially able to go to the doctor in Soroti yearly. Forty percent of the villagers suffer from Malaria each year.

The village chairman is Ojamuge Stephen. Stephen is 44 and has been chairman of Kapir Atiira for 10 years. Demographic information was obtained by Raise the Village CBO Director, Biko Evarist, and village chairman, Ojamuge Stephen.

== Future ==
Kapir Atiira has partnered with a startup called New Charity Era L3C. New Charity Era L3C has developed an iPhone game called Raise the Village which allows users to build a virtual village and directly contribute to help Kapir Atiira become self sustainable.
