= Haplochromis argenteus =

Conservation status
- Critically endangered, possibly extinct (IUCN 3.1)

Scientific classification
- Kingdom: Animalia
- Phylum: Chordata
- Class: Actinopterygii
- Order: Cichliformes
- Family: Cichlidae
- Genus: Haplochromis
- Species: H. argenteus

Binomial name
- Haplochromis argenteus Regan, 1922

Synonyms
- Prognathochromis argenteus (Regan, 1922)

Species of fish

Haplochromis argenteus is a critically endangered species of cichlid fish that is endemic to the Lake Victoria system in Africa. This species reaches a standard length of 20.2 cm (8.0 in). The species declined rapidly after the Nile perch was introduced to Lake Victoria. Last reported from this lake in 1983, it was considered possibly extinct when evaluated by the IUCN in 2010. However, that same year, several were recorded during a fish survey of Lake Bisina, a satellite lake of Lake Kyoga.
