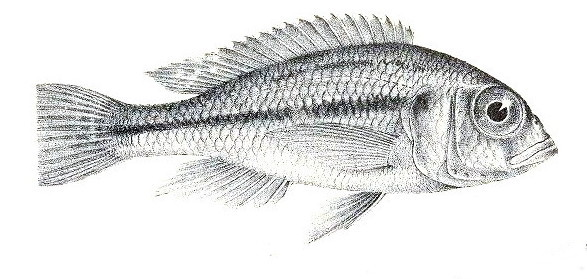

Conservation status
- Critically endangered, possibly extinct (IUCN 3.1)

Scientific classification
- Kingdom: Animalia
- Phylum: Chordata
- Class: Actinopterygii
- Order: Cichliformes
- Family: Cichlidae
- Genus: Haplochromis
- Species: H. martini

Binomial name
- Haplochromis martini (Boulenger, 1906)

Synonyms
- Tilapia martini Boulenger, 1906; Astatotilapia martini (Boulenger, 1906)

= Haplochromis martini =

Species of fish

Haplochromis martini is a critically endangered species of cichlid fish that is endemic to the Lake Victoria system in Africa. It reaches a standard length of 10.4 cm (4.1 in). The species declined rapidly after the Nile perch was introduced to Lake Victoria. Last reported from this lake in 1985, it was considered possibly extinct when evaluated by the IUCN in 2010. However, that same year, it was recorded during a fish survey of Lake Bisina, a satellite lake of Lake Kyoga.

== Etymology ==
The specific name honours James Martin who was Transport Officer in the Uganda Protectorate, for the assistance to the Swiss ornithologist who collected type, Edward Degen.
