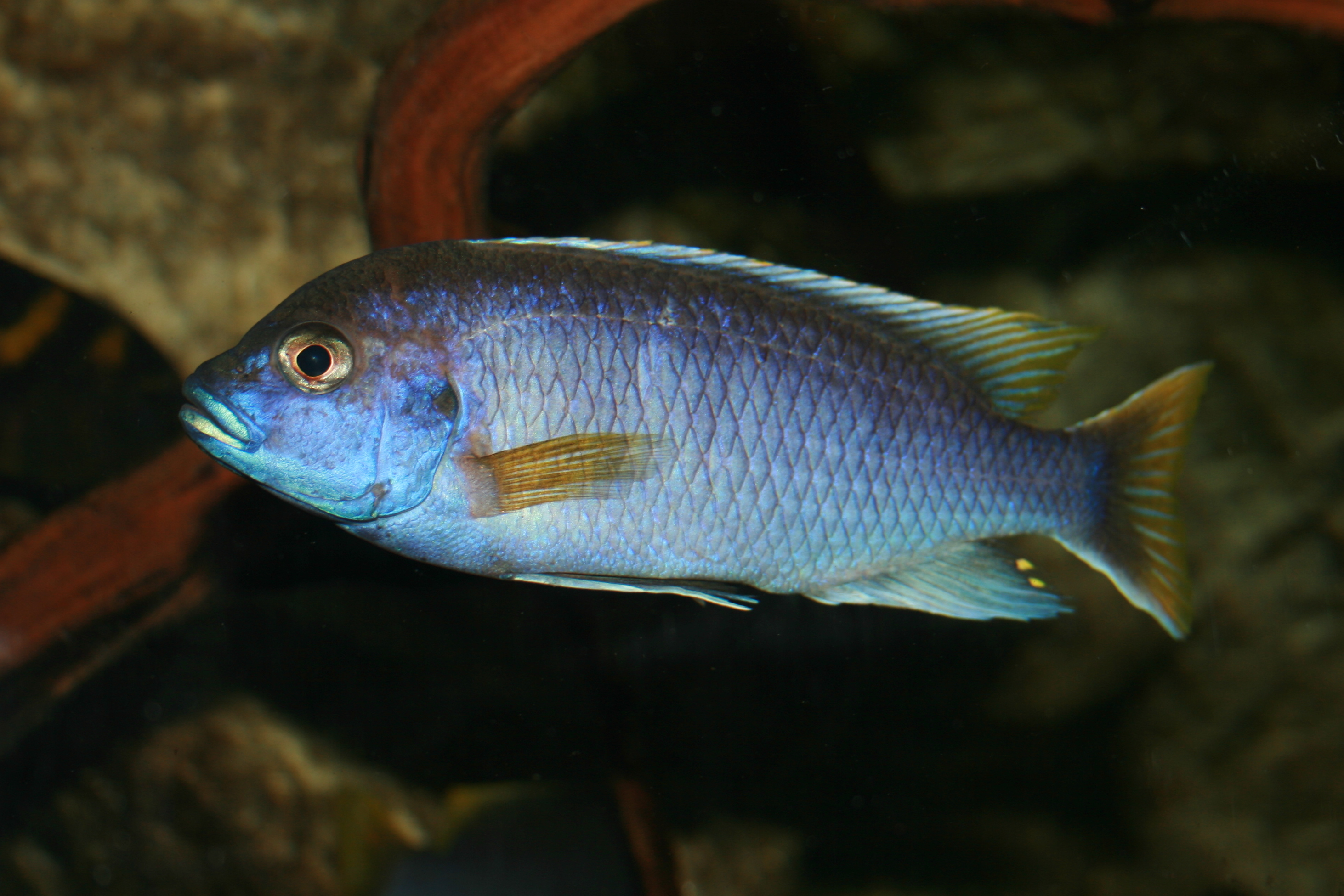

Scientific classification
- Kingdom: Animalia
- Phylum: Chordata
- Class: Actinopterygii
- Order: Cichliformes
- Family: Cichlidae
- Tribe: Haplochromini
- Genus: Pseudotropheus
- Species: Pseudotropheus sp. "acei"

Binomial name
- Pseudotropheus sp. "acei"

Synonyms
- Gephyrochromis sp. "acei"

= Pseudotropheus sp. "acei" =

Species of ray-finned fish

Pseudotropheus sp. "acei" (also known as yellow-tail acei) is a Mbuna cichlid from Lake Malawi that grows to around 6 in (15 cm) in length. Although known for many years, it has not been formally described. There are two different varieties: The most common yellow-tailed Pseudotropheus sp. "acei" (Msuli), and the white-tailed Pseudotropheus sp. "acei" (Ngara). Like most Mbuna, it dwells in shallower waters, however it will sometimes go near the surface, which is very uncommon for Mbunas. It is a very common fish for fish-keepers. It gets its common name from its blue body and yellow tail. Originally discovered in 1922 by Regan, the acei was originally believed to be a Pseudotropheus, but was later changed to Gephyrochromis and then back again. It prefers the sandy and rock filled shoreline where sunken logs are easily accessed. This species has developed the advantage of being able to harvest algae from submerged logs and roots. They are equipped with typical Gephyrochromid cuspid-like teeth that are flat for removing epixlyic or epilithic algae from wood. In the lake, schools of 30-50 individuals surrounding a large log are not uncommon, however in the rocky areas; schools usually consist of 3-10 individuals.

== Fish-keeping ==
These mbunas are omnivorous but prefer plants and algae in their diet. If they are to be fed staple, then any food made for African cichlids will do. Most vegetable matter will work as well. These fish are possibly the most peaceful fish in the Mbuna family, and because of this it is not necessary to have a male to female ratio. Their preferred water conditions are a pH of above 7.5 and a temperature of 78–82 °F (26–28 °C). They like a tank size of 55 gallons or more.

== Breeding ==
Pseudotropheus sp. "acei" is an ovophile mouth brooder, which means that the female will incubate and hatch the eggs in her buchal pouch, and then continue to hold the fry until the yolk sacs have been consumed. A typical holding period for this cichlid is three weeks, and the female will not eat during this time. Females can have around 50 fry per spawning, although this can greatly vary depending on her size and experience. Once the eggs are done incubating the female spits them out and they are left to fend for themselves.

== Anatomy ==
Acei like most mbunas have a very long intestine so they can live off a few bites of algae a day. These fish are at high risk for Malawi bloat. Bloat is caused by a protozoan that multiplies when a fish is under stress or consuming an improper diet. The protozoans multiply enough that they cause blockages in the intestines, so neither food nor gases can pass, causing them to become bloated. The bloat eventually damages their liver, swim bladder, and kidneys so much that they die in 24–78 hours. Acei have bicuspid teeth like the rest of the genus Pseudotropheus.
