= Haplochromis orthostoma =

Conservation status
- Vulnerable (IUCN 2.3)

Scientific classification
- Kingdom: Animalia
- Phylum: Chordata
- Class: Actinopterygii
- Order: Cichliformes
- Family: Cichlidae
- Genus: Haplochromis
- Species: H. orthostoma

Binomial name
- Haplochromis orthostoma Regan, 1922

Synonyms
- Pyxichromis orthostoma (Regan, 1922)

Species of fish

Haplochromis orthostoma is a species of cichlid fish that is endemic to the Lake Kyoga system in Uganda, where only known from Lake Bisina (a medium-sized lake to the east of Lake Kyoga itself) and Lake Nawampassa (a small lake southeast of Lake Kyoga itself and only separated by a thin swamp). Its continued survival in Lake Bisina is questionable as it has not been recorded in recent surveys, but it still survives in Lake Nawampassa. This piscivorous species is peaceful among similar-sized or larger fish, but will rapidly swallow smaller fish with its very large mouth. The largest officially measured specimen was 9.1 cm (3.6 in) in standard length, although it has been known to reach about 18 cm (7.1 in) in total length.
