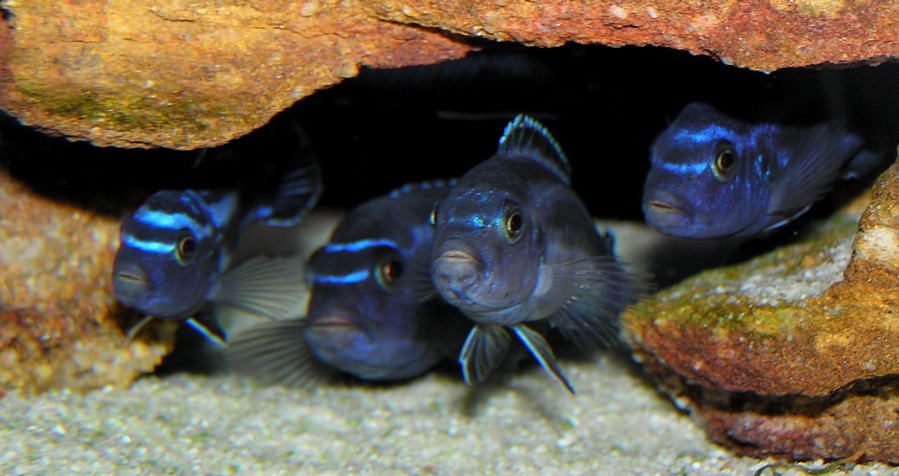

Conservation status
- Critically Endangered (IUCN 3.1)

Scientific classification
- Kingdom: Animalia
- Phylum: Chordata
- Class: Actinopterygii
- Order: Cichliformes
- Family: Cichlidae
- Genus: Pseudotropheus
- Species: P. cyaneorhabdos

Binomial name
- Pseudotropheus cyaneorhabdos (Bowers & Stauffer, 1997)

Synonyms
- Melanochromis cyaneorhabdos Bowers & Stauffer, 1997

= Pseudotropheus cyaneorhabdos =

Species of fish

Pseudotropheus cyaneorhabdos is a species of cichlid endemic to Lake Malawi where it is only known from around Likoma Island where it prefers rocky substrates at depths of from 5 to 10 metres (16 to 33 ft). This species can grow to a length of 7.5 centimetres (3.0 in) SL. Also known as Maingano, this mbuna is often confused with P. johannii. One important distinguishing characteristic is that females are not orange, whereas female P. johanii are. Both male & female P. cyaneorhabdos are colored the same; however, males may have more intense coloring, particularly in dominant or sexually active males. Another key distinguishing feature of P. cyaneorhabdos from P. johannii is the lack of vertical stripes. The horizontal stripes of P. cyaneorhabdos have been used to study the genetic control of phenotypic traits like coloration. It is a critically endangered species, mainly due to its popularity as an aquarium fish.

== See also ==
- List of freshwater aquarium fish species
