= Chindongo heteropictus =

Conservation status
- Least Concern (IUCN 3.1)

Scientific classification
- Kingdom: Animalia
- Phylum: Chordata
- Class: Actinopterygii
- Order: Cichliformes
- Family: Cichlidae
- Genus: Chindongo
- Species: C. heteropictus

Binomial name
- Chindongo heteropictus Staeck, 1980

Synonyms
- Pseudotropheus heteropicta Staeck, 1980; Maylandia heteropicta Staeck, 1980; Maylandia heteropictus Staeck, 1980; Metriaclima heteropictus Staeck, 1980

Species of fish

Chindongo heteropictus is a species of cichlid endemic to Lake Malawi, where it is only known from Thumbi West Island. This species can reach a length of 8.6 centimetres (3.4 in) SL. It can also be found in the aquarium trade.
