= Pseudotropheus perspicax =

Conservation status
- Least Concern (IUCN 3.1)

Scientific classification
- Kingdom: Animalia
- Phylum: Chordata
- Class: Actinopterygii
- Order: Cichliformes
- Family: Cichlidae
- Genus: Pseudotropheus
- Species: P. perspicax

Binomial name
- Pseudotropheus perspicax (Trewavas, 1935)

Synonyms
- Melanochromis perspicax Trewavas, 1935

Species of fish

Pseudotropheus perspicax is a species of cichlid endemic to Lake Malawi where it is known from Deep Bay. This species can reach a length of 8.1 centimetres (3.2 in) TL. It can also be found in the aquarium trade.
