= Pseudotropheus benetos =

Conservation status
- Least Concern (IUCN 3.1)

Scientific classification
- Kingdom: Animalia
- Phylum: Chordata
- Class: Actinopterygii
- Order: Cichliformes
- Family: Cichlidae
- Genus: Pseudotropheus
- Species: P. benetos

Binomial name
- Pseudotropheus benetos (Bowers & Stauffer, 1997)

Synonyms
- Melanochromis benetos Bowers & Stauffer, 1997

Species of fish

Pseudotropheus benetos is a species of cichlid endemic to Lake Malawi known only at Likoma Island as well as along the northwestern coast between Nkhata bay and Chilumba.
