= Alticorpus geoffreyi =

Conservation status
- Least Concern (IUCN 3.1)

Scientific classification
- Kingdom: Animalia
- Phylum: Chordata
- Class: Actinopterygii
- Order: Cichliformes
- Family: Cichlidae
- Genus: Alticorpus
- Species: A. geoffreyi

Binomial name
- Alticorpus geoffreyi Snoeks & Walapa, 2004

Species of fish

Alticorpus geoffreyi is a species of haplochromine cichlid which is endemic to Lake Malawi, where it is widely distributed and can be found at depths of 18–150 metres (59–492 ft), although it is most common below 60 metres (200 ft). The specific name honours the British carcinologist, ecologist and ichthyologist Geoffrey Fryer (b. 1927), who studied the fishes of Lake Malawi, especially the cichlids which occur in the rocky areas of the lake.
