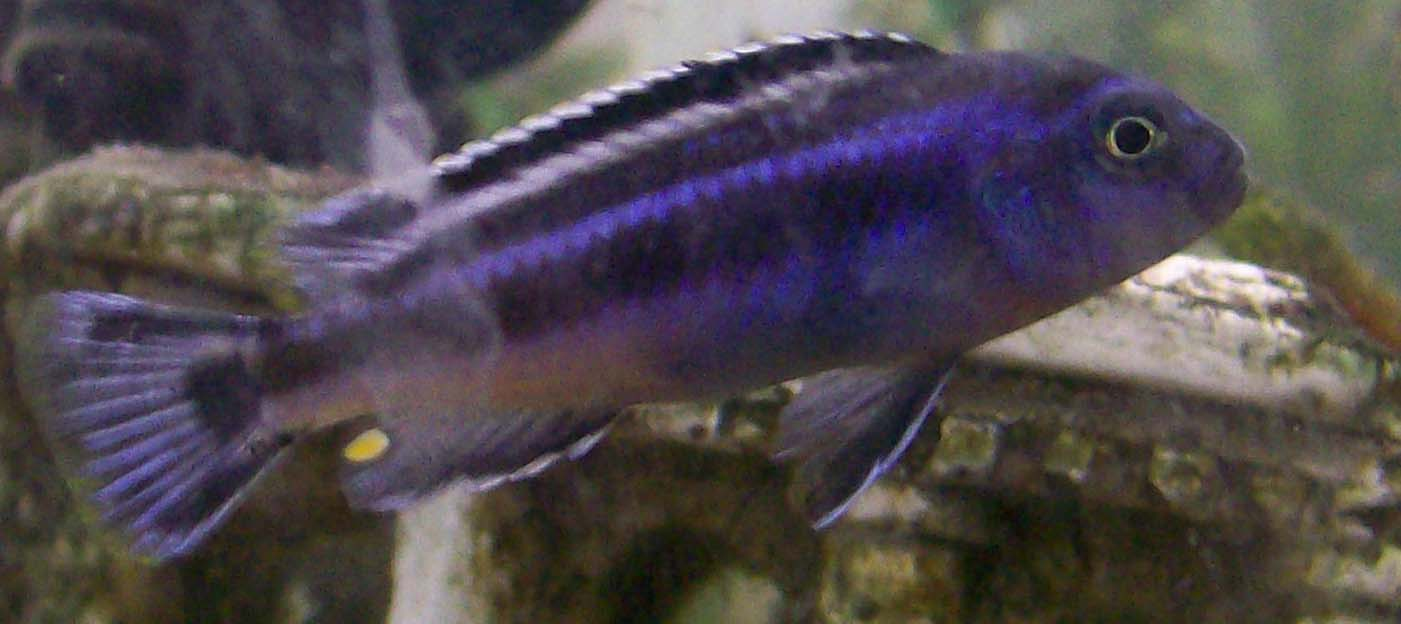

Conservation status
- Least Concern (IUCN 3.1)

Scientific classification
- Kingdom: Animalia
- Phylum: Chordata
- Class: Actinopterygii
- Order: Cichliformes
- Family: Cichlidae
- Genus: Pseudotropheus
- Species: P. johannii

Binomial name
- Pseudotropheus johannii Eccles, 1973

Synonyms
- Melanochromis johannii (Eccles, 1973)

= Pseudotropheus johannii =

Species of fish

Pseudotropheus johannii or the bluegray mbuna is an African freshwater fish from the family Cichlidae.

== Distribution and habitat ==
The species is endemic to littoral zones on the east, Mozambique coastline of Lake Malawi, south of Chuanga. The species is popular in the fishkeeping hobby and is frequently kept in cichlid aquariums. In the aquarium trade, the fish is known as the bluegray mbuna or the electric blue johanni.

== Description ==
The species is highly sexually dimorphic. Females and juveniles are yellow. The coloration of males is a combination of blue to purple and black, with one blue line running across the forehead, over the top of the eye and along the body above the mid-line, a second line appears below the mid-line.

== Name ==
The specific name of this fish is derived from the German name Johan, John in English, and honours John Johns who was a collector of fish from Lake Malawi for the aquarium trade.

== In the aquarium ==
This fish is an mbuna cichlid that lives in alkaline water with the PH of 7 to 9. It is a tropical fish and lives in temperatures from 22 to 28 °C (72 to 82 °F). The hardness of the water range from 10-20. They are very aggressive and are only kept with other similarly aggressive African cichlids, with one male to two or more females. It is not kept more than one male in the same tank, unless it is a large tank with many hiding places.

== See also ==
- List of freshwater aquarium fish species
