= Pseudotropheus purpuratus =

Conservation status
- Least Concern (IUCN 3.1)

Scientific classification
- Kingdom: Animalia
- Phylum: Chordata
- Class: Actinopterygii
- Order: Cichliformes
- Family: Cichlidae
- Genus: Pseudotropheus
- Species: P. purpuratus

Binomial name
- Pseudotropheus purpuratus D. S. Johnson, 1976

Species of fish

Pseudotropheus purpuratus is a species of cichlid endemic to Lake Malawi where it is known from Chisumulu Island. This species can reach a length of 10 centimetres (3.9 in) SL.
