= Lake Bisina =

Lake in Uganda

- Lake Salisbury, Lake Bisinia
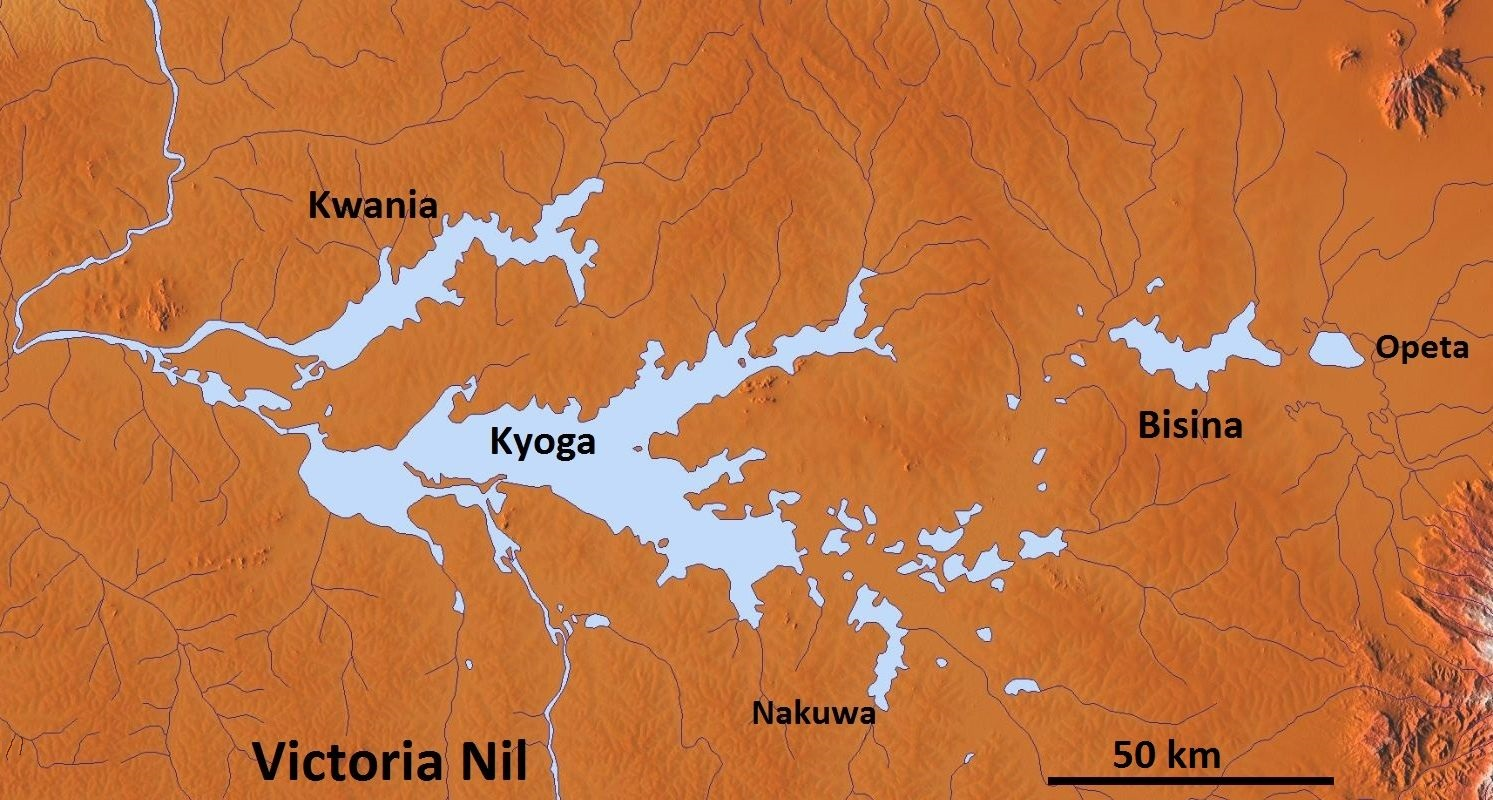
- Kyoga Lake Complex with the Bisina (right)

- Location within Uganda
- Coordinates: 1°36′28″N 33°57′43″E
- Primary inflows: Apedura River floodplain and seasonal streams from the surrounding catchment
- Primary outflows: Drains westwards toward Lake Kyoga through swampy margins and channels
- Basin countries: Uganda
- Max. length: 32 kilometres (20 mi)
- Max. width: 6 kilometres (3.7 mi)
- Max. depth: 5.0 metres (16.4 ft) (recorded at sampling locations, 2008–2009)
- Surface elevation: 1,050 metres (3,440 ft) a.s.l.
- Settlements: Mbale

Ramsar Wetland
- Official name: Lake Bisina Wetland System
- Designated: 15 September 2006
- Reference no.: 1633

Lake Bisina, also known as Lake Salisbury and Lake Bisinia, is a freshwater lake in eastern Uganda. It is a satellite lake of Lake Kyoga, which it drains into, and the two are to some extent directly connected by papyrus swamps. During the high-water rainy season, Lake Bisina can be up to 6 m (20 ft) deep and often directly connects with the smaller Lake Opeta, but during the dry season the two are clearly separated.

== Conservation and ecology ==
Lake Bisina is one of Uganda's 33 Important Bird Areas and since 2006 a Ramsar-listed wetland of international importance.

The lake is important for fish, notably several threatened haplochromine cichlids like Haplochromis orthostoma, H. argenteus (appears to have disappeared from its main range in Lake Victoria), H. latifasciatus, H. lividus, H. martini (appears to have disappeared from its main range in Lake Victoria), H. maxillaris, H. nubilus, H. parvidens, H. phytophagus and a number of undescribed species. Although Nile perch was introduced to Lake Bisina in the early 1970s, recent surveys have not detected this species, which has been implicated in the extinctions of many haplochromine cichlids elsewhere. A few tilapia species have also been introduced to Lake Bisina and they are still present, along with the native Singida and Victoria tilapias. Other, more widespread fish species found in Lake Bisina include marbled lungfish, and various species of catfish, African tetras and elephantfish.

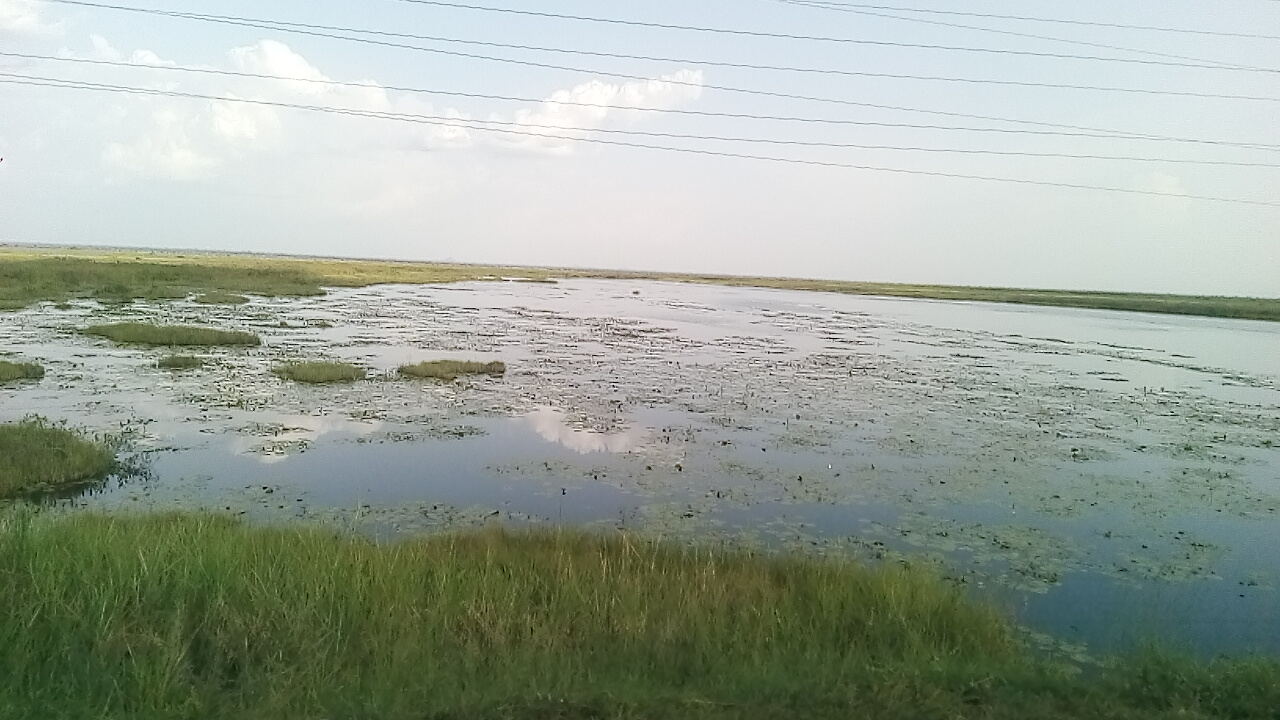
Lake Bisinia along Soroti Mbale Highway

Surveys of Lake Bisina’s aquatic plants recorded 15 vascular aquatic plant species plus Chara spp. (a multicellular green algae). The same study mapped aquatic plant patterns across the lake and reported plant communities associated with depth and water clarity gradients.

Lake Bisina’s wetlands support specialist wetland birds. NatureUganda surveys note breeding activity and the conservation importance of papyrus and seasonally flooded wetland habitats in the Bisina catchment. A targeted survey report records the Fox’s Weaver (Ploceus spekeoides) as a highly range-restricted species linked to seasonally flooded wetlands in north-eastern Uganda, including Lake Bisina’s catchment and fringes.

NatureUganda baseline reporting highlights pressures from cultivation, grazing, wetland conversion and sedimentation as key risks to wetland functions and biodiversity in the Bisina–Opeta wetland system. Species-focused field reports also point to habitat loss and modification in seasonally flooded wetlands as a core threat for restricted-range wetland birds recorded in the wider Lake Bisina catchment.

== Geography and hydrology ==
Lake Bisina lies about 15 km north of Kumi town and about 20 km east of Soroti. The lake covers about 192 km2 and sits around 1,050 m above sea level. It is surrounded by papyrus swamp and a broad floodplain linked to the Apedura River, which drains parts of Karamoja toward the lake system.

The lake is shallow. In field sampling between February 2008 and August 2009, depths at sampling locations ranged from 0.6 to 5.0 m, with an average of 2.89 m.

== Ramsar and Important Bird Area status ==
The Lake Bisina Wetland System was designated a Ramsar Site on 15 September 2006. The Ramsar Site covers 54,229 ha and is listed for Kumi, Katakwi and Soroti districts. Lake Bisina and the wider Bisina–Opeta wetland complex are also described as Important Bird Areas in Uganda’s site-based conservation work.

== People and livelihoods ==
Communities around the Bisina–Opeta system rely on wetland resources. Local uses documented in baseline work include fishing, livestock watering, and harvesting of wetland materials, alongside expanding settlement and cultivation on marginal wetland areas. Baseline reporting also links increased siltation and reduced flood-buffer functions to land and catchment pressures, including degradation in upstream catchments feeding the system.

== See also ==
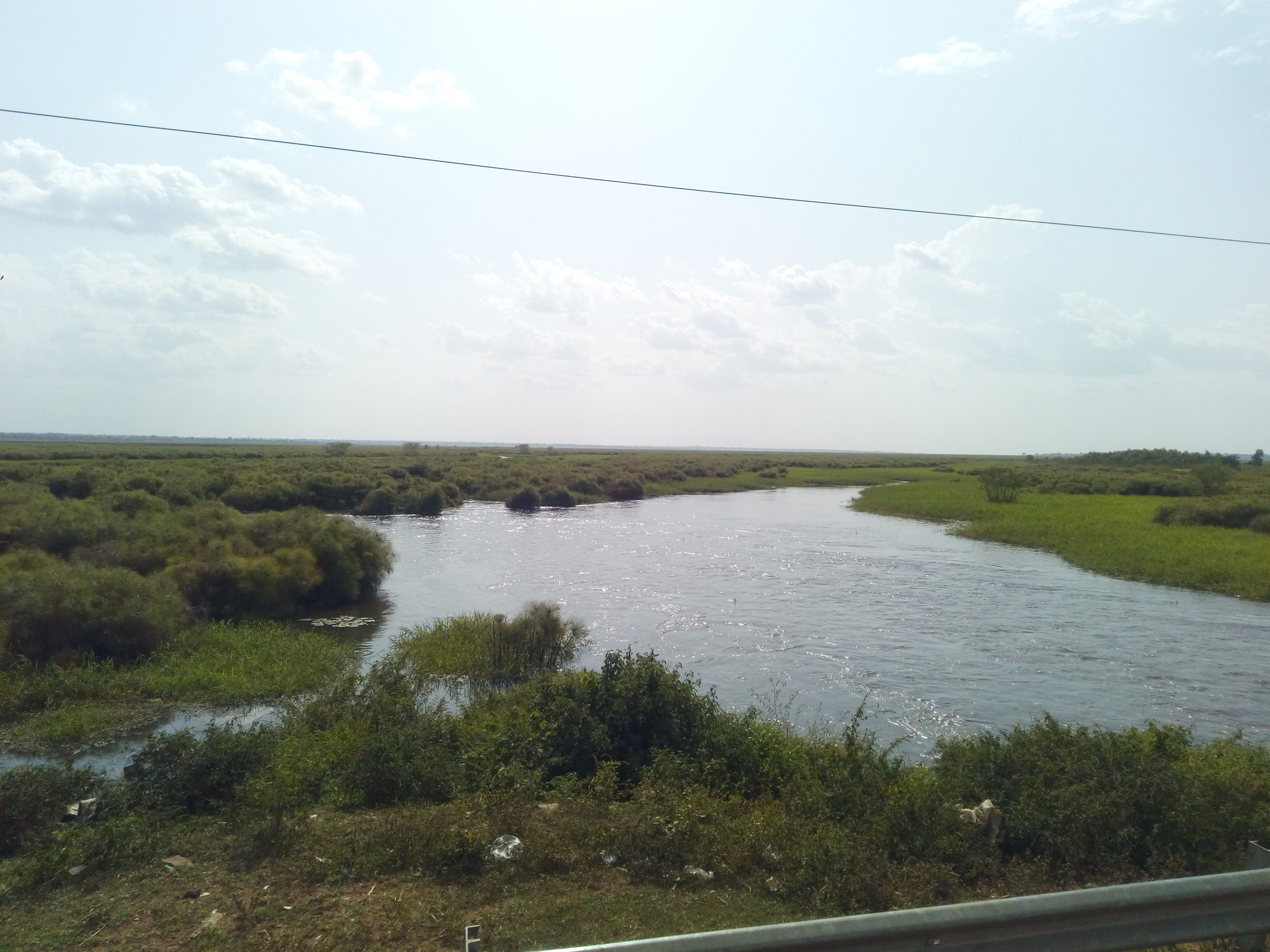
- Photo of Lake Bisinia Swamp
  Kapir Atiira, village located near Lake Bisina
- Lake Kyoga
- Lake Opeta
