= Alticorpus macrocleithrum =

Conservation status
- Least Concern (IUCN 3.1)

Scientific classification
- Kingdom: Animalia
- Phylum: Chordata
- Class: Actinopterygii
- Order: Cichliformes
- Family: Cichlidae
- Genus: Alticorpus
- Species: A. macrocleithrum

Binomial name
- Alticorpus macrocleithrum (Stauffer & McKaye, 1985)

Species of fish

Alticorpus macrocleithrum is a species of fish in the family Cichlidae. It is endemic to Lake Malawi, where it can be found at depths between 30 and 150 metres (98 and 492 ft). This species differs from all other species of Alticorpus by the presence of a prominent ventral protuberance of the cleithrum on the chest, hence the name macrocleithrum.

Like all members of Alticorpus, A. macrocleithrum has enlarged lateral pores on the lower part of the head. The feeding technique of these species is to 'listen' for any movements within the sediment. Once they have located a prey buried in the sediment, they will dart at it, picking it out of the sediment. The enlarged cleithrum found throughout these species acts as a base for the enlarged musculature needed to pull themselves free of the sediment once buried into it from chasing prey. Their diet can consist of many small organisms including crustaceans, larvae etc.
