= Pseudotropheus brevis =

Conservation status
- Endangered (IUCN 3.1)

Scientific classification
- Kingdom: Animalia
- Phylum: Chordata
- Class: Actinopterygii
- Order: Cichliformes
- Family: Cichlidae
- Genus: Pseudotropheus
- Species: P. brevis

Binomial name
- Pseudotropheus brevis (Trewavas, 1935)

Synonyms
- Melanochromis brevis Trewavas, 1935

Species of fish

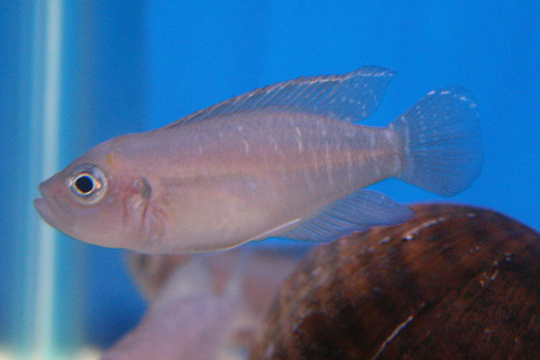
Neolamprologus brevis sunspot 2049.

Pseudotropheus brevis is a species of cichlid endemic to Lake Malawi where it is found in Nkudzi Bay and Monkey Bay in rocky areas. This species can reach a length of 12 centimetres (4.7 in) SL. It can also be found in the aquarium trade.
