= List of cichlid fish of South America =

This is a list of South American cichlid species that are commonly kept by aquarists.

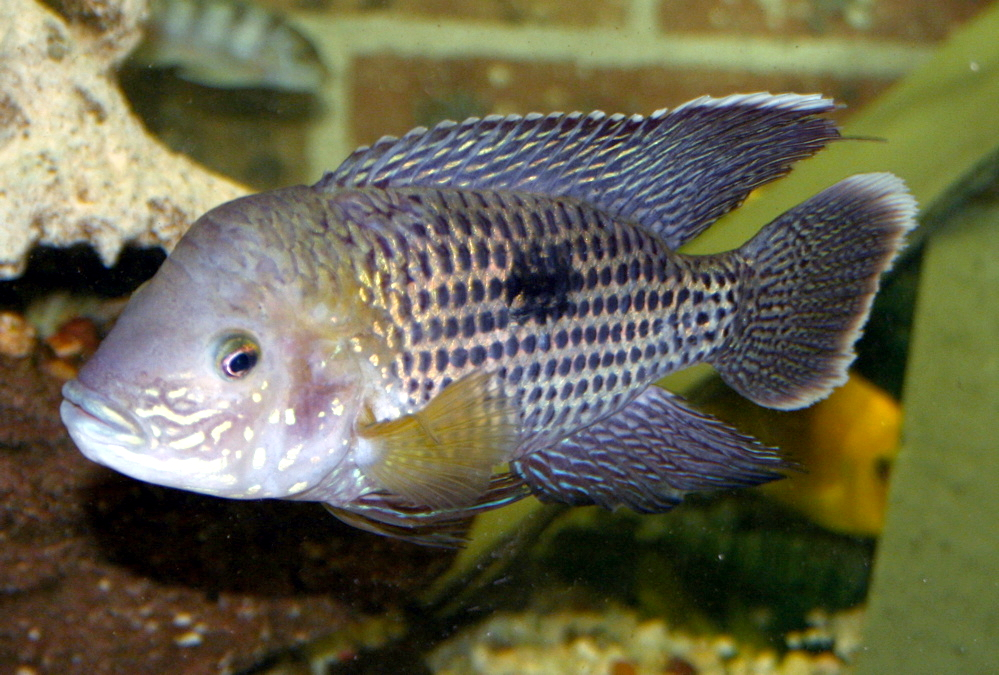
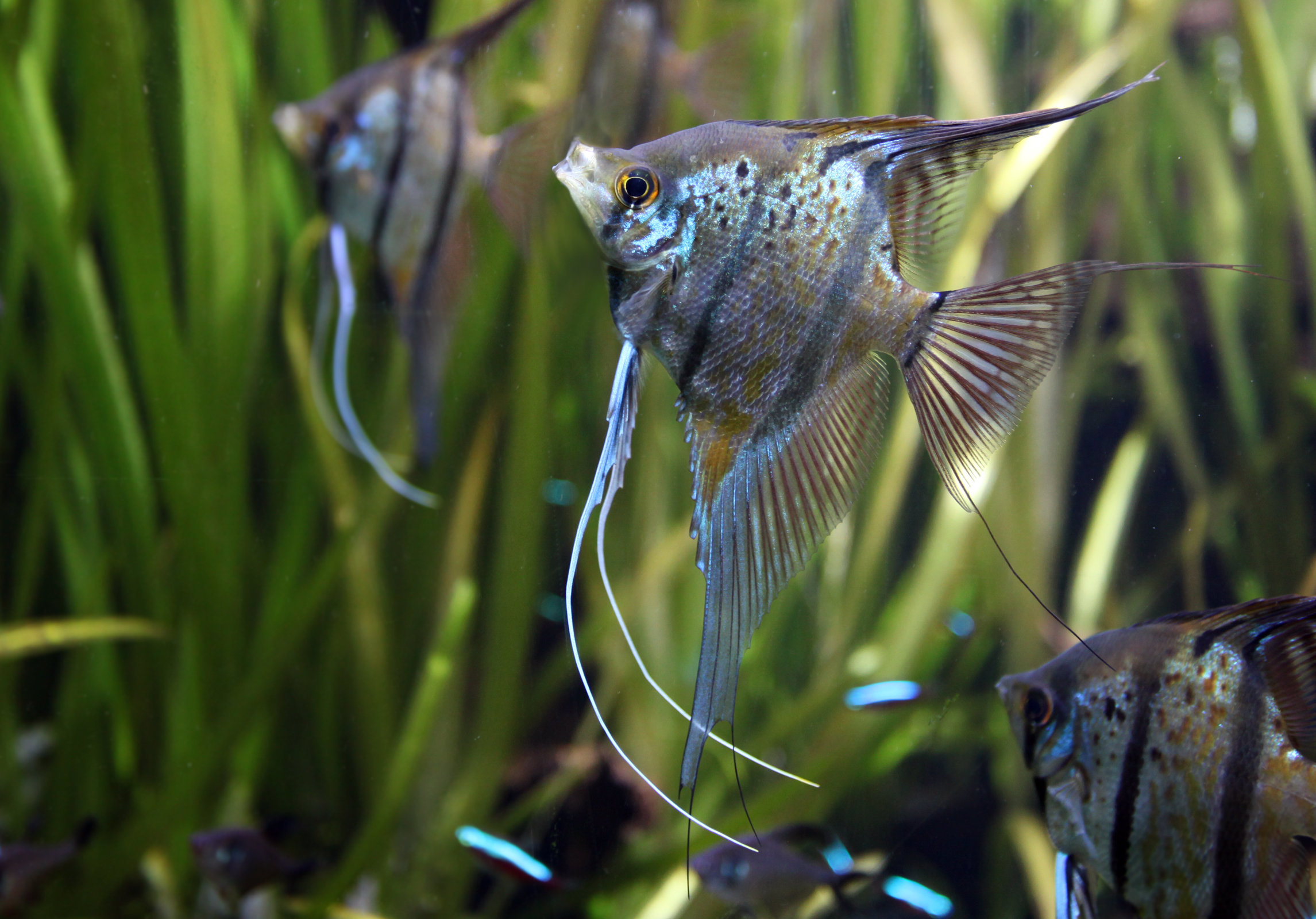
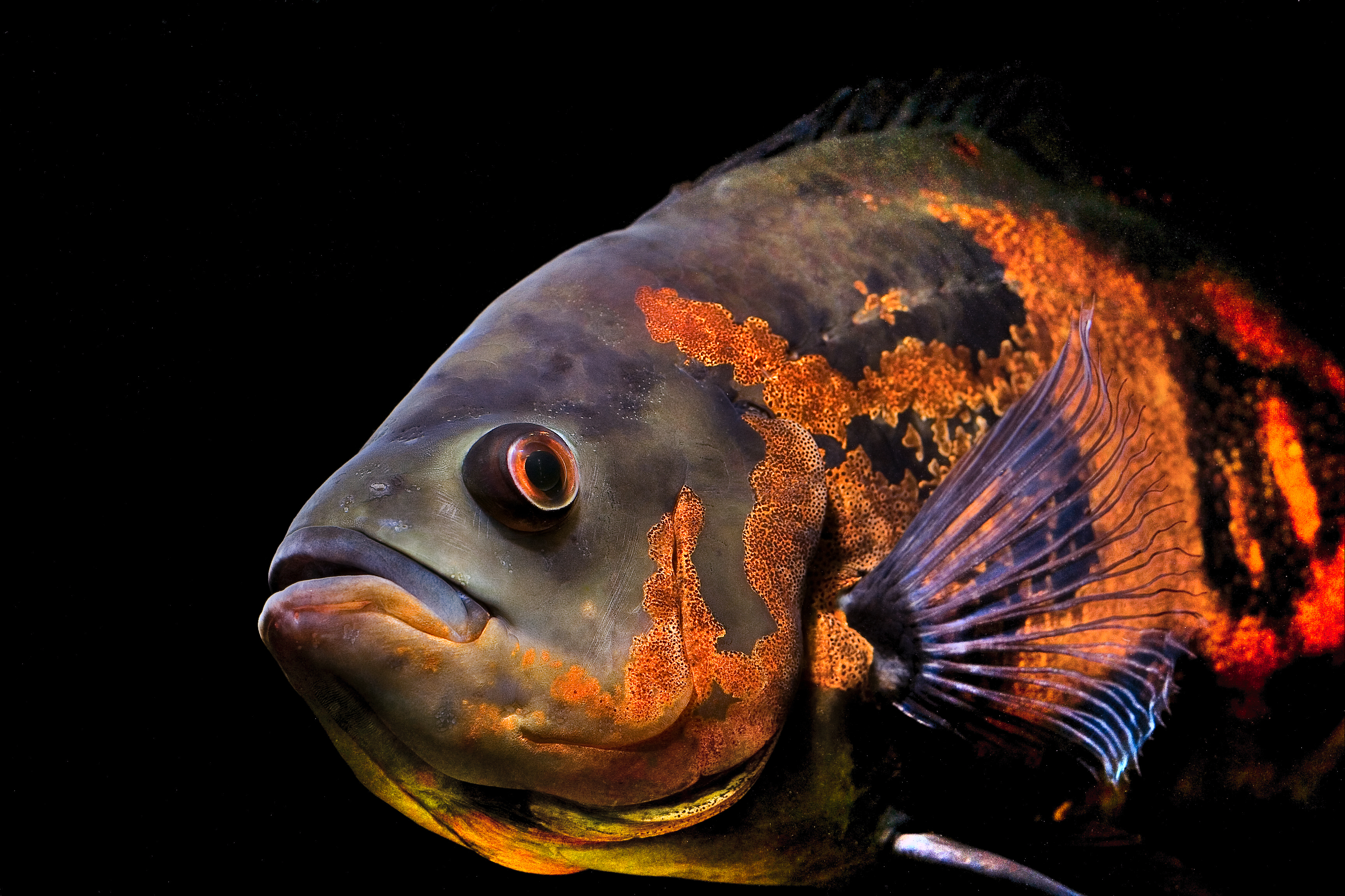
Cichlid species
Picture	Common name	Species	Region	Size	Aggression	Level	Description
	Green Terror	Aequidens rivulatus	North-West South America	12 inch or 30.48 cm	Moderate	Bottom	Males grow much larger than females
	Freshwater Angelfish	Pterophyllum scalare	North-Central South America	3.937 inch or 10 cm	Moderate; safe for community aquaria, but can be territorial with members of its own species	Midwater/Throughout	Comes in a variety of colors/patterns
	Oscar	Astronotus ocellatus	Amazon Basin and The Guianas	18 inches or 45.72 cm	Moderate, commonly thought to be aggressive, but not really	Midwater	The wild-caught forms of the species are typically darkly coloured with yellow-ringed spots or ocelli on the caudal peduncle and on the dorsal fin.

== See also ==
- List of freshwater aquarium fish species, a more comprehensive list of South America cichlids
- List of African cichlids
- Aquarium
