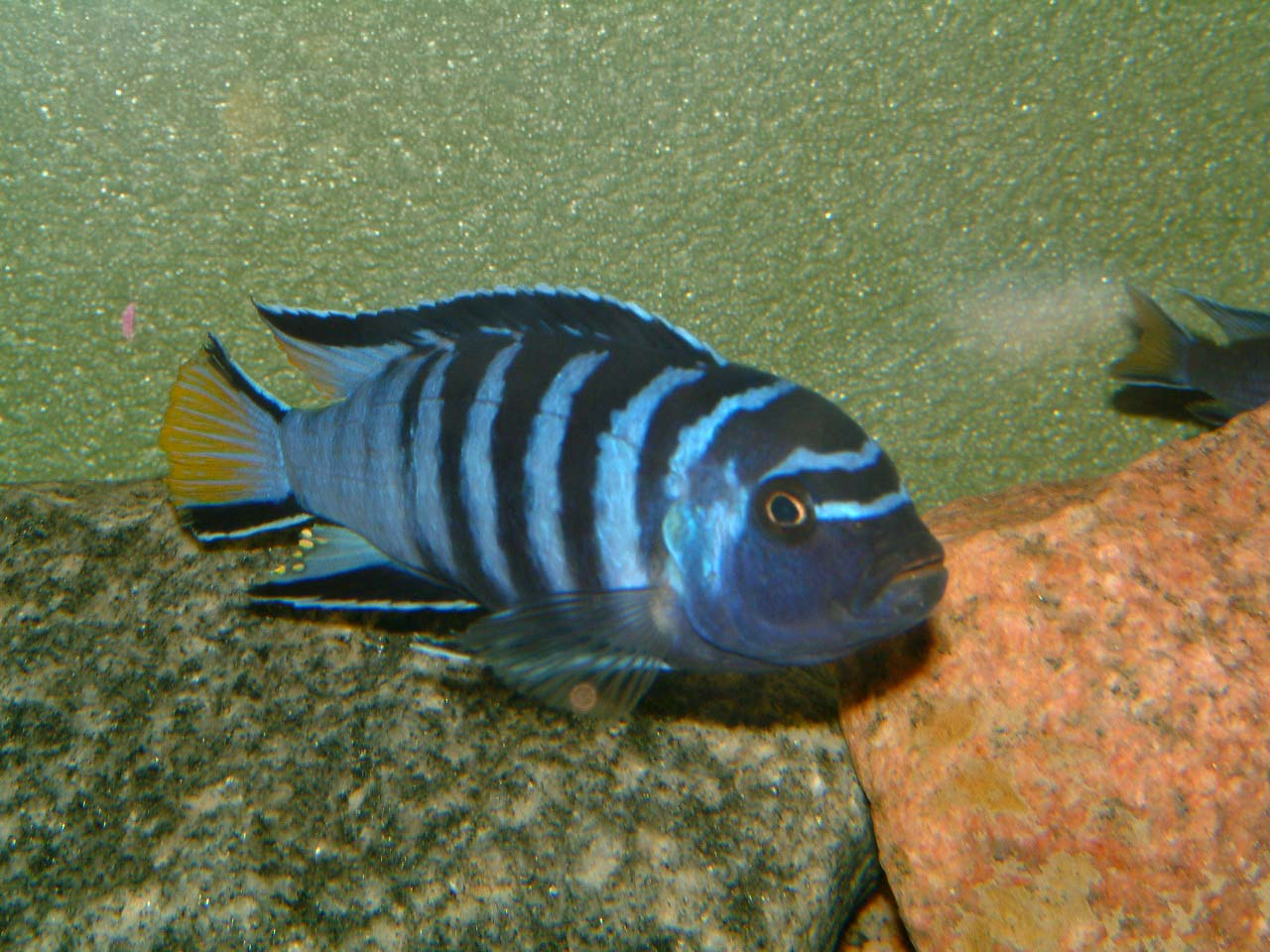

Conservation status
- Near Threatened (IUCN 3.1)

Scientific classification
- Kingdom: Animalia
- Phylum: Chordata
- Class: Actinopterygii
- Order: Cichliformes
- Family: Cichlidae
- Genus: Chindongo
- Species: C. elongatus

Binomial name
- Chindongo elongatus Fryer, 1956

Synonyms
- Pseudotropheus elongatus (Fryer, 1956)

= Elongate mbuna =

Species of fish

The elongate mbuna (Chindongo elongatus) is a species of cichlid endemic to Lake Malawi where it is known from Mkata Bay and Mbamba Bay. It prefers areas with rocky substrates where it can graze on algae. It can reach a length of 9.5 centimetres (3.7 in) SL. It can also be found in the aquarium trade.
