= Pseudotropheus elegans =

Conservation status
- Least Concern (IUCN 3.1)

Scientific classification
- Kingdom: Animalia
- Phylum: Chordata
- Class: Actinopterygii
- Order: Cichliformes
- Family: Cichlidae
- Genus: Pseudotropheus
- Species: P. elegans

Binomial name
- Pseudotropheus elegans Trewavas, 1935

Synonyms
- Maylandia elegans Trewavas, 1935

Species of fish

Pseudotropheus elegans is a species of cichlid endemic to Lake Malawi. This species can reach a length of 13.2 centimetres (5.2 in) SL. It can also be found in the aquarium trade.
