= Alticorpus profundicola =

Conservation status
- Data Deficient (IUCN 3.1)

Scientific classification
- Kingdom: Animalia
- Phylum: Chordata
- Class: Actinopterygii
- Order: Cichliformes
- Family: Cichlidae
- Genus: Alticorpus
- Species: A. profundicola

Binomial name
- Alticorpus profundicola Stauffer & McKaye, 1988

Synonyms
- Alticorpus profundicula (misspelling)

Species of fish

Alticorpus profundicola is a species of haplochromine cichlid which is endemic to Lake Malawi.
