= Alticorpus =

Scientific classification
- Domain: Eukaryota
- Kingdom: Animalia
- Phylum: Chordata
- Class: Actinopterygii
- Order: Cichliformes
- Family: Cichlidae
- Tribe: Haplochromini
- Genus: Alticorpus; Stauffer & McKaye, 1988

Type species
- Alticorpus mentale Stauffer & McKaye, 1988

Genus of fishes

Alticorpus is a small genus of cichlids endemic to the deep waters of Lake Malawi in Africa.

== Species ==
There are currently five or six recognized species in this genus:

- Alticorpus geoffreyi Snoeks & Walapa, 2004
- Alticorpus macrocleithrum (Stauffer & McKaye, 1985)
- Alticorpus mentale Stauffer & McKaye, 1988
- Alticorpus peterdaviesi (W. E. Burgess & H. R. Axelrod, 1973)
- Alticorpus profundicola Stauffer & McKaye, 1988
