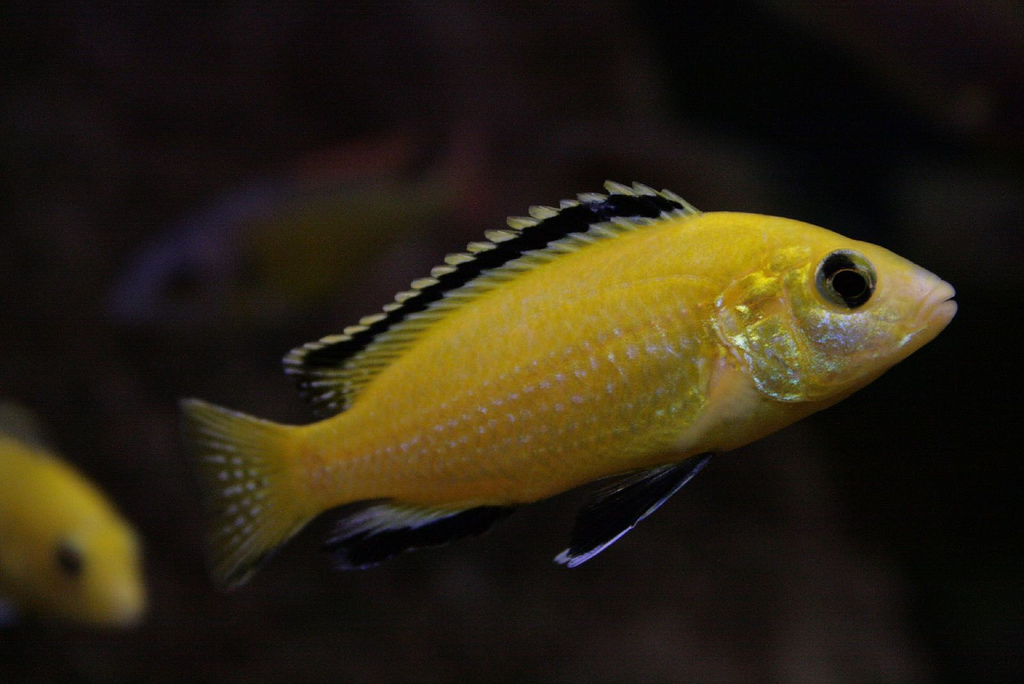
- The naturally occurring yellow morph of L. caeruleus is popular with aquarium hobbyists.

Conservation status
- Least Concern (IUCN 3.1)

Scientific classification
- Kingdom: Animalia
- Phylum: Chordata
- Class: Actinopterygii
- Order: Cichliformes
- Family: Cichlidae
- Genus: Labidochromis
- Species: L. caeruleus

Binomial name
- Labidochromis caeruleus Fryer, 1956

= Labidochromis caeruleus =

Species of fish endemic to part of Lake Malawi

Labidochromis caeruleus is a species of cichlid endemic to the central western coastal region of Lake Malawi in East Africa. It has many common names, such as lemon yellow lab, the blue streak hap, the electric yellow or yellow prince, depending on the colour morph. The naturally occurring yellow-coloured variant from Lion's Cove is one of the most popular cichlids amongst aquarium hobbyists.

Electric yellows inhabit water with a pH between 7.8 and 8.9 and an ideal temperature range of 23–26 °C (73.4–78.8 °F). Large males may reach 15 centimetres (5.9 in) in length.

== Description ==
FishBase lists a maximum length of 8.1 centimetres (3.2 in), although other sources state a larger size of 10 to 15 centimetres (3.9 to 5.9 in).

== Reproduction ==
This species, like the Astatotilapia burtoni, is a maternal mouthbrooder, meaning the eggs are carried, hatch, and develop in the mother's mouth (buccal cavity), for about three weeks. These fish are ovophiles and the male will excavate a pit in the sand within his territory, in which the female lays the eggs; the female then takes these eggs into her mouth for fertilization.

== Aquarium care ==
Electric yellows are peaceful compared to most other African cichlids. Despite this, like all cichlids from Lake Malawi, they are best kept in specialist cichlid aquariums with other Mbuna. As with most cichlids, electric yellows should not be kept with freshwater community aquarium species such as Zebra Danios or Neon Tetras, they may nip the finnage of other peaceful species, and are not recommended for freshwater community aquariums because of the differences in the natural habitats between African Lake cichlids and other fish species. This fish is more suited to an African lake cichlid community consisting of other Malawi species. In an aquarium setting, their natural habitat of rocks and caves should be emulated with a sandy substrate. Their diet should consist mostly of prepared cichlid pellets or flakes, supplemented with foods like krill, bloodworms, brineshrimp, and Spirulina flakes. Refrain from feeding these cichlids feeder goldfish, as they are likely carrying diseases that will cause harm to your cichlids.

== See also ==
- Mbuna
- List of freshwater aquarium fish species
