= Pseudotropheus interruptus =

Conservation status
- Near Threatened (IUCN 3.1)

Scientific classification
- Kingdom: Animalia
- Phylum: Chordata
- Class: Actinopterygii
- Order: Cichliformes
- Family: Cichlidae
- Genus: Pseudotropheus
- Species: P. interruptus

Binomial name
- Pseudotropheus interruptus (D. S. Johnson, 1975)

Synonyms
- Melanochromis elastodema Bowers & Stauffer, 1997; Melanochromis interruptus Johnson, 1975

Species of fish

Pseudotropheus interruptus is a species of cichlid in the Cichlidae endemic to Lake Malawi where it is only known from Likoma Island. This species can reach a length of 9.8 centimetres (3.9 in) TL. It can also be found in the aquarium trade.
