= Ovophile =

Group of fishes

Ovophiles are mouthbrooding members of the fish family Cichlidae (cichlids). Ovophiles dig pits or holes in which the female lays eggs. The female lays eggs in this pit and then immediately takes the eggs into her mouth. The male then fertilizes the eggs in the female's mouth. In some species, the male's anal fin is covered with circular markings that, to a female, look confusingly like eggs. Female will attempt to bring the male's tail into their mouth and, at the right moment, the male will ejaculate into their mouths, fertilizing the eggs. Examples including the include the Aulonocara, Haplochromis and Pseudotropheus, and Labidochromis caeruleus.
