= Pseudotropheus tursiops =

Conservation status
- Near Threatened (IUCN 3.1)

Scientific classification
- Kingdom: Animalia
- Phylum: Chordata
- Class: Actinopterygii
- Order: Cichliformes
- Family: Cichlidae
- Genus: Pseudotropheus
- Species: P. tursiops

Binomial name
- Pseudotropheus tursiops W. E. Burgess & H. R. Axelrod, 1975

Species of fish

Pseudotropheus tursiops is a species of cichlid endemic to Lake Malawi where it is only known from Chisumulu Island. It prefers areas with rocky substrates at depths of about 5 metres (16 ft). This species can reach a length of 9.4 centimetres (3.7 in) SL. It can also be found in the aquarium trade.
