= Pseudotropheus perileucos =

Conservation status
- Least Concern (IUCN 3.1)

Scientific classification
- Kingdom: Animalia
- Phylum: Chordata
- Class: Actinopterygii
- Order: Cichliformes
- Family: Cichlidae
- Genus: Pseudotropheus
- Species: P. perileucos

Binomial name
- Pseudotropheus perileucos (Bowers & Stauffer, 1997)

Synonyms
- Melanochromis perileucos Bowers & Stauffer, 1997

Species of fish

Pseudotropheus perileucos is a species of cichlid endemic to Lake Malawi only known to occur around Likoma Island where it prefers rocky habitats, sometimes near to the interface with sandy substrates. This species can grow to a length of 8 centimetres (3.1 in) SL.
