= Pseudotropheus galanos =

Conservation status
- Near Threatened (IUCN 3.1)

Scientific classification
- Kingdom: Animalia
- Phylum: Chordata
- Class: Actinopterygii
- Order: Cichliformes
- Family: Cichlidae
- Genus: Pseudotropheus
- Species: P. galanos

Binomial name
- Pseudotropheus galanos Stauffer & Kellogg, 2002

Species of fish

Pseudotropheus galanos is a species of cichlid endemic to Lake Malawi. This species can reach a length of 8.8 centimetres (3.5 in) SL.
