= Pseudotropheus minutus =

Conservation status
- Least Concern (IUCN 3.1)

Scientific classification
- Kingdom: Animalia
- Phylum: Chordata
- Class: Actinopterygii
- Order: Cichliformes
- Family: Cichlidae
- Genus: Pseudotropheus
- Species: P. minutus

Binomial name
- Pseudotropheus minutus Fryer, 1956

Species of fish

Pseudotropheus minutus is a species of cichlid endemic to Lake Malawi. It prefers areas with rocky substrates where it can feed on algae, particularly in areas other species cannot access. It can reach a length of 6.6 centimetres (2.6 in) SL. It can also be found in the aquarium trade.
