= Alticorpus peterdaviesi =

Conservation status
- Least Concern (IUCN 3.1)

Scientific classification
- Kingdom: Animalia
- Phylum: Chordata
- Class: Actinopterygii
- Order: Cichliformes
- Family: Cichlidae
- Genus: Alticorpus
- Species: A. peterdaviesi

Binomial name
- Alticorpus peterdaviesi (W. E. Burgess & H. R. Axelrod, 1973)

Synonyms
- Trematocranus peterdaviesi Burgess & Axelrod, 1973; Lethrinops peterdaviesi (Burgess & Axelrod, 1973); Alticorpus pectinatum Stauffer & McKaye, 1988

Species of fish

Alticorpus peterdaviesi is a species of fish in the family of Cichlidae. It is endemic to Lake Malawi. It is found in the southern part of the lake, in areas where the substrate consists of "diatom ooze" and diatoms probably form the major part of its diet.

== Etymology ==
The specific name honours Peter Davies, an exporter of live fish from Lake Malawi who provided great assistance to the authors.
