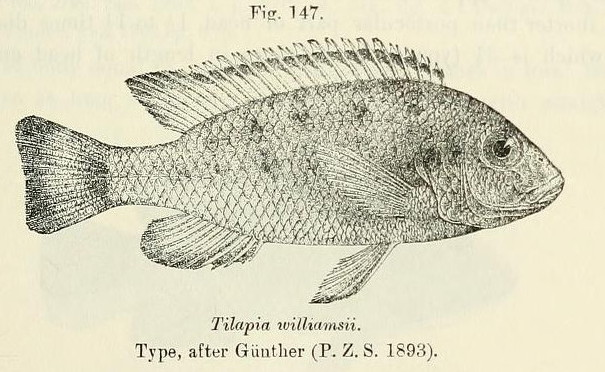

Conservation status
- Near Threatened (IUCN 3.1)

Scientific classification
- Kingdom: Animalia
- Phylum: Chordata
- Class: Actinopterygii
- Order: Cichliformes
- Family: Cichlidae
- Genus: Pseudotropheus
- Species: P. williamsi

Binomial name
- Pseudotropheus williamsi (Günther, 1894)

Synonyms
- Chromis williamsi Günther, 1894; Tilapia williamsi (Günther, 1894)

= Red top williamsi =

Species of fish

The red top williamsi (Pseudotropheus williamsi) is a species of cichlid endemic to Lake Malawi where it occurs in areas with rocky substrates usually at depths of less than 2 metres (6.6 ft). This species can reach a length of 16.5 centimetres (6.5 in) TL. It can also be found in the aquarium trade. The specific name honours the Anglican missionary Joseph A . Williams who died by drowning in Lake Malawi in 1895, with Bishop Chauncy Maples, and who collected the type of the cichlid among others.
