= Alticorpus mentale =

Conservation status
- Least Concern (IUCN 3.1)

Scientific classification
- Kingdom: Animalia
- Phylum: Chordata
- Class: Actinopterygii
- Order: Cichliformes
- Family: Cichlidae
- Genus: Alticorpus
- Species: A. mentale

Binomial name
- Alticorpus mentale Stauffer & McKaye, 1988

Species of fish

Alticorpus mentale is a species of haplochromine cichlid in the family Cichlidae. It is endemic to Lake Malawi, occurring in the southern part of the lake within Malawi. Its natural habitat is freshwater lakes.
