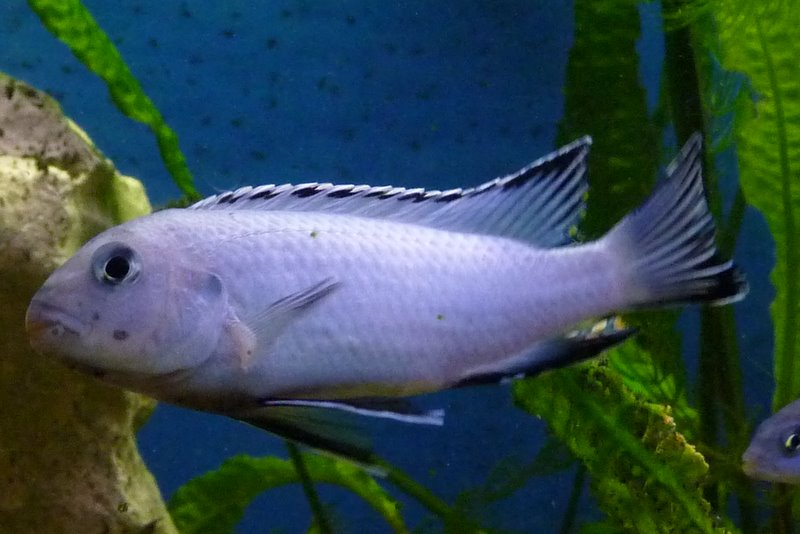
- Chindongo socolofi

Conservation status
- Least Concern (IUCN 3.1)

Scientific classification
- Kingdom: Animalia
- Phylum: Chordata
- Class: Actinopterygii
- Order: Cichliformes
- Family: Cichlidae
- Genus: Pseudotropheus
- Species: P. socolofi

Binomial name
- Pseudotropheus socolofi D. S. Johnson, 1974

Synonyms
- Chindongo socolofi (D.S. Johnson, 1974)

= Pindani =

Species of fish

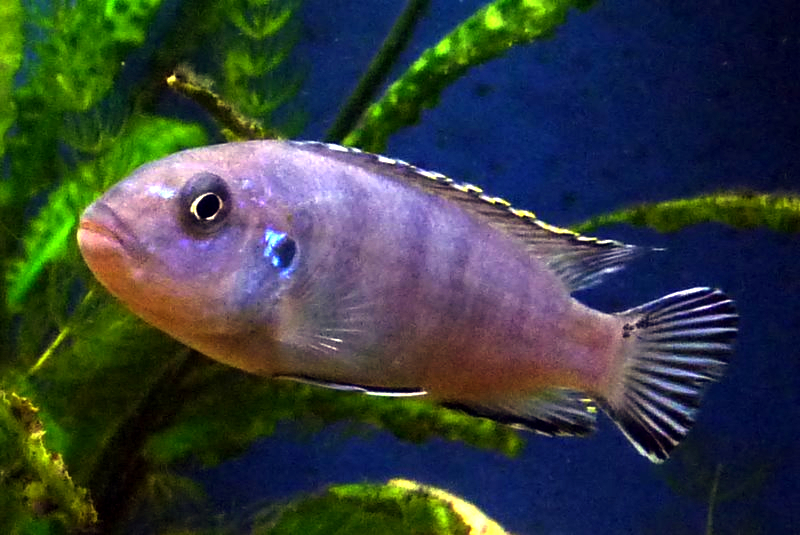
Female

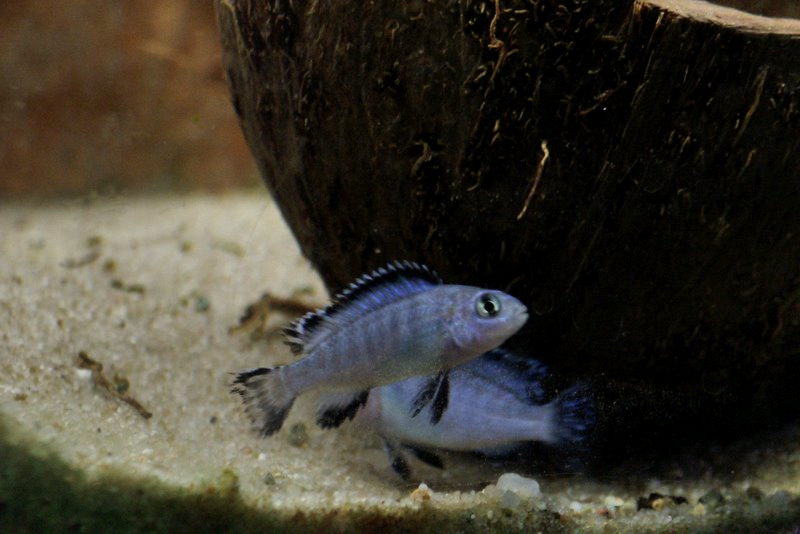
Fight of juvenile fishes

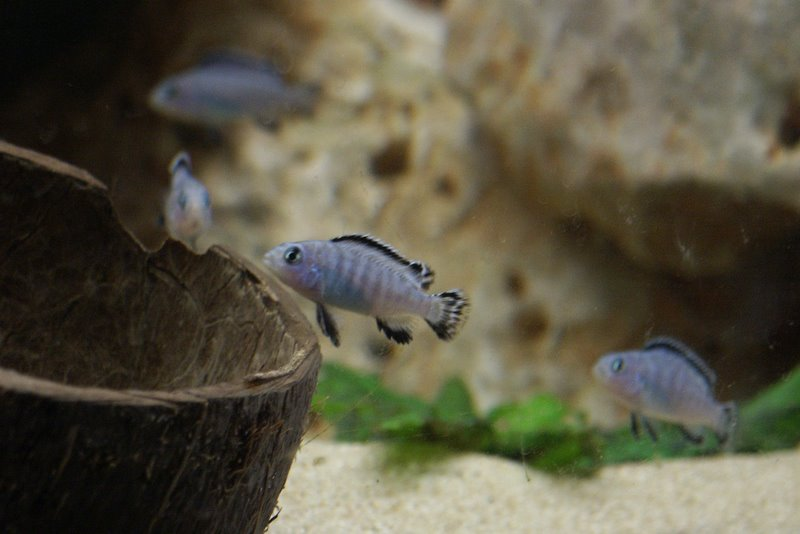
Juvenile fishes

The pindani (Pseudotropheus socolofi) is a species of cichlid endemic to Lake Malawi preferring areas with sandy substrates and nearby rocks where the males establish their territories. This species can reach a length of 6.7 centimetres (2.6 in) SL. It can also be found in the aquarium trade.

== Etymology ==
The specific name of this fish honours the aquarium fish trader Ross Socolof (1925-2009).
