= Fish aggression =

Agonistic behaviors

Aggression refers to agonistic behaviors characterized by threats and physical force. Methods of aggression in fish vary widely by species, but some common examples are chasing, charging, biting, fin display, color changes, and flared gills. Aggression is an important evolutionary pressure that increases an individual's access to resources while reducing overall conflict within the social group. Fish use aggressive behaviors to defend a territory, establish dominance, appeal to potential mates, and protect their young.

Aggressive behavior comes in two forms: threat displays and attacks. Attacking is how two competitors can directly compare their strength by biting or head-bumping, but it comes with significant drawbacks: it's energetically costly, time consuming, and risking bodily injury. A threat display, on the other hand, allows competitors to assess the other's strength indirectly, making it a safer way to settle conspecific conflict.

During a confrontation, threat displays communicate the factors that would tip a physical fight, such as body-size, dominance status, motivation, and territoriality. While displays are less risky than attacks, they still come with a cost. Many fish will make their heads look larger by pushing out their opercula, but this also makes it difficult to breathe. Aggressive behaviors might invite the attention of predators, and time spent challenging a competitor means time lost foraging, courting, or caring for young. Therefore, some fish will choose to end an aggressive encounter immediately by signaling submission.

== Territorial aggression ==
Fish territories are defended areas generally ruled by a single individual or by breeding pairs. The guarded resource may include food, shelter, sexual partner or offspring. While protecting their regions, fish often display aggressive behavior against their intruders. The territory owner strikes at competing fish directly ending in a bite, or a bump. Such aggressive behavior is seen in large juveniles, females and other fish of the same kind from the same area. For example, the three-spine stickleback (Gasterosteus aculeatus) is polygynous, with males preferring two or more female mates in their territory. Thus, males are highly aggressive so they have access to females in a particular territory, which also leads to intrasexual selection among males. Intrasexual selection is selection within the same sex. For instance, some male animals compete against one another, physically, for access to females for their kind. So, characteristics like a long tail, sharp teeth or similar weaponry that can be used against other males of the same species as means of mating with females is a selective advantage.

There is a deep relationship between the aggression in fish and the size of the regions owned by them. In a smaller territory, female fish often disappear before mating. Female fish are not bound to mate with a particular fish. If by chance a female is attracted to another male, she can dump the previous partner without any hesitation. In this situation, the ditched male fish becomes more aggressive to find mates in order to reproduce. Their levels of aggression increase more when the rates of sneaking by rival males go up too. The sneaking males enter the nest and release their own sperm over the eggs of the breeding fish. The rival fish here are using alternative reproduction methods like parental, sneaker or satellite to avoid being hurt by breeding males. On the other hand, the breeding males have higher mating success and endure less looting of eggs in large territories. Once the eggs have been gathered, the breeding males decrease their territories to protect their offspring from the predators during their parental phase. After the eggs have hatched, the males continue to show similar or more invasive behavior due to increased reproductive value of offspring and the awareness of newly hatched young fish against enemies.

Territorial aggression can take place not only due to the pressure of mating, producing offspring, or intruders, but also from light intensity. The term intensity is used to describe the rate at which light spreads over a surface of a given area some distance from a source. At lower light levels, the risk of losing resources like food and mates gives rise to aggressive behavior among the fish belonging to a territory. Additionally, for further understanding on how the rate of aggression and distance among neighboring fish varies with nighttime light intensities in the same area, Sveinn Valdimarsson and Neil Metcalfe conducted an experiment with the juveniles of Atlantic salmon (Salmo salar). At the beginning, S. salar were exposed to four different nighttime light intensities (0.00, 0.01, 0.50 and 1.00 lx) for 24 hours. From the result, it was concluded that fish showed less aggression when the intensity of the light was lower. This is because when the level of light was intense, due to darkness of night the territorial fish failed to detect their food or other members in the same area. So they decreased their territory size and remained closer to each other rather than attacking. This was a good example of evolution of cooperation among the fish. Additionally, as the light intensities of the light increased, those fish could see each other to defend their space. The territory size increases during bright lights. In short, the aggressive behavior of the salmon toward their rivals is highly manipulated by light intensities. Thus, the size of the space that the fish is defending increases or decreases between day and night.

== Sex-specific aggression ==
Male and female fish both get involved in aggressive confrontation. Yet varying selection pressures affecting each sex result in gender differences in aggressive syndrome during competition. Aggressive syndrome is a social condition describing an individual's need to show his distaste or dislike against certain individuals. Adult female fish usually gather in groups, including adult females and non-reproductive males. Aggressive behavior is displayed in females especially when the female fish attack each other directly. Dominance relationships can take place among female association. For instance, females of higher status (size) have better opportunities to mate than minors residing in the same group. Then females become aggressive when there are two dominant females trying to select the same male fish for mating. This selection can be based on intersexual selection, which is selection between two sexes. Females use such selection while choosing mates with good genes. For example, female peacocks tend to prefer male peacocks with bright plumage. The females think that if they mate with males with bright plumage, the offspring will have similar characteristics.

S. Josefin Dahlbom and colleagues experimented on zebra fish (Danio rerio) to study the difference in aggression level between males and females if they are put together under similar environment. For this test, fish were paired with one of the same sex. As the experiment continued, it was observed that both dominant males and females increase their aggression level until day four. On the fifth day, the dominant female members in the group stopped being aggressive. The authors suggested that this could be because the subordinate females stopped challenging the dominant female early in the study, and thereby the dominant female did not need to prove her superiority. In contrast, male subordinates continued fighting against the dominant males. As a result, the dominant males showed more aggression to suppress the subordinate males and to maintain their position among others.

In the paper ‘Gender differences in aggressive behavior in convict cichlids’ Gareth Arnott and Robert W. Elwood investigated if gender related variations in aggression are seen in convict cichlids (Amatitlania nigrofasciata). To see gender-related changes in aggression, they tested if intersexual agonistic events take place between isolated males and females, who were not previously paired to each other as breeding partners. At the end, it was detected that in terms of encroachment, Texas cichlids males used lateral display along with tail biting; whereas, the females used frontal display with biting. These two different displays have an explanation. Convict cichlids generally use either their left or right eye while swimming. Therefore, these fish use either their left or right hemisphere of the brain. Aggressive males are believed to use only their left hemisphere; whereas, aggressive females navigate based on their right eyes. Although a clear conclusion cannot be drawn from this study between the hemispheres and the aggression levels, it is fairly clear that males and females show variation in aggression syndrome. In short, various forces affecting each sex can result in different aggressive behaviors among male and female fish.

== Aggression for genetic makeup ==
Evolution of aggression can occur in fish due to their genetic makeup. To examine the relationship between aggression and genetic makeup, a team from CNRS/Laboratoire Neurobiologie et Développement conducted an experiment on zebra fish. At the beginning, the team of CNRS organized behavioral tests to quantitatively measure the three characters of aggressive behavior. In the experiment, it turned out that this particular fish has a mutation in its fgfr-1 gene summarizing for a membrane receptor sensitive to FGF (Fibroblast Growth Factor), which is a key for growth factor in those fish. As a reaction to the mutation, this group of fish displays low brain levels of histamine. Histamine is a neurotransmitter that controls appetite, sleep and attention in a species. Due to low histamine levels, zebra fish exhibit aggressive behavior. Therefore, the link between the fgfr-1 genes to histamine regulates the behavioral status of aggression in zebra fish.

In another experiment Katrina Tiira performed a different test on land-locked Atlantic salmon (Salmo salar) to see if juveniles with low estimated genetic diversity showed less aggression. To continue the theory, researchers selected one group of fish with low genetic diversity and another group with high genetic diversity, and compared aggression levels. They observed that salmon fry with low genetic variation showed less aggression than the other group. In the group of less variation, the researcher used closely related parents. The juveniles were genetically related sharing high number of alleles with each other. Thus, they display low aggression to their competitors as they used kin recognition method on others. In conclusion, it can be explained that genetic variation in salmon can manipulate the agnostic syndrome if the individuals in a group are closely related.

Aggression in fish can be increased by the effect of growth hormone, or GH, which has an essential growth factor in this species. They control the use of nutrients in tissue synthesis. Thus, it increases the metabolic demands in species resulting in aggression to fight for daily needs. An experiment was designed on juvenile rainbow trout (Oncorhynchus mykiss). They selected two control fish (C/C pairs), two growth hormone treated fish (GH/GH pairs) or one growth hormone-treated and one control (C/GH pairs). From the testing, it was analyzed that the GH increases aggression levels in all groups of O. mykiss. It indirectly improved the swimming activity along with the attacking rate between competitors. In summary, growth hormone plays a vital role in controlling aggression in rainbow trout and other fish.
