= Pseudotropheus ater =

Conservation status
- Near Threatened (IUCN 3.1)

Scientific classification
- Kingdom: Animalia
- Phylum: Chordata
- Class: Actinopterygii
- Order: Cichliformes
- Family: Cichlidae
- Genus: Pseudotropheus
- Species: P. ater

Binomial name
- Pseudotropheus ater Stauffer, 1988

Synonyms
- Chindongo ater (Stauffer, 1988)

Species of fish

Pseudotropheus ater is a species of cichlid endemic to Lake Malawi where it is only known from around Chinyamwezi Island and Chinyankwazi Island. It prefers areas with rocky substrates at depths of from 3 to 15 metres (9.8 to 49.2 ft) where it grazes from the rock surfaces. This species can reach a length of 8.1 centimetres (3.2 in) SL. It can also be found in the aquarium trade.
