= Lake Opeta =

Ugandan lake with an extensive wetland system

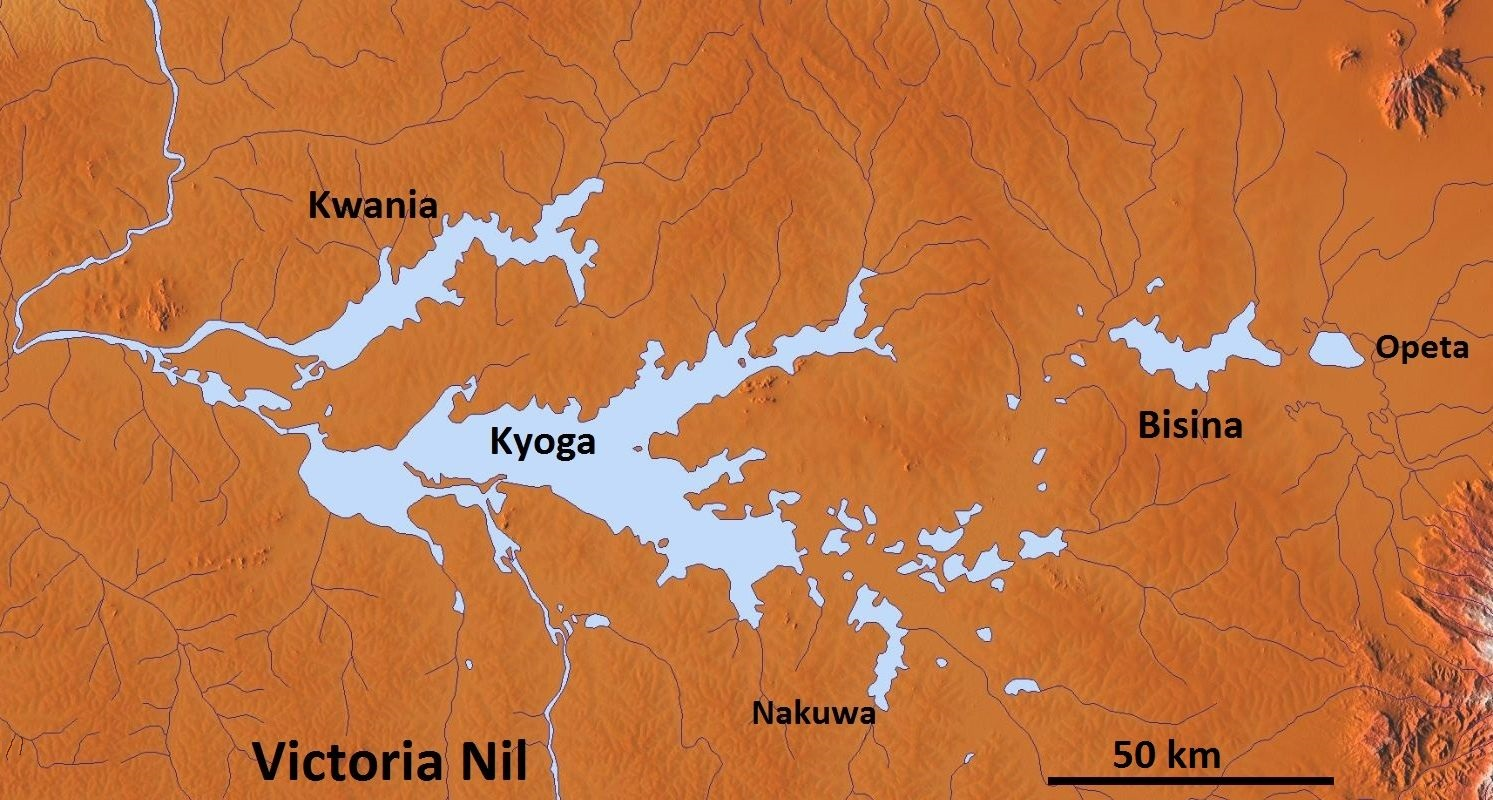
- Kyoga Lake Complex with the Opeta (right)

- Location within Uganda
- Location: Nakapiripirit, Sironko, Katakwi, Kumi
- Coordinates: 1°42′0″N 34°14′0″E
- Primary outflows: Lake Bisina
- Basin countries: Uganda
- Surface area: 68,912 hectares (170,290 acres)
- Surface elevation: 1,050 metres (3,440 ft)
- Islands: Tisai

Ramsar Wetland
- Official name: Lake Opeta Wetland System
- Designated: 15 September 2006
- Reference no.: 1636

Lake Opeta is a lake with an extensive wetland system in Uganda.

The wetland lies south of the Pian Upe Wildlife Reserve and serves as a dry-season refuge for both wildlife from the park and domestic cattle of the surrounding Karamajong and Pokot people.

== Hydrology ==
Lake Opeta is primarily fed by rainfall on Mount Elgon and drains into Lake Kyoga via Lake Bisina. It is surrounded by an extensive swamp and floodplain.

== Conservation ==
Lake Opeta is one of Uganda's 33 Important Bird Areas and since 2006 a Ramsar-listed wetland of international importance.

A Biodiversity and Eco-Tourism Centre funded by the Global Environmental Facility and UNDP serves the lake.

Lake Opeta and its surrounding swamps are located in eastern Uganda, 25 km north-east of Kumi town. The Ramsar site stands 1,050 m above sea level and covers an area of 68,913 hectares. The wetland system represents the easternmost part of the Lake Kyoga basin. It occupies an extensive floodplain between the Lake Bisina Ramsar Site (which it drains towards Lake Kyoga) to the west and the base of Mount Elgon, a massive extinct volcanic massif, to the south-east. The Lake Opeta wetlands marks the southern limits of the vast, arid region of Karamoja which extends along Uganda's eastern flank between Mount Elgon and the distant Sudan border, nearly 300 km to the north.

=== Birds ===
Fox's weaver, Uganda's only endemic bird species, is known to inhabit the wetland, as do the globally threatened vulnerable shoebill, near-threatened papyrus gonolek, and 160 other species.
