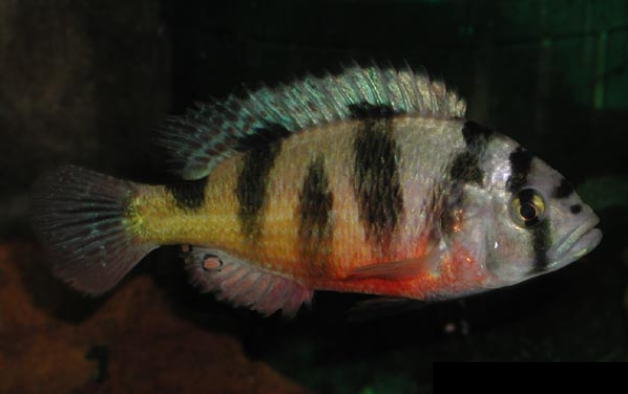

Conservation status
- Critically Endangered (IUCN 2.3)

Scientific classification
- Kingdom: Animalia
- Phylum: Chordata
- Class: Actinopterygii
- Order: Cichliformes
- Family: Cichlidae
- Genus: Astatotilapia
- Species: A. latifasciata

Binomial name
- Astatotilapia latifasciata (Regan, 1929)

Synonyms
- Haplochromis latifasciata (lapsus); Haplochromis latifasciatus Regan, 1929

= Haplochromis latifasciatus =

Species of fish

Astatotilapia latifasciata, formerly Haplochromis latifasciatus, is a species of cichlid that is endemic to Uganda where restricted to the Lake Kyoga system, including Lake Bisina (a medium-sized lake to the east of Lake Kyoga itself) and Lake Nawampasa (a small lake southeast of Lake Kyoga itself and only separated by a thin swamp).

This fish can reach a total length of 11 cm (4.3 in). It is also seen in the aquarium trade and it is easily bred in captivity. In the aquarium trade it is frequently labelled as Haplochromis "zebra obliquidens", which sometimes cause confusion with Haplochromis obliquidens, a separate species from Lake Victoria that is not known from the aquarium trade.

== See also ==
- List of freshwater aquarium fish species
