= Pseudotropheus fuscus =

Conservation status
- Least Concern (IUCN 3.1)

Scientific classification
- Kingdom: Animalia
- Phylum: Chordata
- Class: Actinopterygii
- Order: Cichliformes
- Family: Cichlidae
- Genus: Pseudotropheus
- Species: P. fuscus

Binomial name
- Pseudotropheus fuscus Trewavas, 1935

Synonyms
- Pseudotropheus fuscoides Fryer, 1956

Species of fish

Pseudotropheus fuscus is a species of cichlid endemic to Lake Malawi where it is known from Nkhata Bay and Lion's Cove. It prefers areas with rocky substrates, usually at depths of 5 metres (16 ft) or less. It feeds on algae. This species can reach a length of 11 centimetres (4.3 in) TL. It can also be found in the aquarium trade.
