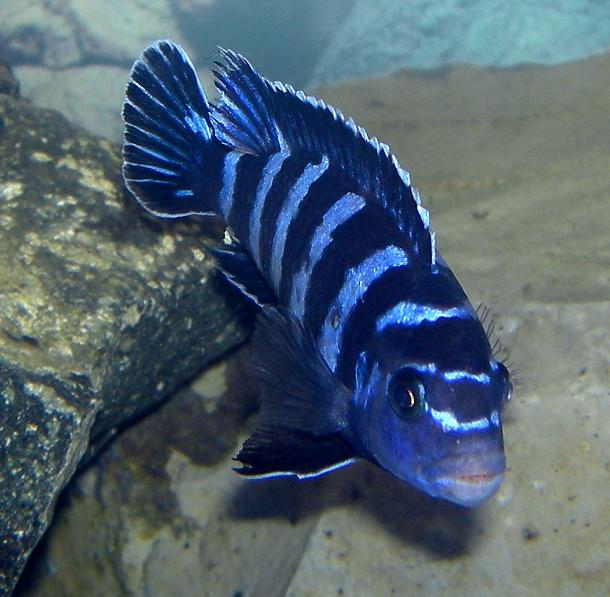

Conservation status
- Vulnerable (IUCN 3.1)

Scientific classification
- Kingdom: Animalia
- Phylum: Chordata
- Class: Actinopterygii
- Order: Cichliformes
- Family: Cichlidae
- Genus: Chindongo
- Species: C. demasoni

Binomial name
- Chindongo demasoni Konings, 1994

Synonyms
- Pseudotropheus demasoni

= Chindongo demasoni =

Species of fish

Chindongo demasoni is a species of cichlid endemic to Lake Malawi where it is only known from the Pombo Rocks in Tanzanian waters. This species can potentially reach a maximum length of 10 centimetres (3.9 in) SL. It is now commonly found in the aquarium trade.

== Etymology ==
Named in honor of Laif DeMason (Homestead, Florida, USA), importer, exporter, and breeder of cichlids.

== Coloration ==
The color of both sexes is dark blue with black vertical stripes with alternating lighter stripes of light blue to white. Male Demasoni cichlids have egg-spots on the anal fin, while females may lack egg-spots. Males also grows to a larger maximum size than females. Stress coloration is similar to normal coloration but much paler. This species belongs to the so-called Mbuna group of haplochromine cichlids, and like most Mbuna it is highly territorial, with parental care for the offspring (maternal mouthbrooding).
