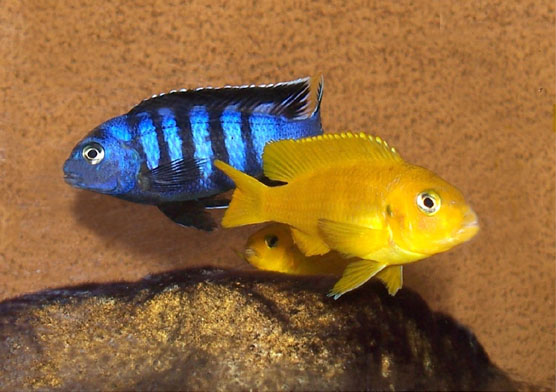
- male (blue and black) and female (yellow)

Conservation status
- Critically Endangered (IUCN 3.1)

Scientific classification
- Kingdom: Animalia
- Phylum: Chordata
- Class: Actinopterygii
- Division: Teleostei
- Order: Cichliformes
- Family: Cichlidae
- Genus: Pseudotropheus
- Species: P. saulosi

Binomial name
- Pseudotropheus saulosi Konings, 1990

Synonyms
- Chindongo saulosi (Konings, 1990)

= Pseudotropheus saulosi =

Species of fish

Pseudotropheus saulosi is a species of cichlid endemic to Lake Malawi in East Africa, where it lives in areas with rocky substrates. It is classified as a dwarf-mbuna and was first described by Ad Konings in 1990, who gave it the specific name saulosi in honour of Saulos Mwale who caught over 3,000 specimens in a single day on the expedition which collected the type. It comes from an area of the lake called Taiwan Reef, and from nowhere else. This fish can also be found in the aquarium trade.

This species can reach a length of 8.6 cm (3.4 in) TL. The fish are born yellow but as they reach maturity males turn blue with several vertical black bars. Less dominant males are paler blue and it is possible for some younger males to remain mixed in with the females, in typical yellow female dress. When the dominant male leaves a certain group, one of these incognito males may color up and become dominant.

Pseudotropheus saulosi is a maternal mouthbrooder. The female holds the eggs in her mouth until the fry are able to swim. This normally takes 13–18 days. The fish is Critically Endangered in the wild, and efforts are currently under way to re-stock Taiwan Reef with captive bred individuals.

== See also ==
- List of freshwater aquarium fish species
