= Pseudotropheus longior =

Conservation status
- Least Concern (IUCN 3.1)

Scientific classification
- Kingdom: Animalia
- Phylum: Chordata
- Class: Actinopterygii
- Order: Cichliformes
- Family: Cichlidae
- Genus: Pseudotropheus
- Species: P. longior

Binomial name
- Pseudotropheus longior Seegers, 1996

Synonyms
- Chindongo longior (Seegers, 1996)

Species of fish

Pseudotropheus longior is a species of cichlid endemic to Lake Malawi where it is only known from Mbamba Bay in Tanzania at depths of from 1 to 8 metres (3.3 to 26.2 ft). This species can reach a length of 8.7 centimetres (3.4 in) SL. It can also be found in the aquarium trade.
