= Cyan hap =

Conservation status
- Near Threatened (IUCN 3.1)

Scientific classification
- Kingdom: Animalia
- Phylum: Chordata
- Class: Actinopterygii
- Order: Cichliformes
- Family: Cichlidae
- Genus: Chindongo
- Species: C. cyaneus

Binomial name
- Chindongo cyaneus (Stauffer, 1988)

Synonyms
- Pseudotropheus cyaneus Stauffer, 1988

Species of fish

The cyan hap (Chindongo cyaneus) is a species of cichlid endemic to Lake Malawi where it is only known from Chinyamwezi Island. It prefers areas with plentiful rocks down to a depth of approximately 40 metres (130 ft) where it can graze from the rocks. This species can reach a length of 7.8 centimetres (3.1 in) SL. It can also be found in the aquarium trade.
