= Pseudotropheus flavus =

Conservation status
- Near Threatened (IUCN 3.1)

Scientific classification
- Kingdom: Animalia
- Phylum: Chordata
- Class: Actinopterygii
- Order: Cichliformes
- Family: Cichlidae
- Genus: Pseudotropheus
- Species: P. flavus

Binomial name
- Pseudotropheus flavus Stauffer, 1988

Synonyms
- Chindongo flavus (Stauffer, 1988)

Species of fish

Pseudotropheus flavus is a species of cichlid endemic to Lake Malawi where it is only known from Chinyankwazi Island. It prefers areas with rocky substrates where it remains about 1 metre (3.3 ft) above the bottom feeding on plankton. This species can reach a length of 7.6 centimetres (3.0 in) SL. It can also be found in the aquarium trade.
