= Haplochromis phytophagus =

Conservation status
- Data Deficient (IUCN 3.1)

Scientific classification
- Kingdom: Animalia
- Phylum: Chordata
- Class: Actinopterygii
- Order: Cichliformes
- Family: Cichlidae
- Genus: Haplochromis
- Species: H. phytophagus

Binomial name
- Haplochromis phytophagus Greenwood, 1966

Synonyms
- Xystichromis phytophagus (Greenwood, 1966)

Species of fish

Haplochromis phytophagus is a species of cichlid endemic to Lake Victoria. This species can reach a length of 8.6 centimetres (3.4 in) SL.
