= Lake Kyoga =

Large shallow lake in Uganda

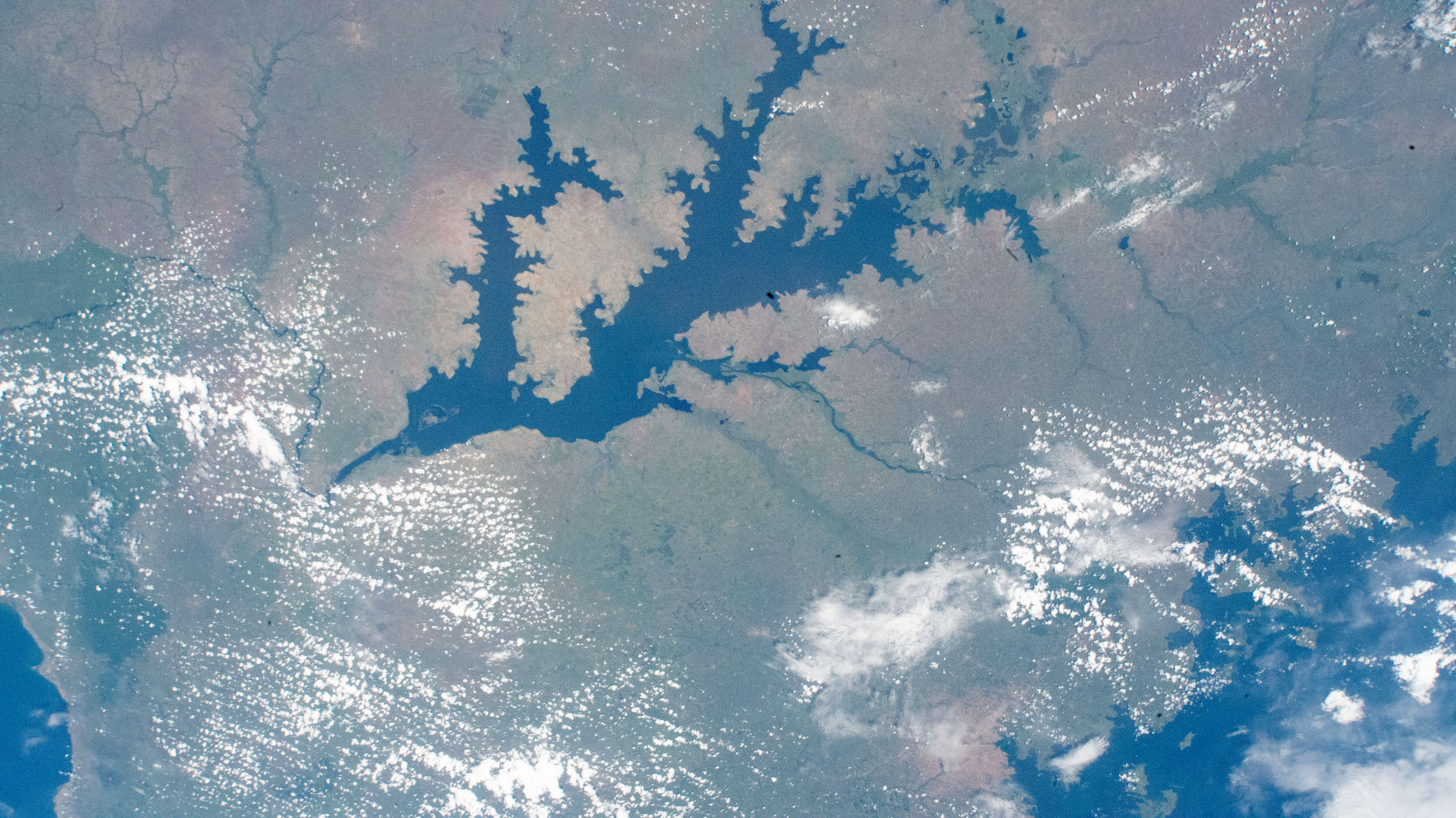
- Landscape surrounding Lake Kyoga

- Location within Uganda

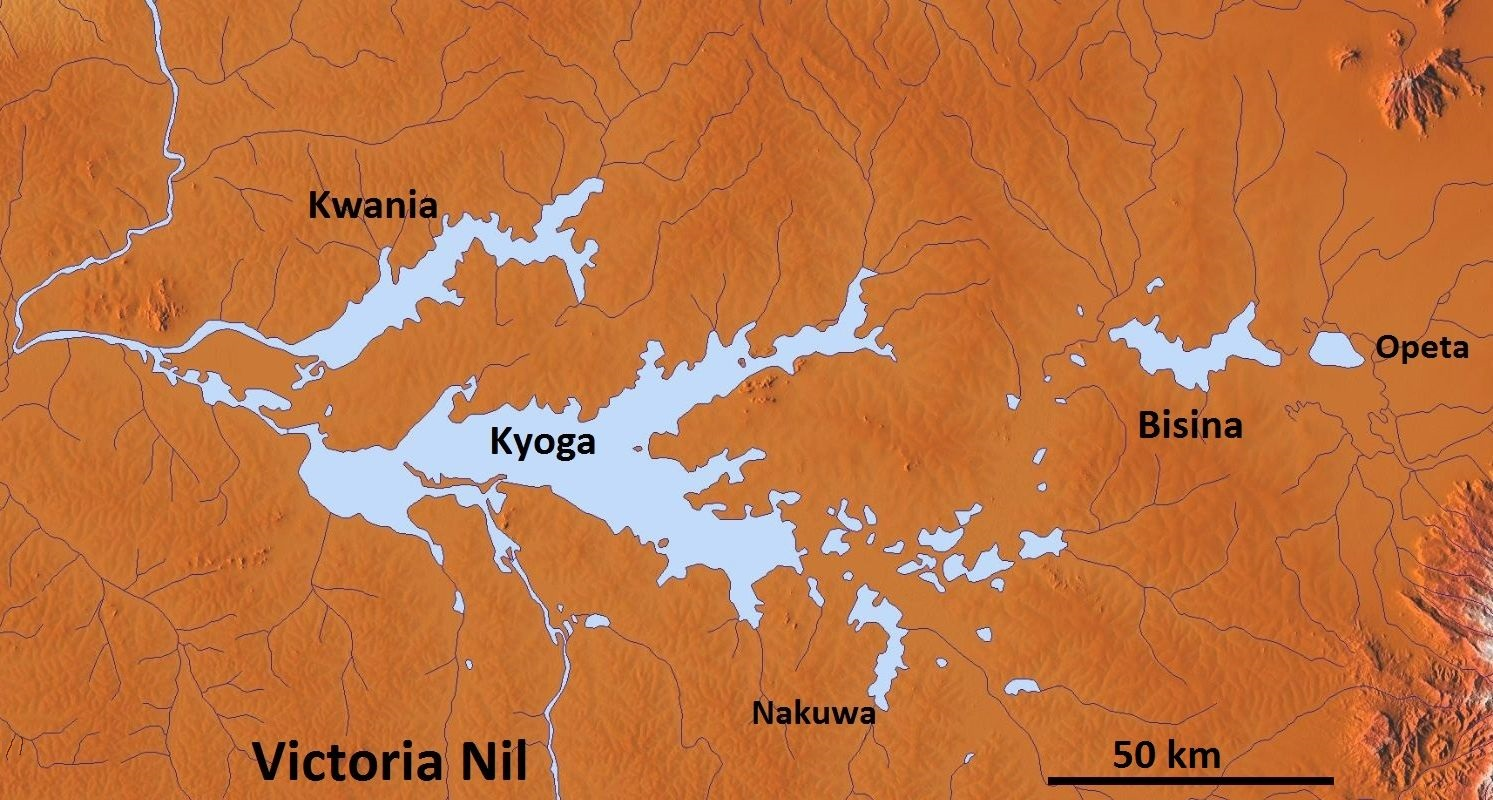
- Coordinates: 1°30′N 33°0′E
- Type: Polymictic; Basin Lakes
- Primary inflows: Victoria Nile
- Primary outflows: Victoria Nile
- Catchment area: 75,000 km^{2} (29,000 sq mi)
- Basin countries: Uganda
- Max. length: 200 km (120 mi)
- Surface area: 1,720 km^{2} (660 sq mi)
- Max. depth: 5.7 m (19 ft)
- Surface elevation: 1,033 m (3,389 ft)
- Settlements: Soroti

Lake Kyoga or Lake Kioga (literally 'the place of bathing' in Runyoro language) is a large shallow lake in Uganda, about 1,720 km^{2} (660 sq mi) in area and at an elevation of 1,033 metres. The Victoria Nile flows through the lake on its way from Lake Victoria to Lake Albert. The main inflow from Lake Victoria is regulated by the Nalubaale Power Station in Jinja. Another source of water is the Mount Elgon region on the border between Uganda and Kenya. While Lake Kyoga is part of the African Great Lakes system, it is not itself considered a great lake.

The lake reaches a depth of about 5.7 metres, and most of it is less than 4 metres deep. Areas that are less than 3 metres deep are completely covered by water lilies, while much of the swampy shoreline is covered with papyrus and the invasive water hyacinth. The papyrus also forms floating islands that drift between a number of small permanent islands. Extensive wetlands fed by a complex system of streams and rivers surround the lakes.

Its extensions include; Lake Kwania, Lake Bisina, Lake Bugondo and Lake Opeta.

== Fauna and fishing ==
Nile crocodiles are numerous, as is aquatic fauna. There are at least 60 haplochromine cichlid species, as well as a smaller number of other fish species like Lake Victoria sardine and marbled lungfish. Many of the haplochromine cichlids are endemic, but very closely related to the Lake Victoria species, and showing a similar level of diversity in terms of feeding. The Kyoga cichlids include both described species like Haplochromis latifasciatus and H. worthingtoni, and undescribed like H. sp. "Kyoga flameback" and H. sp. "ruby". As in Lake Victoria, the Kyoga cichlids have been decimated by the introduced Nile perch and some species are already extinct. Because Kyoga generally is shallow and swampy, some subsections—"satellite lakes"—are isolated to various degrees from the main lake. The number of surviving haplochromine cichlids in each subsection is directly related to the status of the Nile perch. Despite being the largest by far, less than 50 haplochromine species survive in the main section where the Nile perch is common. In comparison, the much smaller satellite lakes Lemwa, Nyaguo and Nawampasa lack Nile perch, but at least 50 haplochromine species survive in each of the first two, and at least 60 in the last. Conversely, the small satellite lakes Nakuwa and Nyasala where Nile perch is abundant have less than 30 and 5 surviving haplochromines respectively. This also means that fishing in the Lake Kyoga system has gradually shifted from once targeting many native species, to now primarily targeting the native Lake Victoria sardine, the introduced Nile perch and introduced Nile tilapia (the two native tilapias, the Singida and Victoria, have become very rare, except in some satellite lakes). In 2006, only 4% of catches were haplochromine cichlids.

== Flora ==
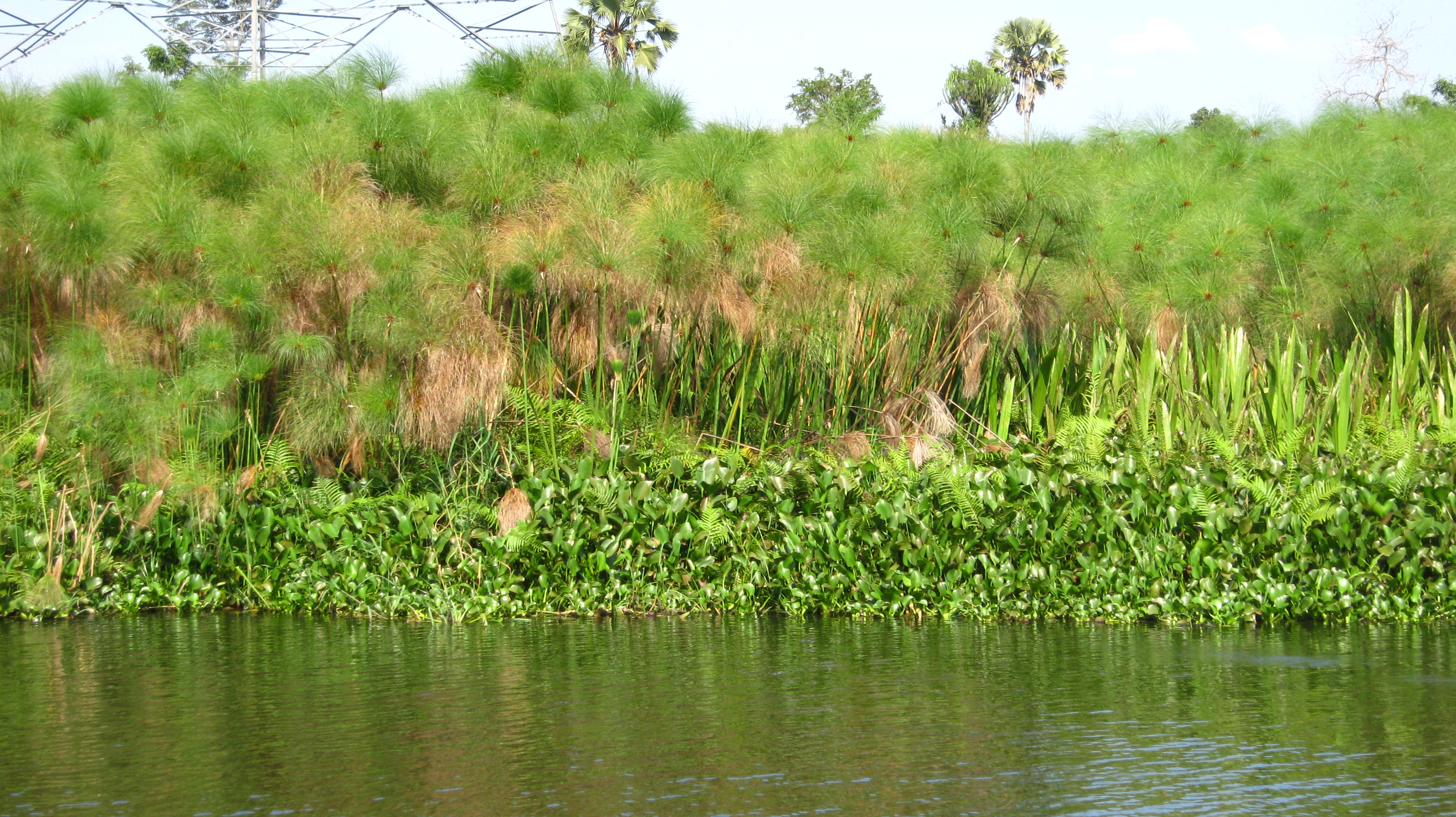
Lake Kyoga Papyrus

Lake Kyoga has flora that includes Pistia stratiotes (water lettuce), Cyperus papyrus, Vossia cuspidata (hippo grass) and water lily (Nymphaea spp.).
