= Geoffrey Fryer =

British biologist (1927–2024)

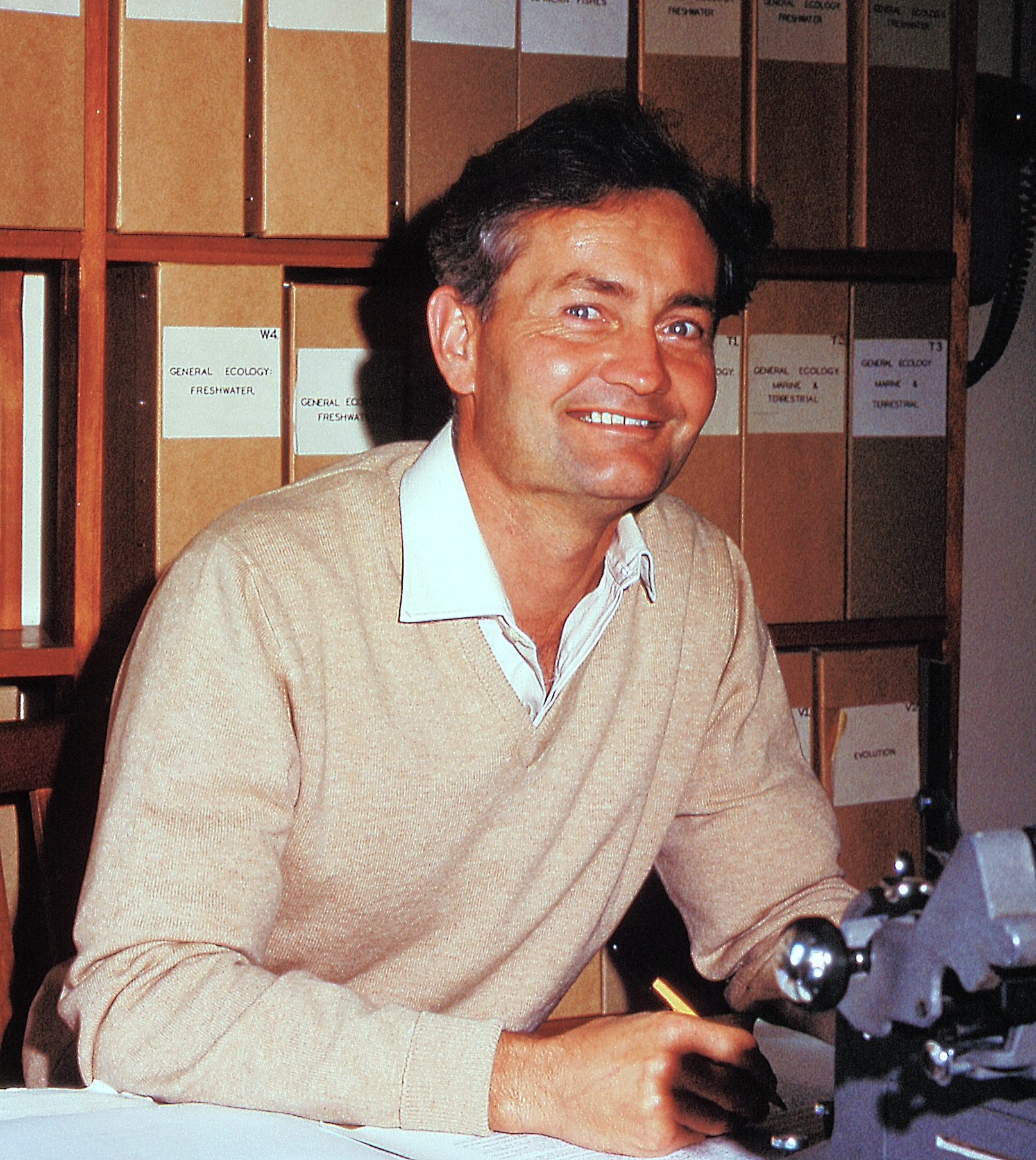
Geoffrey Fryer in 1971

Geoffrey Fryer FRS (6 August 1927 – 18 March 2024) was a British biologist.

== Life and career ==
Fryer was born in Huddersfield, Yorkshire on 6 August 1927. He attended Huddersfield College, and then the University of London.

Fryer was the Deputy Chief Scientific Officer at the Windermere Laboratory, and then at the Freshwater Biological Association from 1981 to 1988. He was also an Honorary Professor at the University of Lancaster from 1988.

In 1953, Fryer married Vivienne Hodgson. Together they had one son and one daughter. Fryer died on 18 March 2024, at the age of 96.

== Honours ==
Fryer was elected a Fellow of the Royal Society in 1972, awarded the Zoological Society of London Frink Medal in 1983, and the Linnean Medal in 1987.

== Tribute ==
Fish named after Fryer:

- The cichlid Alticorpus geoffreyi Snoeks & Walapa 2004
- The Lake Malawi cichlid Sciaenochromis fryeri Konings, 1993

== See also ==
- Category:Taxa named by Geoffrey Fryer
