= Mark Heap =

British actor and comedian (born 1957)

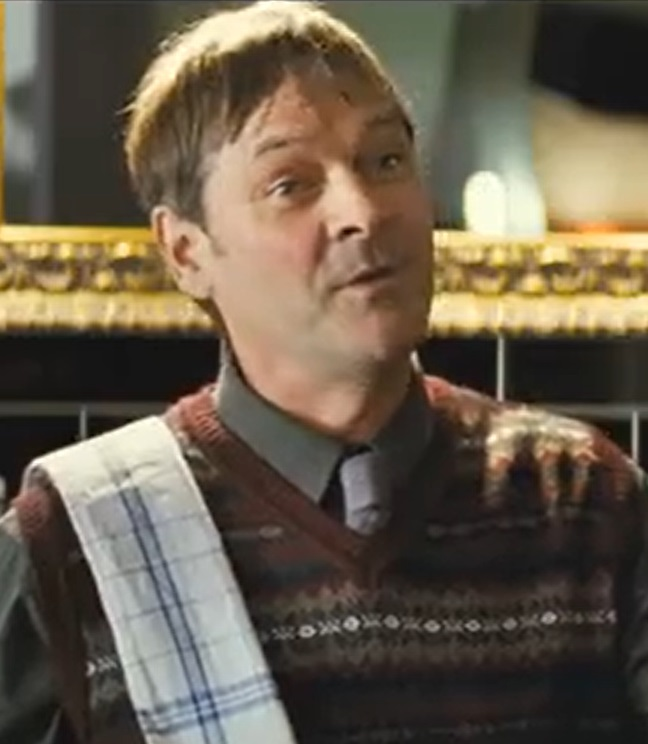
- Heap in The World's End in 2013
- Born: 13 May 1957 (age 69); Kodaikanal, Tamil Nadu, India
- Occupations: Actor; comedian
- Years active: 1983–present

Mark Heap (born 13 May 1957) is a British actor and comedian. Television credits include Ghost Train (1991), Smith & Jones (1997–1998), Brass Eye (1997–2001), Kiss Me Kate (1998), The Zig and Zag Show (1998), How Do You Want Me? (1998–1999), Stressed Eric (1998–2000), Green Wing (2004–2007), Spaced (1999–2001), The Strangerers (2000), Jam (2000), Doc Martin (2000), Happiness (2001–2003), Lark Rise to Candleford (2008–2011), Desperate Romantics (2009), Friday Night Dinner (2011–2020), Upstart Crow (2016–2018), and Benidorm (2017–2018).

Film credits include About a Boy (2002), Stardust (2007), The World's End (2013), Time Travel Is Dangerous (2024).

== Early life and education ==
Mark Heap was born on 13 May 1957 in Kodaikanal, Tamil Nadu, India, to an English father and American mother, the youngest of four boys. When the family moved to the United Kingdom, they lived in Wales. He stayed there until he moved to northern England.

He began acting in the 1970s as a member of the Medieval Players, a touring company performing medieval and early modern theatre, and featuring stilt-walking, juggling and puppetry. His brother Carl Heap, who is also an actor, was the artistic director of the company. After its demise, he became part of the street theatre duo The Two Marks (with Mark Saban).

== Career ==
=== Television ===
Heap starred in the BBC sketch show Big Train, where he performed a barefoot gymnastics routine and other sketches between 1998 and 2002, alongside other burgeoning comedy stars Simon Pegg, Julia Davis, Kevin Eldon, Catherine Tate, Amelia Bullmore, Rebecca Front, Nick Frost and Tracy-Ann Oberman. He appeared as struggling artist Brian Topp in Spaced (1999–2001), and the pompous Dr. Alan Statham in Green Wing (2004–07).

Heap worked with Chris Morris, in Blue Jam, radio predecessor to Jam, and the documentary parody series Brass Eye. He voiced the lead character of Eric Feeble in the animated comedy Stressed Eric. Other recurring roles included: Terry Roche in Paul Whitehouse's comedy-drama Happiness and Derek Few in How Do You Want Me? He played Harry in the short-lived Rob Grant TV series The Strangerers, in 2000. He also guested in the second series of the BBC comedy Look Around You as Leonard Hatred.

He appeared as an unsuccessful businessman who became a bellboy, in the 2007 BBC One drama Hotel Babylon. Between 2008 and 2010, he appeared as head postman Thomas Brown, in 32 episodes of the BBC period drama Lark Rise to Candleford. He was the super villain Lightkiller, in an episode of the sitcom No Heroics. He also appeared as the father of Chris Miles in the Channel 4 programme Skins. Heap played the love interest of the main character in the second series of the BBC comedy Love Soup. He played the role of Charles Dickens in the 2009 BBC Two drama Desperate Romantics. He also played Jessica Hynes' husband in the one-off comedy written by Hynes and Julia Davis: Lizzie & Sarah.

In 2010, Heap appeared as Bob Stevens, the leader of a rambling group in the BBC Four series The Great Outdoors. He also appeared as a psychiatrist in Miranda Hart's BBC2 comedy Miranda. In October 2010, he appeared as Robin in the four-part BBC drama Single Father.

From 2011 to 2020, Heap played eccentric neighbour Jim Bell in the Channel 4 sitcom Friday Night Dinner, alongside Simon Bird, Paul Ritter, Tom Rosenthal and Tamsin Greig. He also played Andrew Thorogood in the BBC Four comedy Holy Flying Circus, and Jonas in the eighth episode of E4's sci-fi comedy-drama Misfits in Series 3. He appeared as a misguided church minister during an outbreak of smallpox in the BBC series The Indian Doctor. In 2012, he joined the cast of the Sky1 original series Spy, for its second series commencing in October 2012, replacing Tom Goodman-Hill as Philip Quil, Judith's partner and Marcus' headteacher.

He appeared in the spin-off episode of Outnumbered, the Christmas special episode, aired on 24 December 2012 in which he portrayed Norris, for this single episode. He played the owner of a pet crematorium in Sue Perkins's 2013 comedy Heading Out. He had a leading role in BBC Radio 4's adaptation of Gogol's Dead Souls. He appeared as Robert Greene in three series of Upstart Crow (2016–18), a BBC Two sitcom about Shakespeare, written by Ben Elton. He also appeared as Dr. John Hall in the stage show based on the programme.

From 2017 to 2018, Heap appeared in the sitcom Benidorm, playing the character Malcolm Barrett, the controlling and manipulative boyfriend of Pauline Maltby. In 2019, he appeared in Acorn TV's Queens of Mystery alongside Olivia Vinall.

In 2020, Heap appeared in Intelligence, and played headmaster and husband in ITV's The Trouble with Maggie Cole.

=== Film ===
In 1983, Heap made a brief appearance as a torch-juggler in the James Bond film Octopussy. He played Duncan, Rik Mayall's hapless personal assistant, in Bring Me the Head of Mavis Davis (1997). He played a school teacher in the 2002 film About a Boy. He made a cameo appearance with Kevin Eldon in Tim Burton's 2005 Charlie and the Chocolate Factory. He played supporting roles in Confetti (2006), Tunnel of Love (2004), Stardust (2007). In 2008, he co-starred in the surreal sci-fi B-movie spoof Captain Eager and the Mark of Voth, and was a publican in The World's End.

=== Other acting ===
In 1993, Heap played villain Hans Schultze in the "Double Identity" episode of Crimewatch File. Schultze was the German alter ego of Englishman John Calton who led a gang of kidnappers robbing banks and a supermarket, and holding families hostage.

In 2008, Heap played the role of Widmerpool in a Radio 4 serialisation of Anthony Powell's A Dance to the Music of Time. He played Eliza's husband in 2006 Radio 4 play The Eliza Stories and appeared as Marmite the Dwarf in the short-lived Radio 4 sitcom The Sofa of Time. He starred in the music video for Four Tet's single "Smile Around the Face" in 2005, contributed a multitude of character voices in the audiobook "Do Ants Have Arseholes?". In 2012, he starred as Martin in the Radio 4 play Cordite for Breakfast, a comedy about Napoleonic-era battle re-enactments. In March 2013, he appeared as Rincewind in a 4-part Radio 4 adaptation of Terry Pratchett's Eric. He also played the angel Aziraphale in the 2014 BBC radio adaption of Neil Gaiman and Terry Pratchett's Good Omens. He also was the lead in a series of radio advertisements for telecommunications company TalkTalk.

== Filmography ==
Key
†	Denotes works that have not yet been released

=== Film ===
Year	Title	Role	Notes
1983	Octopussy	Fire Juggler	Uncredited role
1997	Bring Me the Head of Mavis Davis	Duncan	
1999	The Comedy Trail: A Shaggy Dog Story	Horse Jockey	TV special
2002	About a Boy	Maths Teacher	
2002	Ant Muzak	Tannoy Voice	Short films
2004	Out of Time	Charlie	Short films
2004	The Calcium Kid	Sebastian Gore-Brown	
2005	Charlie and the Chocolate Factory	Man with Dog	
2005	Blake's Junction 7	Avon	Short film
2005	Animal	Hugo Getner	
2006	Confetti	Registrar	
2006	Scoop	M.C.	
2006	Alpha Male	Darwen	
2007	Stardust	Prince Tertius	
2008	Captain Eager and the Mark of Voth	Scrutty Baker	
2008	The Pro		Short films
2011	Muso Soup	Shash (voice)	Short films
2012	20,000 Leagues Under the Sea		Short films
2012	Is This a Joke?	Doctor	Short films
2013	All Stars	Simon Tarrington	
2013	The World's End	Publican 7	
2015	The Last Post	The Reverend Brian Pile	Short film
2016	The Comedian's Guide to Survival	Pick Up Driver	
2018	Killer Weekend	Gerald	
2022	The House	Mr. Thomas (voice)	Segment 'I'
2022	The School for Good and Evil	Professor Bilious Manley	
2022	Your Christmas or Mine?	Johnson	
2024	Time Travel Is Dangerous	The Regency Dandy	
2026	The Magic Faraway Tree	Mr. Oom Boom Boom	

=== Television ===
Year	Title	Role	Notes
1983	Martin Luther, Heretic	Medieval Player	Television film
1987	Get Fresh	The Two Marks	Series 2; Episode 7
1987	The Les Dennis Laughter Show	The Two Marks	Series 1; Episode 2
1988	The Les Dennis Laughter Show	Various characters	Series 2; 7 episodes
1990	Up Yer News	Film Assistant	Episode dated 28 June 1990
1991	Ghost Train	Mafia's Man / The Two Marks	Series 3; 3 episodes
1992	Packing Them In	Fire-eating Stilt-walker	2nd series of Packet of Three; Episode 1
1993	Viva Cabaret	The Two Marks	Series 1; Episode 6
1993	Crimewatch File	Hans Schultze	Series 6; Episode 2: "Double Identity"
1994	The Bill	Chris Boxer	Series 10; Episode 119: "Blackout"
1994	Seaforth	Capt. Karl Von Berner	Also known as How High the Moon. Mini-series; Episodes 1–3
1994	What's Up Doc?	Mark the Security Guard	Series 2; Episode 25
1995	What's Up Doc?	Alfred the Butler	Series 3; Episode 25
1995	The World of Lee Evans	Platform Guard	Episode 2: "Off the Rails"
1997	Hospital!	Dr. Ralph Crosby	Television film
1997	An Unsuitable Job for a Woman	DS Maskell	Series 1; Episode 1: "Sacrifice". Uncredited role
1997–1998	Smith & Jones	Various characters	Series 9; Episode 3: "Massage.", and Series 10; Episode 5: "New T.V."
1997–2001	Brass Eye	Various characters	Series 1 & 2; 7 episodes
1998	Kiss Me Kate	Peter	Series 1; Episodes 2–6
1998	The Zig and Zag Show	Various characters	Episodes 8, 12 & 13
1998–1999	How Do You Want Me?	Derek Few	Series 1 & 2; 8 episodes
1998–2000	Stressed Eric	Eric Feeble (voice)	Series 1 & 2; 13 episodes
1998–2002	Big Train	Various characters	Series 1 & 2; 12 episodes
1999	All Along the Watchtower	Mr. Carter	Episode 3: "Keeping the Peace"
1999	People Like Us	Graham Atkinson	Series 1; Episode 6: "The Head Teacher"
1999–2001	Spaced	Brian Topp	Series 1 & 2; 14 episodes
2000	The Strangerers	Harry	Episodes 1–9
2000	Jam	Various characters	Mini-series; Episodes 1–6
2001	Doc Martin	Mitch	Television film (First prequel to Saving Grace)
2001–2003	Happiness	Terry Roche	Series 1 & 2; 12 episodes
2003	Doc Martin and the Legend of the Cloutie	Mitch	Television film (Second prequel to Saving Grace)
2003	Spine Chillers	Balfus	Episode 5: "Goths"
2004	Dalziel and Pascoe	Julian Finch	Series 8; Episode 2: "The Price of Fame"
2004	Swiss Toni	Terry Fragment	Series 2; Episode 8: "Fothergill 2000"
2004	Tunnel of Love	Gibson	Television film
2004–2007	Green Wing	Dr. Alan Statham	Series 1 & 2; 18 episodes & 2 short specials
2005	Look Around You	Leonard Hatred	Series 2; Episodes 1 & 6: "Music" and "Live Final"
2005	Casanova	Doctor Gozzi	Mini-series; Episode 1
2007	Hotel Babylon	Robert Kane	Series 2; Episode 4
2007	Agatha Christie's Marple	Mr. Humfries	Series 3; Episode 1: At Bertram's Hotel
2007–2008	Singles Files	Jeff	Mini-series; Episodes 1–5
2008	Skins	Graham Miles	Series 2; Episode 10: "Everyone"
2008	Love Soup	Douglas McVitie	Series 2; Episodes 7–11
2008	No Heroics	Lightkiller	Episode 4: "Back Issues"
2008–2011	Lark Rise to Candleford	Thomas Brown	Series 1–4; 37 episodes
2009	Desperate Romantics	Charles Dickens	Mini-series; Episodes 1–5
2009	Cast Offs	Darren	Episode 6: "Carrie"
2010	Lizzie and Sarah	Michael	Television film
2010	The Great Outdoors	Bob	Episodes 1–3
2010	Single Father	Robin	Mini-series; Episodes 1–4
2010, 2015	Miranda	Anthony	Series 2; Episode 5: "Just Act Normal" and final episode: "The Final Curtain"
2011	Holy Flying Circus	Andrew Thorogood	Television film
2011	Misfits	Jonas	Series 3; Episode 8
2011–2020	Friday Night Dinner	Jim Bell	Series 1–6; 37 episodes
2012	The Indian Doctor	Rev. Herbert Todd	Series 2; Episodes 1–5
2012	A Moody Christmas	Heathrow Passenger	Mini-series; Episode 1: "Separate Seats"
2012	Outnumbered	Norris	Series 4; Episode 8: "Christmas Special 2012"
2012	Spy	Philip	Series 2; Episodes 1–11
2012–2016	The Increasingly Poor Decisions of Todd Margaret	Lord Mountford	Series 2 & 3; 4 episodes
2013	Heading Out	Brian	Episode 1
2013	Midsomer Murders	Simon Fergus-Johnson	Series 16; Episode 1: "The Christmas Haunting"
2014	Death in Paradise	Alec Burton	Series 3; Episode 6: "The Early Bird"
2014	Comedy Playhouse	Brother Francis	Series 16; Episode 3: "Monks"
2015	The Art of Foley	Jeremy	Mini-series; Episodes 1 & 2: "Earrings" and "Crow"
2015	Undercover	DCI Langdon	Episode 4
2015	We're Doomed! The Dad's Army Story	Clive Dunn	Television film
2016	Endeavour	Felix Lorimer	Series 3; Episode 4: "Coda"
2016	Digby Dragon	Mungo	Series 1 & 2; 27 episodes
2016–2017	Maigret	Dr. Moers	Series 1 & 2; 4 episodes
2016–2018	Upstart Crow	Robert Greene	Series 1–3; 19 episodes
2017	Murder on the Blackpool Express	Graham	Television film
2017–2018	Benidorm	Denis Walker (Malcolm Barrett)	Series 9; Episodes 7 & 8, and Series 10, Episode 7
2018	The Team	Albert	Series 2; Episodes 1–8
2018	Zapped	Florian	Series 3; Episode 6: "Amulet"
2018	The Midnight Gang	Sir Quentin Strillers	Television film
2019	Queens of Mystery	Kurt Lee	Series 1; Episodes 3 & 4: "Death by Vinyl: First & Final Chapters"
2019	Urban Myths	Ken Burrows	Series 3; Episode 3: "The Trial of Joan Collins"
2020	Intelligence	Barnaby Bailer	Series 1; Episode 4
2020	The Trouble with Maggie Cole	Peter Cole	Episodes 1–6
2022	Live at the Moth Club	George	Episodes 1–5
2022	Sky Comedy Shorts	Colin	Mini-series; Episode 4: "Silo"
2023	Ant & Dec's Saturday Night Takeaway	Butler	Series 19; 4 episodes
2023	Significant Other	Ray	Episode 3
2024	Renegade Nell	Newspaper Editor	Episodes 6 & 7: "Snatched by Strollers" and "Stop Printing This Muck"
2024	The Completely Made-Up Adventures of Dick Turpin	John Turpin	Series 1; Episodes 1–6
2024	Sister Boniface Mysteries	Kirk Fabricant	Series 3; Episode 4: "Professor Y"
2024	Beyond Paradise	Bob Holland	Series 3; Episode: "Christmas Special"
2024–present	Piglets	Superintendent Bob Weekes	Lead role; Series 1–2 12 episodes
2026–present	Can You Keep a Secret?	William Fendon	Lead role

=== Video Games ===
Year	Title	Role	Notes
2004	Wings of War	General Allied / Enemy General #2 (voice)	
2010	Fable III	Brian (voice)	
