= The Secret Life of the Zoo =

- Genre: Documentary
- Narrated by: Olivia Colman; Tamsin Greig
- Country of origin: United Kingdom
- Original language: English
- No. of series: 10 (1 compilation series)
- No. of episodes: 69 (including specials)

Production
- Production company: Blast! Films

Original release
- Network: Channel 4
- Release: 2 February 2016 – 14 September 2021

The Secret Life of the Zoo is a British documentary programme produced by Blast! Films on behalf of Channel 4. The series is filmed on location at Chester Zoo in the North West of England, and focuses on the behaviour of the animals at the zoo and their relationships with the keepers. The first five series were narrated by Olivia Colman. Actress Tamsin Greig took over narration from the sixth series.

== Production ==
The series gives viewers behind the scenes access to Chester Zoo's 21,000 animals and the people who work there. The zoo's keepers are interviewed in each episode about the various animals and incidents. Head of programmes at Blast!, Nick Hornby explained that as they wanted to tell the story from the animals' perspectives, they did not want the bars of the cages to be in shot, so they placed fixed cameras in the various enclosures. The first series was filmed over 10 months. The series was originally narrated by Olivia Colman. Tamsin Greig took over from October 2018. Ten series have aired between 2016 and 2021. The 8th series started airing in the UK on Channel 4 from 31 October 2019. The ninth series began on 13 February 2020. The tenth and final series began on 10 August 2021.

== Episodes ==
=== Season 1 (2016) ===
| No. overall | No. in series | Title | Original release date | UK viewers (millions) |
|---|---|---|---|---|
| 1 | 1 | "New Arrival" | 2 February 2016 | 2.75 |
Asian elephant Thi-Hi-Way gives birth to female calf, Nandita. Asian small clawed otters Daisy and Robbie are retiring from the breeding program. Red pandas Jung and Nima have cubs and the chimpanzees are fighting for dominance.
| 2 | 2 | "Mate for Life" | 9 February 2016 | 2.47 |
The keepers face the challenge of moving a family of five rare Sumatran tigers to a brand new enclosure. The Montserrat tarantulas are set up on a date. Sun bears Milli and Toni join the collection from the Rare Species Conservation Centre in Kent.
| 3 | 3 | "Baby Giraffe" | 16 February 2016 | 2.51 |
Rothschild's giraffe Orla gives birth to a male calf named Kidepo. The keepers attempt to breed from the critically endangered mountain chicken frogs.
| 4 | 4 | "Save the Elephants" | 23 February 2016 | 2.88 |
Florence the Grévy's zebra arrives from the West Midland Safari Park to meet resident stallion, Mac. The elephant house is hit by a potentially deadly virus with two of the babies Hari and Bala falling gravely ill.
| 5 | 5 | "Fledgling Penguins" | 1 March 2016 | 2.67 |
The Humboldt penguin chicks are introduced to the main pool. Two new Sunda gharial crocodiles arrive from France, but refuse to eat. Boris the chimpanzee takes a wild moorhen chick hostage and keepers try to work out why two Bornean river turtles are not breeding.
| 6 | 6 | "Black Rhinos" | 8 March 2016 | 2.61 |
Female black rhinoceros Kitani is introduced to potential mate, Magadi. A baby Sumatran orangutan is born.

=== Season 2 (2016) ===
| No. overall | No. in series | Title | Original release date | UK viewers (millions) |
|---|---|---|---|---|
| 7 | 1 | "Difficult Parenting" | 17 November 2016 | 1.76 |
Grévy's zebras Florence and Nadine are about to give birth. Keepers and vets try to encourage the Asiatic lions Iblis and Kumari to breed and the warthog piglets are causing trouble.
| 8 | 2 | "Antisocial Otters" | 24 November 2016 | 1.72 |
Willie, a male Bornean orangutan from the Netherlands is introduced to Chester's resident females in the hopes of producing a baby. Kendari the babirusa gives birth and the Asian small-clawed otters have a big surprise for their keepers.
| 9 | 3 | "Penguin Parent Drama" | 1 December 2016 | 1.54 |
Illness strikes the Humboldt penguin chicks. The radiated tortoises are joined by two new females from Sweden. Sulawesi macaque Lisa gives birth and dad Mamassa is being useless so older brother Beaker steps in to help with the babysitting. Andean bear Bernie is determined to woo Lima when she enters her short window of fertility.
| 10 | 4 | "Tiger Family Matters" | 8 December 2016 | 1.79 |
Oana the anoa gives birth to a calf. Sumatran tigers Topan and Jaya leave Chester Zoo for zoos in France and Wales. The capybaras are also experiencing a baby boom.
| 11 | 5 | "The Great Escape" | 15 December 2016 | 2.00 |
An emergency is declared when the zoo keepers discover four Sumatran orangutans have escaped from their new enclosure. The meerkats are fighting for dominance and keepers are hoping for a baby elephant.
| 12 | 6 | "Secret Life of the Zoo at Christmas" | 22 December 2016 | 2.08 |
A rare Malayan tapir calf is born. The Sumatran orangutans are given Christmas presents and vets give Bali the reticulated python a health check. Sun bears Millie and Tony have a stale relationship and may have to be separated.

=== Season 3 (2017) ===
| No. overall | No. in series | Title | Original release date | UK viewers (millions) |
|---|---|---|---|---|
| 13 | 1 | "Rhino Romance" | 28 February 2017 | 2.05 |
Komala the Indian rhinoceros is moving to a zoo in Turkey. Pedro the giant anteater is seriously ill and the Asian mantis are introduced for breeding.
| 14 | 2 | "Growing Pains" | 7 March 2017 | 1.87 |
Tula the Rothschild's giraffe gives birth to a male calf named Murchison. The Humboldt penguin chicks are introduced to the adult pool and Eko, a six-month-old silvery gibbon is learning to climb, but he has one problem: he is afraid of heights (acrophobic).
| 15 | 3 | "Territorial Chimps" | 14 March 2017 | 2.09 |
Kinky Tail the cheetah falls ill and is taken to the vets. The chimpanzees are joined by a new female from Germany. Asian small-clawed otter runt Bo is being watched by the keepers. Doctor the copperband butterflyfish is helping control glass anemone population in the aquarium.
| 16 | 4 | "Baby Elephant" | 21 March 2017 | 2.09 |
Asian elephant Sundara gives birth to a female calf. Keepers name her Indali, but her half sister, Nandita is not impressed. The bush dogs have pups and keepers want the rhino beetles to reproduce. Apple the onager faces a major operation.
| 17 | 5 | "Adventures of Porcupine Dating" | 28 March 2017 | 2.05 |
Jenny the Brazilian tapir is seriously ill. A new male crested porcupine arrives as a potential mate for female, Roxy. Keepers try to breed from black rhinos Kifaru and Malindi, but Kifaru's health could be a problem.
| 18 | 6 | "Sibling Rivalry" | 4 April 2017 | 2.01 |
Two female African wild dogs arrive from Port Lympne Wild Animal Park in Kent to join Chester's two males. Raja the Bornean river turtle meets two prospective mates. Stomp and K'tusha the okapis are introduced for the first time and keepers try to entice romance between the cassowary.
| 19 | 7 | "Courtship of the Jaguars" | 11 April 2017 | 2.11 |
Jaguars Napo and Goshi are being encouraged to mate. Asian elephant Sithami gives birth to male calf, Aayu. Murchison the Rothschild's giraffe calf will not go outside and a female Parson's chameleon named Daphne arrives from Paris.

=== Season 4 (2017–2018) ===
| No. overall | No. in series | Title | Original release date | UK viewers (millions) |
|---|---|---|---|---|
| 20 | 1 | "Baby Rhino Due Date" | 15 November 2017 | 2.17 |
Hazina, a rare black rhinoceros calf is born to mum, Kitani. The zoo receive four lowland streaked tenrecs for a new breeding programme, and attempts are made to breed the unusual jewel wasps.
| 21 | 2 | "Tiger Mother-Daughter Drama" | 22 November 2017 | 2.07 |
Jung the red panda is losing weight and his keepers are unsure why. JC the mandrill goes to the vets for a health check and Kasarna the Sumatran tiger is having to find her own dinner.
| 22 | 3 | "Adventurous Bear Cub" | 29 November 2017 | 1.87 |
Zoo keepers are delighted when spectacled bear, Lima gives birth to the zoo's first ever cub. However, it is not long before little Madidi is getting into trouble. The pygmy marmosets have also had twins. The rock hyraxes have three new pups.
| 23 | 4 | "Chimp Negotiations" | 6 December 2017 | 1.72 |
Male onager, Holmes has been introduced to the females for breeding. The chimpanzees have a new toy but keeper, Niall needs it back. Zuzu the Galápagos tortoise is dominating her sister Charlie, who is losing weight because of this. Village weaver Plo, is trying to improve his nest building skills.
| 24 | 5 | "Lady Boss Lemur" | 13 December 2017 | 1.89 |
Two belted ruffed lemurs join the bachelor ring-tailed lemurs on their Island. Keepers pair up two Javan green magpies in the hope of saving the species. The Komodo dragons are being harness trained in order to move. Grévy's zebras, Florence and newcomer Okoth are not getting along.
| 25 | 6 | "O Come All Ye Mongoose (Christmas)" | 20 December 2017 | 1.94 |
Keepers prepare Christmas presents for the animals. A litter of dwarf mongoose pups are born. The chimpanzees are having a chaotic free-for-all with festive parcels. Indian rhino Asha is ignoring Beni and the leaf cutter ants work together to build a new home.
| 26 | 7 | "Sloth Couples Therapy" | 2 January 2018 | 1.88 |
The keepers try to encourage the two-toed sloths Tina and Rico to breed with a new outdoor enclosure. Tripod the three legged chameleon is paired up with a potential mate. Runa the giant otter is not eating and keepers are unsure why. Spider monkey Mary is given a contraceptive implant.
| 27 | 8 | "Baby Porcupine on the Loose!" | 9 January 2018 | 1.92 |
The keepers have to move three Malayan tapirs to a new enclosure. Roxy and Hendrix the crested porcupines have a baby. Some new male golden dart frogs arrive and chimpanzees Vila and Alice are competing for title of dominant female.
| 28 | 9 | "Heating Up a Sun Bear Romance" | 16 January 2018 | 1.87 |
Zuri the black rhinoceros gives birth to a male calf. The keepers name him Ike. One of the Asian small-clawed otter pups goes missing. Sun bears Milli and Toni are moving to a new enclosure and Shan-Shan the Bactrian camel is seriously ill.
| 29 | 10 | "Mouse Deer Move-out" | 23 January 2018 | 2.13 |
The keepers try to breed big-belly seahorses. The keepers are catching Rodrigues fruit bats to control their population explosion. Himba the aardvark moves to a zoo in Germany, and a male Balabac mouse deer arrives from Poland as a potential mate for the zoo's youngest female.

=== Season 5 (2018) ===
| No. overall | No. in series | Title | Original release date | UK viewers (millions) |
|---|---|---|---|---|
| 30 | 1 | "Aardvark-Free Romance" | 18 April 2018 | 1.67 |
A new pair of meerkats arrive. Subis the Sumatran orangutan gives birth but there are complications. Keepers try to breed from some rare three horned chameleons, while vampire crabs Janet and John have not shown interest in starting a family.
| 31 | 2 | "Painted Dog Puppy Drama" | 25 April 2018 | 1.54 |
Stuma the okapi falls ill. K'mana the African wild dog produces a litter of seven puppies. Atlas moths Dave and Simon only have five days of life after hatching, and their sole purpose is to mate.
| 32 | 3 | "Make Way for Baby Giraffe" | 2 May 2018 | 1.54 |
Orla the Rothschild's giraffe gives birth to calf Narus. A baby Bornean orangutan is born to Sareki. Keepers try to breed from a young male sengi and some northern bald ibis are let outside for the first time.
| 33 | 4 | "Runt of the Litter" | 9 May 2018 | 1.43 |
Health checks are performed on the African wild dog pups. Emma the Sumatran orangutan gives birth to a new baby, but concerns are raised about the health of her older baby, Tripa. The Humbolt penguins move into a temporary home while a new luxury home is built for them and Hercules beetle, Wonky Horn, is attempting to mate.
| 34 | 5 | "Capybara Casanova" | 16 May 2018 | 1.52 |
Two spider monkeys are born. The keepers pair up babirusas Sausu and Marjene for breeding. Naked mole-rat sisters Leftie and Rightie, who are both pregnant, battle for their mother's throne. Baby capybara Henry enjoys having the attention of all the females.
| 35 | 6 | "Giraffe Moving Day" | 23 May 2018 | 1.34 |
The keepers have to load Kidepo the Rothschild's giraffe into a trailer for his journey to France. Dobby the warthog is off to Germany, silvery gibbon Alvin is keen to get close to his partner Tilu again and Garry the caiman lizard is unlucky in love.

=== Season 6 (2018) ===
| No. overall | No. in series | Title | Original release date | UK viewers (millions) |
|---|---|---|---|---|
| 36 | 1 | "High Risk Pregnancy" | 31 October 2018 | 1.95 |
Asian elephant Thi is pregnant again, but keepers are worried for mum and her unborn baby. Male clownfish Polo gets injured while fighting with the other males for the attentions of dominant female Rosie. A new male giant anteater arrives as a potential mate for female Bliss, and Meru the Rothschild's giraffe is on a mission.
| 37 | 2 | "Never Too Late for Love" | 6 November 2018 | 1.90 |
Chimpanzee Zee Zee gives birth to daughter Stevie. Elderly Parson's chameleon Mr. Parsons has a date. Gaston the banteng has gotten three females in his herd pregnant.
| 38 | 3 | "Rhino Surprise!" | 14 November 2018 | 1.73 |
Solo the Malayan tapir is moving to a zoo in Germany. Pregnant Indian rhino Asha goes into labor at night. Dead Leaf Mantis Minnie is looking for a mate.
| 39 | 4 | "The Egg Swap" | 21 November 2018 | 1.83 |
Young meerkats Beagle and Huskie become parents for the first time. An overprotective spider monkey mother causes problems, fairy bluebirds Terang and Bulu have laid some eggs. and K'mana the African wild dog has an appointment with the vet.
| 40 | 5 | "Chimp Turf War" | 28 November 2018 | 1.57 |
Bush dog Mana is pregnant. There is a power struggle in the chimpanzee group, Wilma the wattled crane gets a new partner, Ivan. Wallace the Asian small-clawed otter is unwell.
| 41 | 6 | "Do You Love Me Red Panda?" | 5 December 2018 | 1.51 |
Koda the red panda arrives from Cornwall as a new mate for female, Nima. The meerkats have their paws full with a new pup, but all is not well. Red river hogs Mali and Confetti have two demanding youngsters, Lisala and Kinshasa.
| 42 | 7 | "First-Time Mom" | 12 December 2018 | 1.71 |
Radiated tortoises Bert and Terrance compete for the affections of breeding female Smooth Sides. Okapi K'Tusha is about to have her first baby. Eurasian black vultures Ethel and Eric have not mated yet and may need to be separated.
| 43 | 8 | "Bear-y Christmas!" | 20 December 2018 | 2.07 |
Keepers celebrate the arrival of Kyra, the UK's first surviving sun bear cub. The animals are given presents. There is a ceasefire with the otters and the babirusa. Pru the golden-headed lion tamarin is losing weight and spider Winston attempts to mate with Ruby.

=== Season 7 (2019) ===
| No. overall | No. in series | Title | Original release date | UK viewers (millions) |
|---|---|---|---|---|
| 44 | 1 | "The Disappearance of the Warty Pig" | 8 January 2019 | 1.81 |
An emergency is declared when Wendy the Visayan warty pig escapes her enclosure. Meanwhile, Narus the Rothschild's giraffe is moving to a new group at a zoo in the Netherlands, but only if his keepers can load him safely into the trailer. Keepers attempt to get pinstripe dambas Noel and Frida to mate.
| 45 | 2 | "Cheetah Brothers" | 15 January 2019 | 1.95 |
Vets examine elderly cheetah Matrah after he develops a limp. Sumatran orangutan Tuti has to prove she is responsible enough to look after her new sister. Keepers celebrate the arrival of incredibly rare babirusa piglets, but concerns are raised for the smallest of the litter.
| 46 | 3 | "Tough Love" | 22 January 2019 | 1.84 |
The keepers believe that two toed sloth Tina is pregnant. A new male is introduced to the zoo's mandrill group. Keepers tried to find a mate for blue poison dart frog Big Bertha and attempt to get Asiatic lions Kiburi and Iblis to have cubs.
| 47 | 4 | "Snakes in a Zoo" | 31 January 2019 | 1.62 |
When dik-dik Khari becomes dad to son Zayne, his fight or flight instinct goes into overdrive. The keepers have to replace a broken window in the habitat of reticulated pythons Bali and Jodie Foster. Pademelon Kai meets a female for the first time and Black rhino Malindi is moved to a calving pen to welcome her baby.
| 48 | 5 | "Otterly Love" | 7 February 2019 | 1.50 |
Spectacled bear Lima and her daughter Madidi are not getting along. Two Blue morpho butterflies get drunk on fermented fruit. After mate Diego moves to another zoo, giant otter Icana meets new mate Tarubu.
| 49 | 6 | "The Trials of Parenting" | 14 February 2019 | 1.59 |
Caribbean Flamingo Calypso loses interest in her chick Marley, leaving mate Rum to care for him. Three onagers are pregnant while Sulawesi macaque Rumple gives birth to daughter Rey.
| 50 | 7 | "Baby on Board" | 21 February 2019 | 1.73 |
Jaguars Napo and Goshi have not been breeding. Young Asian elephants Nandita and Aayu have fallen seriously ill. Young silvery gibbon Eko must mature when his parents Alven and Tilu have daughter Rayya. Keepers try to get katydid Beryl to have offspring.

=== Special (2019) ===
| No. overall | No. in series | Title | Original release date | UK viewers |
|---|---|---|---|---|
| 51 | 1 | "Chester Zoo Goes Underwater" | 23 May 2019 | 988,300 |
This deep water special explores the extraordinary underwater world of Chester Zoo. Keepers try to encourage Omani blind cave fish Tiny Tim to breed with the females. Humbolt penguin Frazzle pairs up with Panay as his mate for life. Keepers try to encourage breeding with Lake Patzcuaro salamanders Ophelia and Kevin and Popeye the chalk bass is suffering an eye problem.

=== Season 8 (2019) ===
| No. overall | No. in series | Title | Original release date | UK viewers (millions) |
|---|---|---|---|---|
| 52 | 1 | "Penguin House Hunters" | 31 October 2019 | 1.55 |
Chester Zoo embarks on a new treatment to save Asian elephant calf Indali. Humboldt penguins Almond and Walnut go house hunting, but an intruder is eyeing up their turf. In the zoo's aquarium, Banggai cardinalfish Richard is left to incubate partner Hyacinth's eggs in his mouth. Five male red ruffed lemurs join the zoo's ring-tailed lemur group.
| 53 | 2 | "Macaw 911" | 7 November 2019 | 1.53 |
Rothschild's giraffe Dagmar gives birth to a son, Mburo, but he struggles with his first steps. Blue-throated macaws sisters Lady and Girlie are divided after Girlie goes on the run. Meanwhile, the zoo's Sumatran orangutans recover from a fire that engulfed their enclosure. Keepers are concerned about a growth on mountain chicken frog Vera's eye.
| 54 | 3 | "Elephant Dynamics" | 14 November 2019 | 1.57 |
Keepers notice that the pups of Asian short-clawed otters Annie and Wallace are developing bald patches. Caribbean flamingo chicks are moved their creche to the main aviary but best friends Hazel and Cha-Cha face separation after Hazel develops a limp and has to stay behind. Young Asian elephant Anjan becomes a thug and annoys the rest of the herd. Dik-diks Khari and Shari have a daughter, Dalia.
| 55 | 4 | "The Birthing Journey" | 21 November 2019 | 1.66 |
Rothschild's giraffe Dagmar supports pregnant friend Orla, but at the same time struggles with caring for her son Mburo. Keepers are concerned about spider monkey Faye due to her poor track record with babies. Two Bactrian camels named Becky and Mei-Li face the trauma of separation when Becky goes for an operation. Keepers attempt to have Cabot's tragopan pheasants Bob and Wendy breed.
| 56 | 5 | "Playing Matchmaker" | 28 November 2019 | 1.41 |
Roy the chocolate poison dart frog faces competition from newcomer Hunter. The zoo's keepers hope that dusky pademelons Kai and Styx will have Chester Zoo's first pademelon joey. Sulawesi macaque Maggie is expecting her first child. Keepers are concerned about Asian forest tortoise Edna.
| 56 | 6 | "Something's Fishy" | 4 December 2019 | 1.25 |
Keepers are keen to breed some baby eastern bongos. Pinstripe damba George needs an immediate operation to prevent suffocation. Keepers introduce two prospective partners to elderly Parson's chameleon Mr. Parsons. Adolescent silvery gibbon Eko is putting his sister Rayya at risk.
| 57 | 7 | "A Very Merry Chester Zoo (Christmas)" | 11 December 2019 | 1.51 |
With Christmas approaching, young Rothschild's giraffes Mburo and Mojo miss out on their Christmas treat. Jealous camel Mei-Li gets the hump with new arrival Sparky. Mascara barb Clark has a date with three females named Kourtney, Kim and Khloe. Red panda Nina gives birth to twins Huey and Tiang.

=== Season 9 (2020) ===
| No. overall | No. in series | Title | Original release date = | UK viewers (millions) |
|---|---|---|---|---|
| 58 | 1 | "A Deer Family Welcome" | 13 February 2020 | N/A |
On Chimpanzee Island, dominant male Dylan is distracted by females, allowing the younger males in the group to test the pecking order. Pudus Odin and Serena welcome new daughter Amelia, but their son Lucas is intent on terrorising his new sister. At the zoo's aquarium, there is a battle for survival in the aquarium among the Indian mudskipper fish, who can exist both in and out of water. After her adolescent daughter Madidi leaves Chester Zoo, Andean bear Lima reunites with partner Bernie for the first time in two years.
| 59 | 2 | "Wishing for a Meerkat Miracle" | 20 February 2020 | N/A |
Dominant female meerkat Huskie appears to have lost her breeding instinct following the death of her son Junior. Sun bear Milli has her paws full caring for feisty daughter Kyra. The recent fire at the zoo appears to have stopped rhinoceros hornbills Liv and Manu from having chicks. Keepers prepare to reintroduce lowland anoa Oana to mate Teal'c after son Niko matures.
| 60 | 3 | "The Bermuda Skink Shuffle" | 27 February 2020 | N/A |
At Chester Zoo's reptile house, Bermuda skinks Sharkface and Poptart have a ferocious approach to mating. Rock hyraxes Nungu and Daissie have their eighth litter. Keepers wish for black rhinos Ema and Magadi to mate before Magadi leaves for another zoo. Elsewhere, Sula the babirusa has to be separated from son Tolo in order to have an operation.

=== Compilation Series (2020) ===
This series looks back at Chester Zoo over the last five years.

| No. overall | No. in series | Title | Original release date | UK viewers |
|---|---|---|---|---|
| 61 | 1 | "Extraordinary Births" | 26 August 2020 | N/A |
This episode looks back at births caught on camera at Chester Zoo. The episode includes a pregnant elephant and a wasp seeking a cockroach for a mate to paralyse with venom.
| 62 | 2 | "Together Forever" | 2 September 2020 | N/A |
This episode looks back at some of Chester Zoo's animal pairings, which includes penguins Rud and Spike and sloths Tina and Rico.
| 63 | 3 | "Great Escapes" | 9 September 2020 | N/A |
This episode looks back at some of Chester Zoo's expert escapologists. This episode features Sumatran Orangutan Subis and her children to Blue-Throated Macaw Girlie, Visayan warty pig Wendy and Andean Bear cub Madidi.

=== Series 10 (2021) ===
| No. overall | No. in series | Title | Original release date | UK viewers |
|---|---|---|---|---|
| 64 | 1 | "Protecting 007" | 10 August 2021 | N/A |
Keepers are curious when Margery the Malayan tapir is suddenly eating for two. Meanwhile, when a deadly virus is suspected of being the cause behind a female hyacinth macaw's untimely death, her partner James Bond must undergo tests and total isolation. Golden Mantella frog Eddie must summon up his stamina to court female Fergie whilst Thi, the head of Chester Zoo's Asian elephant herd is feeling her age.
| 65 | 2 | "The New Otter Brood" | 17 August 2021 | N/A |
After a long road, Giant Otter couple Icana and Tarubu welcome four pups and quickly discover the hardships of parenting. Batagur turtle Donatello has gone off his food due to a belly full of gravel and young red river hog Kya is being bullied by her sisters and needs to fight back. Gynandromorphic Jungle Nymph Taylor arrives at Chester Zoo.
| 66 | 3 | "Habitat Fit for a King" | 24 August 2021 | N/A |
Asiatic lion Iblis has a crisis of confidence while be transferred to a new habitat. There's been a bloodbath among the juvenile male vampire crabs, resulting in the keepers using CCTV to find the culprit. Andean bear Bernie suffers from a broken heart and a tooth ache whilst pygmy marmoset Baldrick arrives at Chester Zoo to be paired with female Zoe, but also has to stand up to her tamarin housemates.
| 67 | 4 | "Bongo Love Story" | 31 August 2021 | N/A |
Pregnant bongo Safi gives new partner Moti the runaround, making keepers suspect that she may give birth earlier than expected. Sunda gharial crocodiles Frank and Frankie need to have blood tests. A trio of silver-eared mesia chicks must find a way to survive when a fierce storm destroys their nest whilst Malagasy giant rat Gentle George faces surgery.
| 68 | 5 | "Survival of the Fittest" | 7 September 2021 | N/A |
Chimp Vila makes a bid for the job of dominant female but gets hurt by rival Alice. Four-year-old Sumatran tiger Kasarna is living in the shadow of her domineering mother Kirana and needs to find confidence in order to become a breeding female. Pink pigeon Rizzo meets male Kenickie whilst keepers hope that Chinese crocodile lizard sisters Drew and Lucy will breed with male Charlie.
| 69 | 6 | "Goodbye for Now" | 14 September 2021 | N/A |
Young rat snake Sen meets male Jakob, but will they mate or will Jakob eat Sen for dinner?. When Bornean Orangutan Sarkiei becomes sickly, keepers must separate her from prized son Tombol and Rothschild's giraffe Dagmar becomes dangerously thin, keepers must determine whether or not to part her from calf Mburo. The male giant otter pup is struggling to eat and walk.

== Reception ==
In 2018, The Secret Life of the Zoo received a nomination for the British Academy Television Award for Best Feature. However, it lost out to Cruising with Jane McDonald.

Gerard O'Donovan of The Daily Telegraph stated "For those who like their nature full of cute oohs and aahs, rather than red in tooth and claw, The Secret Life of the Zoo gently ticked all the boxes." O'Donovan's colleague Michael Hogan gave the opening episode of the fourth series a positive review, saying that it made him "emotionally invested as the devoted zookeepers." He found the "gently joyful documentary" was made all the more "uplifting" thanks to Colman's narration. He concluded, "it might have been no Blue Planet II but The Secret Life of the Zoo was equally enchanting in its own, more modest way."
