= Captain Eager and the Mark of Voth =

2008 film directed by Simon DaVision

The first film ever shot in Cardoscope

Captain Eager and the Mark of Voth is a 2008 science-fiction/comedy film directed by Simon DaVision, starring James Vaughan, Tamsin Greig, Mark Heap and Richard Leaf. The film parodies classic B-movies through its deliberately nonsensical, superfluous storyline, poor production values, laughable dialogue and weak, inconsistent performances.

The film was shot in London over a period of four weeks, with contributions from several CGI artists. In accordance with the production's knowing satire of cheesy sci-fi, the credits for Captain Eager claim that it was filmed using "Card-o-Scope", and that CGI stands for "Cardboard and Gum Imagery".

== Synopsis ==
Square-jawed hero Captain Eager is assigned the task of spying on Colonel Regamun, who has taken over the Veritan Sectot using a mysterious device known only as the "Mark of Voth".

Accompanied by his friends Professor Moon, Nurse Boobalicious, Scamp the Rocket Dog, Scrutty and Jenny, Eager must face down Regamun while also battling various alien monsters from his past adventures.

== Reception ==
The film polarised critics; while some appreciated the surreal tone and knowing satire, others were left infuriated by the deliberately idiotic storyline and claimed it was a one-joke movie.
