= Richard Leaf =

English actor

- Born: 1 January 1967 (age 59); England
- Occupation: Actor
- Years active: 1986–present
- Spouse: Tamsin Greig (m. 1997)
- Children: 3

Richard Leaf (born 1 January 1967) is a British actor.

He has had several small parts in television and stage productions. Leaf met actress Tamsin Greig at a wrap party after Neil Gaiman's 1996 miniseries Neverwhere finished recording. They married in 1997 and they have three children. The actor is notable for his role as the Governor of York, nephew of King Edward I in Mel Gibson's Braveheart. He appeared as Hannibal Lecter's father in the 2007 film Hannibal Rising. He also appeared as John Dawlish, an Auror, in the film Harry Potter and the Order of the Phoenix, and portrayed Jack, the bartender of the Cloverdilly public house, in the 2006 film Penelope.

== Filmography ==
=== Film ===
Year	Title	Role	Notes
1995	Braveheart	Governor of York	
1995	Jack & Sarah	Stoned Man	
1995	Cutthroat Island	Snake the Lookout	
1996	Mary Reilly	Screaming Girl's Father	
1997	The Fifth Element	Neighbour	
1997	This Is the Sea	Pastor Lamthorn	Credited as Rick Leaf
1997	A spasso nel tempo – L'avventura continua	Capo esercito inglese	
1997	Ecce Pirate	Ecce Pirate	Short film
1999	The Messenger: The Story of Joan of Arc	Conscience - Young Man	
2000	Best	Constable Davies	
2000	Maybe Baby	Justin Cocker	
2001	Enigma	Baxter	
2003	Extn. 21	Orman	Short film
2003	The Order	Sin Eater at St. Peters	AKA The Sin Eater
2003	The Man Who Drew Mice	Benson	Short films
2004	Beat	Leonard Skanes	Short films
2005	Derailed	Night Clerk Ray	
2006	Penelope	Jack the Bartender	
2007	The Seawatchers	Man	Short film
2007	Hannibal Rising	Father Lecter	
2007	Harry Potter and the Order of the Phoenix	John Dawlish	
2008	Captain Eager and the Mark of Voth	Colonel Regamun	
2010	A Throw of the Dice	Fate	Short film. Credit only
2011	Stop the World	—N/a	Short film. Writer and director
2019	The Friend	Matthew (voice)	Short films
2024	The Night Watch	Denton	Short films
2025	A Refugee	The Refugee	Short film. Also writer and producer

=== Television ===
Year	Title	Role	Notes
1986	Honor Thy Father	1st Killer	Television film
1989	Streetwise	Pawnbroker	Episode: "Money Talks"
1990	The Bill	Youth	Series 6; episode 26: "Beggars and Choosers"
1990	ScreenPlay Firsts	C.P. Ellis	Episode: "False Profit"
1990–1996	Jupiter Moon	Byron Wilkinson	Unknown episodes
1991	Trauma	Youth at Station	Television film
1992	Zorro	Reynaldo	Episode: "One Special Night"
1993	The Bill	Male Traveller	Series 9; episode 81: "Divided We Fall"
1993	15: The Life and Death of Philip Knight	Dr. Robert Jones	Television film
1993	The Buddha of Suburbia	Photographer	Mini-series; 2 episodes
1994	The Bill	Chris Perry	Series 10; episode 75: "Gate Fever"
1994	Heartbeat	Freddy	Episode: "Turn of the Tide"
1996	Neverwhere	Iliaster	Mini-series; 2 episodes: "Door" & "Knightsbridge"
1996	The Bill	Joey Simms	Series 12; episode 22: "Somebody's Home"
1997	A Dance to the Music of Time	Barnabas Henderson	Mini-series; episode: "Post War"
1998	Kavanagh QC	Martin Claydon	Episode: "Bearing Witness"
1998	Oktober	Bruno	Mini-series; 3 episodes
1999	Peak Practice	Dr. Patrick Berry	Episode: "Comrades in Arms"
2001	Relic Hunter	Village Priest	Episode: "Don't Go into the Woods"
2001	Shaka Zulu: The Citadel	(unknown)	2-part television film
2002	The Hidden City	Steven Matthews	Unknown episodes
2002	Silent Witness	Professor Henry Milton	Episode: "Closed Ranks: Part 1"
2004	Hardware	Daniel	Episode: "Nude"
2004	Agatha Christie: A Life in Pictures	Gunman	Television docudrama film
2005	If...	Marc Pavel	Episode: "If... Drugs Were Legal"
2005	Look Around You	Husband	Episode: "Food"
2005	Under the Greenwood Tree	Thomas Leaf	Television film
2011	Midsomer Murders	Evan Jago	Episode: "The Sleeper Under the Hill"

== Theatre ==
Year	Title	Role	Company	Director	Notes
1990	Saint Joan	The Inquisitor	Brunton Theatre, Musselburgh	Charles Nowosielski	play by George Bernard Shaw
