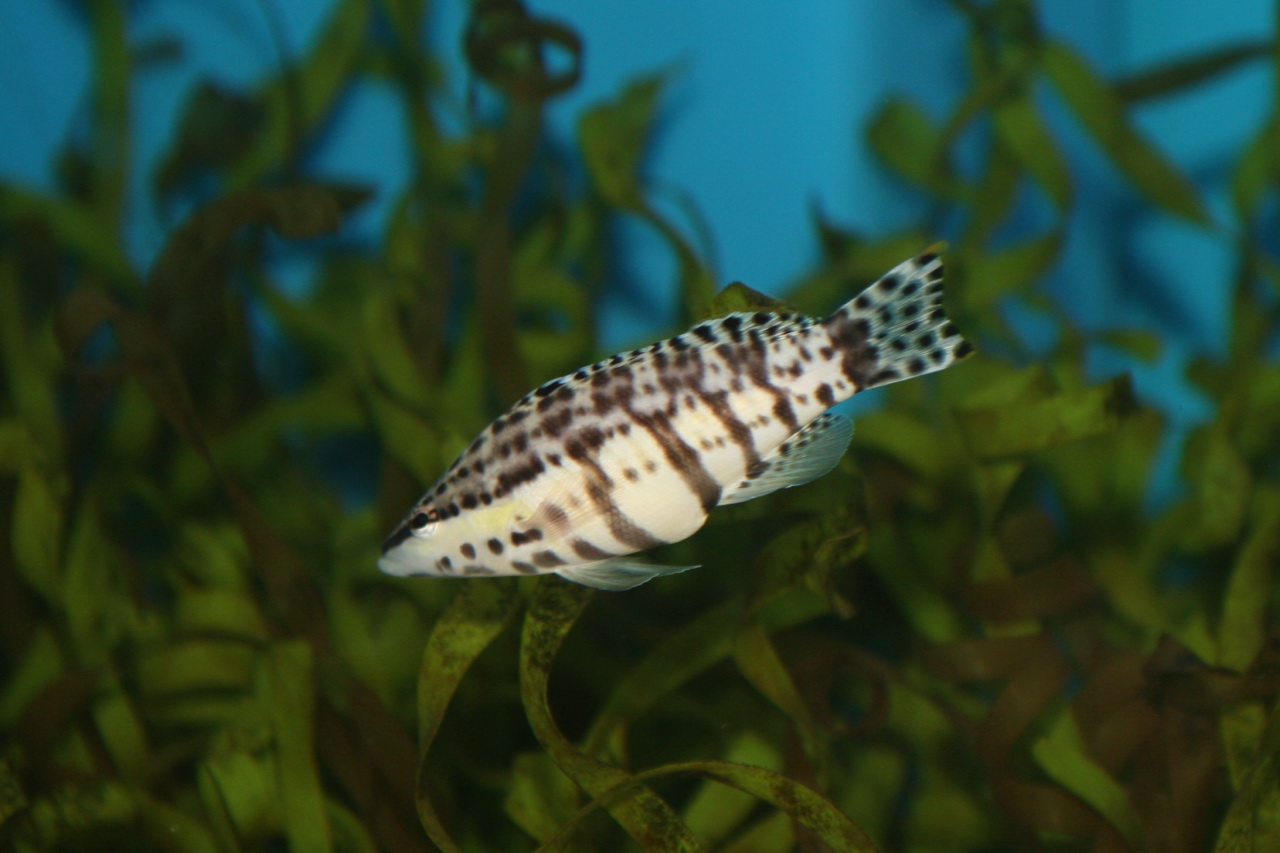

Conservation status
- Least Concern (IUCN 3.1)

Scientific classification
- Kingdom: Animalia
- Phylum: Chordata
- Class: Actinopterygii
- Division: Teleostei
- Order: Perciformes
- Family: Serranidae
- Genus: Serranus
- Species: S. tigrinus

Binomial name
- Serranus tigrinus (Bloch, 1790)

Synonyms
- Holocentrus tigrinus Bloch, 1790

= Serranus tigrinus =

Species of fish

Serranus tigrinus, the harlequin bass, is a species of marine ray-finned fish, a sea bass from the subfamily Serraninae, which is a part of the family Serranidae, which also includes the groupers and the anthias. It can be found in the western Atlantic Ocean, and also in aquarium trades.

== Description ==
Serranus tigrinus has a laterally compressed elongate body with a pointed snout which is shorter than the diameter of the eye. It has 3 clearly visible spines on the gill cover, the middle spine being straight. The margins of the preopercle are regularly serrated but there are no spines at its angle. The dorsal fin has 10 spines and 12 soft rays while the anal fin contains 3 spines and 7 soft rays. The caudal fin is slightly concave. This species has a black and white mottle pattern on its back and a yellow and black mottled pattern on the lower body. A black stripe runs from the snout through the eye, and the chin and throat have large black blotches on a white background. There are 8 vertical black bars, 2 on the nape and 6 on the body. The caudal fin has a black bar at its base and the membrane is marked with black spots. The dorsal fin has two lines of black spots along it while the base of the anal fin has a single line of black spots. The maximum published total length is 29 centimetres (11 in).

== Distribution ==
Serranus tigrinus is a species of the western Atlantic Ocean where it is found throughout the Caribbean from southern Florida to Trinidad and Tobago, including the mainland coast from the Yucatan Peninsula of Mexico to Venezuela.

== Habitat and biology ==
Serranus tigrinus is normally encountered as individuals or in pairs in the rocky parts of reefs or where there is scattered coral. It is found at depths of 0 to 40 metres (0 to 131 ft). It is a carnivorous species, and hunts by drawing prey, usually small crustaceans, into its large mouth and swallowing it whole. This species is a synchronous hermaphrodite, which means that they have both male and female reproductive organs and can take on a male or female role in spawning; self fertilisation is possible as well.

== Taxonomy ==
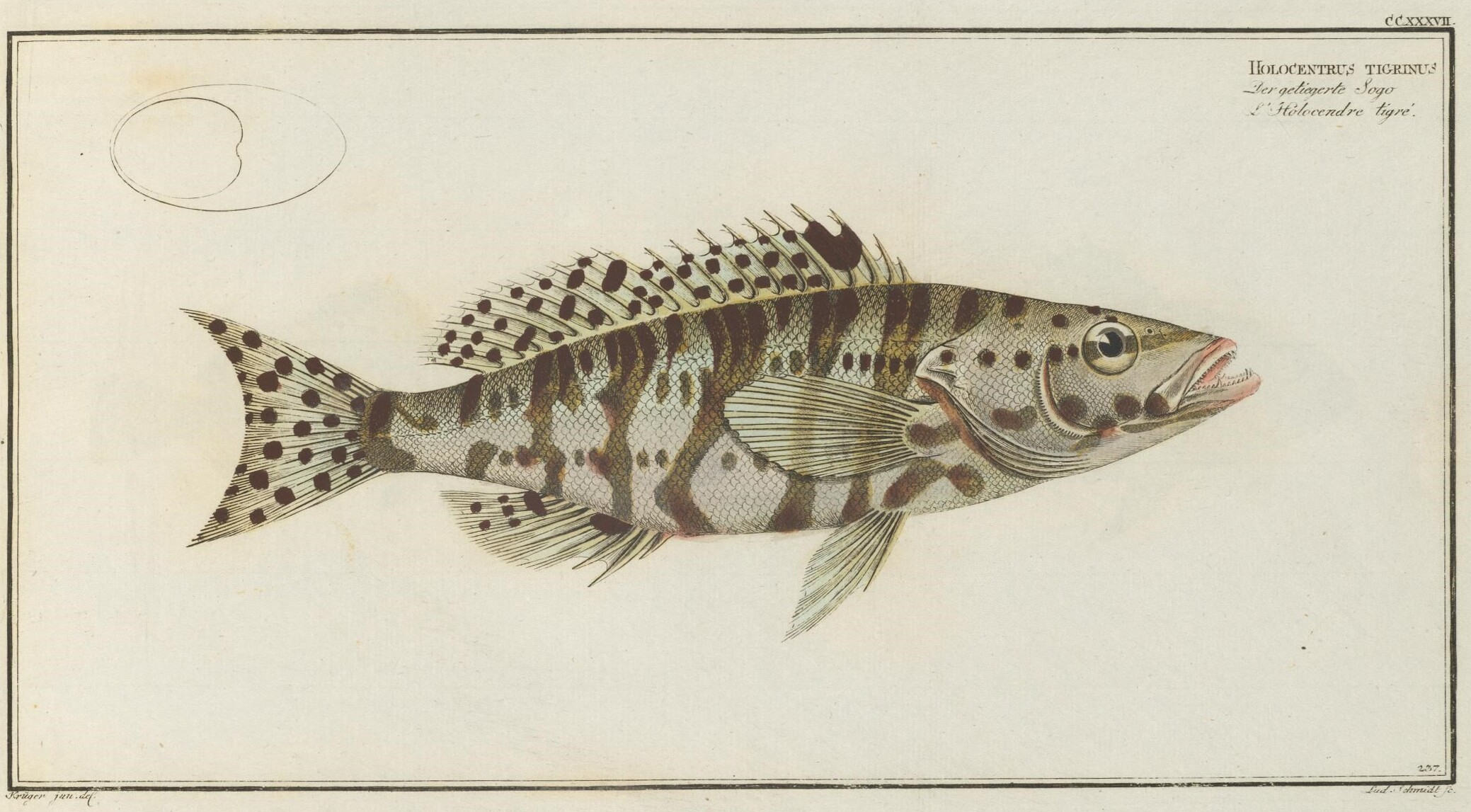
Serranus tigrinus in a publication by Marcus Elieser Bloch.

Serranus tigrinus was first formally described in 1790 as Holocentrus tigrinus by the German physician and naturalist Marcus Elieser Bloch (1723–1799) with the type locality given in error as the "Indian Ocean".

== Utilisation ==
Serranus tigrinus is found in the aquarium trade.
