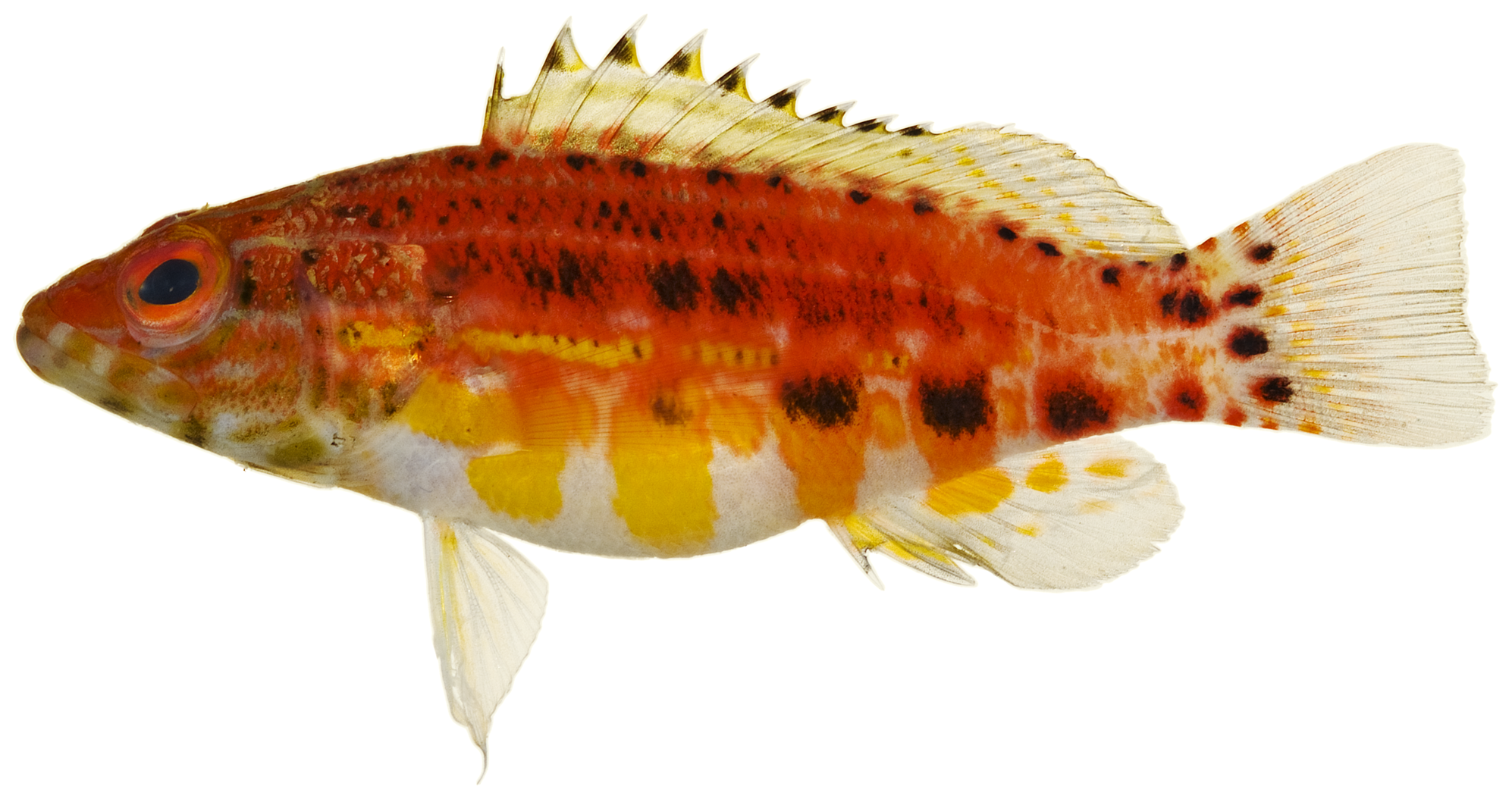
- Serranus baldwini
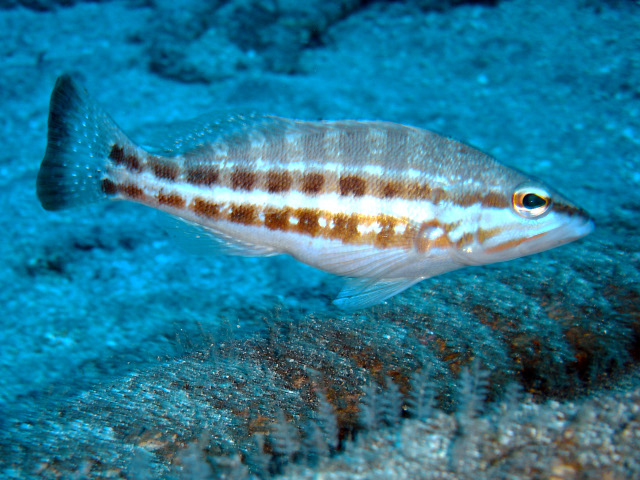
- Serranus cabrilla

Scientific classification
- Kingdom: Animalia
- Phylum: Chordata
- Class: Actinopterygii
- Division: Teleostei
- Order: Perciformes
- Family: Serranidae
- Genus: Serranus; G. Cuvier, 1816

Type species
- Perca cabrilla Linnaeus, 1758

Synonyms
- Hepatus Artedi, 1793; Mentiperca Gill, 1862; Neanthias Norman, 1931; Novanthias Whitley, 1937; Paracentropristis Klunzinger, 1884; Prionodes Jenyns, 1840; Serranellus D.S. Jordan, 1890

= Serranus =

Serranus Temporal range: Early Oligocene–present

Genus of fishes

Serranus is a genus of fish in the family Serranidae. It is one of five genera known commonly as the "Atlantic dwarf sea basses". These fish are hermaphrodites, each individual possessing functional male and female reproductive tissues. When a pair spawns, one fish acts as a male and the other acts as a female.

== Species ==
There are currently 34 recognized species in this genus:

- Serranus accraensis (Norman, 1931) (Ghanean comber)
- Serranus aequidens C. H. Gilbert, 1890 (Deep-water bass)
- Serranus aliceae Carvalho-Filho & C. E. L. Ferreira, 2013
- Serranus annularis (Günther, 1880) (Orange-back bass)
- Serranus atricauda Günther, 1874 (Blacktail comber)
- Serranus atrobranchus (Cuvier, 1829) (Black-ear bass)
- Serranus baldwini (Evermann & Marsh, 1899) (Lantern bass)
- Serranus cabrilla (Linnaeus, 1758) (Comber)
- Serranus chionaraia C. R. Robins & Starck, 1961 (Snow bass)
- Serranus drewesi Iwamoto, 2018 (Drewes' bass)
- Serranus flaviventris (Cuvier, 1829) (Twin-spot bass)
- Serranus fusculus (Poey, 1861) (twospot sea bass)
- Serranus hepatus (Linnaeus, 1758) (Brown comber)
- Serranus heterurus (Cadenat, 1937)
- Serranus huascarii Steindachner, 1900 (Flag bass)
- Serranus inexpectatus Wirtz & Iwamoto, 2018
- Serranus knysnaensis Gilchrist, 1904
- Serranus luciopercanus Poey, 1852 (Cross-hatch bass)
- Serranus maytagi C. R. Robins & Starck, 1961
- Serranus notospilus Longley, 1935 (Saddle bass)
- Serranus novemcinctus Kner, 1864 (Barred bass)
- Serranus papilionaceus Valenciennes, 1832
- Serranus phoebe Poey, 1851
- Serranus psittacinus Valenciennes, 1846 (Barred comber)
- Serranus pulcher Wirtz & Iwamoto, 2016 (São Tomé comber)
- Serranus sanctaehelenae Boulenger, 1895 (St. Helena comber)
- Serranus scriba (Linnaeus, 1758) (Painted comber)
- Serranus socorroensis G. R. Allen & D. R. Robertson, 1992 (Socorro bass)
- Serranus stilbostigma (D. S. Jordan & Bollman, 1890)
- Serranus subligarius (Cope, 1870) (Belted bass)
- Serranus tabacarius (Cuvier, 1829) (Tobaccofish)
- Serranus tico G. R. Allen & D. R. Robertson, 1998
- Serranus tigrinus (Bloch, 1790) (Harlequin bass)
- Serranus tortugarum Longley, 1935 (Chalk bass)

The following fossil species are known:

- †Serranus altus Gorjanović-Kramberger, 1882 - Middle to Late Miocene of Croatia & Turkey
- †Serranus gracilispinis Siebenrock, 1900 - Neogene of Bosnia
- †Serranus pentacanthus Heckel, 1861 - Middle Miocene of Austria
- †Serranus muelleri Rückert-Ülkümen, 1994 - Middle Miocene of Turkey
- †Serranus rudis Bassani, 1889 - Early Miocene of Italy
- †Serranus stiriacus Heckel, 1854 - Early Oligocene of Slovenia
- †Serranus validus Gorjanović-Kramberger, 1895 - Early Oligocene of Slovenia

In the past, various fossil fish from the Late Paleocene onwards have been classified within Serranus, making it a wastebasket taxon. However, such a classification is now known to be inaccurate, and likely a consequence of Serranus sharing a generalized morphology shared by various unrelated percomorphs. Some species formerly classified in the genus from the Eocene have been reclassified into new genera or synonymous with other non-serranid species.
