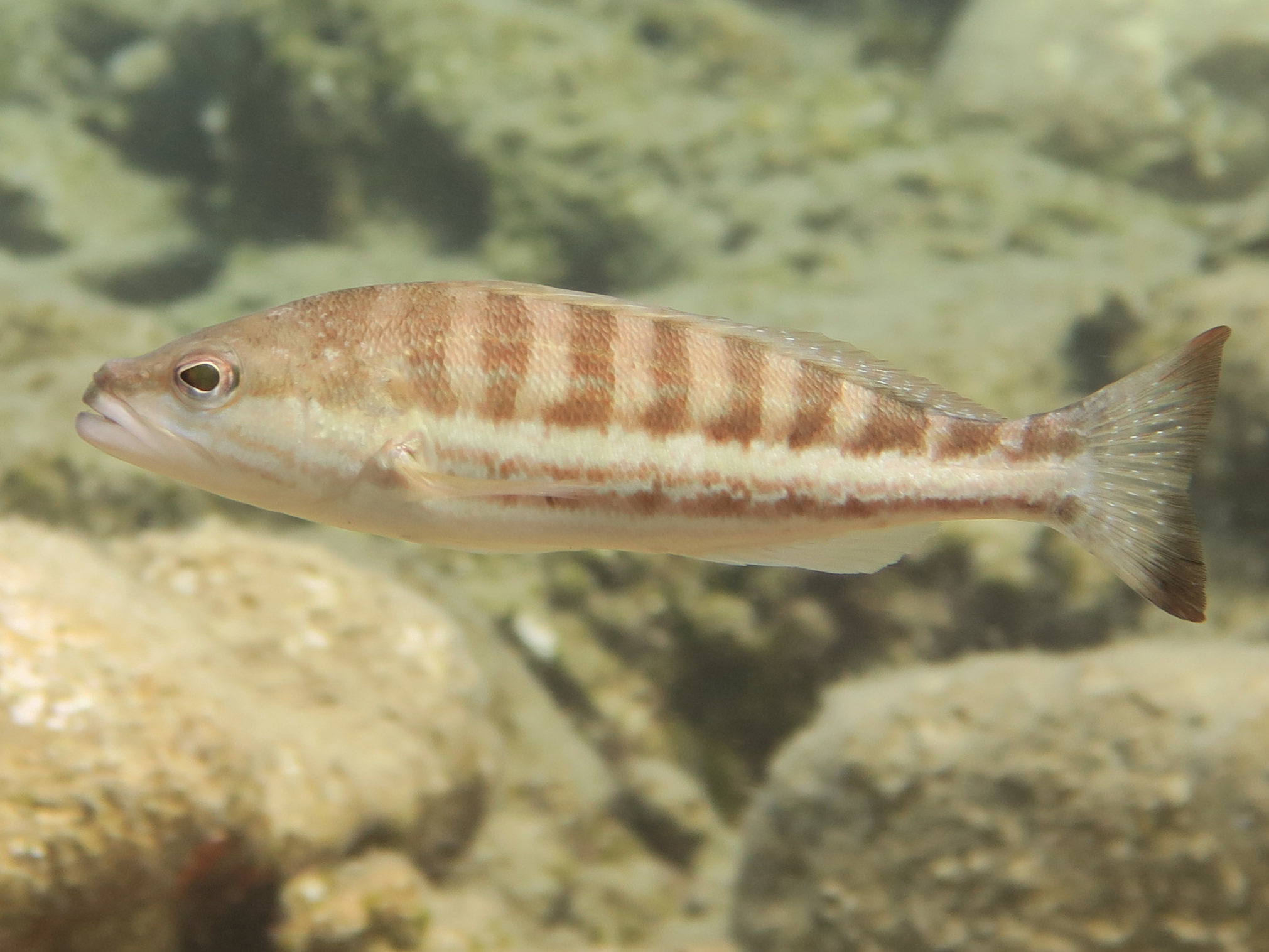

Conservation status
- Least Concern (IUCN 3.1)

Scientific classification
- Kingdom: Animalia
- Phylum: Chordata
- Class: Actinopterygii
- Division: Teleostei
- Order: Perciformes
- Family: Serranidae
- Genus: Serranus
- Species: S. cabrilla

Binomial name
- Serranus cabrilla (Linnaeus, 1758)

Synonyms
- Perca cabrilla Linnaeus, 1758; Paracentropristis cabrilla (Linnaeus, 1758); Serranus knysnaensis Gilchrist, 1904

= Comber (fish) =

Species of fish

The comber (/ˈkɒmbər/; Serranus cabrilla) is a species of marine ray-finned fish from the family Serranidae, the sea basses. It is widely distributed in the eastern North and South Atlantic Oceans and into the southwestern Indian Ocean. It is caught for food and fishmeal in some parts of its range.

== Description ==
The comber has a relatively stout body with a large head and a prominent jaw. It has two dorsal fins, the first has 11 thin spines and is joined to the second, which has 13–15 branched rays. The anal fin has 3 spines and 7–8 soft rays. The caudal fin is slightly truncate in shape. The colouration of the comber varies from light brown to dark brown to an intense reddish brown. It is marked with 7 to 9 darker transverse bands along its flanks, these are broken by a longitudinal white to yellowish stripe, running from the head to the tail. There are a few yellow or orange longitudinal lines on the sides of the head. The first dorsal fin is normally folded flat against the back when the fish is in the water. The comber can reach a standard length of 40 centimetres (16 in) but 25 centimetres (9.8 in) fish are more common.

== Distribution ==
The comber has an extensive distribution in the eastern Atlantic where it is found in the warmer waters in the south and southwest of England and off western Wales, south along the European coast, to the Straits of Gibraltar and into the Mediterranean and Black Seas. It also occur along the west coast of Africa from Morocco southwards to Angola. Combers are found around the islands of Macaronesia and São Tomé and Príncipe in the Gulf of Guinea. It also occurs off the coasts of South Africa where it is found from the Cape of Good Hope to KwaZulu-Natal. Records from the Red Sea were thought to be a result of Anti-Lessepsian migration from the Mediterranean via the Suez Canal. However, genetic analysis demonstrated that the Red Sea population must have existed before the opening of the Suez Canal.

== Habitat and biology ==
The comber occurs over the continental shelf and upper continental slope among rocks, Posidonia beds, and where there are substrates of sand and mud. It can be found to depths of 450 metres (1,480 ft). It is a predatory species which feeds mainly on crustaceans. Off the Canary Islands the diet varied with size, the smaller fish consuming more crabs while the larger fish ate carideans. Elsewhere their diet has been recorded as very varied and includes small and immature fish, annelids, squid and they have also been recorded scavenging on dead marine animals.

The comber is a solitary and territorial species. They spawn between May and July, and are hermaphrodites, mature fish having both ovaries and testes. They are capable of being either male or female, and there are known to have been instances of self-fertilisation where fish have been unable to locate a partner for spawning. Sexual maturity is attained when the fish reaches a length of 152 millimetres (6.0 in).

== Fisheries ==
The comber is of low commercial value, approximately 1,000 tons are landed from European waters. It is eaten as well as being processed for fishmeal.
