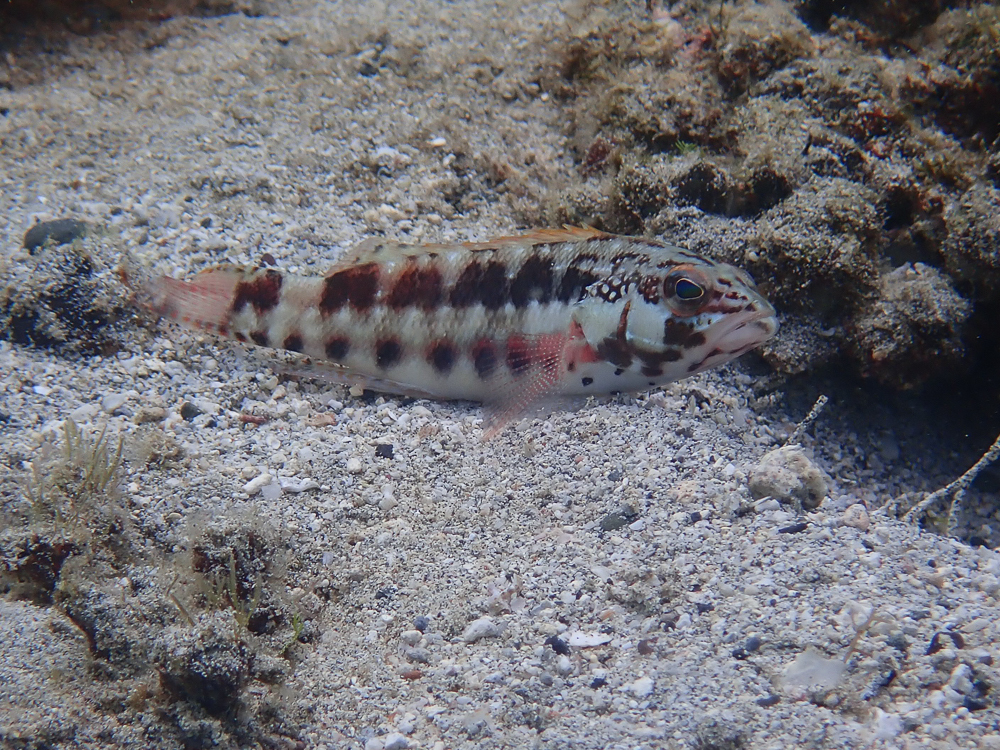

Scientific classification
- Kingdom: Animalia
- Phylum: Chordata
- Class: Actinopterygii
- Order: Perciformes
- Family: Serranidae
- Genus: Serranus
- Species: S. psittacinus

Binomial name
- Serranus psittacinus Valenciennes, 1846

= Serranus psittacinus =

Species of fish

Serranus psittacinus, also known by its common name barred serrano, is a species of fish from the genus Serranus.
