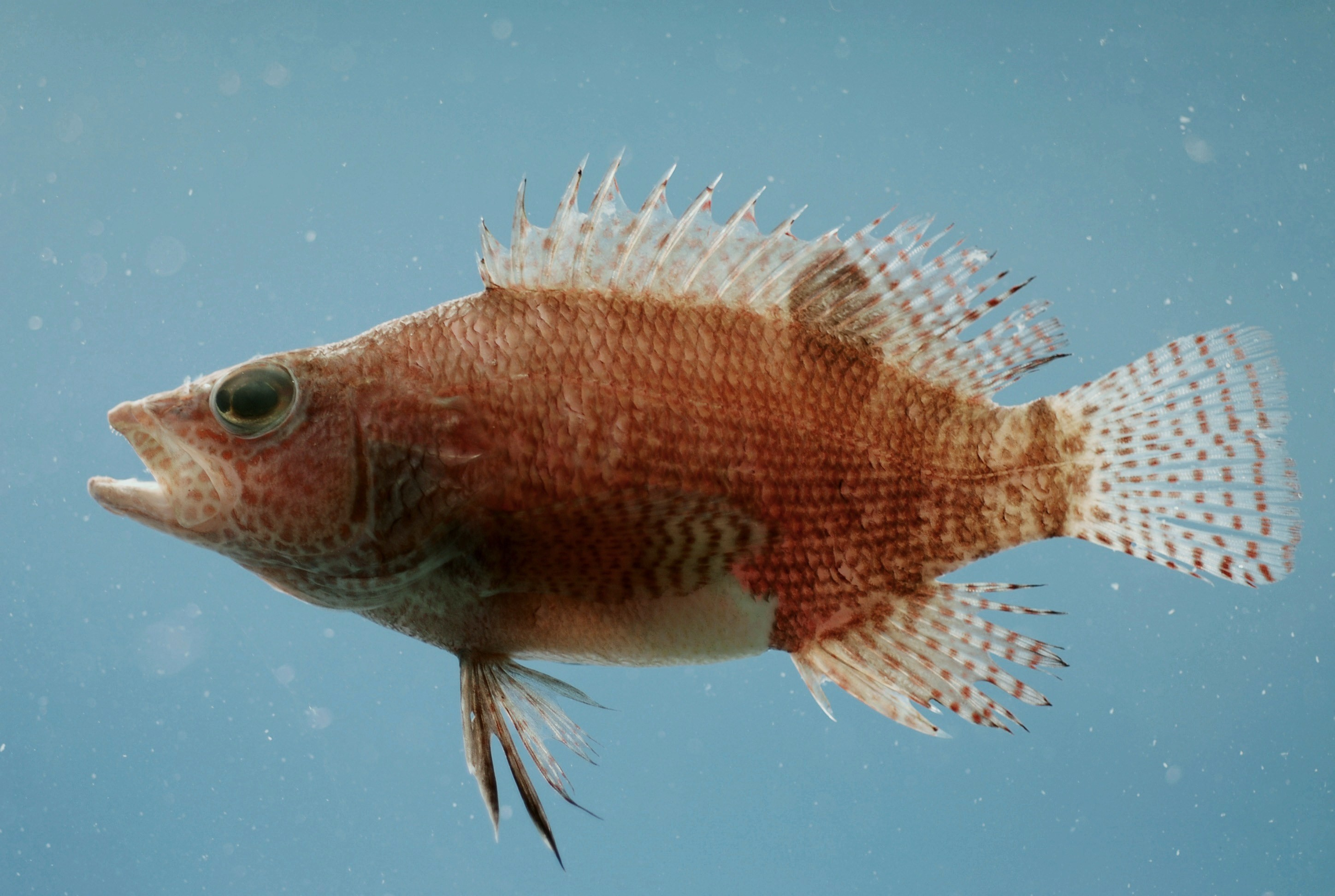

Conservation status
- Least Concern (IUCN 3.1)

Scientific classification
- Kingdom: Animalia
- Phylum: Chordata
- Class: Actinopterygii
- Order: Perciformes
- Family: Serranidae
- Genus: Serranus
- Species: S. subligarius

Binomial name
- Serranus subligarius (Cope, 1870)

Synonyms
- Centropristis subligarius Cope, 1870

= Belted sandfish =

Species of fish

The belted sandfish (Serranus subligarius), also known as the dwarf sea bass or stubby sea bass, is a species of marine ray-finned fish, a sea bass from the subfamily Serraninae, classified as part of the family Serranidae which includes the groupers and anthias. It is found in the western Atlantic Ocean. This species is found in the aquarium trade.

== Description ==
The belted sandfish has a laterally compressed elongate body with a relatively short, pointed snout. It has 3 clearly visible spines on the gill cover, the middle spine being straight. The margins of the preopercle are serrated. The dorsal fin has 10 spines and 12-14 soft rays while the anal fin contains 3 spines and 7 soft rays. The caudal fin is truncate. The head and body are reddish-brown in colour marked with lines created by a dark spot on the scales on the body. A dark stripe runs through the eye and reaches back to anterior part of the body. The posterior part of the body has 4 dark bars that run onto the dorsal fin, with the most forward bar being the most obvious and this bar extends onto the anterior of the soft rayes part of the dorsal as an obvious black blotch. There is a clear white bar in the middle of the lower part of the body, situated immediately in front of the most forward dark bar. There are wavy dark bars on the dorsal, anal and caudal fins and, in some fish, there is a pair of large black blotches at the base of the caudal fin. The pelvic fins are black with white leading edges. The belted sandfish attains a maximum recorded total length of 10 centimetres (3.9 in).

== Distribution ==
The belted sandfish is found in the western Atlantic Ocean. Its range extends north as far as North Carolina and from there it is found south along the eastern coast of the United States and into the Gulf of Mexico, where its range extends from northwestern Cuba and the Florida Keys north and west along the Gulf coast to the border between the United States and Mexico and along the coast of Mexico from Veracruz and Madagascar Reef on the Campeche Banks, and in the Caribbean Sea along the southern coast of Cuba.

== Habitat and biology ==
The belted sand fish is found silty waters where there is a substrate of mixed rubble and sand, often near jetties, rocky outcrops and artificial reefs. It can be found from the water's edge down to 18 metres (59 ft). It is a predatory species, the smaller fish, less than 40 millimetres (1.6 in) in total length, eat small crustaceans such as amphipods, gammarids and shrimp while the larger fish also ate amphipods but preyed on crabs, fishes and shrimp too. They are solitary fish which hunt close to the substrate, typically as the sun goes down. They capture prey by drawing it into their large mouth by creating a powerful suction as the mouth opens and then swallowing it whole. The belted sandfish is a synchronous hermaphrodite, i.e. the fish have both male and female functional gonads and self fertilisation is, at least, theoretically possible. This fish demonstrates three different types of mating strategy. Some fish behave as female, others are called streaker males and have an opportunistic strategy while courting males behave like males in gonochoristic species. Fish with lengths of less than 7.5 centimetres (3.0 in) are most commonly females while fish larger than that breed more often as courting males. The opportunistic streaker males tend to be smaller but can be of any size.

== Taxonomy ==
The belted sandfish was first formally described as Centropristis subligarius in 1870 by the American paleontologist and zoologist Edward Drinker Cope (1840-1897) with the type locality given as Pensacola in Florida.

== Utilisation ==
The belted sandfish is found in the aquarium trade.
