= Time Travel Is Dangerous =

British comedy film

Time Travel is Dangerous
- Theatrical release poster
- Directed by: Chris Reading
- Screenplay by: Chris Reading; Anna-Elizabeth Shakespeare; Hillary Shakespeare
- Produced by: Anna-Elizabeth Shakespeare; Hillary Shakespeare
- Starring: Ruth Syratt; Megan Stevenson; Sophie Thompson; Tony Way; Johnny Vegas
- Music by: Simon Porter
- Production company: Shakespeare Sisters Ltd.
- Release dates: 28 October 2024 (Austin); 28 March 2025 (United Kingdom)
- Running time: 99 minutes
- Country: United Kingdom
- Language: English

Time Travel is Dangerous is a 2024 British comedy film.

== Premise ==
Owners of a bric-a-brac shop travel through time stealing items to sell.

== Cast ==
- Ruth Syratt as Ruth
- Megan Stevenson as Megan
- Sophie Thompson as Valerie
  - Laura Aikman as Young Valerie
- Johnny Vegas as Robert/Botty
- Jane Horrocks as The Aviator
- Guy Henry as Martin
- Mark Heap as The Regency Dandy
- Stephen Fry as The Narrator
- Tony Way as Peter
- Brian Bovell as Ralph
  - Kiell Smith-Bynoe as Young Ralph
- Tom Lenk as Alex

== Production ==
The film is directed by Chris Reading and written by Reading with Anna-Elizabeth Shakespeare and Hillary Shakespeare, who are also producers on the film. Writer and director Chris Reading first met real-life vintage shop owners Ruth Syratt and Megan Stevenson in Muswell Hill, London in 2015 and first made a short film called The Unreason based around the concept of stealing things from the past to sell in the future. Anna and Hillary Shakespeare and Shakespeare Sisters Ltd then came aboard to develop the script into a feature length film.

The cast includes Ruth Syratt and Megan Stevenson as well as Johnny Vegas, Sophie Thompson, Jane Horrocks, Mark Heap, Tom Lenk, Tony Way with narration from Stephen Fry.

== Release ==
The film had its world premiere on 28 October 2024 at the Austin Film Festival. It was released in the United Kingdom on 28 March 2025.
