= NHS Together =

NHS Together is a campaign alliance of the health service unions in the United Kingdom and staff associations working with the TUC, which opposes any form of commercial competition with or within the National Health Service. It is made up of several unions, including UNISON and the British Medical Association.

== About ==
NHS Together is a group of organisations, largely health service trade unions, opposing any reforms which would involve privatisation or extension of private sector operation within the NHS. They claim that:

"We want to raise the alarm at what is happening to the NHS and to press the government for honest and open discussion about its reform agenda. The NHS has been getting better thanks to increased spending and the dedication and commitment of NHS workers to new ways of working. But progress is under threat:

- Health trust deficits are causing cuts in patient care and staff jobs
- NHS staff support reform that delivers better patient care, but that has been replaced by untested rapid changes with no staff involvement.
- The fragmentation of the NHS threatens the NHS values that bind it together."

Two main forms of protest that has been organised. One is a petition, calling upon the government to work closer with NHS staff and patients to improve the health service. A rally, entitled "I ♥ NHS" also took place on 3 November in London. About 7,000 people took part on the march, during which London Mayor Ken Livingstone gave a video message giving his support.

== Supporters ==
Other than health service unions, support has been given from other unions such as the National Union of Teachers. There has also been support from celebrities including Geoff Hurst, Ranulph Fiennes, Tamsin Greig, Arthur Smith and music band Four Kornerz.
