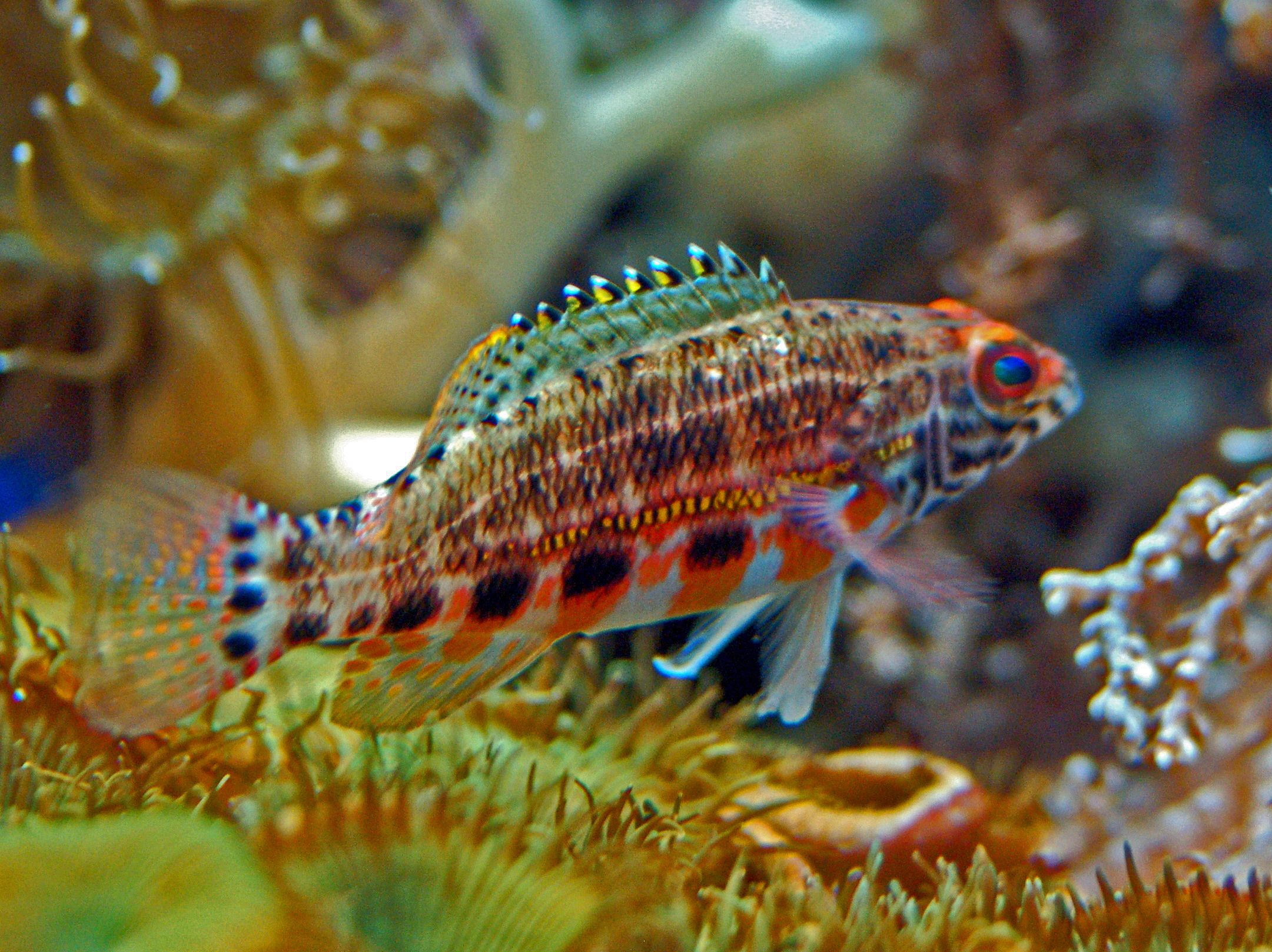
- Serranus baldwini at Monaco Aquarium

Conservation status
- Least Concern (IUCN 3.1)

Scientific classification
- Kingdom: Animalia
- Phylum: Chordata
- Class: Actinopterygii
- Order: Perciformes
- Family: Serranidae
- Genus: Serranus
- Species: S. baldwini

Binomial name
- Serranus baldwini (Evermann & Marsh, 1899)

Synonyms
- Prionodes baldwini Evermann & Marsh, 1899

= Serranus baldwini =

Species of fish

Serranus baldwini, the lantern bass, is a species of marine ray-finned fish, a sea bass from the subfamily Serraninae, classified as part of the family Serranidae which includes the groupers and anthias. It is found in the western Atlantic Ocean. The lantern bass is found in the aquarium trade.

== Description ==
Serranus baldwini has a cylindrical and elongated body, which is laterally compressed to a moderate extent and has a snout which has a length which is shorter than the diameter of the eye. There are 3 well-developed spines on the gill cover, with the middle spine being the largest and straightest. The preopercle has a regularly serrated edge. The dorsal fin contains 10 spines and 11-13 soft rays, while the anal fin has 3 spines and 7 soft rays. The caudal fin is slightly concave. The body is white broken by lines of dark to orange oblong-shaped blotches and spot. There is a noticeable row of dark, oblong blotches along the lower flank. There is a further row of 4 black spots on the caudal peduncle. Fish from deeper water have a red, orange or yellower hue compared to the paler fish from shallower water. This species attains a maximum total length of 12.0 centimetres (4.7 in).

== Distribution ==
Serranus baldwini is found in the western Atlantic Ocean where it ranges from Jacksonville, Florida southwards along the Florida coast and around the Bahamas. Its range extends into the Gulf of Mexico including the Florida Keys and northwards. It is also found along the Mexican coast from Campeche and on the northern coast of the Yucatán Peninsula and from northwestern Cuba throughout the Caribbean, and along the coast of Central America and South America as far south as São Paulo in Brazil.

== Habitat and biology ==
Serranus baldwini is a marine reef-associated species, living in rocky and weedy areas at a depth of 1 – 80 m. It shows a strong association with beds of turtle grass (Thalassia testudinum), although juveniles use the empty shells of conches to hide in. It is a territorial species which feeds on shrimps and smaller fishes. It is synchronously hermaphroditic, i.e. fish can be either male or female when spawning but the social structure involves a territorial fish which is the largest of the group functionally male and a harem of hermaphrodites. The male fish is the most successful at producing offspring by mating as a male with the hermaphrodites but the hermaphrodites also mate with each other but do not have the quantity of progeny that the male fish is able to father.

== Taxonomy ==
Serranus baldwini was first formally described as Prionodes baldwini by the American ichthyologists Barton Warren Evermann (1853-1932) and Millard Caleb Marsh (1872-1936) with the type locality given as Culebra, Puerto Rico. The specific name honours the artist on the expedition of December 1898 aboard the United States Fish Commission steamer Fish Hawk to Puerto Rico which collected the type, Albertus Hutchinson Baldwin (1865-1935).

== Utilisation ==
Serranus baldwini is used within the aquarium trade.

== Bibliography ==
- Eschmeyer, William N., ed. 1998. Catalog of Fishes. Special Publication of the Center for Biodiversity Research and Information, n. 1, vol. 1-3. California Academy of Sciences. San Francisco, California, United States. 2905. ISBN 0-940228-47-5.
- Fenner, Robert M.: The Conscientious Marine Aquarist. Neptune City, New Jersey, United States : T.F.H. Publications, 2001.
- Helfman, G., B. Collette y D. Facey: The diversity of fishes. Blackwell Science, Malden, Massachusetts, United States, 1997.
- Hoese, D.F. 1986: A M.M. Smith and P.C. Heemstra (ed.) Smiths' sea fishes. Springer-Verlag, Berlín, Germany.
- Maugé, L.A. 1986. A J. Daget, J.-P. Gosse and D.F.E. Thys van den Audenaerde (ed.) Check-list of the freshwater fishes of Africa (CLOFFA). ISNB, Bruselas; MRAC, Tervuren, Flandes; ORSTOM, Paris, France. Vol. 2.
- Moyle, P. and J. Cech.: Fishes: An Introduction to Ichthyology, 4a. ed., Upper Saddle River, New Jersey, United States: Prentice-Hall. Year 2000.
- Nelson, J.: Fishes of the World, 3a. ed. New York City, United States: John Wiley and Sons. year 1994.
- Wheeler, A.: The World Encyclopedia of Fishes, 2a. ed., London: Macdonald. Year 1985.
