= Packet of Three (TV series) =

1991 British television series

- Also known as: Packing Them In
- Genre: Comedy sitcom
- Starring: Frank Skinner; Jenny Eclair; Henry Normal (series 1); Roger Mann (series 2); Kevin Eldon (series 2)
- Country of origin: United Kingdom
- Original language: English
- No. of series: 2
- No. of episodes: 16

Production
- Running time: 30 minutes
- Production company: Jon Blair Film Company

Original release
- Network: Channel 4
- Release: 2 August 1991 – 4 November 1992

Packet of Three, re-titled as Packing Them In for the second series, is a comedy series broadcast by Channel 4 between 2 August 1991 and 4 November 1992. It starred Frank Skinner, Jenny Eclair and Henry Normal. It was set in the fictional Crumpsall Palladium with scenes filmed at Wakefield's Theatre Royal in front of a live theatre audience. For the re-titled second series, Normal was replaced by Roger Mann and Kevin Eldon.

== Reception ==
In 1998, The Guardian described Packet of Three as "wince-inducing".
