= Tamsin Greig =

British actress (born 1966)

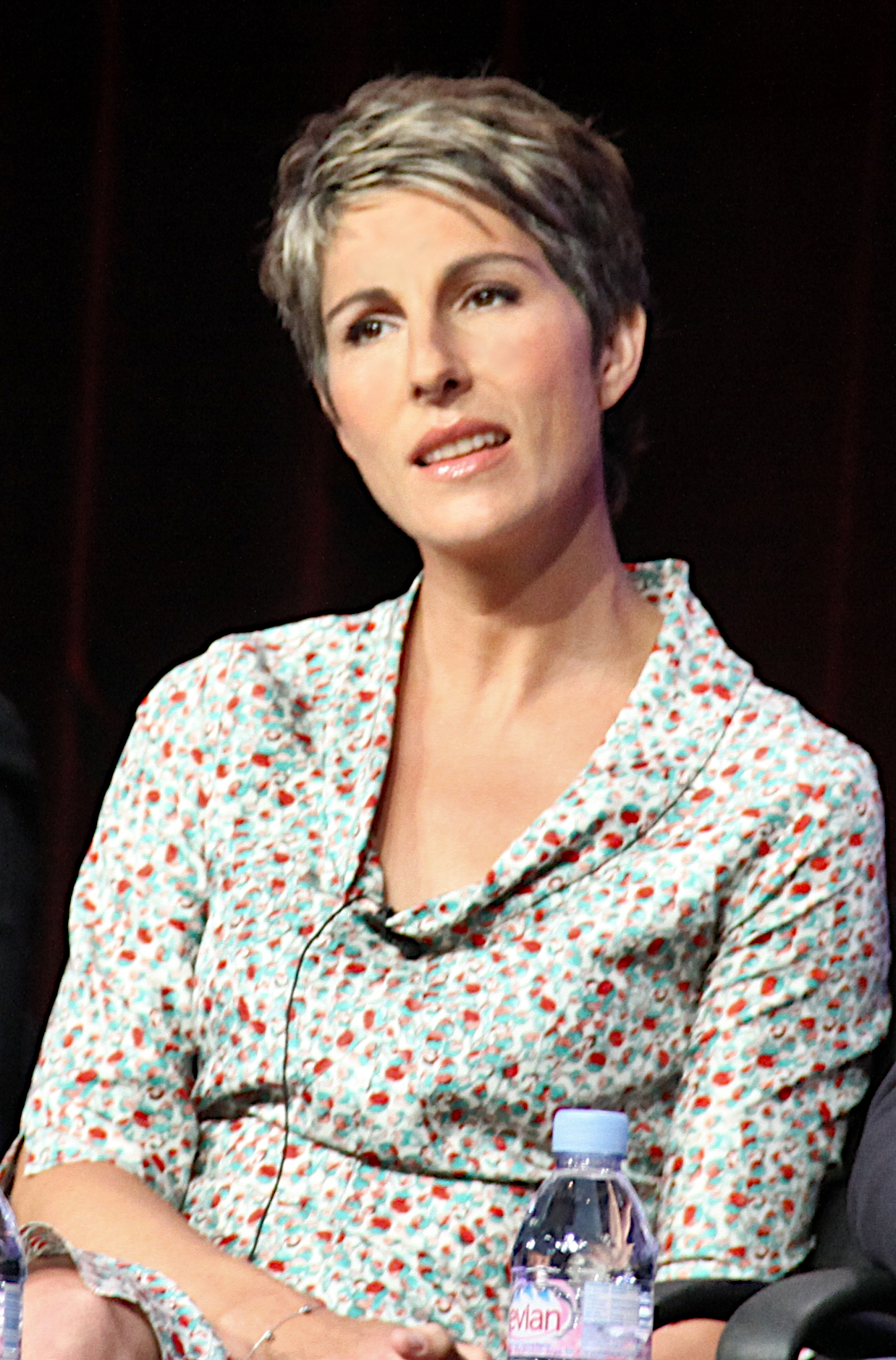
- Greig in 2010
- Born: Tamsin Margaret Mary Greig; 12 July 1966 (age 60); Maidstone, Kent, England
- Education: University of Birmingham (BA)
- Occupation: Actress
- Years active: 1990–present
- Spouse: Richard Leaf (m. 1997)
- Children: 3

Tamsin Margaret Mary Greig (/ˈtæmzɪn ˈɡrɛɡ/; born 12 July 1966) is a British actress. She is known for both dramatic and comedic roles. She played Fran Katzenjammer in the Channel 4 sitcom Black Books, Dr Caroline Todd in the Channel 4 sitcom Green Wing, Beverly Lincoln in British–American sitcom Episodes and Jackie Goodman in the Channel 4 sitcom Friday Night Dinner. Other roles include Alice Chenery in BBC One's comedy-drama series Love Soup, Debbie Aldridge in BBC Radio 4's soap opera The Archers, Miss Bates in the 2009 BBC version of Jane Austen's Emma, and Beth Hardiment in the 2010 film version of Tamara Drewe. In 2020, Greig starred as Anne Trenchard in Julian Fellowes' ITV series Belgravia.

Greig is also a stage actress: she won a Laurence Olivier Award in 2007 for Much Ado About Nothing and received nominations in 2011 and 2015 for her roles in The Little Dog Laughed and Women on the Verge of a Nervous Breakdown.

== Early life ==
Greig was born in Maidstone, Kent, the second of three sisters. Her father, Eric (1906–1998), worked as a colour chemist creating dyes, and her mother, Ann (1933–2001), was enthusiastic about amateur dramatics. There was a 27-year age gap between her parents, with her father being 60 years old when Greig was born. The family moved to Kilburn when she was three.

She went to senacre high school followed by Camden School for Girls, and obtained a first-class BA (hons) in Drama and Theatre Arts from the University of Birmingham in 1988. After graduating she worked at the Family Planning Association and continued temporary work until 1996. She also spent some time at a secretarial college.

== Career ==
=== Radio ===
Greig has had a long-running part as Debbie Aldridge in the BBC Radio 4 soap opera The Archers since 1991. As her other work increased, her appearances in the show decreased and her character spends most of her time living and working in Hungary.

Her other radio work includes narrating the Radio 4 comedy Warhorses of Letters, and guest-starring in five episodes of the second series of the radio version of Absolute Power, playing Charles Prentiss's former lover Gayle Shand, who now runs a rival firm.

=== Television ===
Greig appeared in supporting parts, notably as Lamia in Neverwhere (1996) and The Mother in an episode of People Like Us (2000). Her first major role was Fran Katzenjammer in the sitcom Black Books, which ran for three series from 2000. Fran was a friend of the main character, Bernard, and originally owned a gift shop called "Nifty Gifty" next door to his bookshop.

In 2004 she played continually embarrassed surgical registrar Dr Caroline Todd, the lead character in the Channel 4 comedy drama series Green Wing. Her performance won her "Best Comedy Performance" in the 2005 Royal Television Society Awards. She also appeared as Caroline in an appearance at The Secret Policeman's Ball.

She starred in the BBC comedy drama series Love Soup (2005), as Alice Chenery, a lovelorn woman working on a department store perfume counter, in a role specifically written for her by David Renwick, whom she met in 2003 when she appeared in an episode of Jonathan Creek. In May 2005 she also appeared as a nurse in an episode of the BBC series Doctor Who, entitled "The Long Game".

Greig appeared in the role of Edith Frank in the BBC's January 2009 production of The Diary of Anne Frank. Also in 2009, she appeared as Miss Bates in the BBC serial Jane Austen's Emma. In 2010, she played Sacharissa Cripslock in the two part mini-series Terry Pratchett's Going Postal.

In 2011, she starred in the BBC/Showtime sitcom Episodes, alongside Matt LeBlanc and Green Wing co-star Stephen Mangan. Greig and Mangan play a husband-and-wife writing duo who travel to America to work on an adaptation of their successful series. Greig also stars in the Channel 4 sitcom, Friday Night Dinner, as Jackie Goodman, the mother of a North London Jewish family.

She played Beth in the 2012 BBC series White Heat. She is also the lead in The Guilty in the three-part series on ITV in 2013, playing DCI Maggie Brand who investigates the death of a young child who went missing five years previously. In 2014, she played Sally in the Inside No. 9 episode "Last Gasp".

In 2015 the fourth season of Episodes was aired, and in 2016 a seven-episode fifth season, still starring Greig alongside Stephen Mangan and Matt LeBlanc, was filmed in London.

Greig narrated the sixth series of The Secret Life of the Zoo, taking over from Olivia Colman, in 2018.

Greig has received three BAFTA nominations for her TV work. She was nominated for Best Comedy Performance for Green Wing in 2005, and for Best Female Comedy Performance for Friday Night Dinner in 2012 and Episodes in 2015.

=== Theatre ===
During 2006 and early 2007, Greig played Beatrice in a much acclaimed production of Much Ado About Nothing for which she won a Laurence Olivier Award, and Constance in King John, as part of the Royal Shakespeare Company's The Complete Works season. Whilst the win itself was a surprise, her acceptance speech was received very well as being highly entertaining, claiming that she was so excited that she had wet her dress. The speech was apparently completely improvised. Backstage, when told not to tell her mother about her wetting her dress, she told the host that her mum was dead before dedicating her award to her "dead mum". She also won the Critics' Circle Theatre Award for "Best Shakespearean Performance" in Much Ado About Nothing, becoming the first woman to win the award, and was nominated for "The FRANCO'S Best Actress in a Play" in the Whatsonstage Theatregoers' Choice Awards.

At the Gielgud Theatre in March 2008, she co-starred with Ralph Fiennes, Janet McTeer and Ken Stott in the UK premiere of Yasmina Reza's The God of Carnage (Le Dieu du carnage) translated by Christopher Hampton and directed by Matthew Warchus. The play won the Laurence Olivier Award for Best New Comedy in 2009. In 2008, she co-starred in the surreal sci-fi film Captain Eager and the Mark of Voth.

In November 2008 she made her National Theatre debut in Gethsemane, a new play by David Hare which toured the UK. Greig starred in The Little Dog Laughed by Douglas Carter Beane at the Garrick Theatre in London, which ran a limited season until 10 April 2010. She starred alongside Rupert Friend, Gemma Arterton and Harry Lloyd, and the play was directed by Jamie Lloyd. She won the 2011 WhatsOnStage Theatregoers Choice Award for Best Supporting Actress in a play for her portrayal. Her performance as Diane in The Little Dog Laughed garnered her a second Olivier Award nomination for Best Actress. In October 2011 she was Hilary, the central character, in Jumpy at the Royal Court, London., which later transferred to the Duke of York's Theatre in the West End. In March 2013 she played Varia in Longing, a new play by William Boyd based on two short stories by Chekhov, at the Hampstead Theatre. Greig previously performed in Women on the Verge of a Nervous Breakdown at the Playhouse Theatre, London, until May 2015. In March 2015, she received a nomination for the Laurence Olivier Award for Best Actress in a Musical.

In October 2016 she returned to the Hampstead Theatre to play Empty in The Intelligent Homosexual's Guide to Capitalism and Socialism with a Key to the Scriptures by Tony Kushner. In February 2017 she returned to the Royal National Theatre to play Malvolia in a new production of Twelfth Night at the Olivier Theatre. As a Labour constituency agent spanning a period of 27 years, she gave a "polished ... magnificent" performance in James Graham's Labour of Love at the Noël Coward Theatre, London, in October 2017.

=== Film ===
Greig made a cameo appearance in the 2004 comedy Shaun of the Dead. She starred with Richard E. Grant in the 2009 film Cuckoo and with Roger Allam and Gemma Arterton in Tamara Drewe (2010). The last role earned Greig a British Independent Film Awards nomination for Best Supporting Actress. She co-starred in 2015's comedy-drama The Second Best Exotic Marigold Hotel and in the 2016 release of Breaking the Bank, opposite Kelsey Grammer.

== Personal life ==
In 1996, Greig moved back to Kensal Green, where she is still living as of 2011, to be with her dying father. Raised as an atheist, she became a Christian at this time. She has Jewish ancestry. She also is a vegetarian.

In 1997 Greig married actor Richard Leaf, whom she met at a wrap party of Neil Gaiman's 1996 miniseries Neverwhere, and has three children: Jakob, Nathanael and Roxie, born in 1999, 2000 and 2004 respectively.

In 2007, Greig gave her backing to a rally organised by pro-National Health Service protest group NHS Together. She also supports more practical teaching of Shakespeare in British schools, supporting the Royal Shakespeare Company's "Stand Up For Shakespeare" manifesto. She is one of 200 public figures who were signatories to a letter to The Guardian opposing Scottish independence in the run-up to the 2014 referendum.

== Acting credits ==
=== Film ===
Year	Title	Role	Notes
1997	So This is Romance?	Carmen	
2002	Miranda	Receptionist	
2002	Pure	Liaison Officer	
2004	Shaun of the Dead	Maggie	
2008	Captain Eager and the Mark of Voth	Jenny	
2009	Cuckoo	Simon	
2010	Tamara Drewe	Beth Hardiment	
2014	Breaking the Bank	Penelope	
2015	The Second Best Exotic Marigold Hotel	Lavinia Beech	
2019	Official Secrets	Elizabeth Wilmshurst	
2020	Days of the Bagnold Summer	Astrid	
2023	My Happy Ending	Nancy	

=== Television ===
Year	Title	Role	Notes
1994	Blue Heaven	Prof. Wiseman	1 episode
1996	Neverwhere	Lamia	3 episodes
1996	Faith in the Future	Emma	Episode: "Marks Out of Ten"
1997	Wycliffe	Dr. Hinkley	Episode: "Seen a Ghost"
1997–1998	Blind Men	Valerie Marsden	6 episodes
1998	The Great Egyptians	Cleopatra	TV Miniseries documentary
1999–2001	People Like Us	Jenny, Sarah	2 episodes
2000–2004	Black Books	Fran	Main Role
2001	High Stakes	Delphina	Episode: "Soul Mates"
2001	Happiness	Emma	3 episodes
2001	World of Pub	Julia Robbins	Episode: "Bookshop"
2002	Falling Apart	Jackie	TV movie
2003	Jonathan Creek	Pam	Episode: "Angel Hair"
2003	Ready When You Are, Mr. McGill	Liane	TV movie
2004	The Lenny Henry Show	various	1 episode
2004	When I'm 64	Denny	TV movies
2004–2006	Green Wing	Dr Caroline Todd	Main role
2005	Doctor Who	Nurse	Episode: "The Long Game"
2005–2008	Love Soup	Alice Chenery	Main role
2009	The Diary of Anne Frank	Edith Frank	Miniseries
2009	Emma	Miss Bates	TV serial
2010	Masterpiece Classic	Edith Frank	1 episode
2010	Terry Pratchett's Going Postal	Miss Cripslock	TV miniseries
2011	White Heat	Beth Pew	TV miniseries, 6 episodes
2011–2017	Episodes	Beverly Lincoln	Main role
2011–2020	Friday Night Dinner	Jackie Goodman	Main role
2013	The Guilty	DCI Maggie Brand	Main role
2014	Inside No. 9	Sally	Episode: "Last Gasp"
2015	Royal Cousins at War	Narrator	2 episodes
2015	Crackanory	Storyteller	Episode: "Bob's House"
2016	Behold the Monkey	Narrator	TV film
2016	Revolting Rhymes	Babysitter/Miss Maclahose/Grandma (voice)	TV film
2017	Diana and I	Mary McDonald	TV film
2018	To Provide All People	GP	TV film
2018–2021	The Secret Life of the Zoo	Narrator	Series 6–10
2019	Elementary	DCI Athelney Jones	Episode: "The Further Adventures"
2019	The Tiger Who Came to Tea	Mummy (voice)	TV short
2019	Bing	Dr. Molly (voice)	Series 2
2020	Belgravia	Anne Trenchard	Lead Role – TV Series
2020	Talking Heads	Rosemary Horrocks	Episode: "Nights in the Gardens of Spain"
2020–present	Love Monster	Narrator	54 episodes
2021	Romeo and Juliet	Lady Capulet	Television film
2021	Friday Night Dinner: 10 Years and A Lovely Bit of Squirrel	Herself	TV documentary
2021	The Amazing Mr Blunden	Mrs Wickens	Television film
2024	Sexy Beast	Cecilia	Main cast
2024	The Completely Made-Up Adventures of Dick Turpin	Helen Gwinear	2 episodes
2024	Suspect	Natasha Groves	8 episodes
2025	Riot Women	Holly	Main cast
2027	Hercule	TBA	Main cast

=== Theatre ===
Year	Title	Role	Notes
2006	King John	Constance	Royal Shakespeare Company (RSC)
2006–2007	Much Ado About Nothing	Beatrice	Royal Shakespeare Company (RSC)
2008	God Of Carnage	Anette	Gielgud Theatre, West End
2008	Gethsemane	Meredith	National Theatre, London
2010	The Little Dog Laughed	Diane	Garrick Theatre, West End
2011	Jumpy	Hilary	Royal Court Theatre, Duke of York's Theatre
2013	Longing	Varia	Hampstead Theatre
2015	Women on the Verge of a Nervous Breakdown	Pepa Marcos	Playhouse Theatre, West End
2016	The Intelligent Homosexual's Guide to Capitalism and Socialism with a Key to the Scriptures	Empty	Hampstead Theatre
2017	Twelfth Night	Malvolia	National Theatre, London
2017	Labour of Love	Jean Whittaker	Noël Coward Theatre, West End
2018	Pinter 3: Landscape/A Kind of Alaska	Beth/Deborah	Harold Pinter Theatre, West End
2020	Talking Heads Live: Nights in the Garden of Spain	Rosemary	Bridge Theatre
2021	Peggy For You	Peggy Ramsay	Hampstead Theatre
2025	Backstroke	Bo	Donmar Warehouse

=== Audio ===
Year	Title	Role	Notes
2012	The Minister of Chance	The Sage of the Waves	

== Awards and nominations ==
Year	Award	Category	Nominated work	Result
2005	British Comedy Awards	Best TV Comedy Actress	Green Wing, Love Soup	Nominated
2005	Royal Television Society Awards	Best Comedy Performance	Green Wing	Won
2005	British Academy Television Awards	Best Comedy Performance	Green Wing	Nominated
2006	British Comedy Awards	Best TV Comedy Actress	Green Wing	Nominated
2006	Critics' Circle Theatre Awards	Best Shakespearean Performance	Much Ado About Nothing	Won
2007	Olivier Awards	Best Actress	Much Ado About Nothing	Won
2008	Monte-Carlo Television Festival	Golden Nymph – Outstanding Actress in a Comedy Series	Love Soup	Nominated
2010	British Independent Film Awards	Best Supporting Actress	Tamara Drewe	Nominated
2011	Olivier Awards	Best Actress	The Little Dog Laughed	Nominated
2011	WhatsOnStage Awards	Best Supporting Actress	The Little Dog Laughed	Won
2011	British Comedy Awards	Best TV Comedy Actress	Friday Night Dinner	Nominated
2012	British Academy Television Awards	Best Female Comedy Performance	Friday Night Dinner	Nominated
2015	British Academy Television Awards	Best Female Comedy Performance	Episodes	Nominated
2015	Olivier Awards	Best Actress in a Musical	Women on the Verge of a Nervous Breakdown	Nominated
