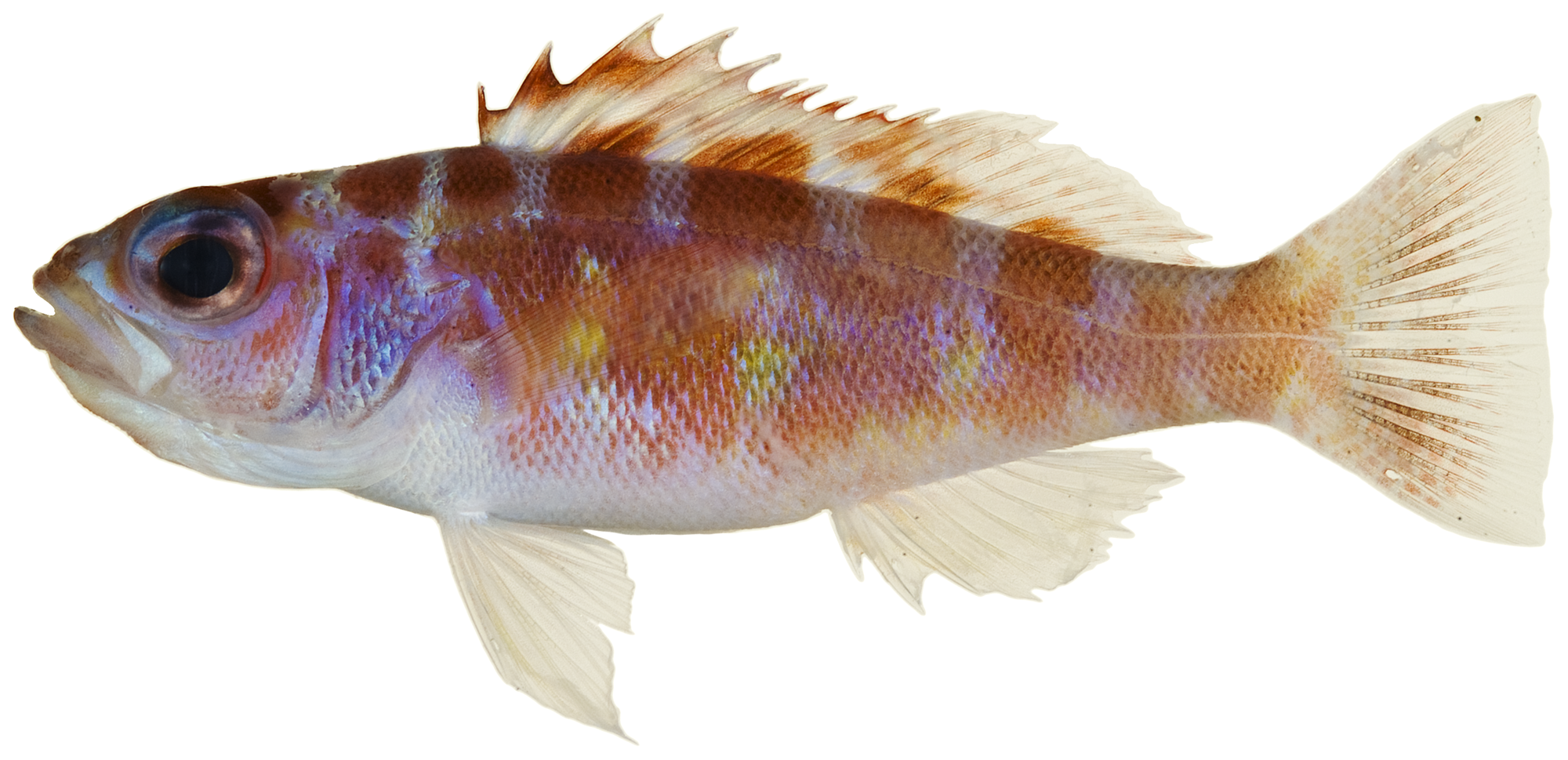

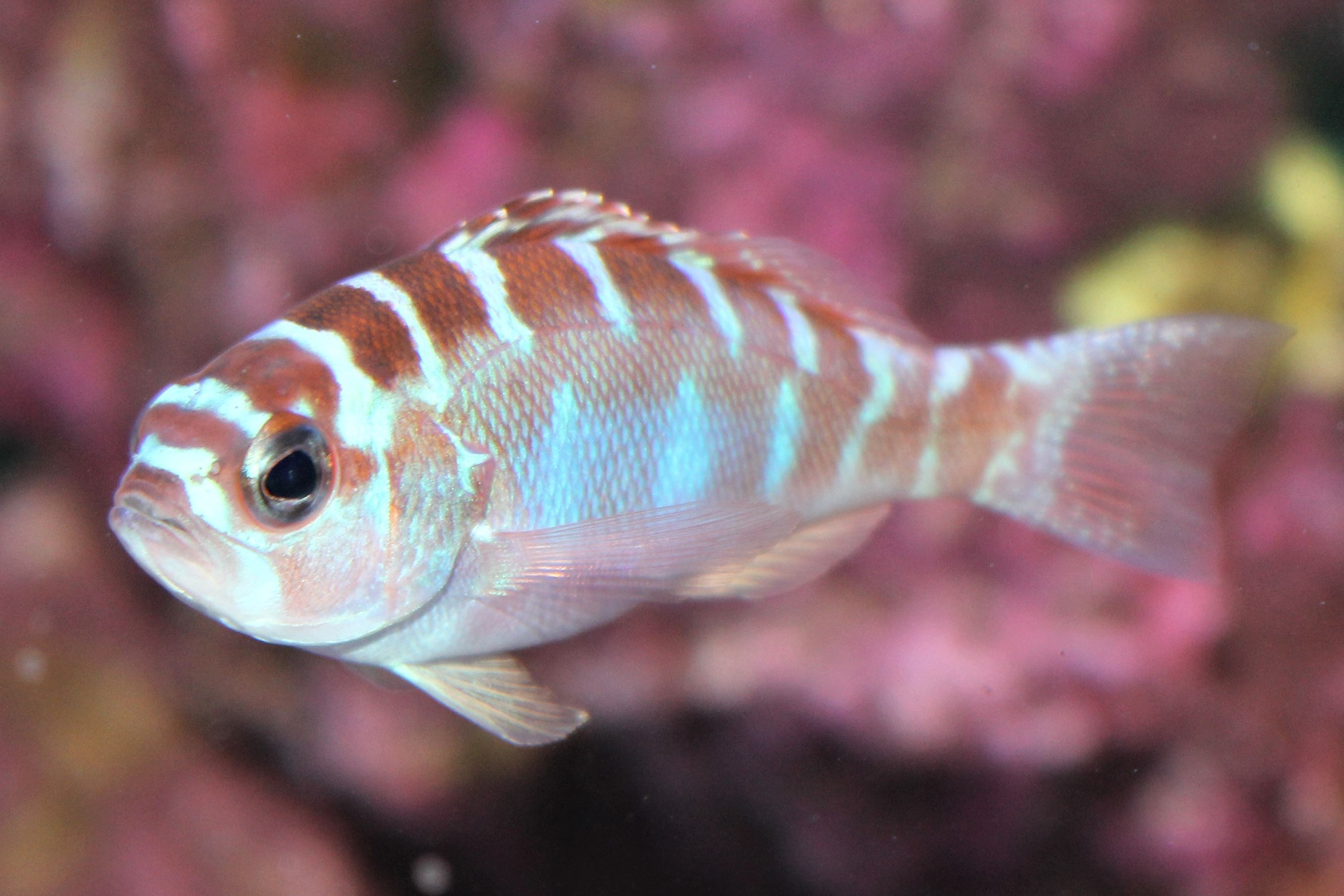

Conservation status
- Least Concern (IUCN 3.1)

Scientific classification
- Kingdom: Animalia
- Phylum: Chordata
- Class: Actinopterygii
- Order: Perciformes
- Family: Serranidae
- Genus: Serranus
- Species: S. tortugarum

Binomial name
- Serranus tortugarum Longley, 1935

= Serranus tortugarum =

Species of fish

Serranus tortugarum, the chalk bass, is a species of marine ray-finned fish, a sea bass from the subfamily Serraninae, classified as part of the family Serranidae which includes the groupers and anthias. It is found in the western Atlantic Ocean. This species is found in the aquarium trade.

== Description ==
Serranus tortugarum has a laterally compressed elongate body with a pointed snout which is shorter than the diameter of the eye. It has 3 clearly visible spines on the gill cover, the middle spine being straight. The margins of the preopercle are regularly serrated but there are no spines at its angle. The dorsal fin has 10 spines and 12 soft rays while the anal fin contains 3 spines and 7 soft rays. The caudal fin is truncate. This species shows a variable coloration and patterning and can change the colour and pattern on its body in relation to its environment as a means of camouflage. The typical colour is that the head and body are pale blue-grey, to pinkish brown with 8 narrow, vertical blue-grey bars on the upper body, the most forward just to the rear of the eye and the last one on the base of the caudal fin. Where they are underneath the dorsal fin they extend onto it. There is a row of 2-3 pale blotches on the flanks and the colour of the fins varies from transparent to pinkish. The chalk bass attains a maximum total length of 8.0 centimetres (3.1 in).

== Distribution ==
Serranus tortugarum is a species of the western Atlantic Ocean where it occurs from the Bahamas and southern Florida, throughout the Caribbean and along the mainland coast from southern Mexico to Venezuela.

== Habitat and biology ==
Serranus tortugarum is found over substrates of rock, silt or sand at depths of 2 to 400 metres (6.6 to 1,312.3 ft), although it is normally found at depths of less than 90 metres (300 ft). This is a social species that is normally recorded in loose aggregations which have a clear hierarchy. It is a simultaneous hermaphrodite, meaning that each fish has both male and female reproductive organs at the same time. However, self-fertilisation has not been recorded. This species practices egg parceling, which means that long-term partners trade sex roles each time they spawn, maintaining an equity of resource allocation. Chalk bass feed on zooplankton, although larger fish have been recorded feeding on more sizeable crustaceans which they swallowed whole. They frequently hover over sandy or rubble areas of seabed and use a nearby conch shell for shelter.

== Taxonomy ==
Serranus tortugarum was first formally described in 1935 by the American biologist William H. Longley (1881-1937) with the type locality given as the Tortugas Islands in the Florida Keys.

== Utilisation ==
Serranus tortugarum occurs in the aquarium trade.
