= Ancient biography =

Genre of Greek and Roman literature

Ancient biography, bios or bioi (plural), as distinct from modern biography, was a genre of Greek and Roman literature interested in describing the goals, achievements, failures, and character of ancient historical persons and whether or not they should be imitated.

== History ==
The earliest pioneers of ancient biography are found in the 4th century BC, amongst Greek works such as Xenophon's Agesilaus and Memoirs of Socrates, Isocrates' Evagoras, and Aristoxenus' publications. During the 1st century BC to 2nd Century AD, Cornelius Nepos' De Viris Illustribus, Plutarch's Parallel Lives, Suetonius' De Vita Caesarum, Lucian's Demonax and Peregrinus, and Tacitus' Agricola were examples of this development. Also in late antiquity, the Gospel narratives, Philostratus' Lives of the Sophists and Life of Apollonius of Tyana, Porphyry's Life of Pythagoras and Life of Plotinus, and Diogenes Laërtius' Lives and Opinions of Eminent Philosophers.

== Subgenres and characteristics ==
Authors of ancient bios, such as the works of Nepos and Plutarch imitated many of the same sources and techniques of the contemporary historiographies of ancient Greece, notably including the works of Herodotus and Thucydides. There were various forms of ancient biographies, including:

1. philosophical biographies that brought out the moral character of their subject (such as Diogenes Laertius's Lives of Eminent Philosophers);
2. literary biographies which discussed the lives of orators and poets (such as Philostratus's Lives of the Sophists);
3. school and reference biographies that offered a short sketch of someone including their ancestry, major events and accomplishments, and death;
4. autobiographies, commentaries and memoirs where the subject presents his own life;
5. historical/political biography focusing on the lives of those active in the military, among other categories.

Most scholars agree ancient biographies were subject to varying degrees of fictionalization. Mike Licona describes writing bios as comparable to editing a photograph, as ancient biographers did not hold to modern standards, and Coen de Temmerman compares them to paintings and sculptures; devices include flattery, idealization, inaccuracy, and distortion. While Plutarch did not completely fabricate material in his biographies, he did utilize imaginative literary techniques to reconstruct the truth as he saw fit. Christopher Jones finds this the case with Appollonius of Tyana and the Alexander Romance, though Ewen Bowie classifies it as only as a novel. Thucydides writes:

With reference to the speeches in this history, some were delivered before the war began, others while it was going on; some I heard myself, others I got from various quarters; it was in all cases difficult to carry them word for word in one's memory, so my habit has been to make the speakers say what was in my opinion demanded of them by the various occasions, of course adhering as closely as possible to the general sense of what they really said.

Another characteristic is that this genre of biography was often written to praise and laud an individual, with stories being selected and edited to present a particular view of a person. Authors in this genre did not always internally name themselves. These authors also tended to reference being personally present when discussing subjects in their own lifetime, and their direct relation to the events with first person statements, such as Cornelius Nepos in discussing a speech:

I myself heard him proudly assert, and with truth, at the funeral of his mother, whom he buried at the age of ninety, that "he had never had occasion to be reconciled to his mother," and that "he had never been at all at variance with his sister," who was nearly of the same age with himself; a proof that either no cause of complaint had happened between them, or that he was a person of such kind feelings towards his relatives, as to think it an impiety to be offended with those whom he ought to love.

Most preserved bios named their literary sources such as letters, previous authors, and books, but other biographies like Tacitus's Agricola, the Gospel of John, and Lucian's Life of Peregrinus did not cite written sources, as the authors themselves were the source of information given.

== Gospels as bios ==
The consensus among modern scholars is that the gospels are a subset of this ancient genre. Andrew Byers disputes the majority view, arguing that the author of Mark viewed himself as an author of scripture rather than a biographer or historian. Mitchell Reddish believes that caution should be given to identifying the gospels with biographies, describing them rather as "theologically interpreted history" given that modern biographies are different to ancient biographies. The four Gospel writers each interpreted the biography of Jesus differently. While the gospels share this genre, they are written for a wider audience and more closely resemble Jewish narratives about prophetic figures. The choice to assign the gospels as biography often involves a judgment about their historicity, with scholars who reject biography as the appropriate genre tending to overemphasize legendary elements in the gospels. Mitchell G. Reddish believes that caution should be given to identifying the gospels with biographies, as modern biographies are different to ancient biographies. For Reddish, they are best described as "theologically interpreted history", with the four Gospel writers each interpreting the biography of Jesus differently. Craig S. Keener wrote that ancient biographies that were typically written shortly after the subject's life, normally included substantial historical material.

Contemporary scholars are also in agreement that the Gospel of John was written in the genre of Greco-Roman biography. John contains many characteristics of those writings belonging to the genre of Greco-Roman biography, a) internally; including establishing the origins and ancestry of the figure (John 1:1), a focus on the main subjects great words and deeds, a focus on the death of the subject and the subsequent consequences, b) externally; promotion of a particular hero (where non-biographical writings focus on the events surrounding the characters rather than the character himself), the domination of the use of verbs by the subject (in John, 55% of verbs are taken up by Jesus' deeds), the prominence of the final portion of the subject's life (one third of John's Gospel is taken up by the last week of Jesus' life, comparable to 26% of Tacitus's Agricola and 37% of Xenophon's Agesilaus), the reference to the main subject in the beginning of the text, etc.

== Sources ==
- Burridge, Richard (2004), What are the Gospels?, Cambridge University Press
- Dunn, James D.G. (2005), "The Tradition", in Dunn, James D.G.; McKnight, Scot (eds.), The Historical Jesus in Recent Research, Eisenbrauns, ISBN 9781575061009
- Kostenberger, Andreas (2012), "The Genre of the Fourth Gospel and Greco-Roman Literary Conventions", in Porter, Stanley E.; Andrew W. Pitts (eds.), Christian Origins and Greco-Roman Culture: Social and Literary Contexts for the New Testament, vol. 1, Brill
- Lincoln, Andrew (2004), "Reading John", in Porter, Stanley E. (ed.), Reading the Gospels Today, Eerdmans, ISBN 9780802805171
- Lincoln, Andrew (2007), ""We Know That His Testimony Is True": Johannine Truth Claims and Historicity", in Anderson, Paul N.; Just, Felix; Thatcher, Tom (eds.), John, Jesus, and History, vol. 1
- Marincola, John, ed. (2010), A companion to Greek and Roman historiography (PDF), John Wiley & Sons
