= Euagoras plagiatus =

Scientific classification
- Kingdom: Animalia
- Phylum: Arthropoda
- Class: Insecta
- Order: Hemiptera
- Suborder: Heteroptera
- Family: Reduviidae
- Subfamily: Harpactorinae
- Tribe: Harpactorini
- Genus: Euagoras
- Species: E. plagiatus

Binomial name
- Euagoras plagiatus (Burmeister, 1834)

Synonyms
- ? plagiatus Burmeister, 1834

Species of true bug

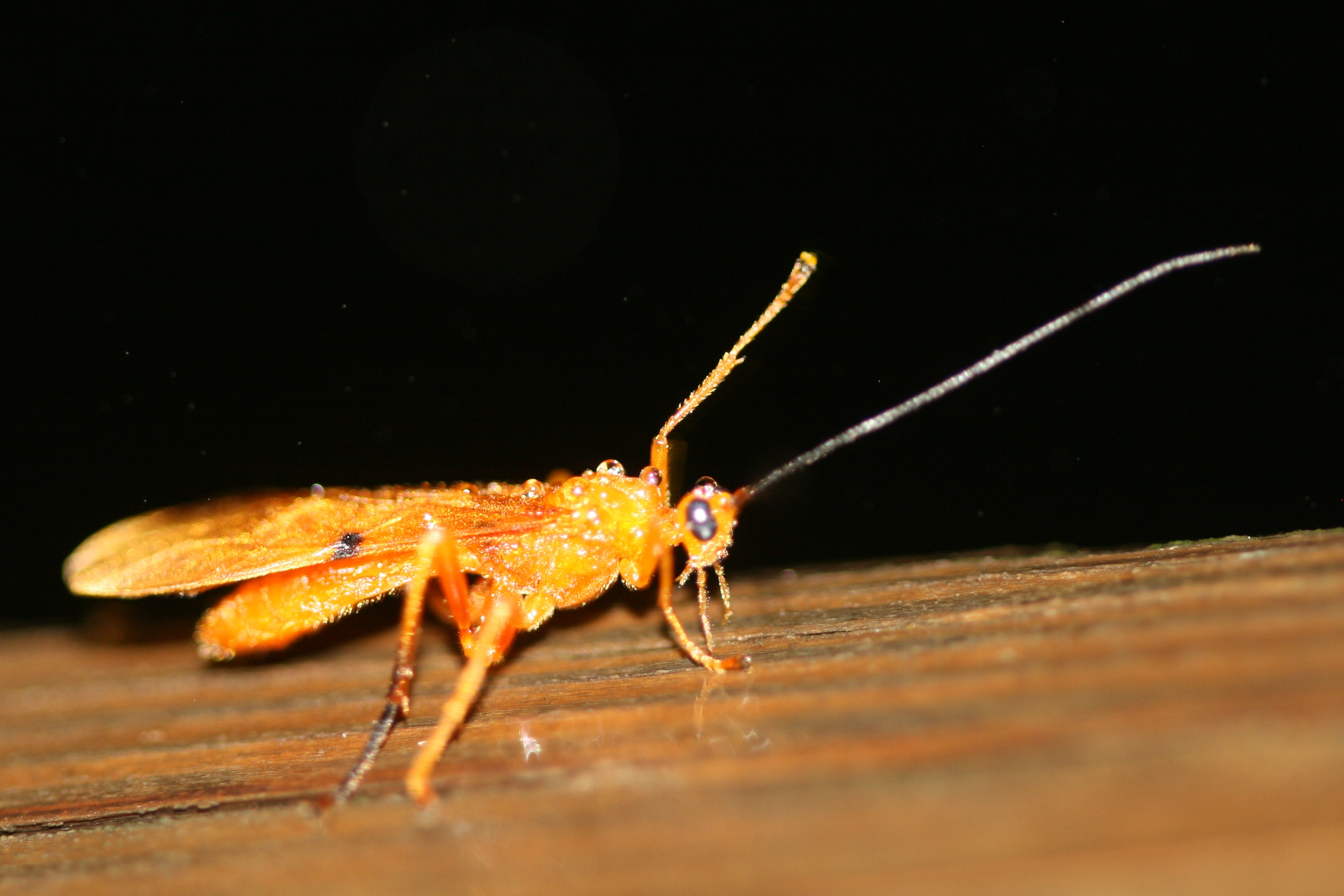
Euagoras plagiatus

Euagoras plagiatus is an Asian species of assassin bugs (insects in the family Reduviidae), in the subfamily Harpactorinae. It has been investigated as a potential biocontrol agent for Pterophorus lienigianus Z., which is a pest of eggplant (Solanum melongena).
