= Fitchia =

Fitchia is the scientific name of two genera of organisms and may refer to:

- Fitchia (bug), a genus of insects in the family Reduviidae
- Fitchia (plant), a genus of plants in the family Asteraceae
