= Harpactor angulosus =

Scientific classification
- Kingdom: Animalia
- Phylum: Arthropoda
- Class: Insecta
- Order: Hemiptera
- Suborder: Heteroptera
- Family: Reduviidae
- Subfamily: Harpactorinae
- Tribe: Harpactorini
- Genus: Harpactor
- Species: H. angulosus

Binomial name
- Harpactor angulosus Lepeletier & Serville, 1825

Species of true bug

Harpactor angulosus is a species of true bug (Harpactorinae). This assassin bug has been documented preying on caterpillars of the genus Hylesia (Lepidoptera: Saturniidae: Hemileucinae) in Viçosa, Minas Gerais State, Brazil. Caterpillars of this genus are an agricultural pest. H. angulosus, like other species of Harpactorini, has potential as a biological pest control agent.
