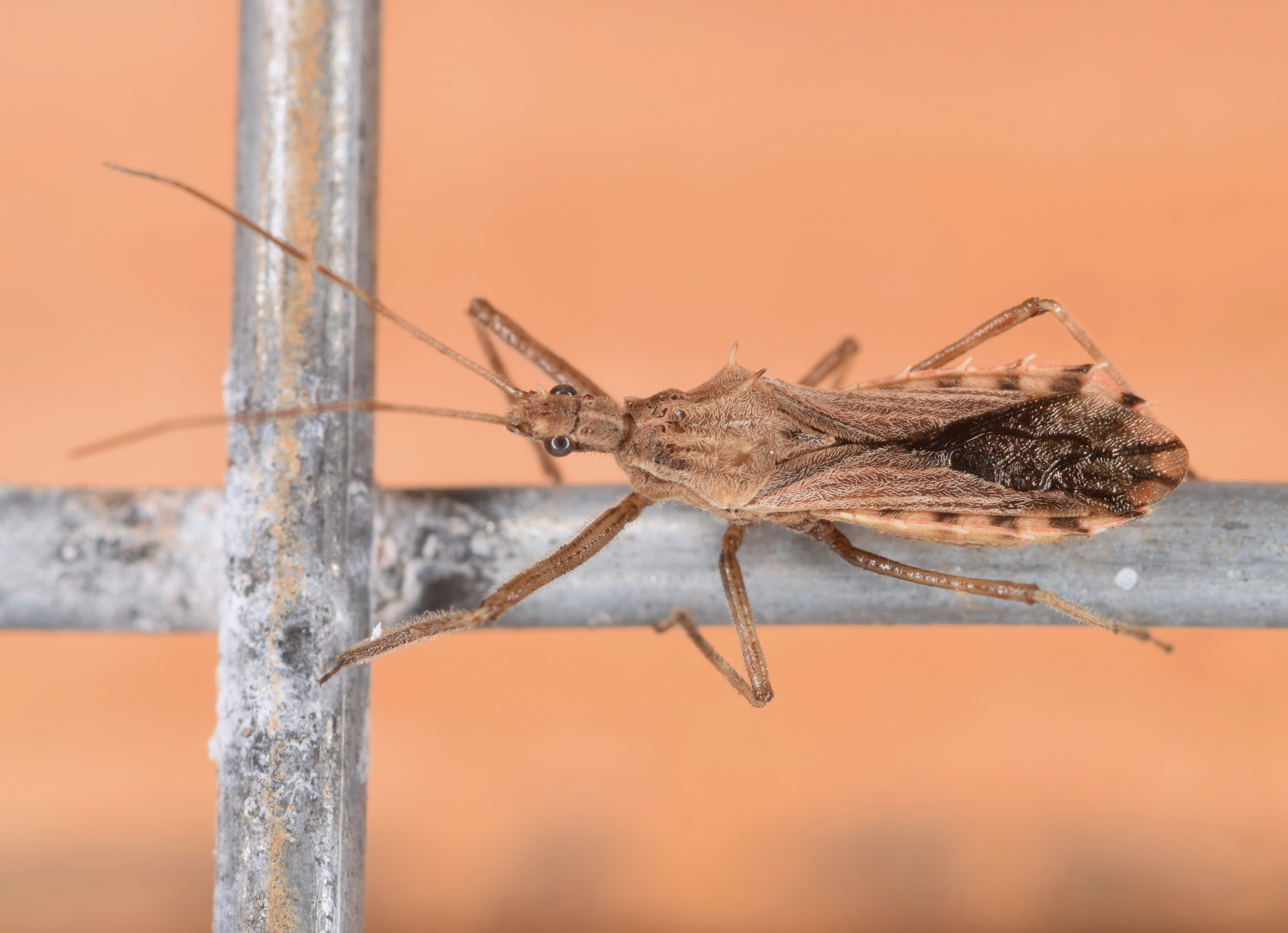

Scientific classification
- Kingdom: Animalia
- Phylum: Arthropoda
- Clade: Pancrustacea
- Class: Insecta
- Order: Hemiptera
- Suborder: Heteroptera
- Family: Reduviidae
- Subfamily: Harpactorinae
- Tribe: Harpactorini
- Genus: Atrachelus
- Species: A. cinereus

Binomial name
- Atrachelus cinereus (Fabricius, 1798)

Synonyms
- Atrachelus heterogeneus Amyot & Serville, 1843

= Atrachelus cinereus =

Species of true bugs

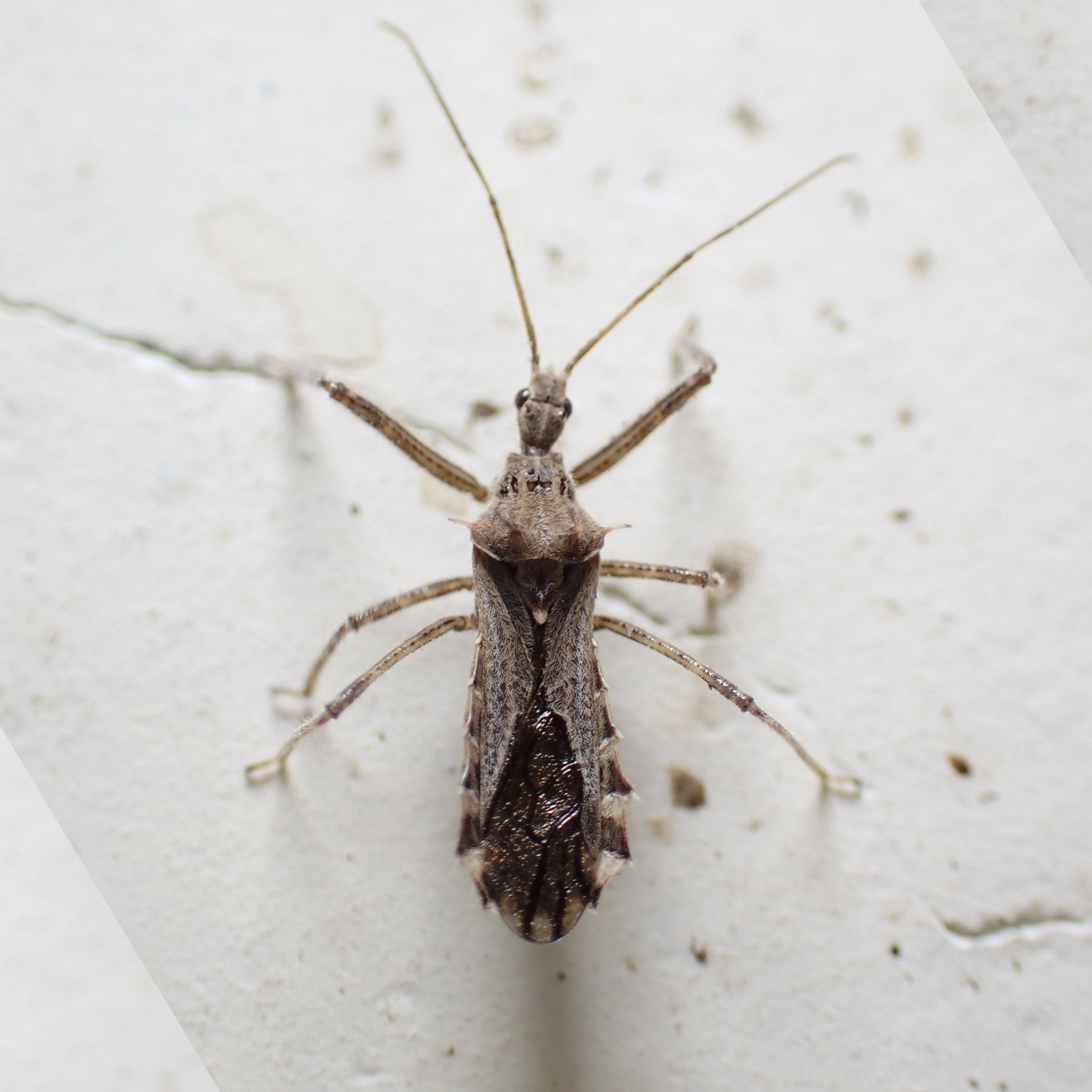
Atrachelus cinereus, Bolivia

Atrachelus cinereus is a species of assassin bug in the family Reduviidae, found in North, Central, and South America.

== Subspecies ==
These subspecies belong to the species Atrachelus cinereus:

- Atrachelus cinereus cinereus (Fabricius, 1798)
- Atrachelus cinereus wygodzinskyi Elkins, 1954
