= Beharus =

Scientific classification
- Kingdom: Animalia
- Phylum: Arthropoda
- Clade: Pancrustacea
- Class: Insecta
- Order: Hemiptera
- Suborder: Heteroptera
- Family: Reduviidae
- Subfamily: Harpactorinae
- Tribe: Apiomerini
- Genus: Beharus; Amyot & Serville, 1843
- Species: B. cylindripes

Binomial name
- Beharus cylindripes (Fabricius, 1803)

Genus of true bugs

Beharus is a monotypic genus of assassin bugs belonging to the family Reduviidae. Its one described species, B. cylindripes, is found in South America, though not restricted to the Amazon basin.

The species seems to be associated with Ponerobia bipustulata and Amauroclopius ornatus as all three were found on the same tree (Prioria copaifera).
