= Pahabengkakia =

Scientific classification
- Kingdom: Animalia
- Phylum: Arthropoda
- Clade: Pancrustacea
- Class: Insecta
- Order: Hemiptera
- Suborder: Heteroptera
- Family: Reduviidae
- Subfamily: Harpactorinae
- Tribe: Harpactorini
- Genus: Pahabengkakia; Miller, 1941
- Species: P. piliceps

Binomial name
- Pahabengkakia piliceps Miller, 1941

Genus of true bugs

Pahabengkakia piliceps is a species of true bug (Harpactorinae) found in Thailand. It is the only species in the genus Pahabengkakia. This species is apparently a specialist predator of the stingless bee Tetrigona sp. and Trigona collina. Larval P. piliceps mimic the bees, and eggs are laid in the bees' hives. Nymphs of P. piliceps were found to occupy the nest entrance and kill returning foraging bees. The assassin bug does not seem to predate other Trigona species (T. apicalis, T. fimbriata, T. nitidiventris, T. terminata, T. ventralis and T. itama), even though they are also present in the area.
