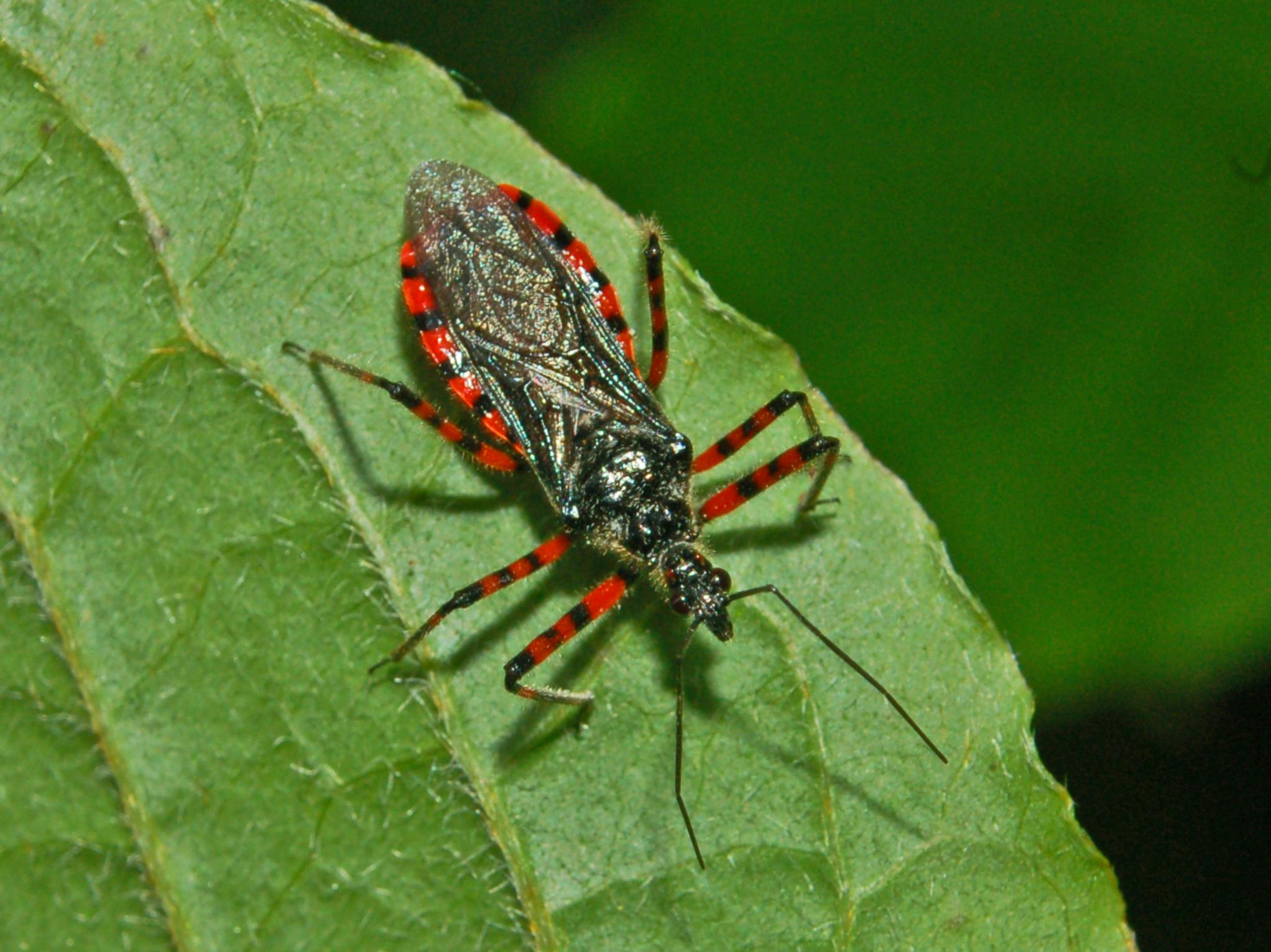
- Sphedanolestes cingulatus. Dorsal view
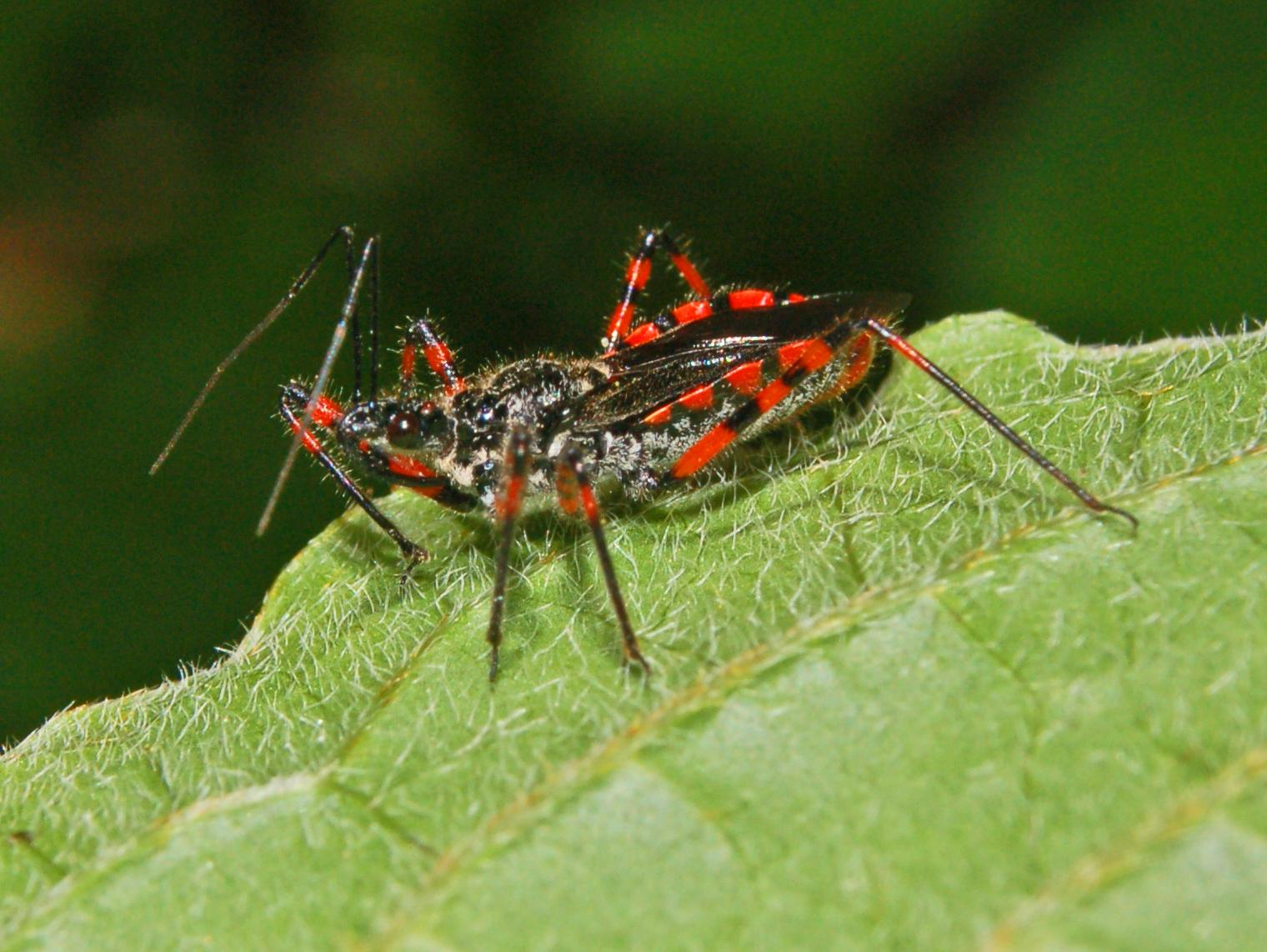
- Side view

Scientific classification
- Kingdom: Animalia
- Phylum: Arthropoda
- Clade: Pancrustacea
- Class: Insecta
- Order: Hemiptera
- Suborder: Heteroptera
- Family: Reduviidae
- Genus: Sphedanolestes
- Species: S. cingulatus

Binomial name
- Sphedanolestes cingulatus (Fieber, 1864)

= Sphedanolestes cingulatus =

Species of true bug

Sphedanolestes cingulatus is a species of assassin bug belonging to the family Reduviidae, in the subfamily Harpactorinae.

== Etymology ==
The species name cingulatus is derived from Latin and means "girded", referring to the color pattern of the legs.

== Distribution ==
Sphedanolestes cingulatus is an endemic Italian species, present in Italian mainland and in Sicily. It is rare in northern Italy, more common in southern Italy and Sicily.

== Habitat ==
These bugs are predominantly found in herbaceous layers.

== Description ==
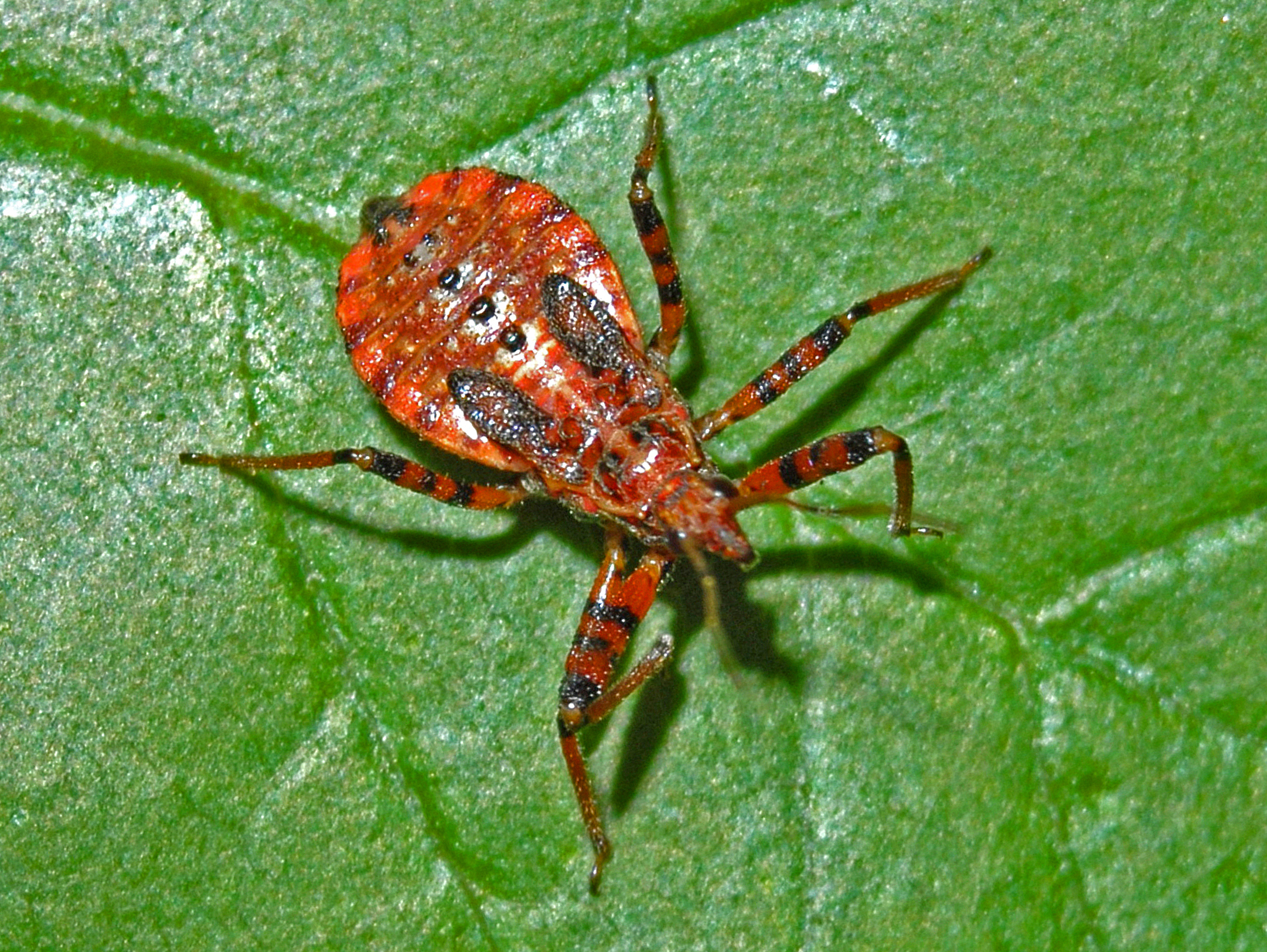
Nymph of S. cingulatus

Sphedanolestes cingulatus can reach a length of about 10–12 millimetres (0.39–0.47 in). These large and powerfully built bugs are almost completely black. The connexivum (the edge of the abdomen) is black with red stripes. Sphedanolestes cingulatus has strong femurs (thighs).

An easy distinctive character of S. cingulatus in respect of Rhynocoris species, Sphedanolestes annulatus and Sphedanolestes sanguineus is the femora with three red and three black rings.

== Biology ==
These assassin bugs are predators of other invertebrates that are waiting for the pass, usually on the leaves of the shrubs or on the flowers. They hunt at night.

== Bibliography ==
- Stichel W. 1959: Illustrierte Bestimmungstabellen der Wanzen. II. Europa (Hemiptera-Heteroptera Europae). 3. 6. Cimicomorpha, Reduviidae, Nabidae. W. Stichel, Berlin, pp. 81–206.
- Pitshkov P. V. & Moulet P. 2010: Hémiptères Reduviidae d’Europe occidentale. Faune de France et régions limitrophes. Vol. 92. Fédération Française des Sociétés de Sciences Naturelles, Paris, 668 pp. + 24 pls.
- Jenaro Maldonado Capriles (1990): Catalogue of the Reduviidae of the World - Caribbean Journal of Science, University of Puerto Rico
