= Agriocoris =

Scientific classification
- Kingdom: Animalia
- Phylum: Arthropoda
- Clade: Pancrustacea
- Class: Insecta
- Order: Hemiptera
- Suborder: Heteroptera
- Family: Reduviidae
- Subfamily: Harpactorinae
- Tribe: Apiomerini
- Genus: Agriocoris; Stål, 1866
- Species: A. flavipes

Binomial name
- Agriocoris flavipes Stål, 1866

Genus of true bugs

Agriocoris is a monotypic genus of assassin bugs (family Reduviidae), containing a single species, Agriocoris flavipes. It is widely distributed throughout Central and South America.
