= Amulius malayus =

Scientific classification
- Kingdom: Animalia
- Phylum: Arthropoda
- Class: Insecta
- Order: Hemiptera
- Suborder: Heteroptera
- Family: Reduviidae
- Genus: Amulius
- Species: A. malayus

Binomial name
- Amulius malayus Stål, 1866

Species of bug

Amulius malayus is a species of assassin bug in the family Reduviidae.
