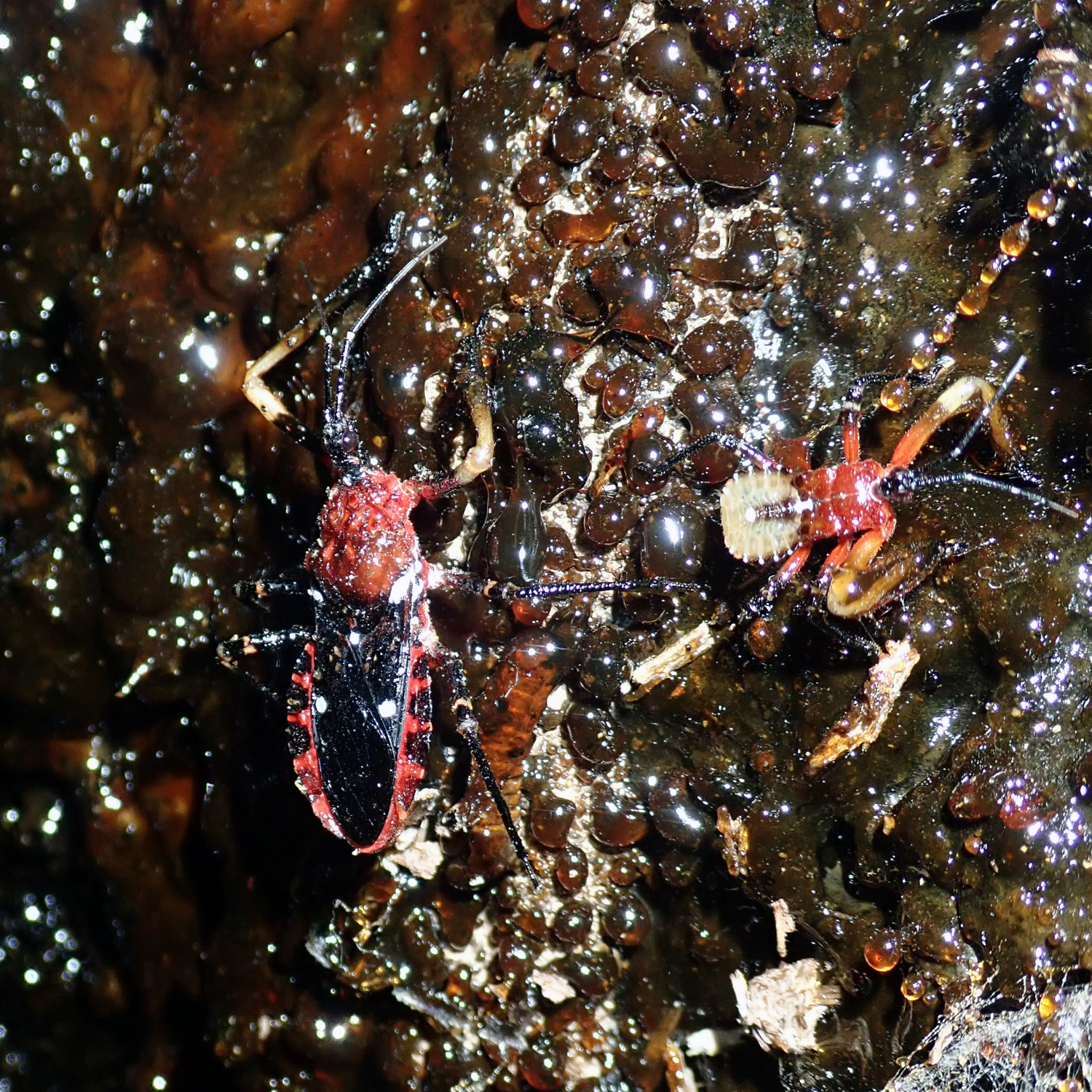
- Ectinoderus sp. on gum exuding from a Dipterocarpus tree wound: in Cat Tien National Park

Scientific classification
- Kingdom: Animalia
- Phylum: Arthropoda
- Class: Insecta
- Order: Hemiptera
- Suborder: Heteroptera
- Family: Reduviidae
- Subfamily: Harpactorinae
- Tribe: Ectinoderini
- Genus: Ectinoderus; Westwood, 1845

Synonyms
- Pristhevarma Amyot & Serville, 1843

= Ectinoderus =

Genus of true bugs

Ectinoderus is a genus of Asian bugs in the family Reduviidae. It is the type genus of the tribe Ectinoderini: the 'Oriental resin bugs' (although some authorities elevate this to a subfamily - Ectinoderinae).

== Determination ==
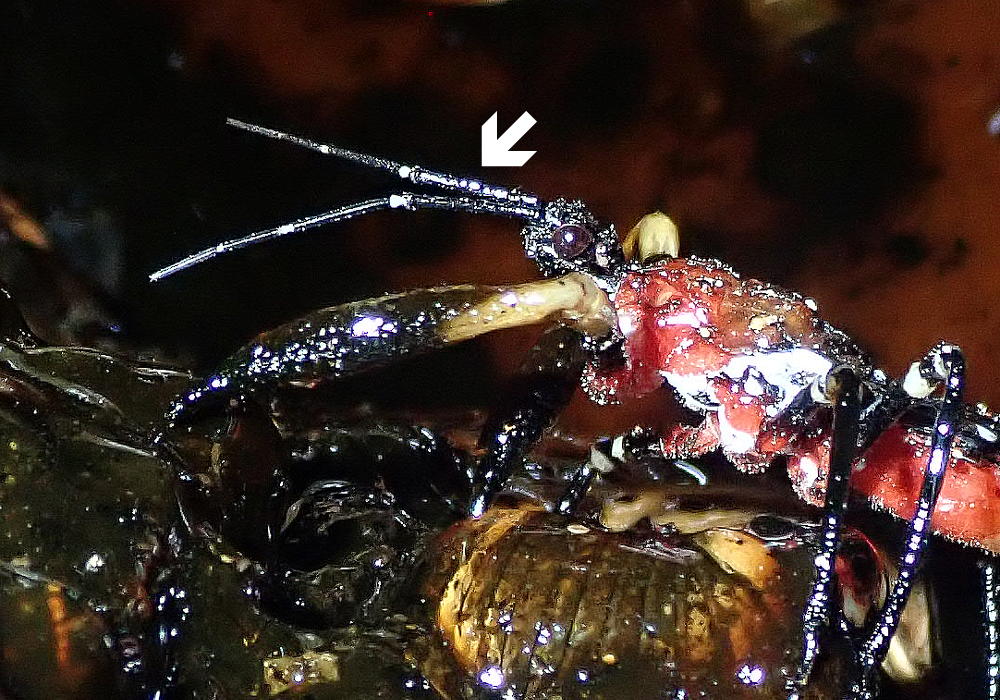
Lateral view of head: 1st antennal segment indicated

The two genera of Oriental resin bugs appear to be very similar to one another, but can be differentiated by careful examination of the head region. With Ectinoderus the first antennal segment is always distinctly longer than the head, but in Amulius this segment is much shorter (<50%) than the head length. Species in this genus require review.

== Species ==
The Global Biodiversity Information Facility lists:

1. Ectinoderus bipunctatus (Amyot & Serville 1843)
2. Ectinoderus caedens Miller 1958
3. Ectinoderus celebensis Miller 1954
4. Ectinoderus certator Miller 1958
5. Ectinoderus confragosus (Distant, 1919) (previously in Amulius)
6. Ectinoderus exortivus Distant 1903
7. Ectinoderus longimanus Westwood 1845
8. Ectinoderus nitidus Stål 1866
9. Ectinoderus philippinensis Westwood 1845
10. Ectinoderus ruppelli Breddin 1900
11. Ectinoderus surmpluosus Distant 1903
