= Amulius (insect) =

Scientific classification
- Kingdom: Animalia
- Phylum: Arthropoda
- Clade: Pancrustacea
- Class: Insecta
- Order: Hemiptera
- Suborder: Heteroptera
- Family: Reduviidae
- Subfamily: Harpactorinae
- Tribe: Ectinoderini
- Genus: Amulius; Stål, 1866

Synonyms
- Parapanthous Distant, 1919

Genus of true bugs

External image
- Images at iNaturalist

Amulius is a genus of Asian bugs in the family Reduviidae. It has been placed in the tribe Ectinoderini: the 'Oriental resin bugs' (although some authorities elevate this to the subfamily Ectinoderinae).

== Determination ==
The two genera of Oriental resin bugs appear to be very similar but can be differentiated by careful examination of the head region. With Amulius the first antennal segment is much shorter (<50%) than the head length, but in Ectinoderus this segment is always distinctly longer than the head. Species in this genus require review.

== Species ==
The Global Biodiversity Information Facility lists:

1. Amulius armillatus Breddin, 1900
2. Amulius bipustulatus Bergroth, 1913
3. Amulius immaculatus Miller, 1955
4. Amulius longiceps Stål, 1866
5. Amulius malayus Stål, 1866
6. Amulius quadripunctatus (Stål, 1859)
7. Amulius rubrifemur Breddin, 1895 - India
8. Amulius spinicollis (Distant, 1919) - Vietnam
9. Amulius sumatranus Roepke, 1932
10. Amulius viscus Distant, 1911
