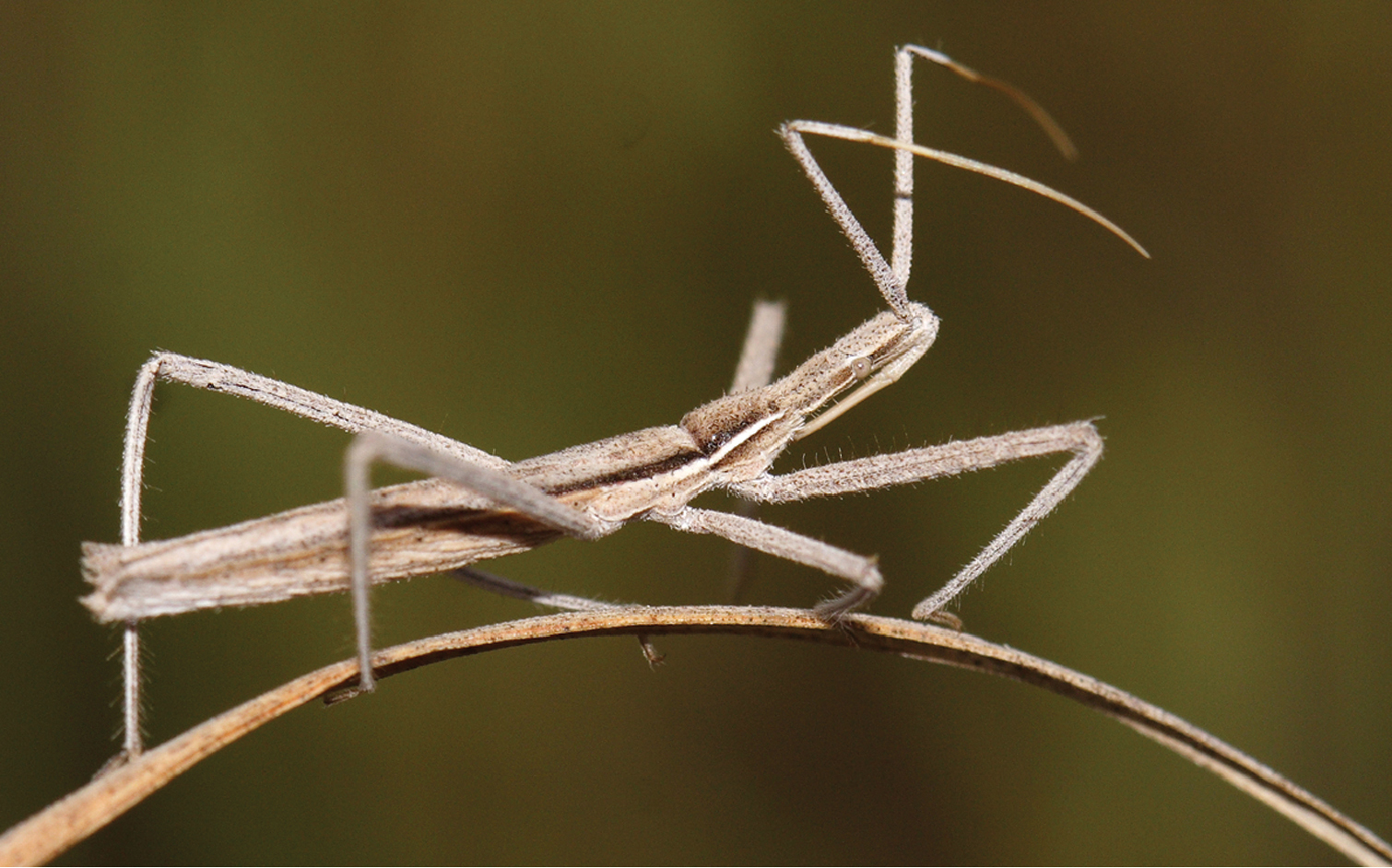
- Vibertiola cinerea

Scientific classification
- Domain: Eukaryota
- Kingdom: Animalia
- Phylum: Arthropoda
- Class: Insecta
- Order: Hemiptera
- Suborder: Heteroptera
- Family: Reduviidae
- Subfamily: Harpactorinae
- Tribe: Rhaphidosomatini
- Genus: Vibertiola; Horváth, 1909

Synonyms
- Vibertia Horváth, 1907

= Vibertiola =

Genus of true bugs

Vibertiola is a genus of assassin bugs in the tribe Rhaphidosomatini. Species have been recorded from southern Europe and North-West Africa.

== Species ==
BioLib lists the following:

- Vibertiola argentata Bergroth, 1922
- Vibertiola cinerea (Horváth, 1907) – type species
- Vibertiola ribauti Bergroth, 1922
