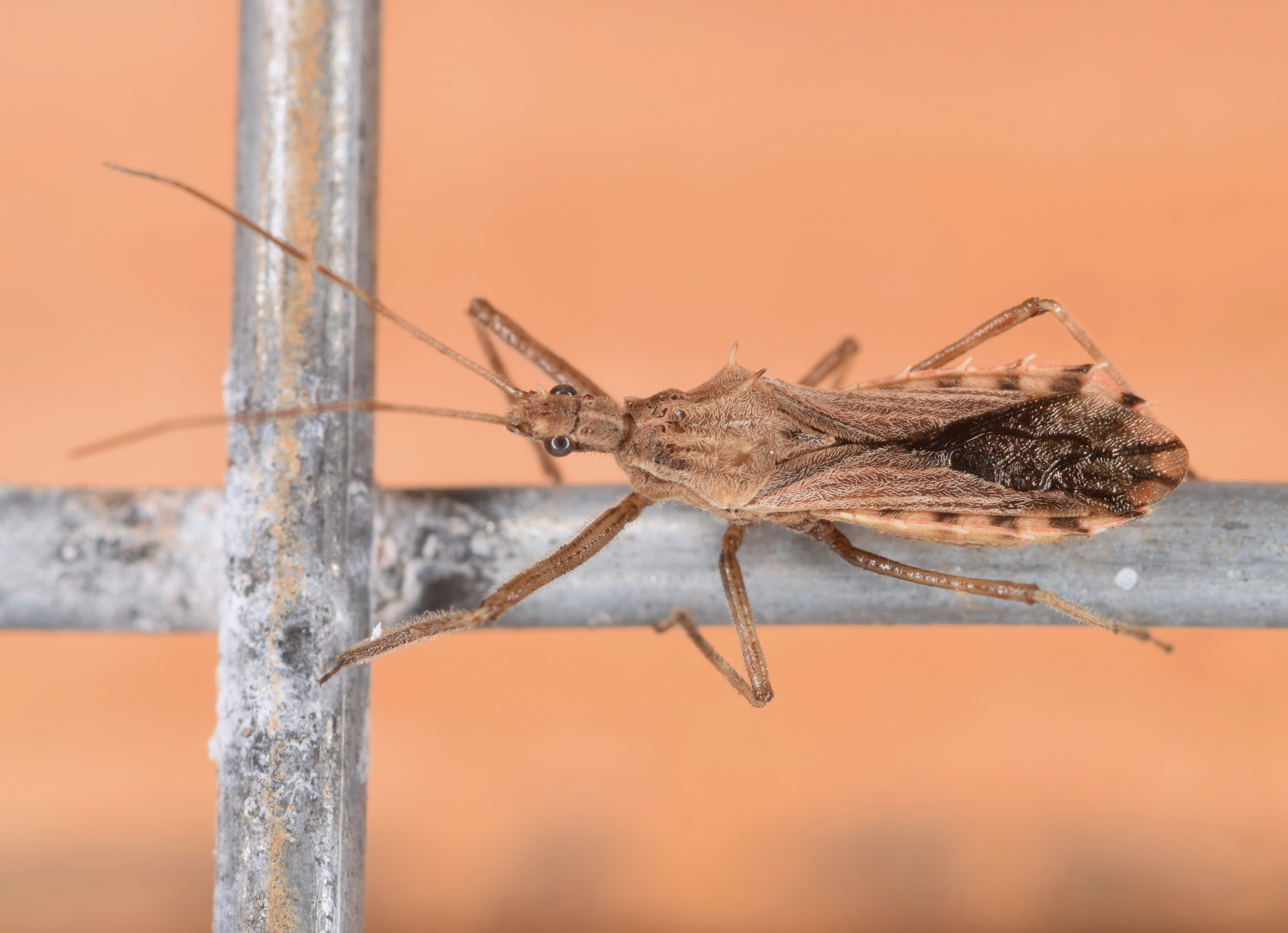
- Atrachelus cinereus

Scientific classification
- Domain: Eukaryota
- Kingdom: Animalia
- Phylum: Arthropoda
- Class: Insecta
- Order: Hemiptera
- Suborder: Heteroptera
- Family: Reduviidae
- Subfamily: Harpactorinae
- Genus: Atrachelus; Amyot & Serville, 1843

= Atrachelus =

Genus of true bugs

Atrachelus is a genus of assassin bugs in the family Reduviidae, found in the Americas. There are at least two described species in Atrachelus.

== Species ==
- Atrachelus cinereus (Fabricius, 1798)
- Atrachelus mucosus (Champion, 1899)
