= Fitchia spinosula =

Scientific classification
- Kingdom: Animalia
- Phylum: Arthropoda
- Clade: Pancrustacea
- Class: Insecta
- Order: Hemiptera
- Suborder: Heteroptera
- Family: Reduviidae
- Genus: Fitchia
- Species: F. spinosula

Binomial name
- Fitchia spinosula Stål, 1872

Species of true bug

Fitchia spinosula is a species of assassin bug in the family Reduviidae. It is found in North America.
