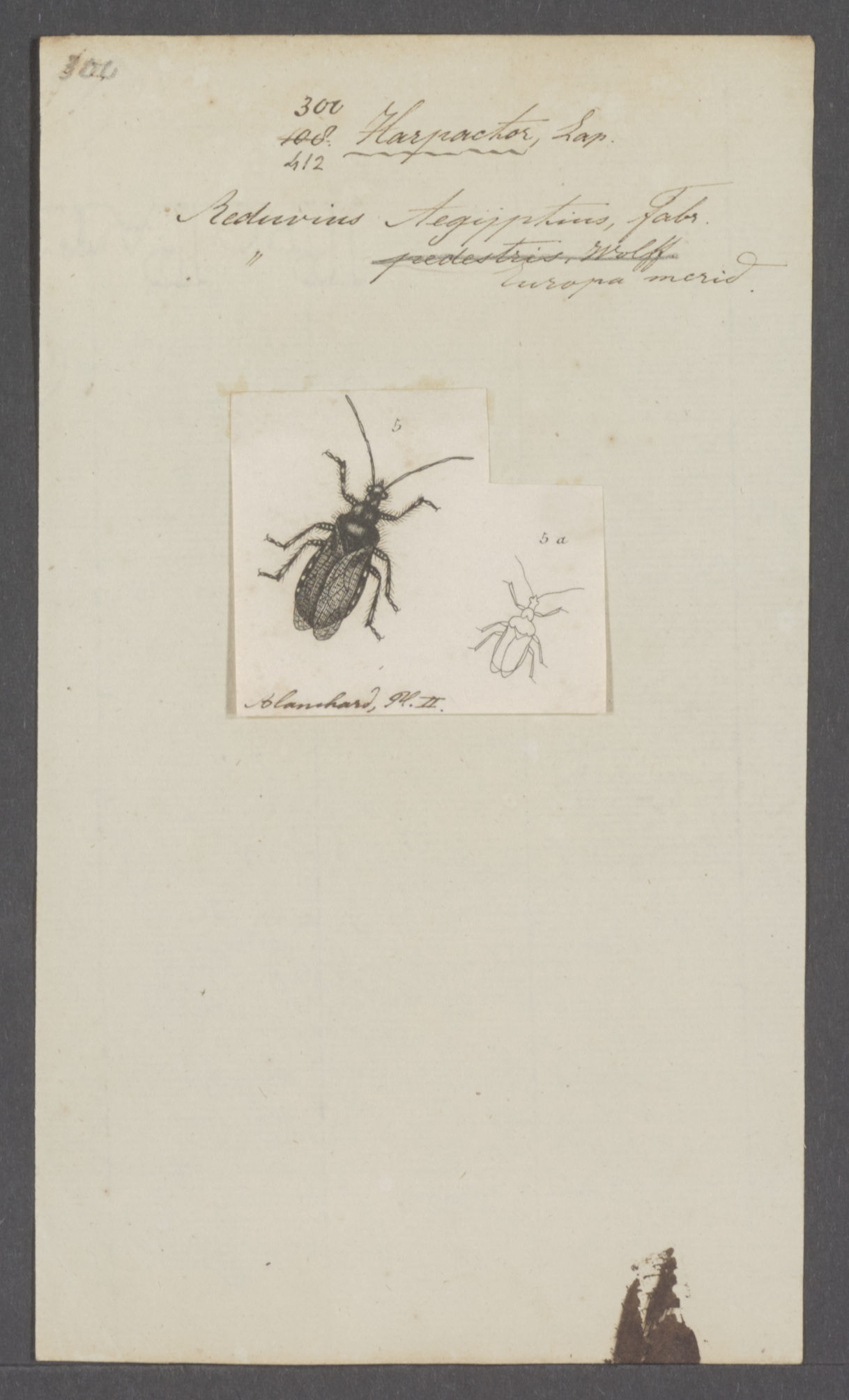

Scientific classification
- Domain: Eukaryota
- Kingdom: Animalia
- Phylum: Arthropoda
- Class: Insecta
- Order: Hemiptera
- Suborder: Heteroptera
- Family: Reduviidae
- Subfamily: Harpactorinae
- Tribe: Harpactorini
- Genus: Harpactor; Laporte, 1833

Species
- See Text

= Harpactor =

Genus of true bugs

Harpactor is a genus of assassin bug family (Reduviidae), in the subfamily Harpactorinae.

Some species have been investigated for their potential as biological pest control agents in integrated pest management.

== Species ==
The Global Biodiversity Information Facility lists:

- Harpactor angulosus (Lepeletier & Serville, 1825)
- Harpactor bisagittatus Pennington
- † Harpactor bruckmanni Heer, 1853
- † Harpactor chomeraciensis Riou, 1999
- † Harpactor constrictus Heer, 1853
- Harpactor distinguendus (Stål, 1859)
- † Harpactor gracilis Heer, 1853
- Harpactor incertus (Distant, 1903)
- † Harpactor longipes Heer, 1853
- † Harpactor maculipes Heer, 1853
- † Harpactor obsoletus Heer, 1853
- Harpactor ornatus Uhler
- Harpactor rhombeus (Erichson, 1848)
- Harpactor shevroyensis Hegde, 1989
- Harpactor tuberculosus Stål, 1872
