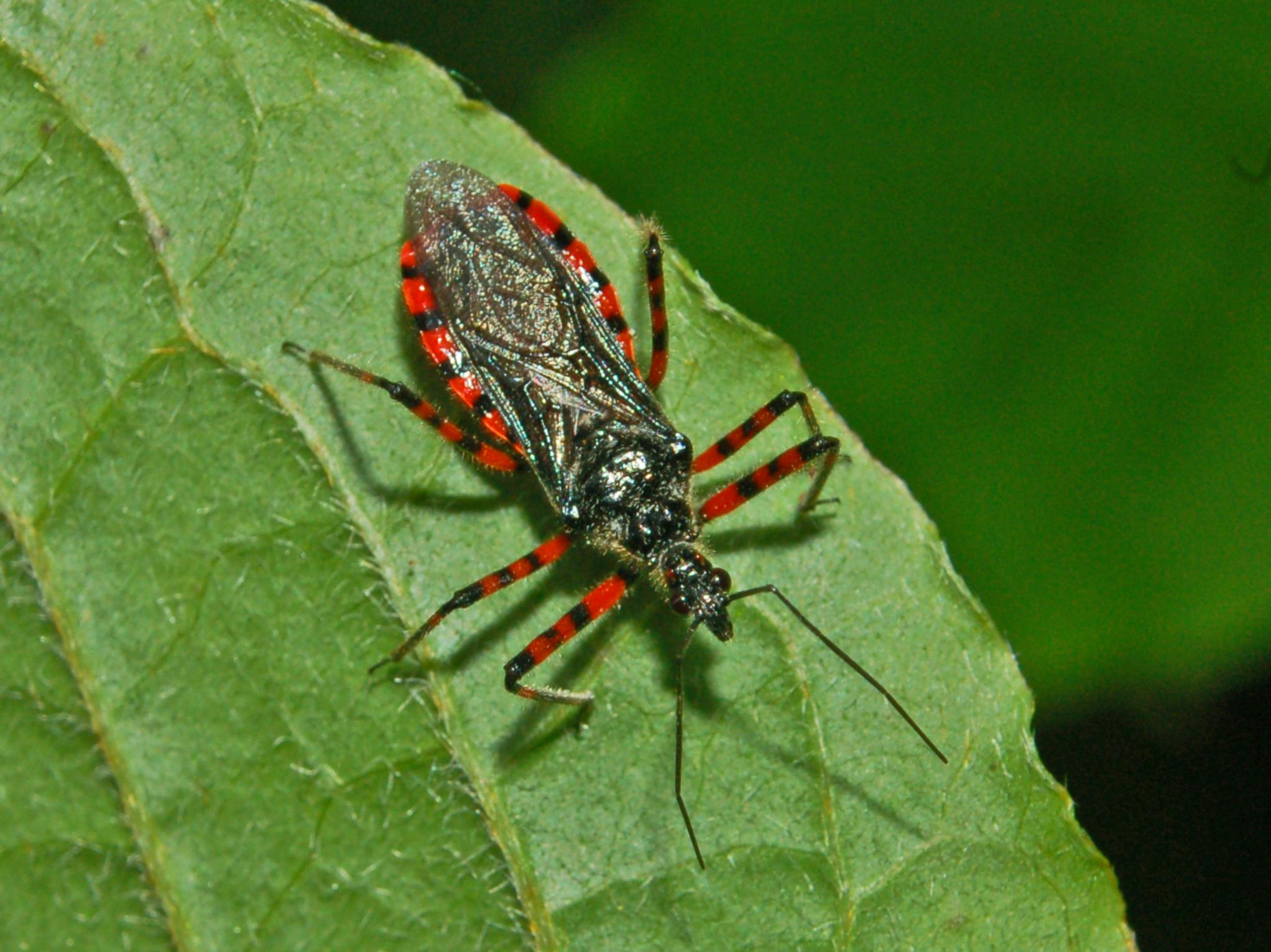
- Sphedanolestes cingulatus

Scientific classification
- Domain: Eukaryota
- Kingdom: Animalia
- Phylum: Arthropoda
- Class: Insecta
- Order: Hemiptera
- Suborder: Heteroptera
- Family: Reduviidae
- Subfamily: Harpactorinae
- Tribe: Harpactorini
- Genus: Sphedanolestes; Stal, 1866

Species
- See text

Synonyms
- Graptosphodrus Stål, 1866; Haemactus Stål, 1874; Lissonyctes Stål, 1871; Sphactes Stål, 1870; Sphydrinus Stål, 1874

= Sphedanolestes =

Genus of true bugs

Sphedanolestes is a large genus of assassin bugs in the family (Reduviidae), subfamily Harpactorinae. There are more than 190 described species, which are found in southern Europe, Africa and Asia.

== Species ==
BioLib lists the following:

- Sphedanolestes achteni Schouteden, 1932
- Sphedanolestes aequatorialis Schouteden, 1932
- Sphedanolestes alacer Miller, 1958
- Sphedanolestes albigula Breddin, 1905
- Sphedanolestes albipilosus Ishikawa, Cai & Tomokuni, 2007
- Sphedanolestes alboniger Villiers, 1969
- Sphedanolestes anabib Miller, 1956
- Sphedanolestes anellus Hsiao, 1979
- Sphedanolestes angolensis Villiers, 1952
- Sphedanolestes angularis Reuter, 1887
- Sphedanolestes annulatus Linnavuori, 1961
- Sphedanolestes annulicollis Villiers, 1948
- Sphedanolestes annulipes Distant, 1903
- Sphedanolestes arciferus Villiers, 1975
- Sphedanolestes argenteolineatus (A. Costa, 1883)
- Sphedanolestes aruanus Miller, 1958
- Sphedanolestes aurescens Distant, 1919
- Sphedanolestes aureus Moulet, 2001
- Sphedanolestes avidus Miller, 1941
- Sphedanolestes badgleyi Distant, 1909
- Sphedanolestes bastardi Villiers, 1969
- Sphedanolestes bekiliensis Villiers, 1960
- Sphedanolestes bellus Stål, 1874
- Sphedanolestes bicolor Schouteden, 1910
- Sphedanolestes bicoloripes (Distant, 1881)
- Sphedanolestes bicoloroides P. V. Putshkov, 1987
- Sphedanolestes bicolorous Livingstone & Ravichandran, 1990
- Sphedanolestes bimaculatus Miller, 1953
- Sphedanolestes bituberculatus (Jakovlev, 1893)
- Sphedanolestes bizonatus Villiers, 1969
- Sphedanolestes bowringi Distant, 1909
- Sphedanolestes bredoi Schouteden, 1952
- Sphedanolestes burgeoni Schouteden, 1932
- Sphedanolestes cachani Villiers, 1959
- Sphedanolestes callani Villiers, 1960
- Sphedanolestes cameronicus Miller, 1941
- Sphedanolestes cheesmanae Miller, 1958
- Sphedanolestes cincticeps Miller, 1950
- Sphedanolestes cingulatus (Fieber, 1864)
- Sphedanolestes citrinus Miller, 1958
- Sphedanolestes collarti Schouteden, 1932
- Sphedanolestes compressipes Stål, 1874
- Sphedanolestes conspicuus Miller, 1958
- Sphedanolestes corallinus Distant, 1904
- Sphedanolestes dekeyseri Villiers, 1948
- Sphedanolestes delattrei Villiers, 1948
- Sphedanolestes discifer Reuter, 1881
- Sphedanolestes discopygus Miller, 1954
- Sphedanolestes distinctus Schouteden, 1932
- Sphedanolestes dives Distant, 1904
- Sphedanolestes dorchymonti Dispons, 1968
- Sphedanolestes dromedarius Reuter, 1881
- Sphedanolestes dumbicus Schouteden, 1932
- Sphedanolestes elegans Distant, 1903
- Sphedanolestes exilis Miller, 1958
- Sphedanolestes fallax Miller, 1941
- Sphedanolestes fasciativentris (Stål, 1855)
- Sphedanolestes femoralis Distant, 1919
- Sphedanolestes fenestratus Linnavuori, 1969
- Sphedanolestes festus Miller, 1958
- Sphedanolestes flaviventris Distant, 1919
- Sphedanolestes fraterculus Bergroth, 1908
- Sphedanolestes freyi Villiers, 1970
- Sphedanolestes funeralis Distant, 1903
- Sphedanolestes gestuosus (Stål, 1861)
- Sphedanolestes ghesquierei Schouteden, 1932
- Sphedanolestes granulipes Hsiao & Ren, 1981
- Sphedanolestes guerze Villiers, 1948
- Sphedanolestes gularis Hsiao, 1979
- Sphedanolestes gulo (Stål, 1863)
- Sphedanolestes haematopterus (Germar, 1837)
- Sphedanolestes hemiochrus (Stål, 1870)
- Sphedanolestes hendrickxi Schouteden, 1952
- Sphedanolestes himalayensis Distant, 1909
- Sphedanolestes hirtipes Villiers, 1948
- Sphedanolestes histrio Miller, 1958
- Sphedanolestes holasi Villiers, 1950
- Sphedanolestes horvathi Lindberg, 1932
- Sphedanolestes impressicollis (Stål, 1861)
- Sphedanolestes incertus Distant, 1903
- Sphedanolestes indicus Reuter, 1881
- Sphedanolestes insignis Miller, 1950
- Sphedanolestes insulanus Miller, 1941
- Sphedanolestes ivohibensis Villiers, 1969
- Sphedanolestes janssensi Villiers, 1954
- Sphedanolestes jucundus (Stål, 1866)
- Sphedanolestes karschi Schouteden, 1932
- Sphedanolestes kasaicus Schouteden, 1932
- Sphedanolestes katangae Schouteden, 1932
- Sphedanolestes keiseri Villiers, 1969
- Sphedanolestes kerandeli Villiers, 1948
- Sphedanolestes kolleri Schouteden, 1911
- Sphedanolestes lamottei Villiers, 1948
- Sphedanolestes lativentris Villiers, 1982
- Sphedanolestes leeweni Miller, 1958
- Sphedanolestes leroyi Schouteden, 1952
- Sphedanolestes leucorum Miller, 1941
- Sphedanolestes liberiensis Villiers, 1950
- Sphedanolestes lieftincki Miller, 1958
- Sphedanolestes limbativentris Breddin, 1913
- Sphedanolestes lipskii Kiritshenko, 1914
- Sphedanolestes lividigaster (Mulsant & Rey, 1852)
- Sphedanolestes lucidus Miller, 1958
- Sphedanolestes lucorum Miller, 1941
- Sphedanolestes lugens Schouteden, 1952
- Sphedanolestes lundqvisti Miller, 1958
- Sphedanolestes mangenoti Villiers, 1959
- Sphedanolestes marginiventris Distant, 1919
- Sphedanolestes massarti Schouteden, 1952
- Sphedanolestes mateui Villiers, 1982
- Sphedanolestes mayumbensis Schouteden, 1932
- Sphedanolestes meeli Villiers, 1954
- Sphedanolestes meinanderi Villiers, 1969
- Sphedanolestes melanocephalus (Stål, 1863)
- Sphedanolestes mendicus (Stål, 1866)
- Sphedanolestes minusculus Bergroth, 1908
- Sphedanolestes modestus Miller, 1941
- Sphedanolestes nanulus Breddin, 1912
- Sphedanolestes nanus (Stål, 1855)
- Sphedanolestes nigricollis Miller, 1958
- Sphedanolestes nigrirostris Villiers, 1948
- Sphedanolestes nigriventris Schouteden, 1932
- Sphedanolestes nigrocephala Livingstone & Ravichandran, 1990
- Sphedanolestes nigroruber (Dohrn, 1860)
- Sphedanolestes nigrosetosus Villiers, 1976
- Sphedanolestes nodipes Li J, 1981
- Sphedanolestes noualhieri Villiers, 1960
- Sphedanolestes olthofi Miller, 1958
- Sphedanolestes ornaticollis Linnavuori, 1965
- Sphedanolestes oshanini (Reuter, 1877)
- Sphedanolestes par Miller, 1941
- Sphedanolestes pauliani Villiers, 1966
- Sphedanolestes peltigerus Miller, 1956
- Sphedanolestes perrisi (Puton, 1873)
- Sphedanolestes personatus Miller, 1956
- Sphedanolestes piceus Villiers, 1948
- Sphedanolestes picturellus Schouteden, 1932
- Sphedanolestes pilosus Hsiao, 1979
- Sphedanolestes poecilus Miller, 1956
- Sphedanolestes politus (Stål, 1870)
- Sphedanolestes pubinotum Reuter, 1881
- Sphedanolestes pulchellus (Klug, 1830)
- Sphedanolestes pulcher Schouteden, 1906
- Sphedanolestes pulchriventris (Stål, 1863)
- Sphedanolestes quadrinotatus W.Z. Cai, X.Y. Cai & Y.Z. Wang, 2004
- Sphedanolestes raptor Miller, 1941
- Sphedanolestes renaudi Villiers, 1969
- Sphedanolestes riffensis Vidal, 1936
- Sphedanolestes rubecula Distant, 1909
- Sphedanolestes rubicollis Miller, 1958
- Sphedanolestes rubripes W.Z. Cai, X.Y. Cai & Y.Z. Wang, 2004
- Sphedanolestes rugosus Schouteden, 1952
- Sphedanolestes rutshuricus Schouteden, 1944
- Sphedanolestes sabronensis Miller, 1958
- Sphedanolestes sanguineus (Fabricius, 1794)
- Sphedanolestes sarawakensis Miller, 1941
- Sphedanolestes saucius (Stål, 1861)
- Sphedanolestes scandens Miller, 1941
- Sphedanolestes semicroceus Breddin, 1900
- Sphedanolestes sericatus Breddin, 1903
- Sphedanolestes setigerus Villiers, 1973
- Sphedanolestes seyrigi Villiers, 1960
- Sphedanolestes shelfordi Miller, 1941
- Sphedanolestes signatus Distant, 1903
- Sphedanolestes sinicus Cai & S. Yang, 2002
- Sphedanolestes sjoestedti Villiers, 1948
- Sphedanolestes sordidipennis (Dohrn, 1860)
- Sphedanolestes stali Schouteden, 1932
- Sphedanolestes stigmatellus Distant, 1903
- Sphedanolestes subflaviceps (Signoret, 1860)
- Sphedanolestes subtilis (Jakovlev, 1893)
- Sphedanolestes testaceipes Villiers, 1948
- Sphedanolestes toxopeusi Miller, 1958
- Sphedanolestes trichrous Stål, 1874
- Sphedanolestes tricolor Schouteden, 1952
- Sphedanolestes uelensis Schouteden, 1952
- Sphedanolestes upemhensis Villiers, 1954
- Sphedanolestes vallespir Dispons, 1960
- Sphedanolestes variabilis Distant, 1904
- Sphedanolestes varipes Villiers, 1948
- Sphedanolestes verecundus (Stål, 1863)
- Sphedanolestes verhulsti Schouteden, 1944
- Sphedanolestes vesbioides Breddin, 1903
- Sphedanolestes viduus Miller, 1958
- Sphedanolestes wallacei Miller, 1958
- Sphedanolestes wellmani Bergroth, 1908
- Sphedanolestes wollastoni Miller, 1958
- Sphedanolestes xanthogaster (Stål, 1863)
- Sphedanolestes xiongi W.Z. Cai, X.Y. Cai & Y.Z. Wang, 2004
- Sphedanolestes yunnanensis Maldonado, 1979
- Sphedanolestes zhengi Zhao, Ren, Wang & Cai, 2015
