= Evagoras =

Evagoras or Euagoras (Greek: Εὐαγόρας) may refer to:

== People ==
- Evagoras (mythology) for Greek mythological characters named Evagoras
- Evagoras I, king of Salamis in Cyprus, 411–374 BC
- Evagoras II, king of Salamis in Cyprus, 361–351 BC
- Evagoras Pallikarides (1938–1957), Cypriot EOKA fighter
- Evagoras Hadjifrangiskou (born 1986), Cypriot footballer

== Other uses ==
- Evagoras, an oration by Isocrates
- Euagoras (bug), a genus of assassin bugs
- Evagoras Amiandos, Cypriot football team
- Evagoras Avgorou, Cypriot football team
- Evagoras Pallikarides Agion Trimithias, Cypriot football team
- Evagoras Paphos, Cypriot football team
