= Dicrotelini =

Scientific classification
- Kingdom: Animalia
- Phylum: Arthropoda
- Clade: Pancrustacea
- Class: Insecta
- Order: Hemiptera
- Suborder: Heteroptera
- Superfamily: Reduvioidea
- Family: Reduviidae
- Subfamily: Harpactorinae
- Tribe: Dicrotelini; Stål, 1859

Tribe of true bugs

The Dicrotelini are a tribe of assassin bugs in the subfamily Harpactorinae. Originally described by Carl Stål, genera and species have been recorded from Asia and Australia.

== Genera ==
BioLib lists the following:

- Arrilpecoris Malipatil, 1988
- Asiacoris Tomokuni & Cai, 2002 - monotypic A. pudicus (Vietnam)
- Barlireduvius Malipatil, 1988
- Dicrotelus Erichson, 1842
- Henricohahnia Breddin, 1900
- Hsiaotycoris Lu et al., 2006
- Karenocoris Miller, 1954
- Karlacoris Malipatil, 1988
- Malaiseana Miller, 1954
- Nyllius Stål, 1859
- Paranyllius Miller, 1954
- Tapirocoris Miller, 1954
- Yangicoris Cai, 1995
