= Amauroclopius ornatus =

Scientific classification
- Domain: Eukaryota
- Kingdom: Animalia
- Phylum: Arthropoda
- Class: Insecta
- Order: Hemiptera
- Suborder: Heteroptera
- Family: Reduviidae
- Genus: Amauroclopius
- Species: A. ornatus

Binomial name
- Amauroclopius ornatus Distant, 1903

Species of true bug

Amauroclopius ornatus is an assassin bug that is thought to prey upon bees. A. ornatus is associated with the cativo tree of Colombia (Prioria copaifera Leguminosae / Caesalpinioideae).

Wygodzinsky reported an individual of A. ornatus to be found feeding on a bee. Probably A. ornatus feeds upon euglossine bees, as these bees are known to use the resins of the Prioria tree in their nest construction. Other Apiomerini also show these kinds of associations with bees and plant resins.
