= Liangcoris =

Scientific classification
- Domain: Eukaryota
- Kingdom: Animalia
- Phylum: Arthropoda
- Class: Insecta
- Order: Hemiptera
- Suborder: Heteroptera
- Family: Reduviidae
- Subfamily: Harpactorinae
- Genus: Liangcoris; Zhao, Cai & Ren, 2007
- Species: L. yangae

Binomial name
- Liangcoris yangae Zhao, Cai & Ren, 2007

Genus of true bugs

Liangcoris is a monotypic genus of assassin bugs (family Reduviidae), in the subfamily Harpactorinae, native to China, containing a single species, Liangcoris yangae.
