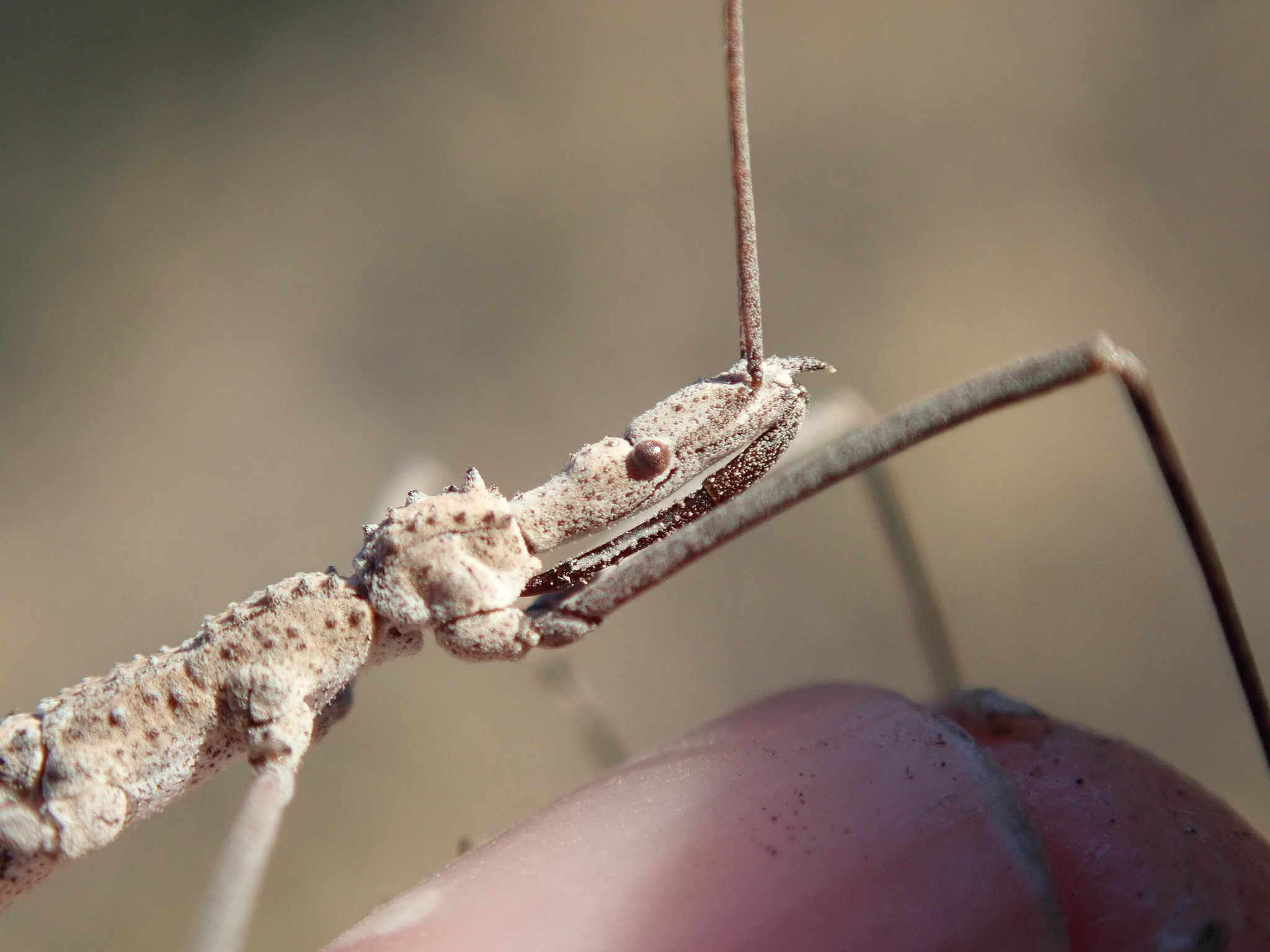
- Leptodema, Botswana

Scientific classification
- Kingdom: Animalia
- Phylum: Arthropoda
- Class: Insecta
- Order: Hemiptera
- Suborder: Heteroptera
- Family: Reduviidae
- Subfamily: Harpactorinae
- Tribe: Rhaphidosomatini
- Genus: Leptodema de Carlini, 1892

= Leptodema =

Genus of true bugs

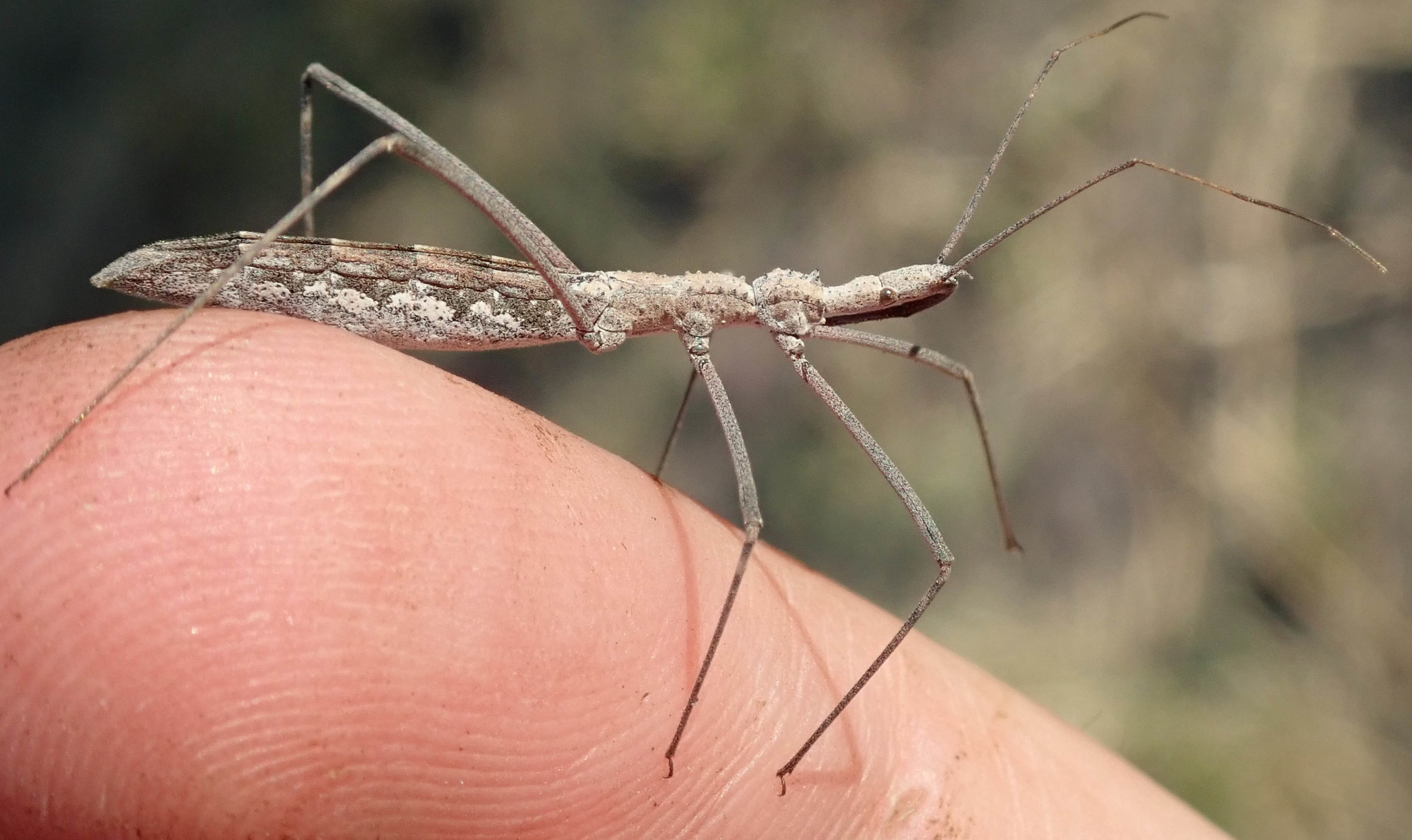
Leptodema, Botswana

Leptodema is a small genus of African bugs in the family Reduviidae (assassin bugs). As of April 2020, the Integrated Taxonomic Information System lists nine species in the genus Leptodema:

== Species ==
- Leptodema acanthocephala de Carlini, 1892
- Leptodema echinata (Gerstaecker, 1892)
- Leptodema elisabethae Schouteden, 1913
- Leptodema farinaria Bergroth, 1908
- Leptodema hirta de Carlini, 1892
- Leptodema laticollis Miller, 1950
- Leptodema petchkovskyi Villiers, 1958
- Leptodema rodriguesi Villiers, 1952
- Leptodema scotti Miller, 1954
