= Heniartes =

Scientific classification
- Kingdom: Animalia
- Phylum: Arthropoda
- Clade: Pancrustacea
- Class: Insecta
- Order: Hemiptera
- Suborder: Heteroptera
- Family: Reduviidae
- Tribe: Apiomerini
- Genus: Heniartes; Spinola, 1840

Genus of true bugs

Heniartes is a large genus of assassin bugs belonging to the family Reduviidae; 32 species have been described, all from South America.

== Partial species list ==
- Heniartes australis
- Heniartes cachabi Wygodzinsky, 1947
- Heniartes distinguendus Wygodzinsky, 1947
- Heniartes erythromerus Spinola, 1837
- Heniartes flavicans
- Heniartes lopesi Wygodzinsky, 1947
- Heniartes malaisei Wygodzinsky 1953
- Heniartes putumayo Wygodzinsky, 1947
