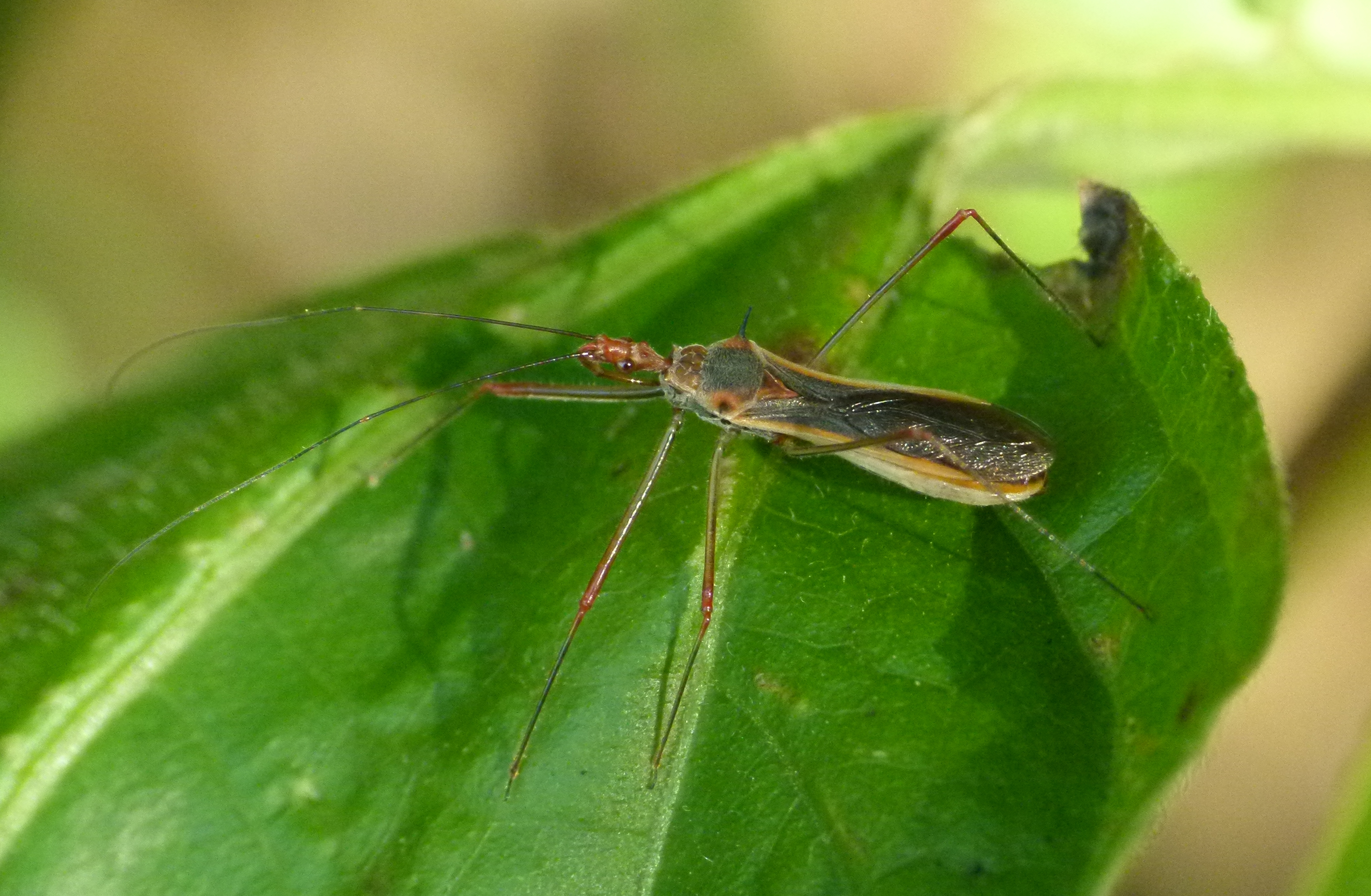
- A species from southern India

Scientific classification
- Domain: Eukaryota
- Kingdom: Animalia
- Phylum: Arthropoda
- Class: Insecta
- Order: Hemiptera
- Suborder: Heteroptera
- Family: Reduviidae
- Tribe: Harpactorini
- Genus: Euagoras; Burmeister, 1835

Synonyms
- Darbanus Amyot & Serville, 1843; Eccagoras Stål, 1855

= Euagoras (bug) =

Genus of true bugs

Euagoras is a genus of assassin bugs (insects in the family Reduviidae), in the subfamily Harpactorinae. Species are found in Asia and Australia.

== Species ==
The Global Biodiversity Information Facility lists:

- Euagoras ambesus Miller, 1941
- Euagoras annulatus Horváth, 1919
- Euagoras asseda Stål, 1863
- Euagoras atripes Stål, 1863
- Euagoras bispinosus (Fabricius, 1803)
- Euagoras buruensis Miller, 1954
- Euagoras crockeri Van Duzee, 1940
- Euagoras dolosus Stål, 1863
- Euagoras dorycus (Boisduval, 1835)
- Euagoras elegans Miller, 1948
- Euagoras erythrocephala Livingstone & Ravichandran, 1990
- Euagoras fuscipinus (Stål, 1859)
- Euagoras geniculatus Breddin, 1859
- Euagoras insipidus (Signoret, 1860)
- Euagoras intermedius Miller, 1941
- Euagoras limbatus Breddin, 1899
- Euagoras pallescens Herrich-Schaeffer, 1850
- Euagoras plagiatus (Burmeister, 1834)
- Euagoras sordidatus Stål, 1866
- Euagoras stollii Burmeister, 1835
- Euagoras subunicolor (Breddin, 1901)
- Euagoras tagalicus Stål, 1870
