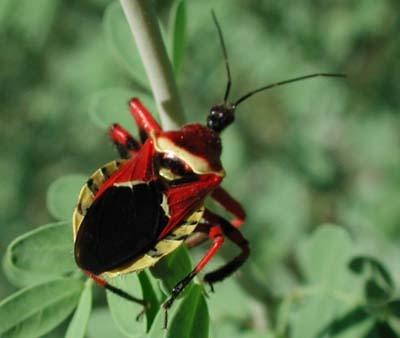
- Apiomerus spissipes

Scientific classification
- Domain: Eukaryota
- Kingdom: Animalia
- Phylum: Arthropoda
- Class: Insecta
- Order: Hemiptera
- Suborder: Heteroptera
- Family: Reduviidae
- Subfamily: Harpactorinae
- Tribe: Apiomerini; Amyot and Serville, 1843

= Apiomerini =

Tribe of true bugs

The Apiomerini are a tribe of the Harpactorinae (assassin bugs). This tribe is restricted to the New World and consists of 11 genera.

== Partial list of genera ==
- Agriocleptus Stål, 1866
- Agriocoris Stål, 1866
- Amauroclopius Stål, 1868
- Apiomerus Hahn, 1831
- Beharus Fabricius, 1803
- Heniartes Spinola, 1840
- Manicocoris Fabricius, 1787
- Micrauchenus Amyot & Servile, 1843
- Ponerobia Amyot & Serville, 1843
