= Amauroclopius =

Scientific classification
- Kingdom: Animalia
- Phylum: Arthropoda
- Clade: Pancrustacea
- Class: Insecta
- Order: Hemiptera
- Suborder: Heteroptera
- Family: Reduviidae
- Tribe: Apiomerini
- Genus: Amauroclopius; Stål, 1868

Genus of true bugs

Amauroclopius is a small genus of assassin bugs belonging to the family Reduviidae.

The genus consists of two described species, both of which are found in South America.

== Partial species list ==
- Amauroclopius ornatus Distant, 1903
- Amauroclopius bispinus Stål, 1868
