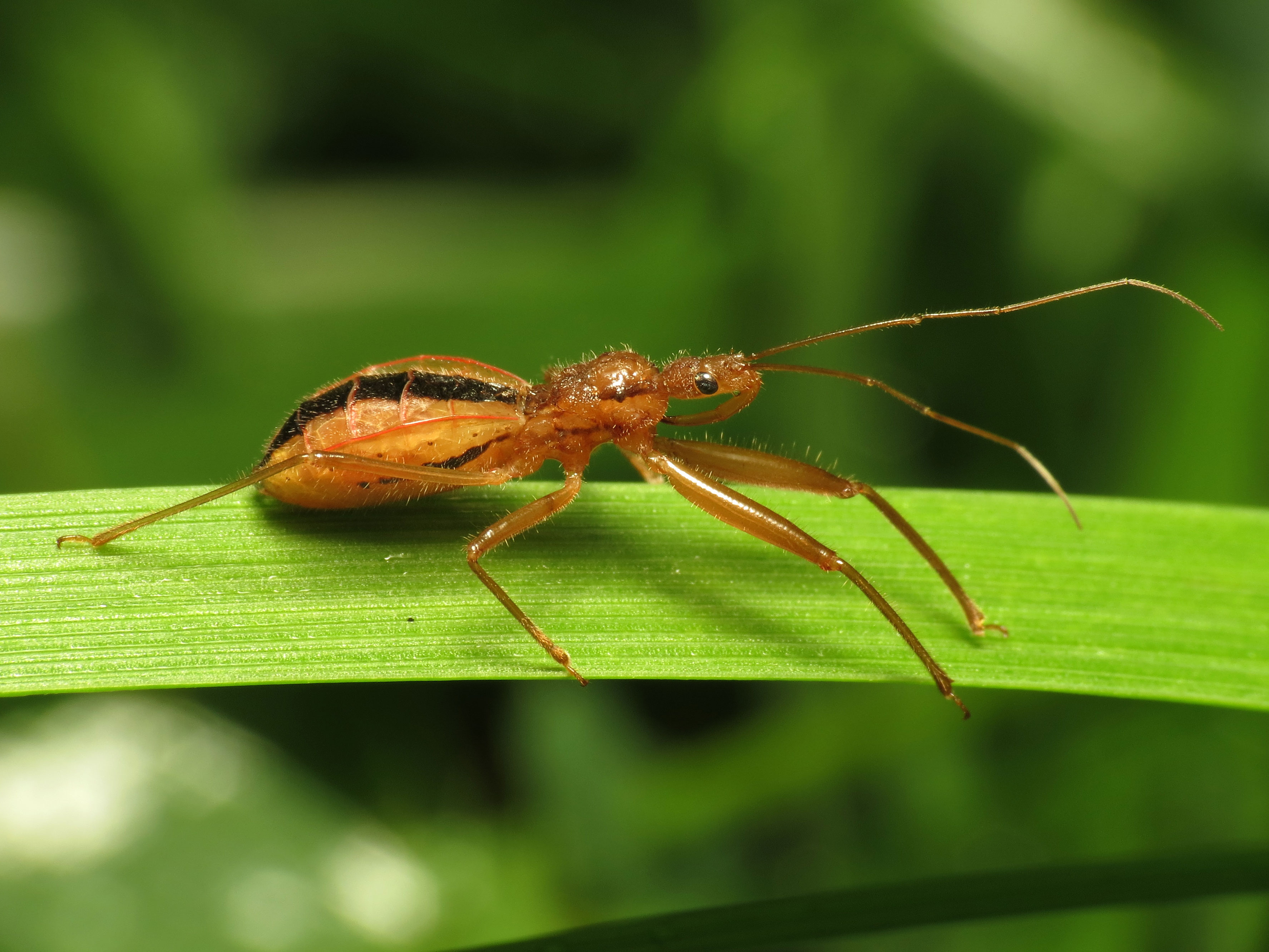
- Fitchia aptera

Scientific classification
- Domain: Eukaryota
- Kingdom: Animalia
- Phylum: Arthropoda
- Class: Insecta
- Order: Hemiptera
- Suborder: Heteroptera
- Family: Reduviidae
- Subfamily: Harpactorinae
- Genus: Fitchia; Stal, 1859

= Fitchia (bug) =

Genus of true bugs

Fitchia is a genus of assassin bugs in the family Reduviidae. There are at least two described species in Fitchia.

ITIS Taxonomic note:

- Apparently a 'parahomonym' of (different kingdom, same name as) vascular plant genus Fitchia Hook. f.

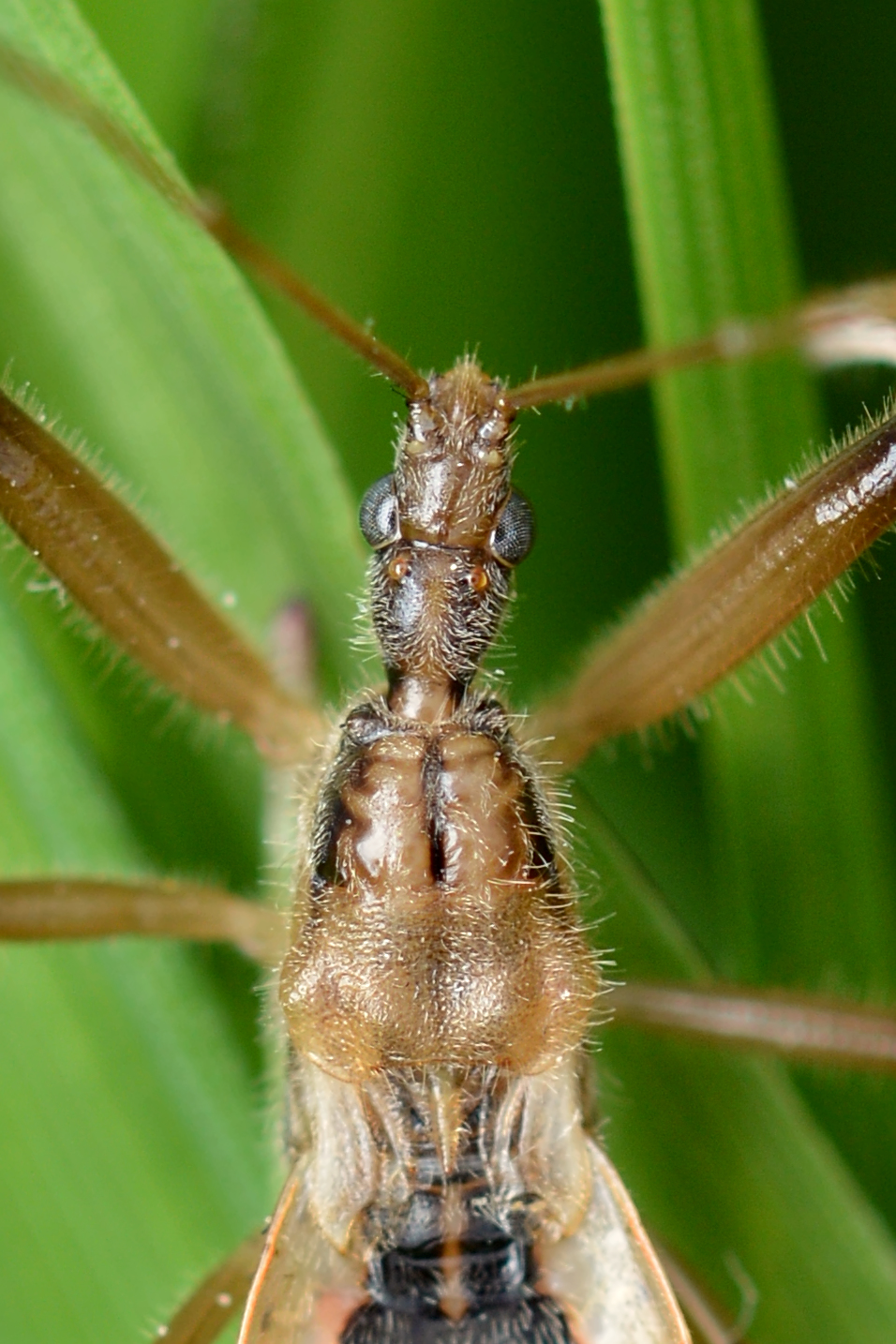
Fitchia aptera

== Species ==
- Fitchia aptera Stål, 1859
- Fitchia spinosula Stål, 1872
