= Agriocleptus =

Scientific classification
- Kingdom: Animalia
- Phylum: Arthropoda
- Clade: Pancrustacea
- Class: Insecta
- Order: Hemiptera
- Suborder: Heteroptera
- Family: Reduviidae
- Tribe: Apiomerini
- Genus: Agriocleptus; Stål, 1866

Genus of true bugs

Agriocleptus is a small genus of assassin bugs (insects belonging to the family Reduviidae).

The genus consists of 8 described species, all of which are found in Central and South America.

== Partial species list ==
- Agriocleptes albosparsus
- Agriocleptes bergi Wygodzinsky, 1953
- Agriocleptes wygodzinskyi Prosen & Martínez, 1953
