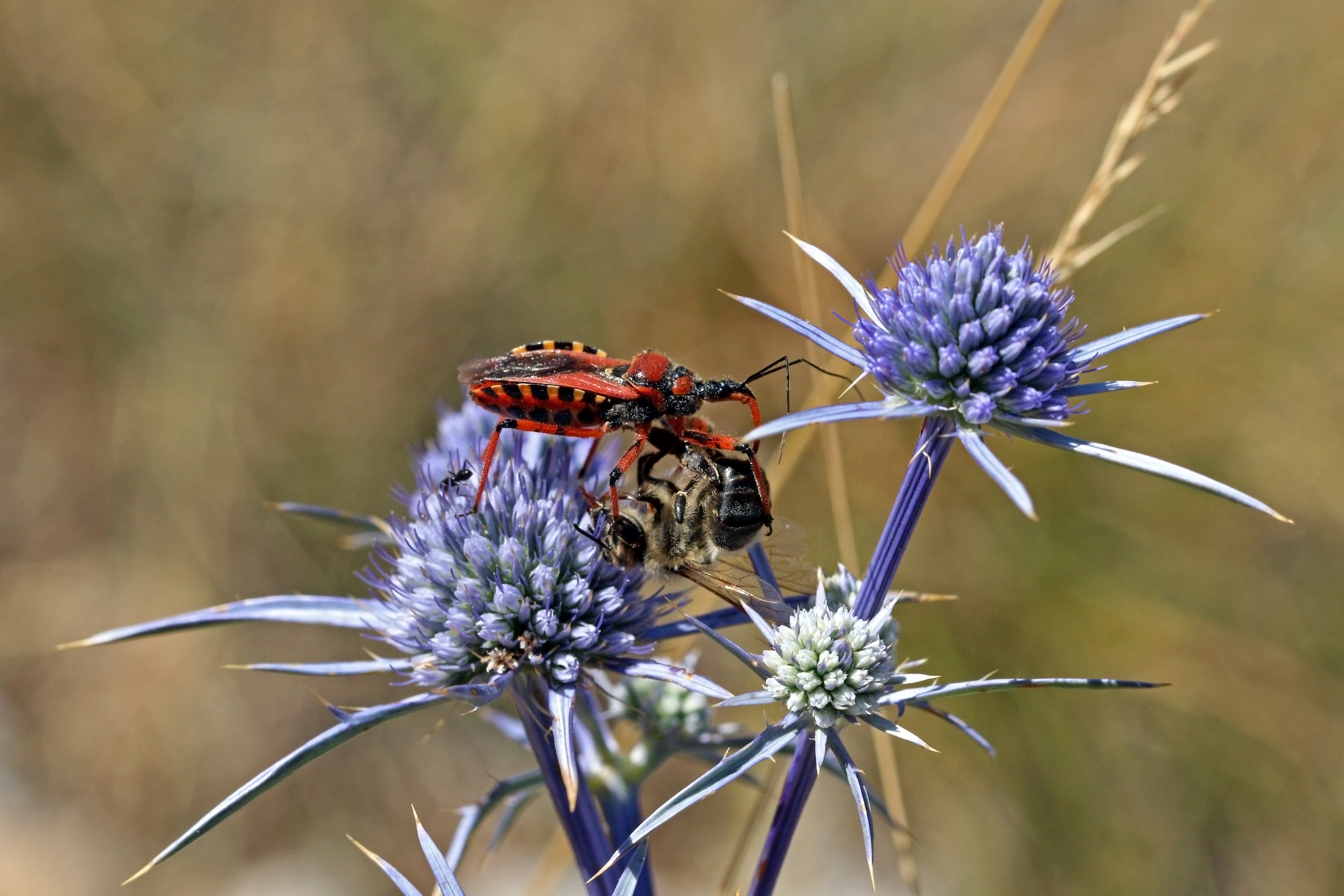
- assassin bug (Rhynocoris iracundus) with bee prey

Scientific classification
- Domain: Eukaryota
- Kingdom: Animalia
- Phylum: Arthropoda
- Class: Insecta
- Order: Hemiptera
- Suborder: Heteroptera
- Infraorder: Cimicomorpha
- Family: Reduviidae
- Subfamily: Harpactorinae; Amyot and Serville, 1843

Tribes & Genera
- see text

= Harpactorinae =

Subfamily of true bugs

The Harpactorinae are a large subfamily of the Reduviidae (assassin bugs). About 300 genera and 2,000 species worldwide have been described. Some of the species of the genera Zelus, Pselliopus, Sinea, and Apiomerus are of interest as biological pest control agents.

== Tribes and genera ==
The genera of six tribes include:

=== Apiomerini ===
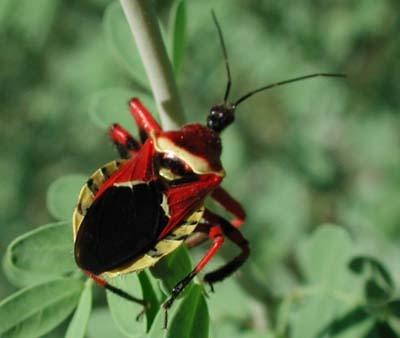
Apiomerus spissipes

New World resin bugs: auth. Amyot & Audinet-Serville, 1843

- Agriocleptus Stål, 1866
- Agriocoris Stål, 1866
- Amauroclopius Stål, 1868
- Apiomerus Hahn, 1831
- Beharus Fabricius, 1803
- Calliclopius Stål, 1868
- Foucartus Berenger, 2006
- Heniartes Spinola, 1840
- Manicocoris Fabricius, 1787
- Micrauchenus Amyot & Servile, 1843
- Ponerobia Amyot & Serville, 1843
- Sphodrolestes Stål, 1866

=== Diaspidiini ===
African resin bugs: auth. Miller, 1959

- Cleontes Stål, 1874
- Diaspidius Westwood, 1837
- Rodhainiella Schouteden, 1913

=== Dicrotelini ===
Asia, Australia; auth. Stål, 1859. Approximately 13 genera including:

- type genus - Dicrotelus Erichson, 1842

=== Ectinoderini ===
Oriental resin bugs: auth. Stål, 1859

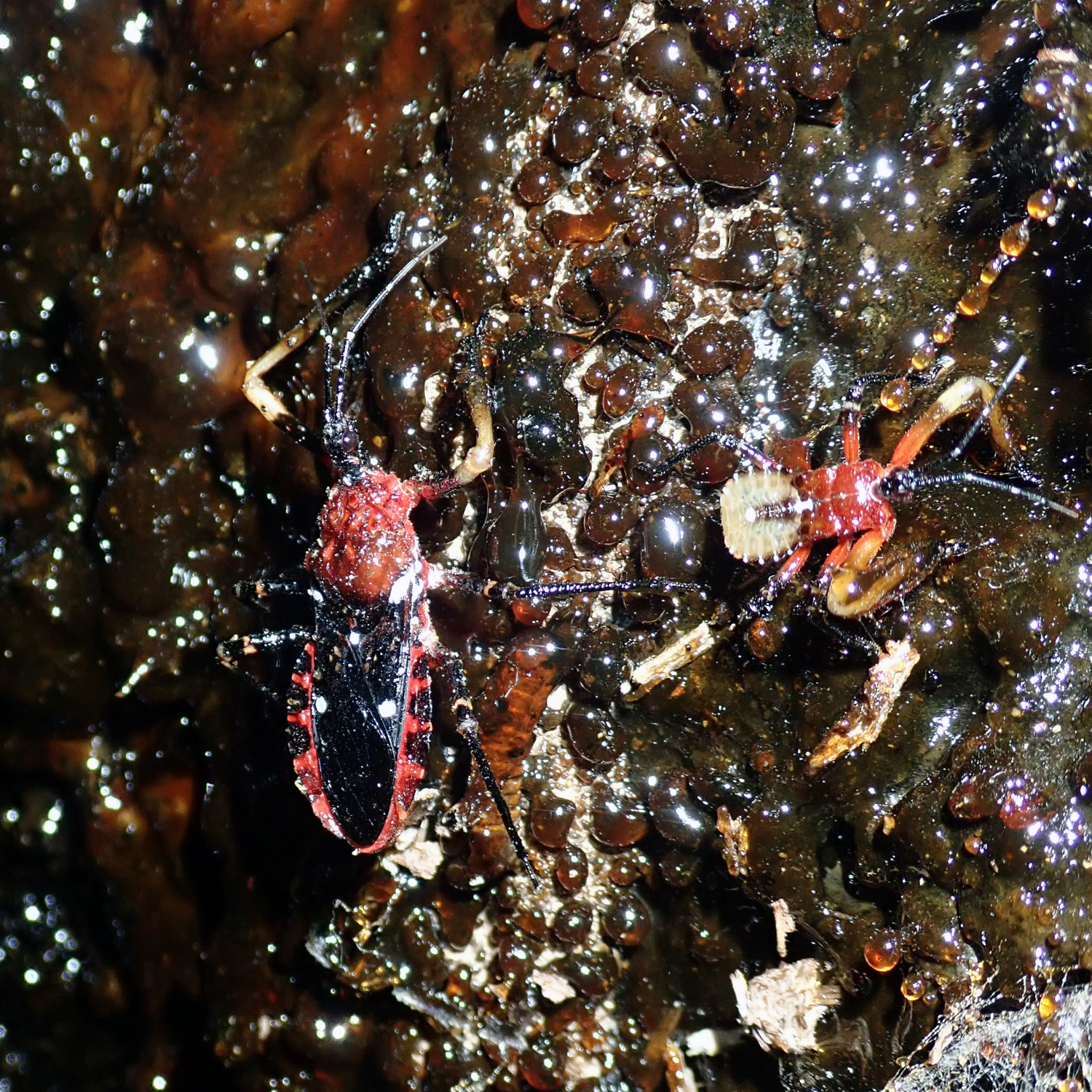
Ectinoderus sp. on Dipterocarpus gum

- Amulius Stål, 1866
- Ectinoderus Westwood, 1845

=== Harpactorini ===
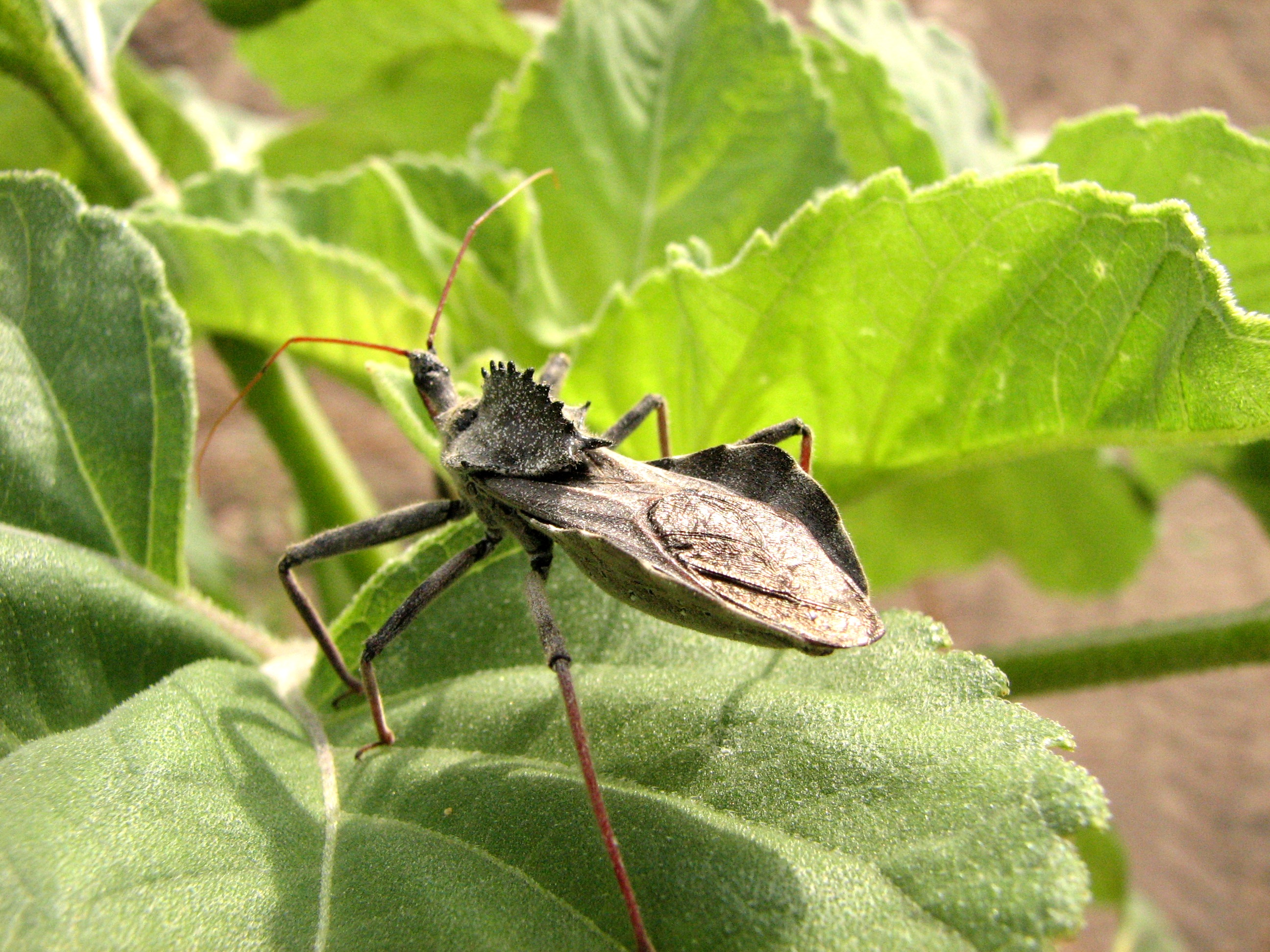
Arilus cristatus: the "wheel bug"

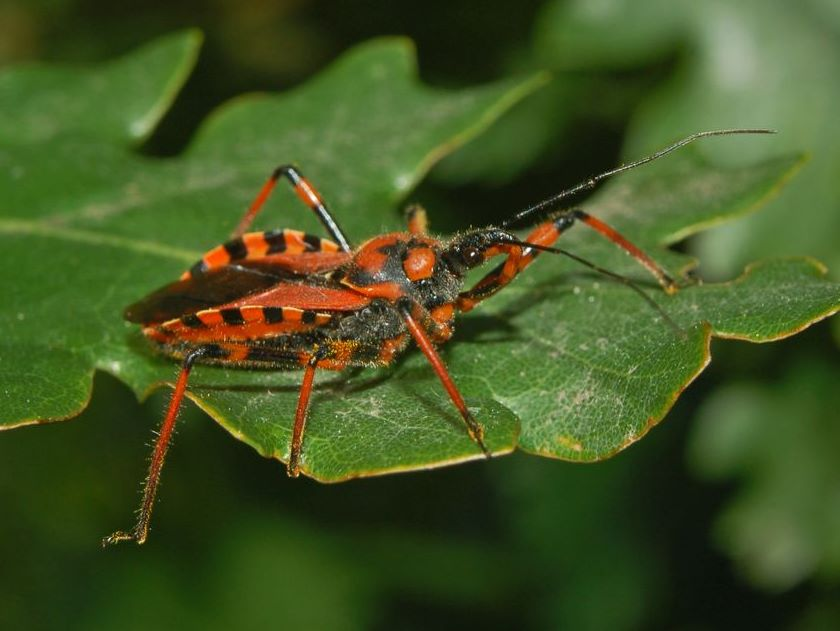
Rhynocoris rubricus

A partial list of genera in this tribe includes:

- Acholla Stål, 1862
- Arilus Hahn, 1831
- Atrachelus Amyot and Serville, 1843
- Castolus Stål, 1858
- Camptibia Cai, 2003
- Coranus Curtis, 1833
- Doldina Stål, 1859
- Euagoras Burmeister, 1835
- Eulyes Amyot & Serville, 1843
- Fitchia Stål, 1859
- Harpactor Laporte, 1833
- Harpactorella - monotypic Harpactorella frederici Wygodzinsky, 1946
- Heza Amyot and Serville, 1843
- Irantha Stål, 1861
- Liangcoris Zhao, Cai & Ren, 2007
- Nagusta Stål, 1859
- Pahabengkakia Miller, 1941
- Pselliopus Bergroth, 1905
- Repipta Stål, 1859
- Rhynocoris Hahn, 1834
- Rocconota Stål, 1859
- Sinea Amyot and Serville, 1843
- Sphedanolestes Stål
- Sycanus Amyot and Serville, 1843
- Zelus Fabricius, 1802
- Zostus Stål, 1874

=== Rhaphidosomatini ===
(synonym: Rhaphidosomini Distant, 1904)

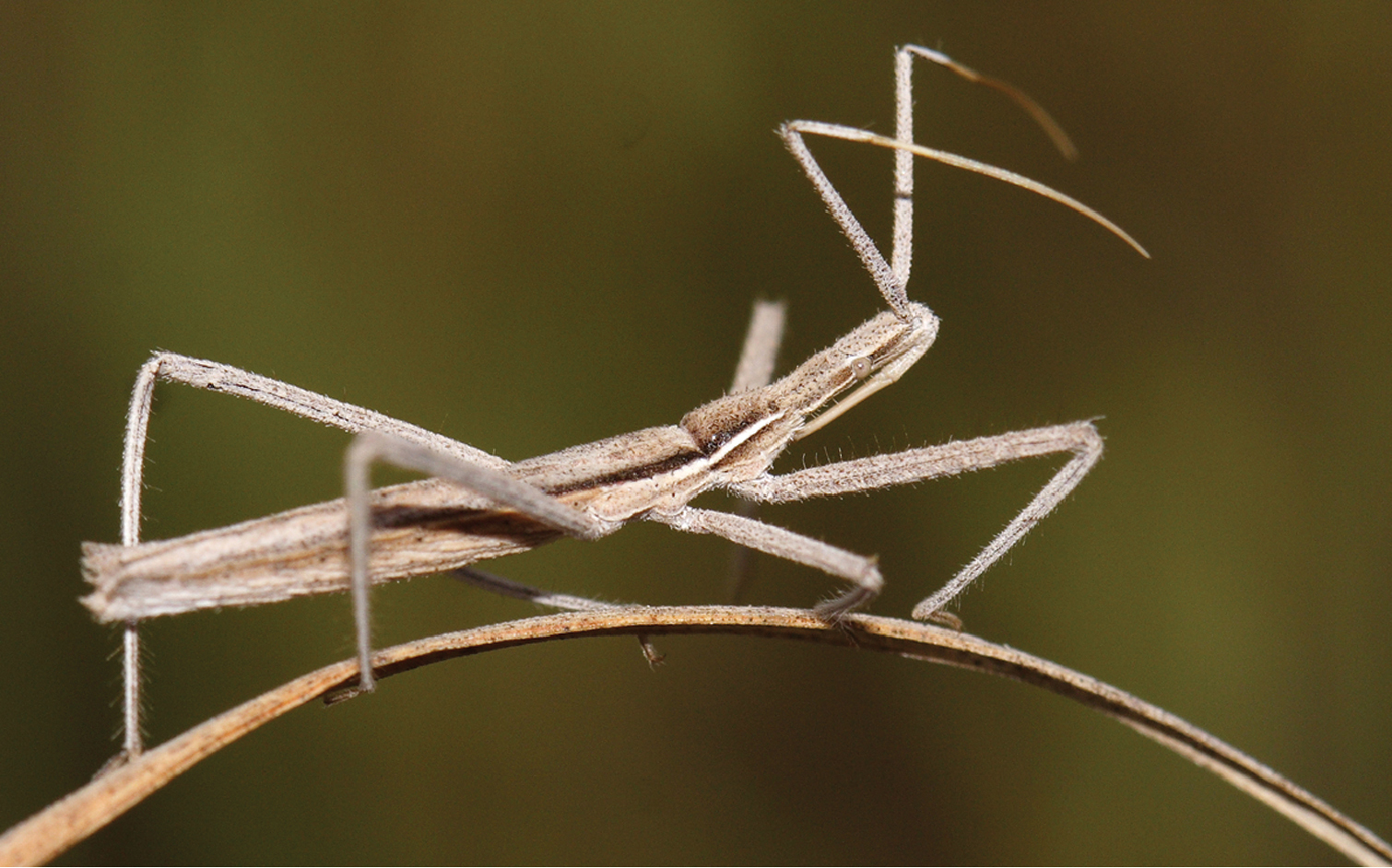
Vibertiola cinerea

- Hoffmannocoris China, 1940
- Leptodema De Carlini, 1892
- Rhaphidosoma Amyot & Serville, 1843
- Vibertiola Horvath, 1909 - southern Europe, NW Africa

=== Other Tribes ===
Tegeini (sometimes placed as subfamily Tegeinae)

- Phonolibes Stål, 1854 - SE Africa
- Tegea (insect) Stål, 1863 - Australia
