= Trigona collina =

Scientific classification
- Domain: Eukaryota
- Kingdom: Animalia
- Phylum: Arthropoda
- Class: Insecta
- Order: Hymenoptera
- Family: Apidae
- Genus: Trigona
- Species: T. collina

Binomial name
- Trigona collina Smith, 1857

Species of bee

Trigona collina is one of the stingless bee species with reported nesting sites in Thailand.
