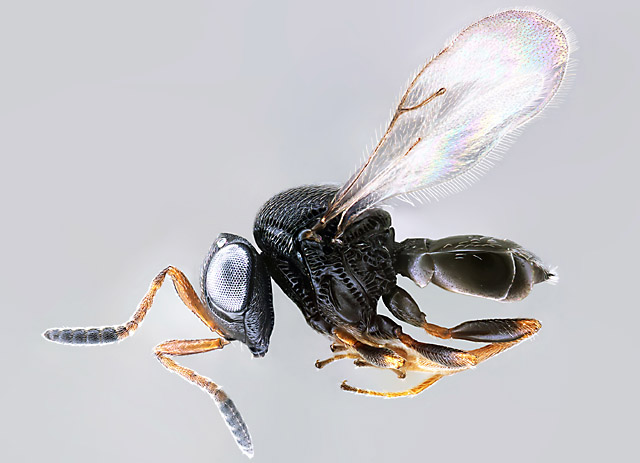

Scientific classification
- Kingdom: Animalia
- Phylum: Arthropoda
- Clade: Pancrustacea
- Class: Insecta
- Order: Hymenoptera
- Family: Scelionidae
- Genus: Trissolcus
- Species: T. japonicus

Binomial name
- Trissolcus japonicus (Ashmead, 1904)

Synonyms
- Trissolcus halyomorphae Yang et al, 2009

= Trissolcus japonicus =

Species of wasp

Trissolcus japonicus, the samurai wasp, is a parasitoid wasp species in the family Scelionidae, native to east Asia but now found in Europe, North America, and Chile. It is chiefly known for parasitizing Halyomorpha halys (brown marmorated stink bug). It deposits eggs into the eggs of the stink bug, and as the wasp larvae develop, they kill the stink bug eggs. A single adult wasp emerges from each stink bug egg.

== Taxonomy ==
Trissolcus japonicus was originally described by American entomologist William Harris Ashmead in 1904, and transferred to the genus Trissolcus in 1968. All species within the genus Trissolcus are egg parasitoids of Pentatomoidea (stink bugs and their allies). Trissolcus halyomorphae was in use from 2009, but has since been classified as a junior synonym of Trissolcus japonicus.

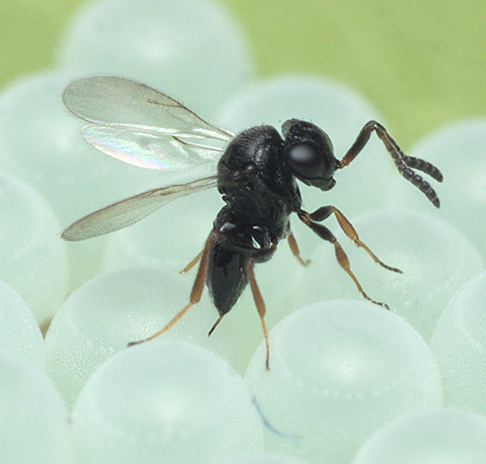
Female T. japonicus about to oviposit in the eggs of brown marmorated stink bug.

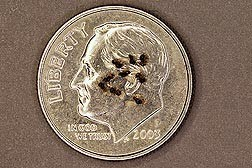
T. japonicus specimens on a US dime.

== Description ==
Adults of this species are small black wasps with orange and black legs and antennae. The adult samurai wasp is 1–2 millimetres (3/64–5/64 in) in length. The size of the wasp depends on the size of the host egg from which it emerged. It does not sting people.

== Distribution ==
The samurai wasp is native to Eastern Asia, including China, Japan, Korea, and Taiwan.

In 2014, two adventive populations were found in the United States during surveys to identify which North American parasitoids might be attacking brown marmorated stink bug. Subsequent genetic testing showed these wild populations were self-introduced: they were not related to each other, or to the laboratory strain of parasitoids housed in quarantine for biosafety testing since 2007. An adventive European population was discovered during similar surveys in Switzerland in 2017.

== Biological control ==
Trissolcus japonicus is currently the subject of biological control programs against the brown marmorated stink bug (BMSB) in the US, Europe, and New Zealand. In the United States, it will likely take years for the wasps to build up large enough densities in the wild to have a measurable impact on BMSB populations, but efforts are under way to augment wild populations with laboratory reared specimens. Recent redistribution efforts of T. japonicus in New York State also engages citizen science project participants in reducing urban BMSB populations. In New Zealand, host range testing has shown it attacks the endemic alpine shield bug (Hypsithocus hudsonae) in laboratory tests when a parasitoid is confined with an egg mass.

== Life cycle ==
In its native range, the samurai wasp is able to complete up to 10 generations per year, while its primary host, brown marmorated stink bug, completes up to 2. Female wasps lay on average 42 eggs, preferring to oviposit into host eggs younger than 3 days old. Males hatch first and mate with their sisters.
