= Catface =

Catface may mean:

- Cat-facing, fruit deformity
- Catface, a series of cuts or scars in the trunk of a pine tree used with the Herty system of harvesting resin to make turpentine
