= Citizen science and sustainable agriculture =

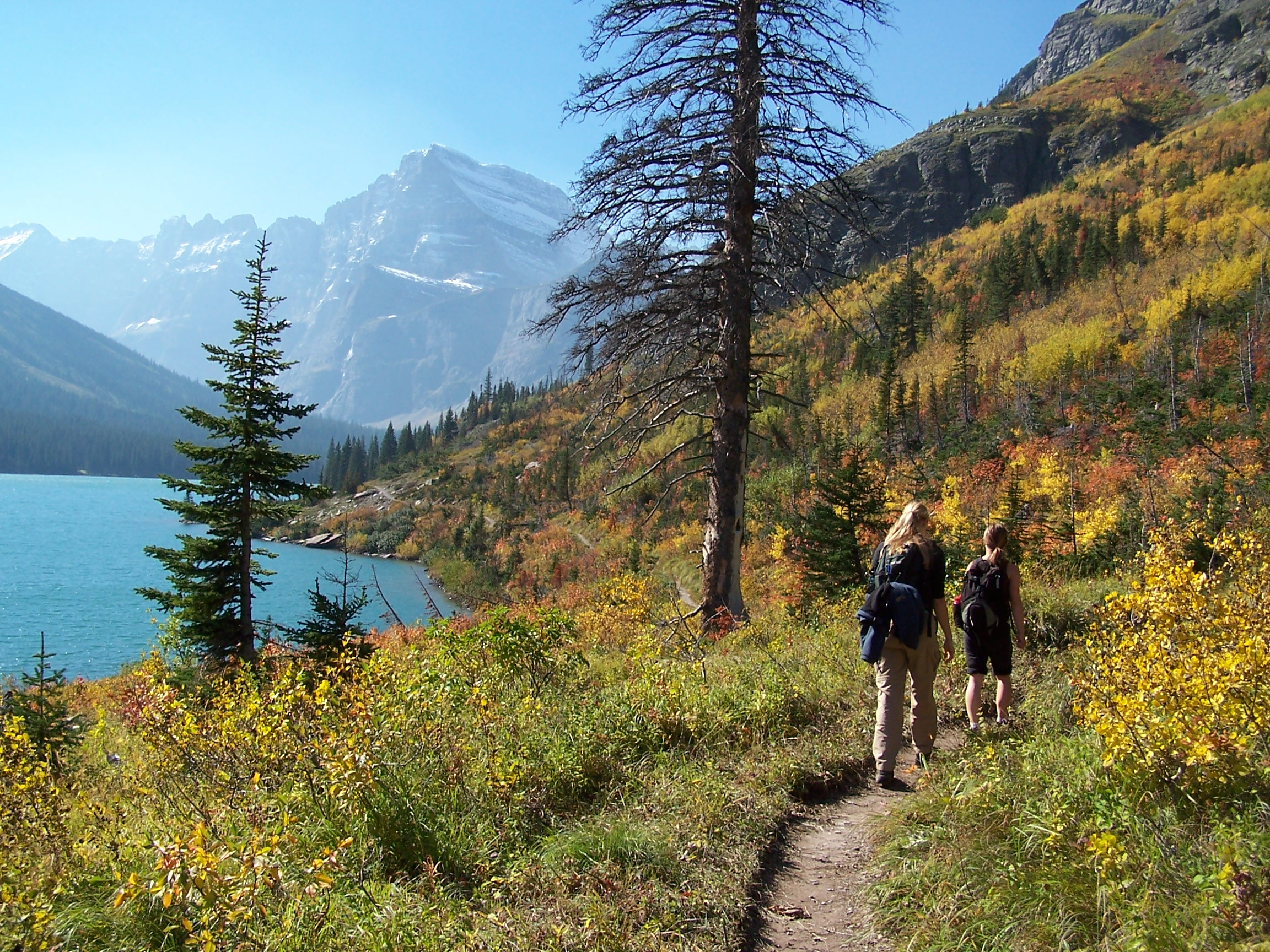
Hiking to a citizen science survey site in Glacier National Park.

Citizen science has been promoted as a strategy to further sustainable agriculture via public participation in research and case studies. Through public engagement, a variety of sustainable agriculture methods can be learned and practiced, in contrast to relying upon only professional-scientific studies to further research. Public participation is designed to allow those outside professional science to identify problems in sustainable agriculture that most directly affect them and help generate solutions through the collaboration between the broader public and researchers.

As global patterns in the 21st century trend towards more extreme climate events, which can lead to disruptions in the food system and impact overall human health, citizen science and sustainable agriculture present a possible solution. Preliminary research indicates that there is opportunity for sustainable agriculture to be enhanced through citizen science, particularly in partnership with farmers, in advancing food justice and increasing understanding of diverse farming techniques and technologies.

== Citizen science ==
Citizen science can be broadly defined as any type of research, data-collection, or knowledge-production that contributes to collective scientific understanding and fields, but is conducted by the public or non-professional scientists. There are multiple definitions and interpretations, indicating there is not one formal understanding. While the term "citizen science" was introduced by the United States and United Kingdom in the mid-1900s, it has been incorporated across many countries over generations. Perceived benefits include building connections between formal scientists and the general public, and generating projects and data that are more aligned with current societal or policy needs. Criticisms and limitations include varying priorities and values, the potential for bias to be introduced in the data, the public perception of data as being non-credible, challenges in data dissemination, maintaining privacy, and loss of global context when focusing at a hyper-local spatial scale.

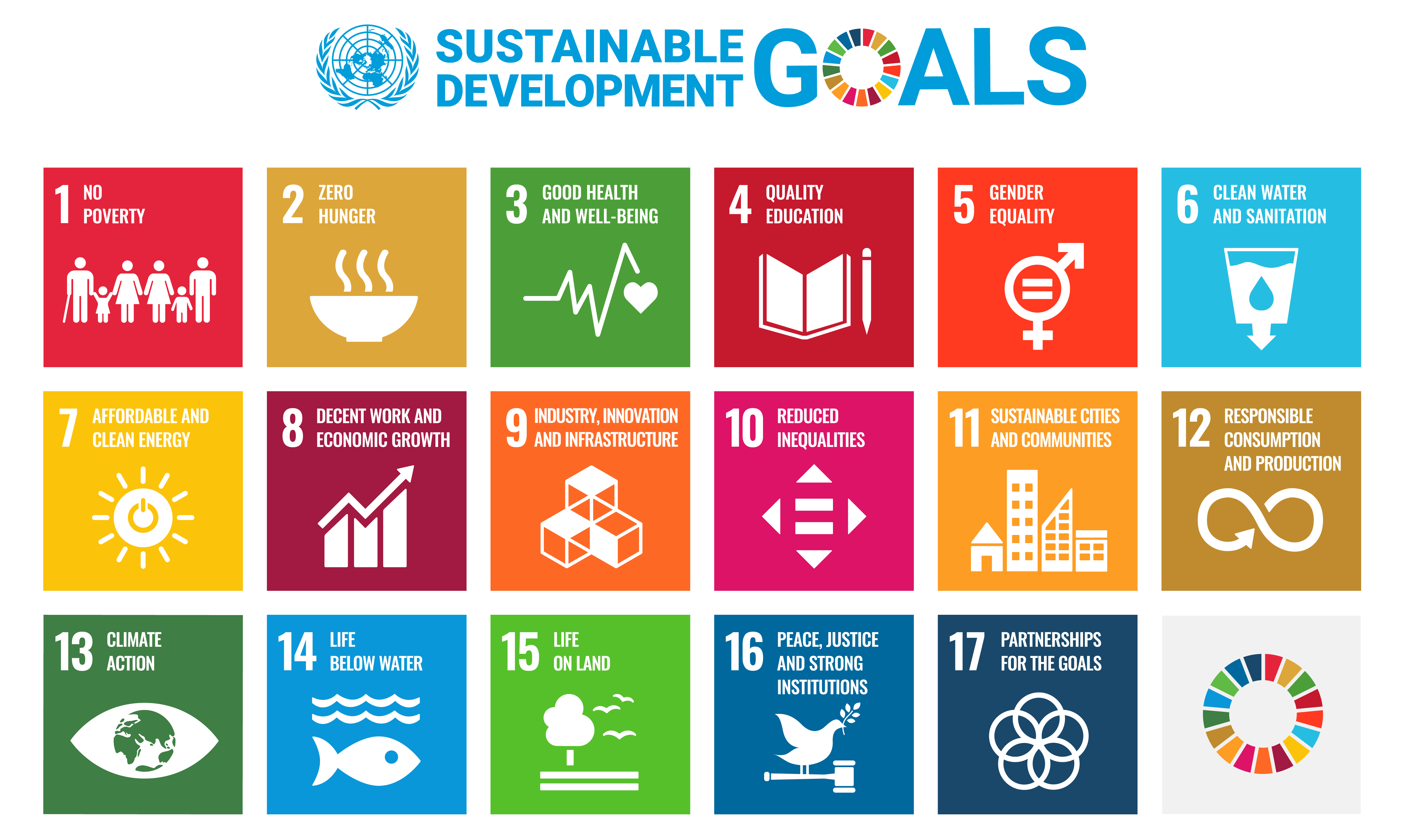
The Sustainable Development Goals, adopted on 25 September 2015 as a part of the 2030 Agenda.

== Achieving goals ==
Citizen science has been promoted for achieving major policy goals, such as the UN Agenda 2030 for Sustainable Development and its Sustainable Development Goals, and as a way to monitor and evaluate global policy components and goals such as zero hunger and reducing inequalities among countries. Increasing participation and engagement across the population is one way to educate citizens about sustainable development goals and create a sense of shared responsibility.

== Sustainable agriculture ==
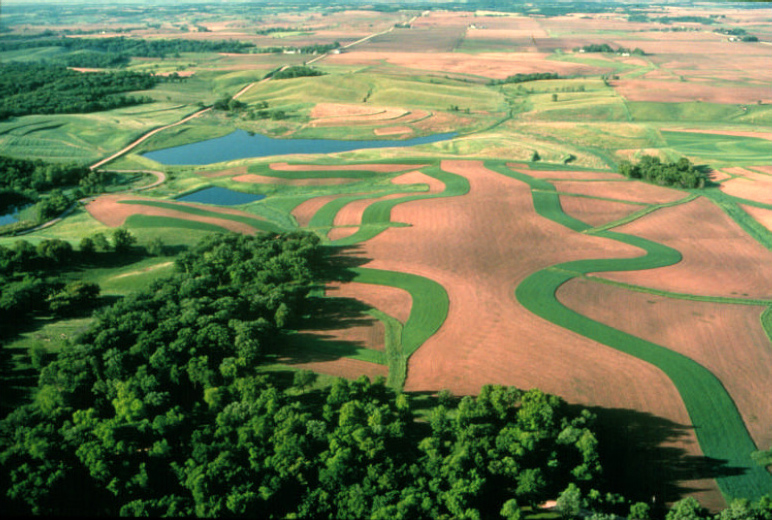
Contour farming. View of contour buffer strips on farm land in the United States, a conservation practice to reduce erosion and water pollution.

Sustainable agriculture can be broadly defined as farming via methods that satisfy food and production needs while remaining profitable and sustaining farmers, the environment, and natural resources. The definition of sustainable agriculture varies depending on whether it is being defined within political or scientific discourse. The global political discourse focuses on economic and social dimensions, such as food production to support the world's increasing population, with a focus on developing countries and human rights. The scientific discourse centralizes the agricultural sector and environmental management and protection within it.

Sustainable agricultural practices and technologies can help mitigate extreme climate events by meeting increasing human needs and improving the resilience and sustainability of ecosystems and natural resources. Sustainable agricultural technologies generally do not have adverse environmental impacts, improve the natural environment, are affordable and effective, and improve food production.

=== Fundamentals of sustainable agriculture ===
The following are examples of standard practices and frameworks for sustainable agriculture:

- Integrated farm management is the combination of natural and human capital to solve agricultural and environmental issues. Natural-based solutions include methods such as soil regeneration, nutrient cycling, allelopathy, and nitrogen fixation. These solutions build resilience, contribute to biodiversity, and support ecosystem services. Human capital includes farmers' skills and knowledge of agricultural practices.
- Dynamic balance requires ongoing evaluation of agricultural methods to ensure that negative environmental and socio-economic impacts are mitigated, while the benefits are maximized. This includes minimizing the use of non-renewable resources.
- Regenerative design refers to designing systems with sustainable agricultural intensification, regenerative agriculture, and a circular economy in mind. This allows for the preservation of both food security and natural resources in the long-run.
- Social development includes increasing community engagement and reducing inequities in agricultural production processes. The focus is on developing social capital and enabling equal participation in agricultural development.

== Applications ==
Advocates for citizen science in sustainable agriculture propose that it helps increase the amount of available information and supports those who participate in the process. Citizens who participate are not academics but rather ordinary people, which offers a new view on the problems and questions being addressed. This allows researchers to identify which problems matter the most to farmers and what gaps exist in the research. The amount of data generated from these efforts expands the research pool as well.

The process integrates the public into the problems being addressed in sustainable agriculture and allows for widespread communication across participants who can share new information and techniques for dealing with related problems. Access to researchers can provide supplemental knowledge, support community members to tackle the problems they regularly face, and advises them on how to argue for changes in the political field.

== Examples of citizen science in sustainable agriculture ==
Citizen science efforts can involve documentation, reporting, and sharing of observations for sustainable agriculture methods.

=== Pest and pathogen monitoring ===
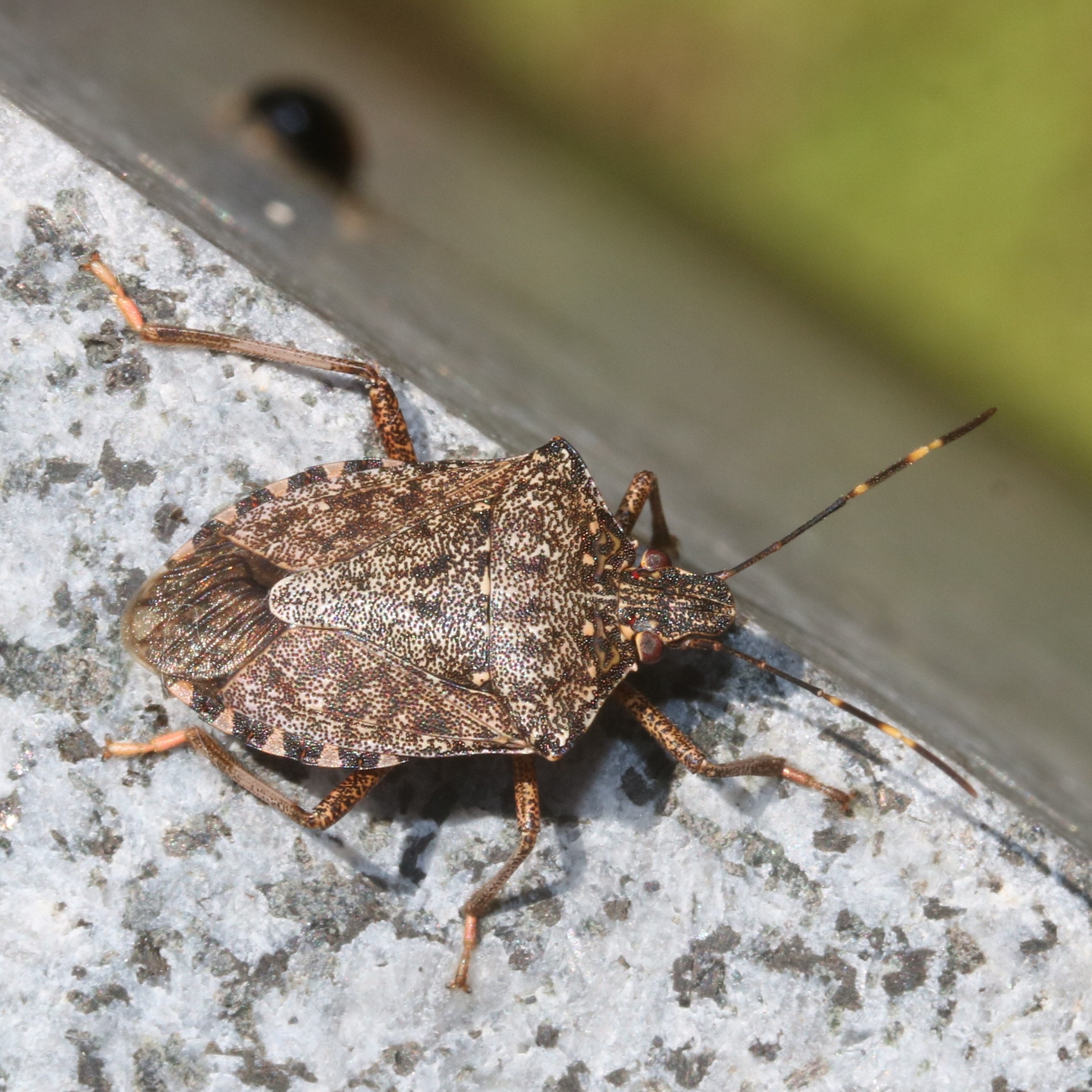
Brown marmorated stink bug on a log.

In northern Italy, the brown marmorated stink bug, Halyomorpha halys, is an agricultural pest. A pest monitoring system was developed to engage citizens in the documentation of the brown marmorated stink bug through an app called "BugMap." Researchers were then able to identify areas most threatened by the pest through the large number of submitted citizen reports. Although the "BugMap" was user-friendly, not all geographic areas had access to mobile apps and internet connectivity, posing a limitation for web-based approaches. In another example, the documentation of invasive plant species relies on photo recognition that can produce inaccurate results when there is a lack of internet connectivity.

=== Climate adaptation ===
Extreme climate events have increased the need for crop variety in order to sustain current food systems. Crop variety testing, also known as the tricot approach, involves the observation of three different crop varieties, fertilizer types, or a combination of both to evaluate which options work best. The tricot approach recognizes that there are gender inequalities in agricultural production and attempts to involve more women in the process. This approach has shown to be successful as it engages both researchers and farmers to find solutions that are specific to various environmental areas and needs. The tricot approach was employed on multiple plots in Nicaragua, Ethiopia, and India with farmers as citizen scientists. Each country analyzed climate effects on different seed varieties allowing them to adjust in the next planting cycle. This iterative process documented the replacement of seed varieties for climate adaptation allowing results to be replicated and scalable.

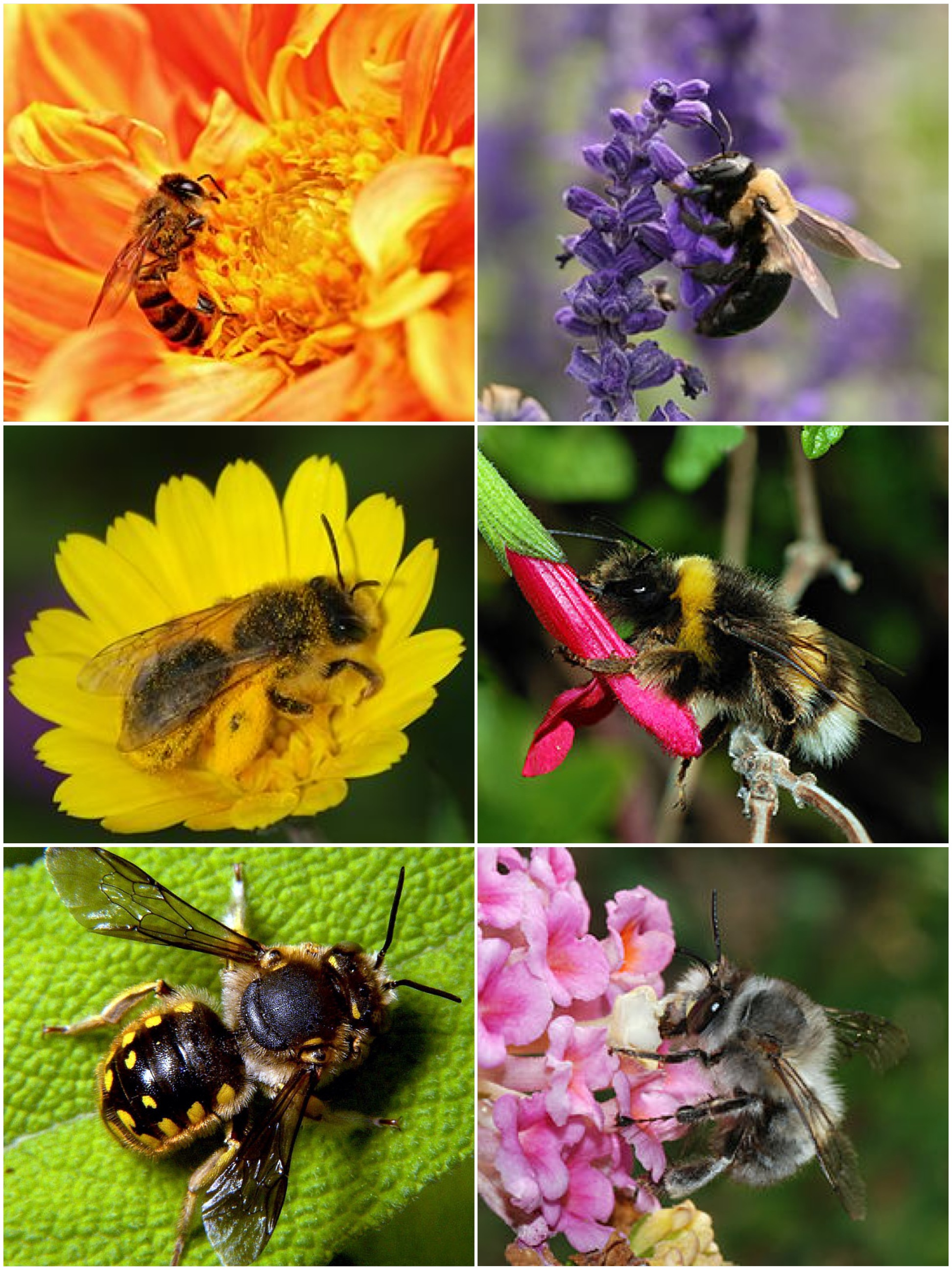
Collection of various bees. Citizen scientists collect data on bee morphospecies.

=== Pollination ===
Pollinators are an important aspect of human survival as many fruits, vegetables, and plants require cross pollination for reproduction. In urban areas pollinators face habitat loss as their natural environments are disrupted by human populations. A citizen science project, called Native Bee Watch, began in urban Colorado as a way to collect data on bee morphospecies. Both citizen scientists and researchers collected comparable data that is being used as a conservation tool for bee habitats.

== Limitations ==
There are a few challenges in integrating citizen science with sustainable agriculture. Many agriculture and food-related topics, such as nutrition, have no notable citizen science participation or research. Citizen science also most often occurs at smaller scales and the local level, so its coverage varies significantly across disciplines, geographies, and socioeconomic groups.

Farmers with smaller farms cannot contribute in the same way those with larger farms might be able to, as they may lack the resources or time to participate. There are also challenges in sustaining people's participation. Farmers have to consider the trade-offs between spending more time working versus participating in citizen science, weighing immediate needs against potential large-scale benefits. These disparities are further exacerbated by the fact that academics or researchers often need highly regulated large-scale studies for more accurate and structured data, which might only be possible in cooperation with larger farms.

Citizen science often has unequal representation in terms of demographics. Those who participate are more likely to identify as white, male, and of higher socioeconomic status. Few citizen science projects have been completed in the Global South. These are often farming-dependent countries that are more vulnerable to environmental, social, or economic issues and could benefit from these projects. Citizen science projects should evaluate whether the diversity of participants represents the broader population and if there are barriers to participation specific to different subpopulations.

These limitations mean that the findings of citizen science work in sustainable agriculture may not be as easily aggregated to the regional or national level or applied to new or different contexts.
