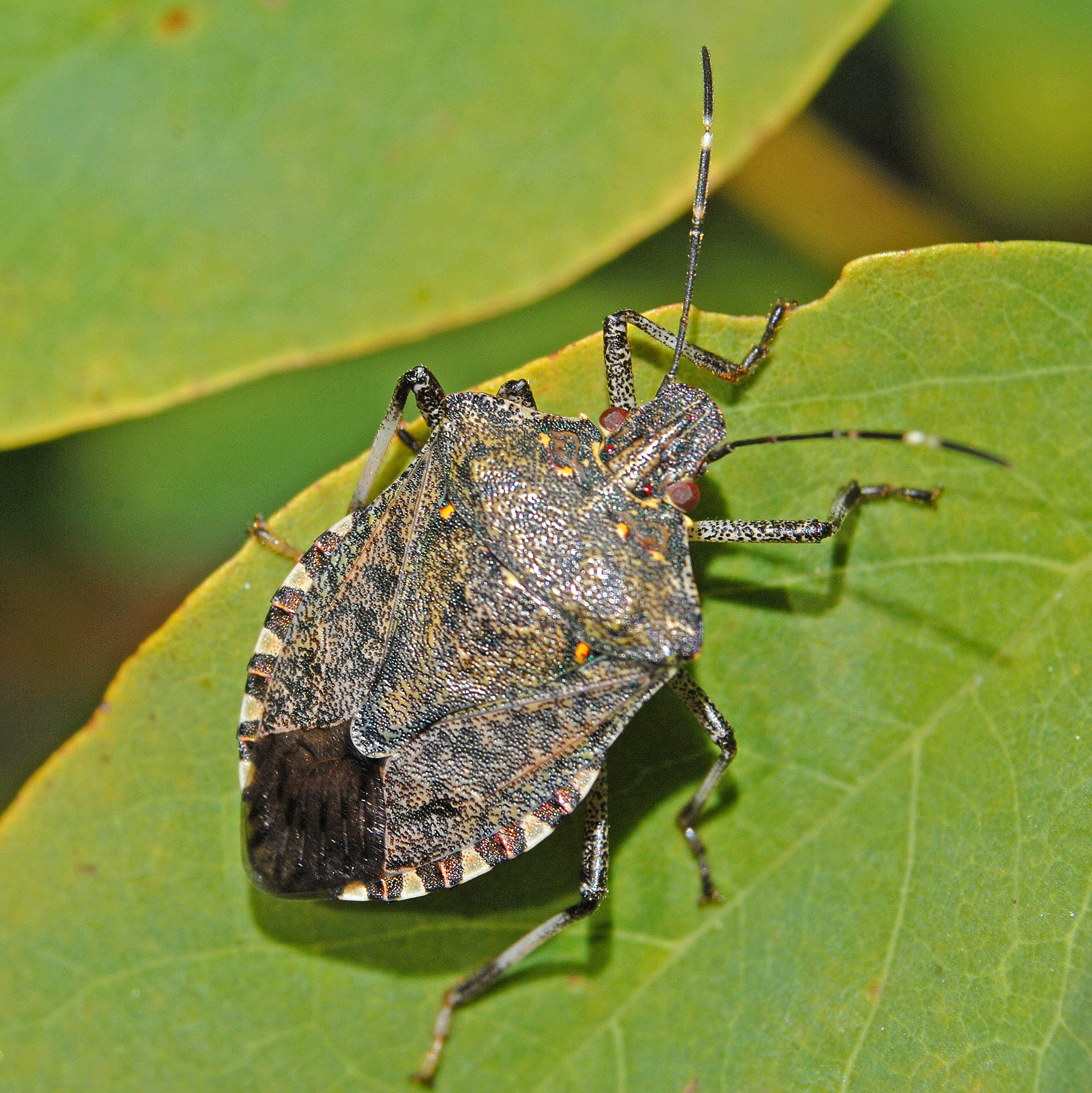
- Adult

Scientific classification
- Kingdom: Animalia
- Phylum: Arthropoda
- Clade: Pancrustacea
- Class: Insecta
- Order: Hemiptera
- Suborder: Heteroptera
- Family: Pentatomidae
- Genus: Halyomorpha
- Species: H. halys

Binomial name
- Halyomorpha halys Stål, 1855

= Brown marmorated stink bug =

Species of Pentatomid insect

The brown marmorated stink bug (Halyomorpha halys) is an insect in the family Pentatomidae, native to China, Japan, Korea, and other Asian regions. In September 1998, it was collected in Allentown, Pennsylvania, where it is believed to have been accidentally introduced. The nymphs and adults of the brown marmorated stink bug feed on over 100 species of plants, including many agricultural crops, and by 2010–11 had become a season-long pest in orchards in the Eastern United States. In 2010, in the Mid-Atlantic United States, $37 million in apple crops were lost, and some stone fruit growers lost more than 90% of their crops. Since the 2010s, the bug has spread to countries such as Georgia and Turkey and caused extensive damage to hazelnut production. It is now established in many parts of North America and has recently become established in Europe and South America.

== Description ==
Adult brown marmorated stink bugs are approximately 1.7 cm (0.67 in) long and about as wide, forming the shield shape characteristic of bugs in the superfamily Pentatomoidea. They are generally dark brown when viewed from above, with a creamy white-brown underside. Individual coloration may vary, with some bugs being various shades of red, grey, light brown, copper, or black. The term "marmorated" means variegated or veined, like marble, which refers to the markings of this species, including alternating light-colored bands on the antennae and alternating dark bands on the thin outer edge of the abdomen. The legs are brown with faint white mottling or banding.

The nymph stages are black or very dark brown, with red integument between the sclerites. First instar nymphs have no white markings, but second through fifth instar nymphs have black antennae with a single white band. The legs of nymphs are black with varying amounts of white banding. Freshly molted individuals of all stages are pale white with red markings. Eggs are normally laid on the underside of leaves in masses of 28 eggs, and are light green when laid, gradually turning white.

As in all stink bugs, the glands that produce the defensive chemicals (the smell) are located on the underside of the thorax, between the first and second pair of legs.

== Behavior ==
A brown marmorated stink bug on a tomato fruit

The stink bug can emit an odor through holes in its thorax as a defense mechanism against being eaten by predators. However, simply handling the bug, injuring it, or attempting to move it can trigger it to release the odor. The odor is due to trans-2-decenal and trans-2-octenal. The smell has been characterized as a "pungent odor that smells like cilantro".

Reports on human cases are rare; the stink bug's body fluids are toxic and irritating to human skin and eyes. One case of keratitis has been reported in Taiwan.

=== Mating ===
During courtship, the male emits pheromones and vibrational signals to communicate with a female, who replies with her own vibrational signals, as in all stink bugs. The insects use the signals to recognize and locate each other. Vibrational signals of this species are noted for their low frequency, and one male signal type is much longer than any other previously described signals in stink bugs, although the significance of this is not yet clear.

=== Diet ===
The brown marmorated stink bug is a sap-sucking insect (like all Hemiptera or "true bugs") that uses its proboscis to pierce the host plant to feed. This feeding results, in part, in the formation of dimpled or necrotic areas on the outer surface of fruits, leaf stippling, seed loss, and possible transmission of plant pathogens. It is an agricultural pest that can cause widespread damage to fruit and vegetable crops. In Japan, it is a pest to soybean and fruit crops. In the U.S., the brown marmorated stink bug feeds, beginning in late May or early June, on a wide range of fruits, vegetables, and other host plants, including peaches, apples, green beans, soybeans, cherries, raspberries, and pears.

== In North America ==
Brown marmorated stink bug (Halyomorpha halys) U.S. distribution from 2000 to 2019

The brown marmorated stink bug was accidentally introduced into the United States from China or Japan. It is believed to have hitched a ride as a stowaway in packing crates or on various types of machinery. The first documented specimen was collected in Allentown, Pennsylvania, in September 1998.

Several Muhlenberg College students were reported to have seen these bugs as early as August of that same year. Between 2001 and 2010, 54 sightings were reported of these bugs at shipping ports in the United States. However, stink bugs are not listed as reportable, and no action is required to remove the insect. This allowed the insect to enter the United States relatively easily, as it can survive long periods in hot or cold conditions.

Other reports have the brown marmorated stink bug documented as early as 2000 in New Jersey from a blacklight trap run by the Rutgers Cooperative Extension Vegetable Integrated Pest Management program in Milford, New Jersey.

In 2002, in New Jersey, it was found on plant material in Stewartsville and was collected from blacklight traps in Phillipsburg and Little York. It was quickly documented and established in many counties in Pennsylvania, New Jersey, Delaware, Connecticut, and New York on the eastern coast of the United States.

By 2009, this agricultural pest had reached Maryland, West Virginia, Virginia, Tennessee, North Carolina, Kentucky, Ohio, Illinois, and Oregon. In 2010 it was found in Indiana, Michigan, Minnesota, and other states.

As of November 2011, it had spread to 34 U.S. states and by 2012 to 40, and showed an increase of 60% in total numbers over 2011.

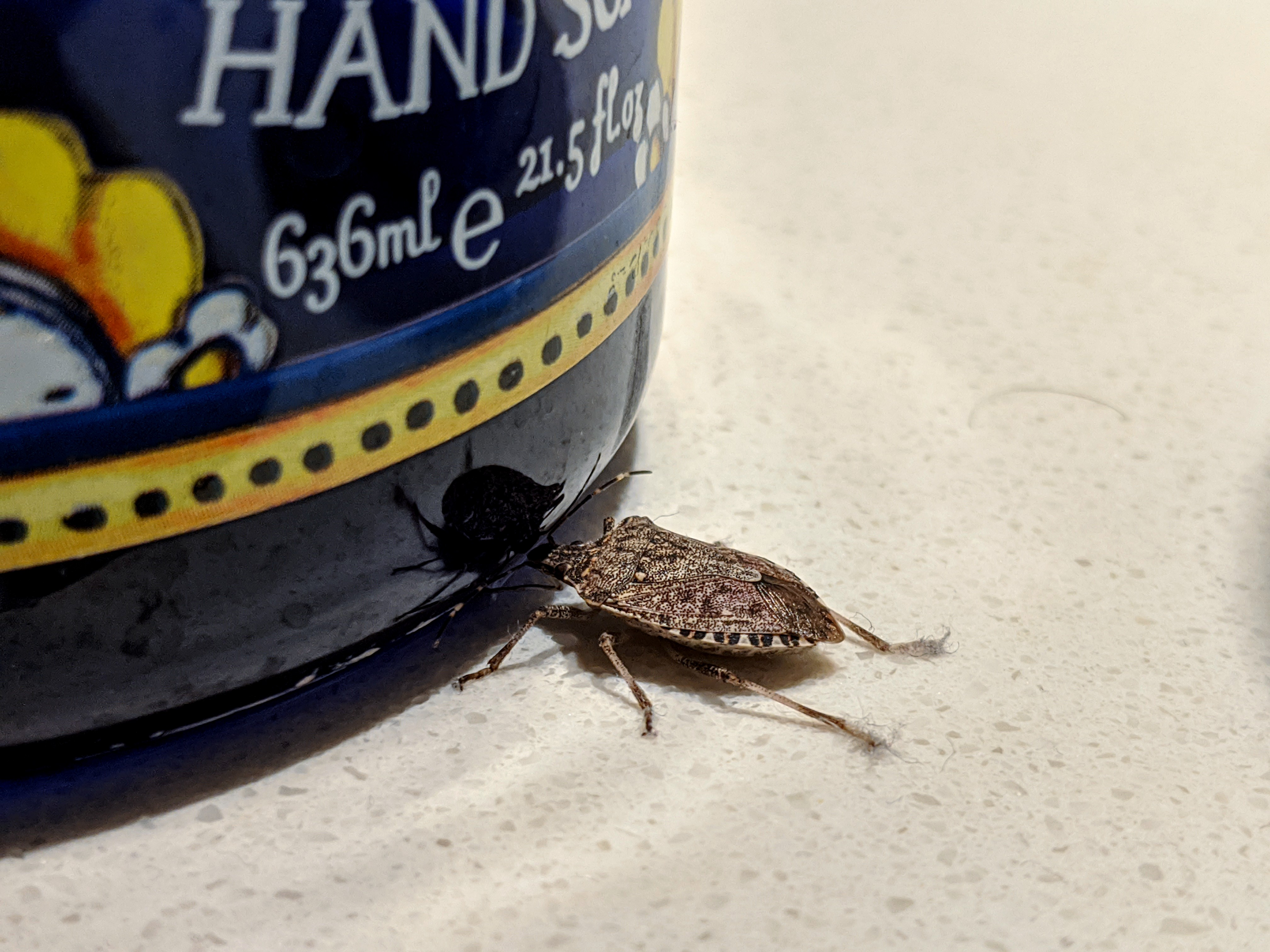
Stink bug in a washroom in Toronto in 2020

Their populations have also spread to southern Ontario and Quebec, Canada. They have recently been found in southern British Columbia and southern Alberta.

=== Population increase ===
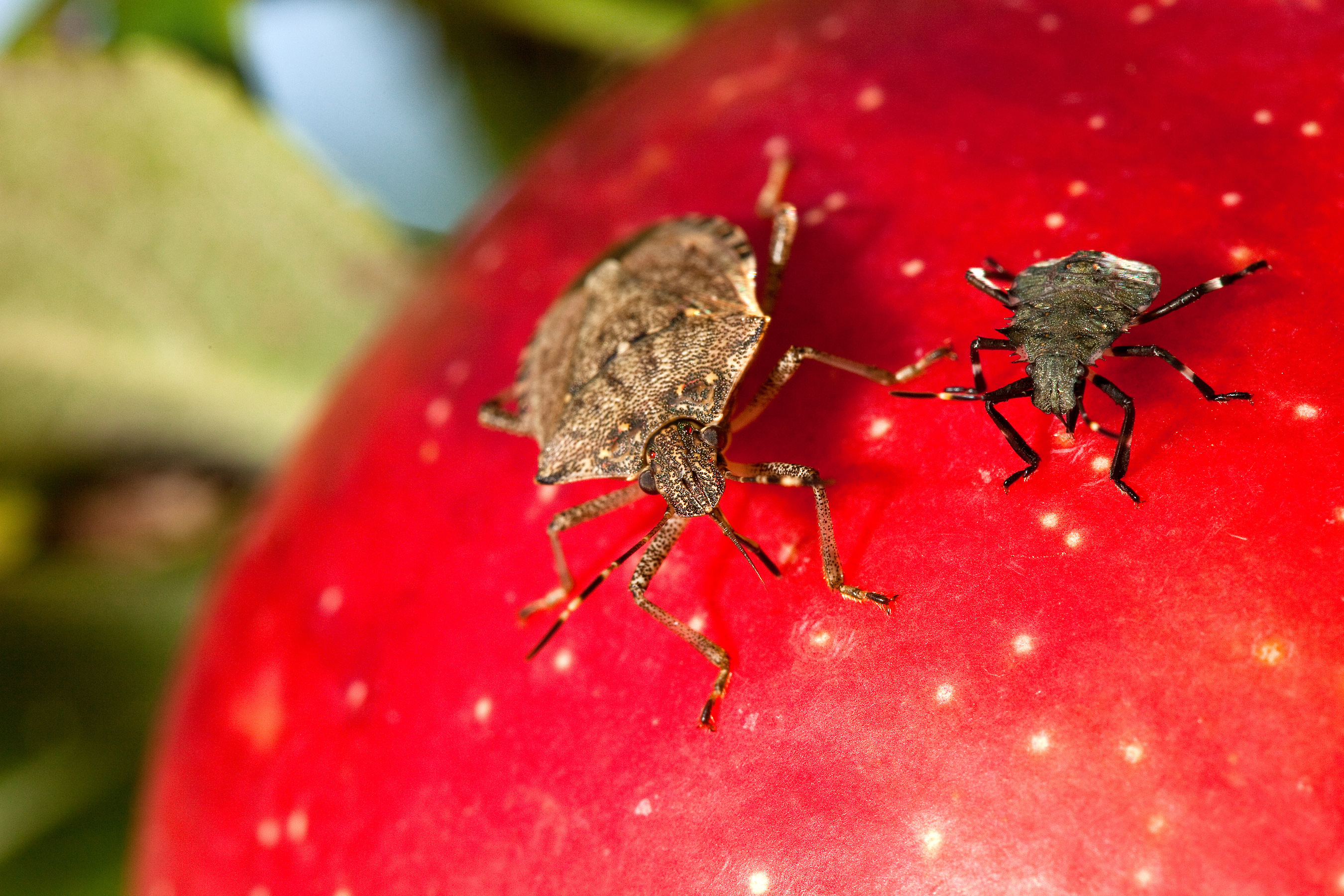
Stink bugs feeding on an apple

As of 2010, 17 states had been categorized as having established populations, and several other states along the eastern half of the United States were reported as having more than normal numbers of stink bugs.

Stink bug populations rise because the climate in the United States is ideal for their reproduction. In optimal conditions, an adult stink bug can develop within 35 to 45 days after hatching. Female stink bugs can lay 400 eggs in their lifetimes. The bug can also produce at least one successful generation per year in all areas of the United States, no matter the climate. In warmer climates, multiple generations can occur annually, which can range from two generations in states such as Virginia to six generations in California, Arizona, Florida, Louisiana, Georgia, and Texas.

The addition of two more generations allowed the population to explode, leading to the establishment of several other populations in neighboring states. Currently, no environmental limiting factors are apparently slowing their distribution across North America. They are also extremely mobile insects, capable of moving from host to host without causing disruption in their reproductive processes. Currently, populations are estimated to continue to grow and spread to other states and provinces, especially during unusual periods of warm weather.

=== Agricultural effects ===
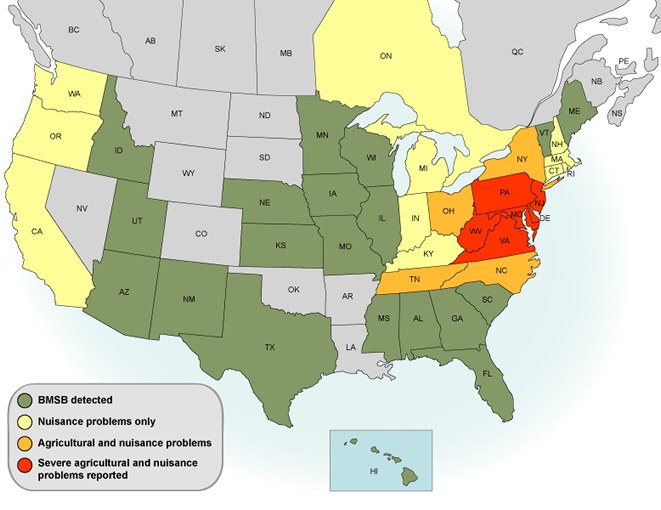
Effects of the brown marmorated stink bug (May 2013)

The brown marmorated stink bug is a serious agricultural pest that has been readily causing damage to crops across the Eastern United States. They feed on an array of plants, including apples, apricots, Asian pears, cherries, corn, grapes, lima beans, peaches, peppers, tomatoes, and soybeans. This makes them extremely versatile, as they do not require a specific plant on which to feed. To obtain their food, stink bugs use their stylets to pierce the plant tissue to extract the plant fluids.

In doing so, the plant loses necessary fluids, which can lead to deformation of seeds, destruction of seeds, destruction of fruiting structures, delayed plant maturation, and increased vulnerability to harmful pathogens. While harvesting the plant's juices, the stink bug injects saliva into the plant, creating a dimpling of the fruit's surface and rotting of the material underneath.

The most common signs of stink bug damage are pitting and scarring of the fruit, leaf destruction, and a mealy texture to the harvested fruits and vegetables. Most times, the signs of stink bug damage make the plant unsuitable for sale in the market, as the insides are usually rotten. In field crops such as corn and soybeans, the damage may not be as evident as the damage seen in fruit plants. When stink bugs feed on corn, they go through the husk before eating the kernels, hiding the damage until the husks are removed during harvesting. The same damage is seen in soybeans, as the stink bug goes through the seed pods to acquire the juices of the seeds. One visual cue of stink bug damage to soybean crops is the "stay green" effect, where damaged soybean plants stay green late into the season, while other plants in the field die off normally. One can usually tell that a field of crops is infected because stink bugs are known for the "edge effect", in which they tend to infest crops from the edges of the field first, typically 30-40 ft.

=== Control ===
Control of stink bugs is a priority of the United States Department of Agriculture, which has developed an artificial pheromone that can bait traps. Because the bugs insert their probosces below the surface of fruit and then feed, some insecticides are ineffective; in addition, the bugs are mobile, and a new population may fly in after the resident population has been killed, making permanent removal nearly impossible. With soybean infestations, spraying only the perimeter of a field may be the most effective method of preventing stink bugs from damaging the crops. However, even this method is limited, as new populations move back into the area, or the existing population simply moves to unaffected areas. Evidence also shows that stink bugs are developing resistance to pyrethroid insecticides, a common chemical used to combat infestations.

Other insecticides currently in field trials that are showing promising results are oxamyl (96% mortality rate) and moribund (67% mortality rate). Many other commonly used insecticides are merely used to keep these insects out of fields, rather than actually killing them. The most successful method of protecting apples found thus far is the use of kaolin clay. As of 2012, native predators such as wasps and birds were showing increased signs of feeding on the bugs as they adapted to the new food source. Managing this pest species is challenging because few effective pesticides are labeled for use against them.

=== Similarity in appearance to native species ===
Easily confused with Brochymena and Euschistus, the best identification for adults is the white band on the antennae. It is similar in appearance to other native species of shield bug, including Acrosternum, Euschistus, and Podisus, except that several of the abdominal segments protrude from beneath the wings and are alternatively banded with black and white (visible along the edge of the bug even when wings are folded) and a white stripe or band on the next to last (fourth) antennal segment. The adult rice stink bug (Oebalus pugnax) is distinguishable from the brown marmorated stink bug by noting the straw color, the smaller size, and the elongated shape of the rice stink bug.

== In Europe ==
The brown marmorated stink bug was likely first introduced to Europe during the repair work of the Chinese Garden in Zürich, Switzerland, in the winter of 1998. The stink bug has been traced back to have traveled with roof tiles that were imported from Beijing, China.

The bug has since spread rapidly through Europe. The first sighting in southern Germany was made in Konstanz in 2011. In Italy the first specimens were found in Modena in 2012 and afterwards in South Tirol in 2016. The bug has also been sighted in Vienna, Austria, with increasing reports after 2016. The Italian region of Friuli-Venezia Giulia announced from 2017 to distribute 3.5 million euros to offset the costs of the lost crops of the fruit farmers until 2020. H. halys was first found in Portugal in Pombal in late 2018 or early 2019 - a few live specimens were found in agricultural equipment being imported from Italy. However the Portuguese National Authority for Animal Health regards this as a transitory interception. In 2019, there may have been another sighting somewhere in Portugal. In 2018 arrived in the Basque Country, where the population grew rapidly by October 2023. Only in 2020 was H. halys confirmed to be reproducing and overwintering in the country. In March 2021, it was confirmed to have arrived in the UK.

=== Spread from Russia to Georgia ===
The stink bug was traced to have been introduced to the Greater Caucasus area during the construction works of the 2014 Winter Olympics in Sochi, Russia, where it was most likely imported with decorative building elements brought from Italy. The stink bug has since spread to Georgia, where it continues to cause major damage to the local crops.

From 2016 to 2018, the bug was estimated to have destroyed one-third of Georgia's hazelnut harvest, with yearly damages of up to €60 million (~179,000,000 in 2018 lari). Georgia is the fifth-largest producer of hazelnuts in the world, with yearly production valued at US$179.5 million in 2016. In 2018 the Georgian government allocated 4 million ($1.6 million) and the United States Agency for International Development (USAID) 8 million ($3.2 million) to help combat the spread of the brown marmorated stink bug in Georgia, but so far the efforts have been criticized as being insufficient.

=== Spread to Turkey ===
The stink bug was first reported in Levent district of Istanbul in Turkey in September 2017. In October of the same year, it was observed in Artvin Province and the species has rapidly spread to other areas in Eastern Black Sea Region. In 2018, it was reported in Sakarya's Hendek district, and as of January 2020; it is present in 8 provinces and 46 districts all across Turkey, with Artvin, Rize, Trabzon, Giresun, Samsun, and Yalova provinces being the most effected. The bug is believed to have entered the country through Georgia, as it was initially reported in Kemalpaşa, Artvin, just a few kilometers away from the border between both countries.

Since Turkey is the biggest hazelnut producer in the world, the bug has caused extensive damage to hazelnut agriculture. The damage to the hazelnut industry in Turkey has been estimated to be US$200 million in 2017, US$300 million in 2018 and is mainly attributed to the brown marmorated stink bug, green stink bug and powdery mildew. Celal Tuncer, a professor from Ondokuz Mayıs University, has stated that the bug has already caused a 20% drop in Artvin's hazelnut yield and is expected to cause a 50% drop in hazelnut production and quality in the future. According to Tuncer, these drops would lead to US$1 billion in damages to hazelnut producers.

== Predators ==
In China, Trissolcus japonicus, a parasitoid wasp species in the family Scelionidae, is a primary predator.

In the United States, Europe, and New Zealand, Trissolcus japonicus is a focus of biological control programs against the brown marmorated stink bug. This wasp was under study in the United States since 2007 for biosafety of possible introduction. However, in 2014, two adventive populations were found in the United States during surveys to identify which North American parasitoids might attack brown marmorated stink bug.

Subsequent genetic testing showed these wild populations were self-introduced: they were not related to each other, or to a laboratory strain being studied in quarantine. Since then, several agricultural authorities have begun programs to augment wild populations with releases of laboratory-reared wasps. An adventive European population was discovered during similar surveys in Switzerland in 2017.

Several parasitoids and predators indigenous to North America and Europe have been reported to attack stink bug eggs, nymphs, and adults. Researchers have also experimented with other predators like the spotted lady beetle, the spined soldier bug, and the common green lacewing, whereby the latter consumed most of the eggs of these tested species. Other research investigated different spider species, as well as the wheel bug Arilus cristatus. Several spider species attacked both the eggs and adult stink bugs. The Joro spider, another invasive Asian species, was identified in Georgia in 2015 and is a natural predator of the stink bug. Pill bugs eat stink bug eggs. Arilus cristatus, however, was the most voracious predator and attacked the eggs and adults more consistently.

== Life cycle ==
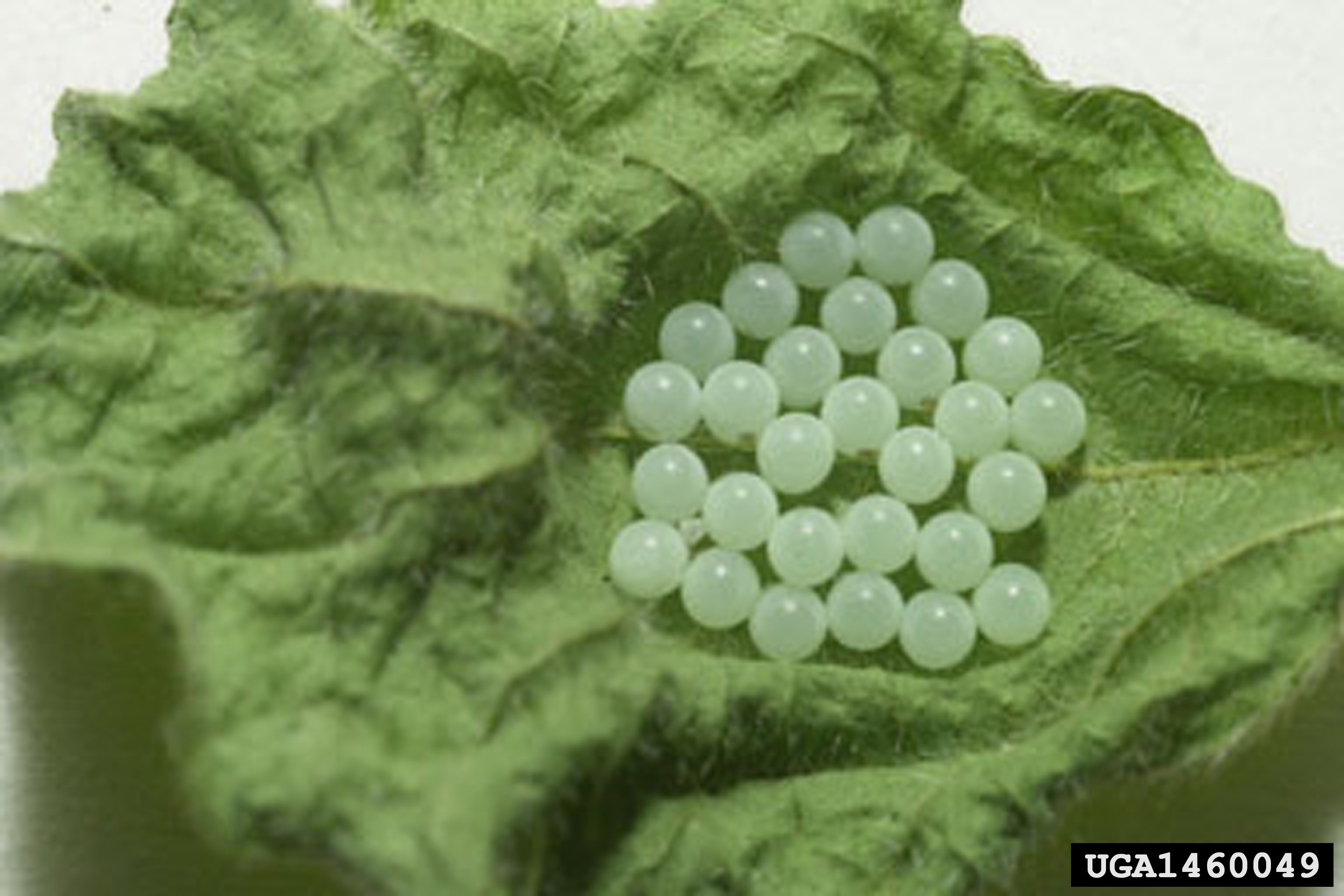
Eggs on leaf

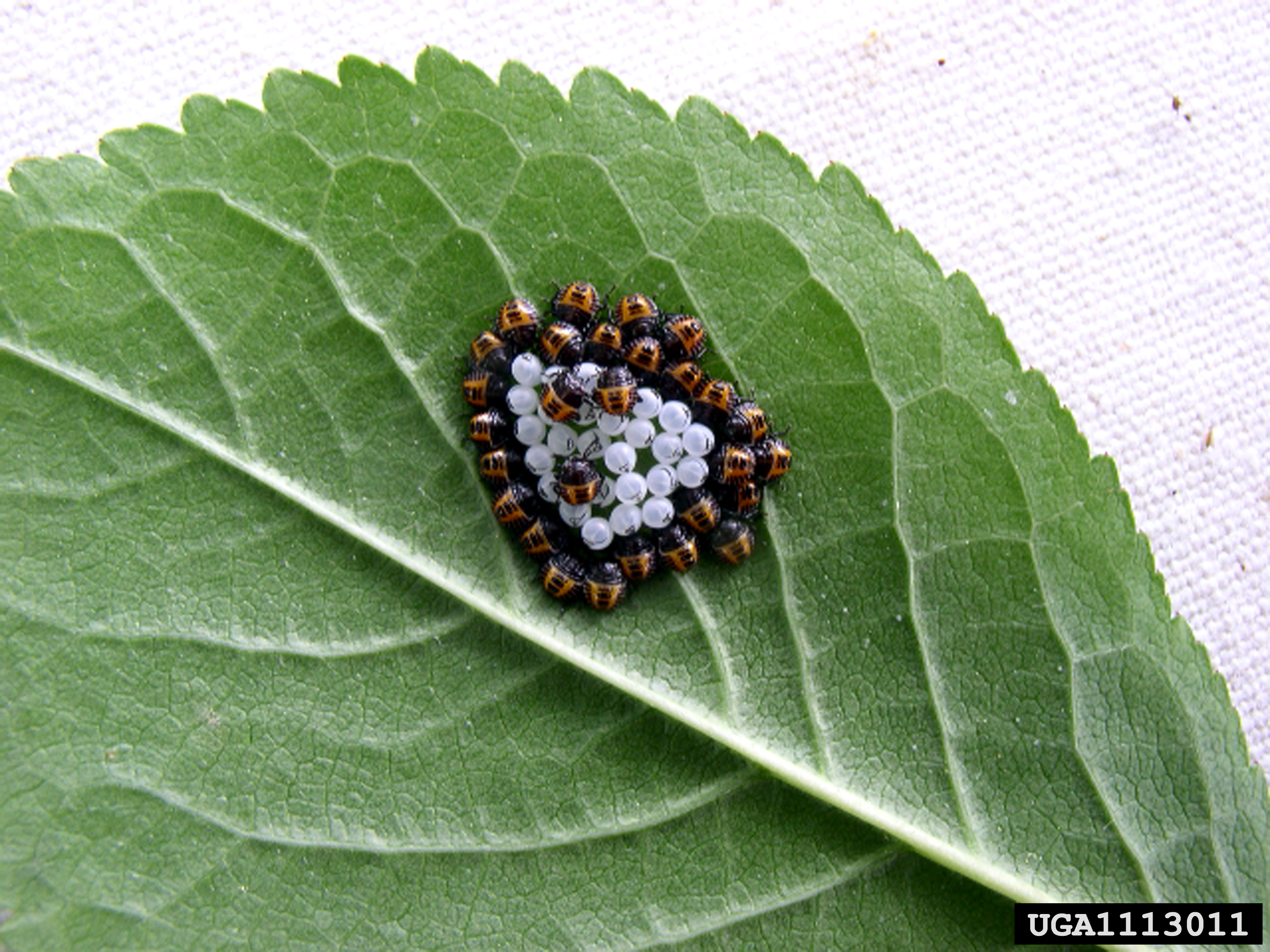
Newly hatched eggs

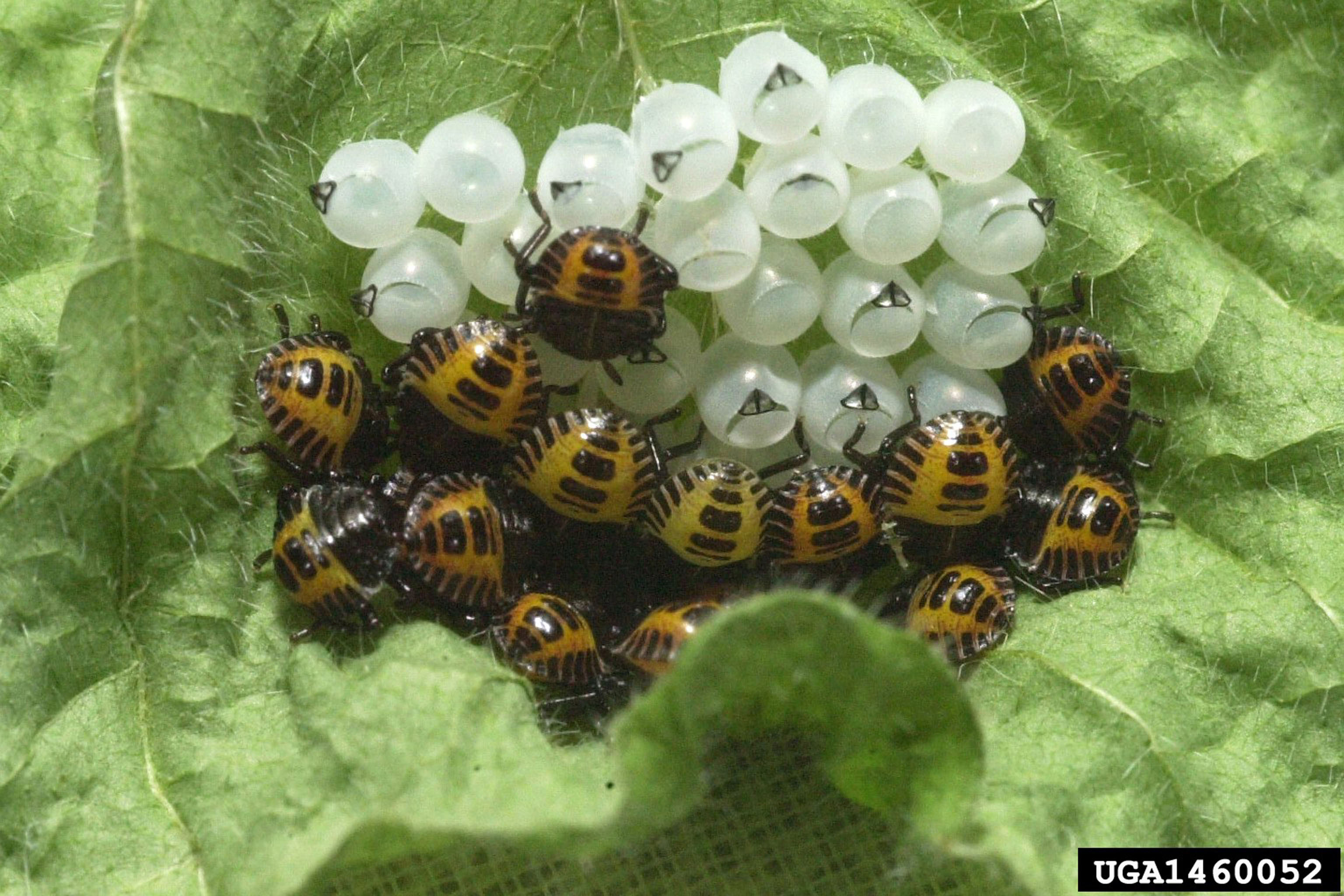
Newly hatched eggs

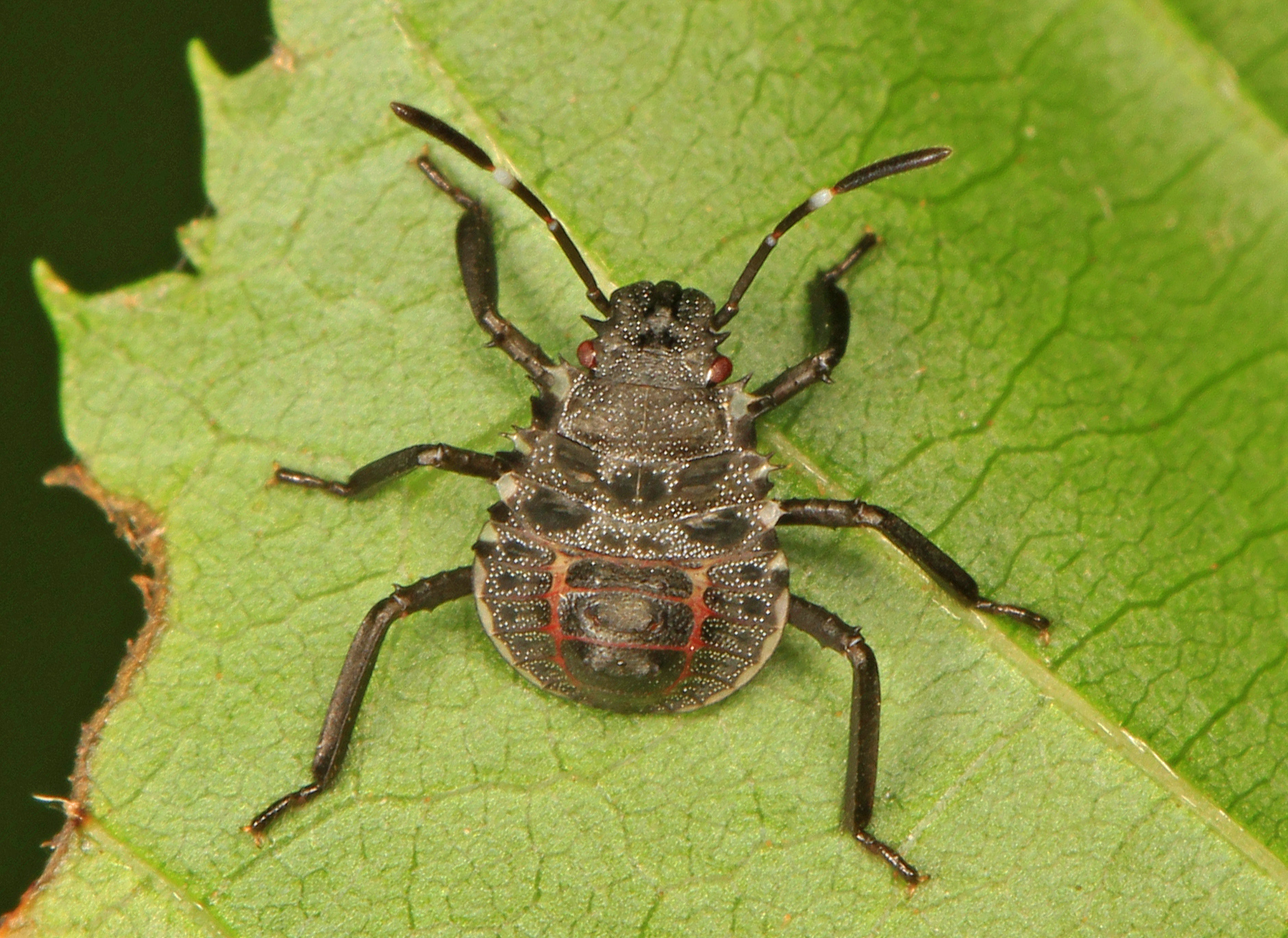
Nymph

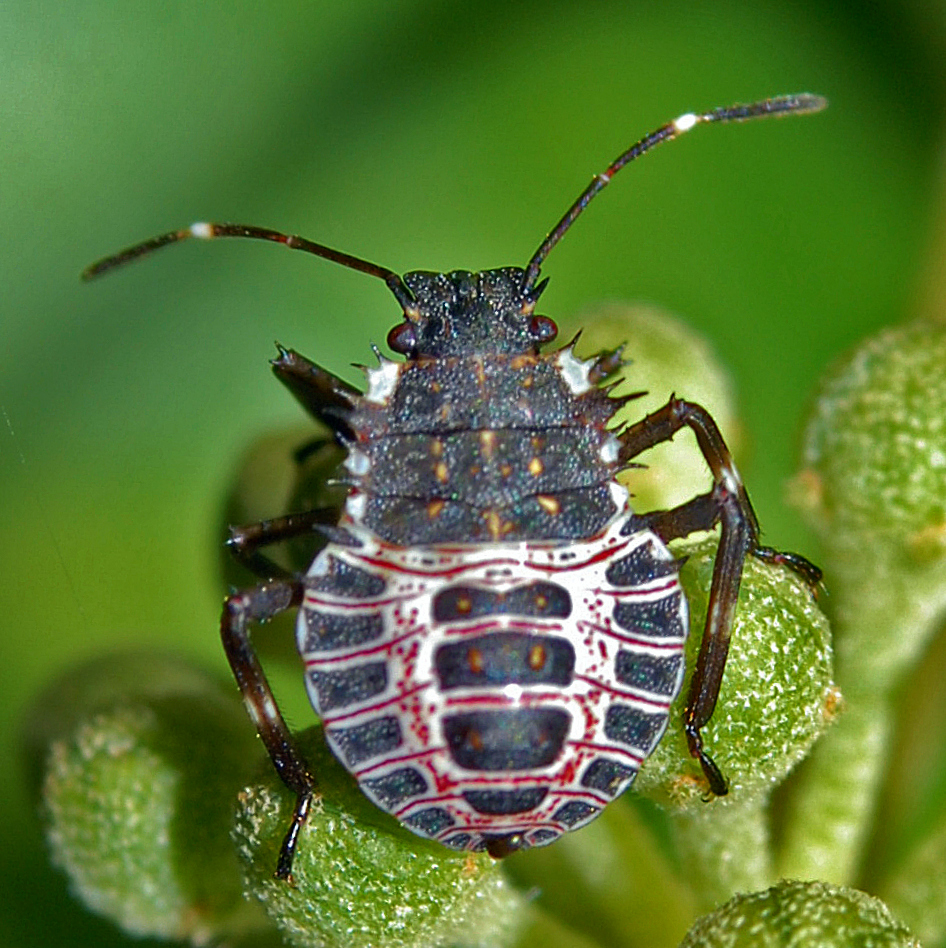
Third or fourth instar nymph

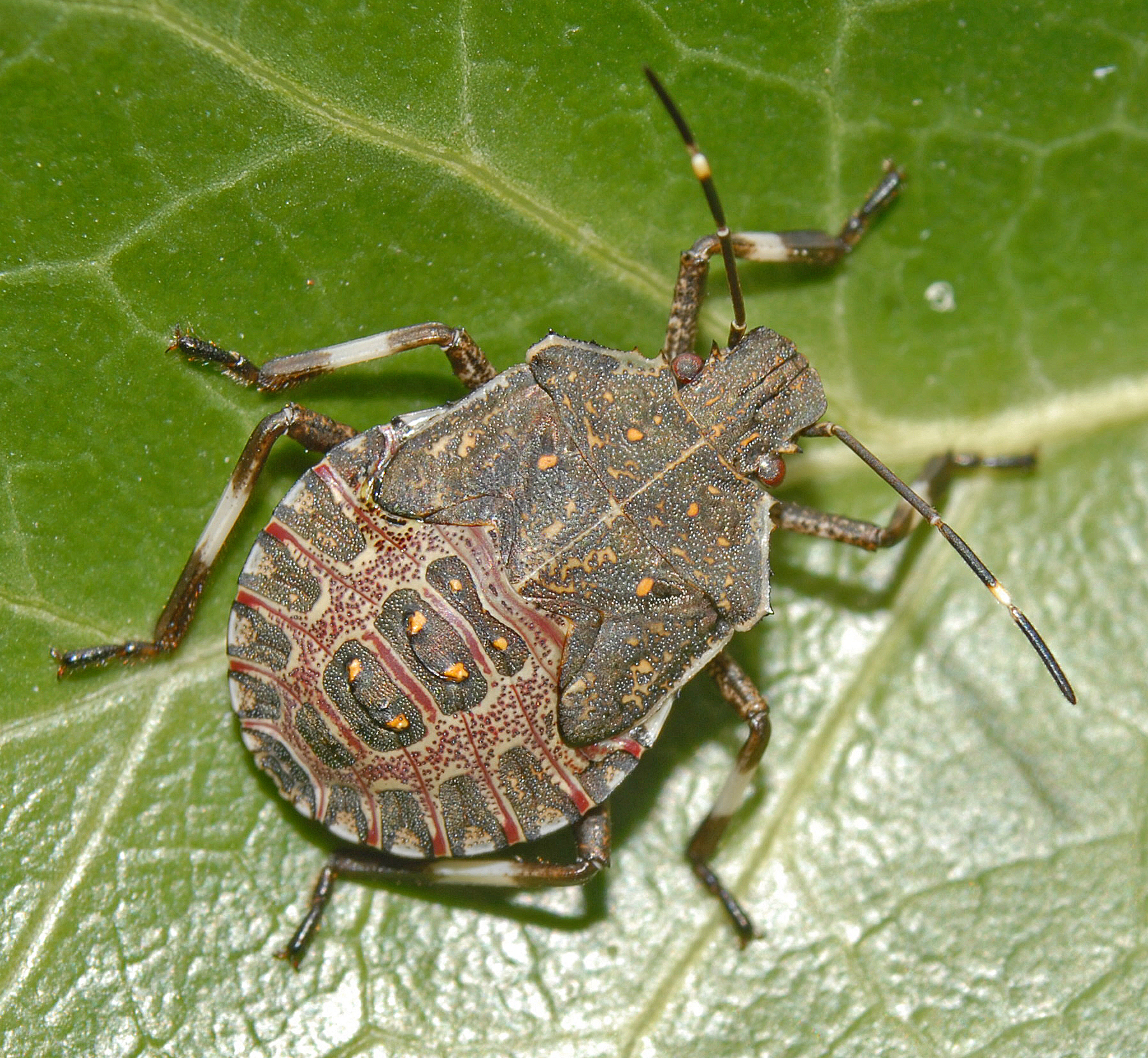
Fifth-instar nymph

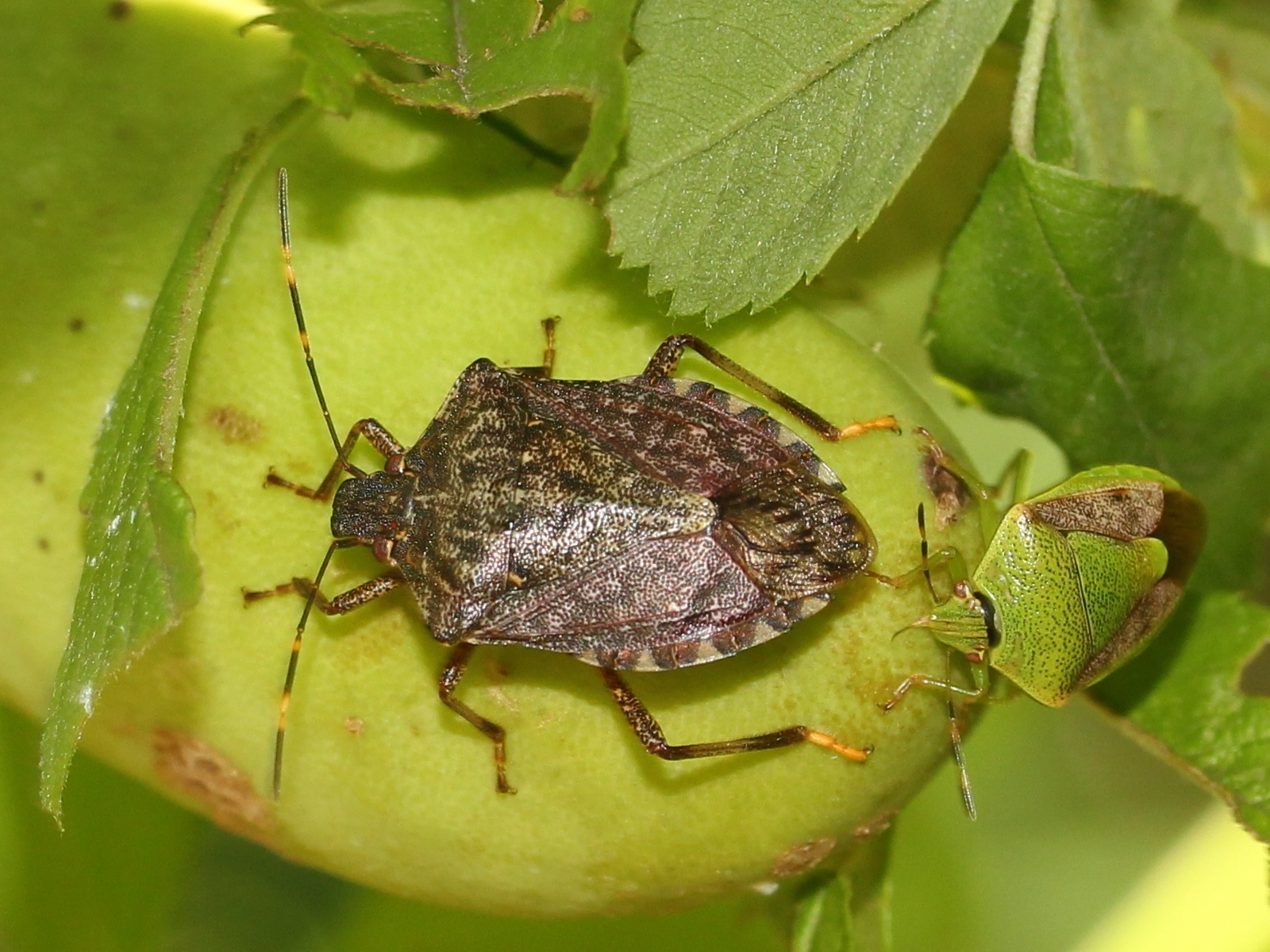
Adult

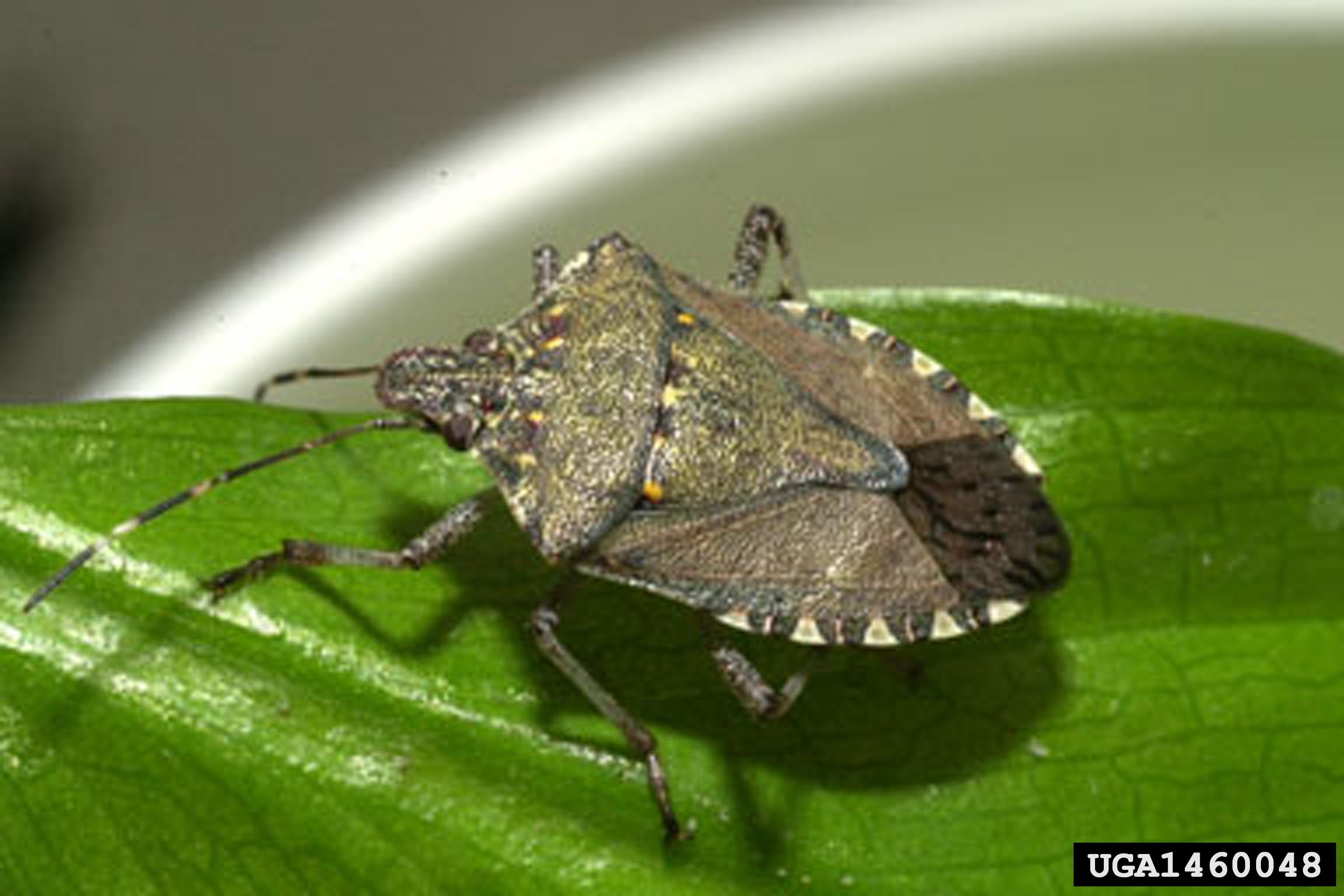
Adult

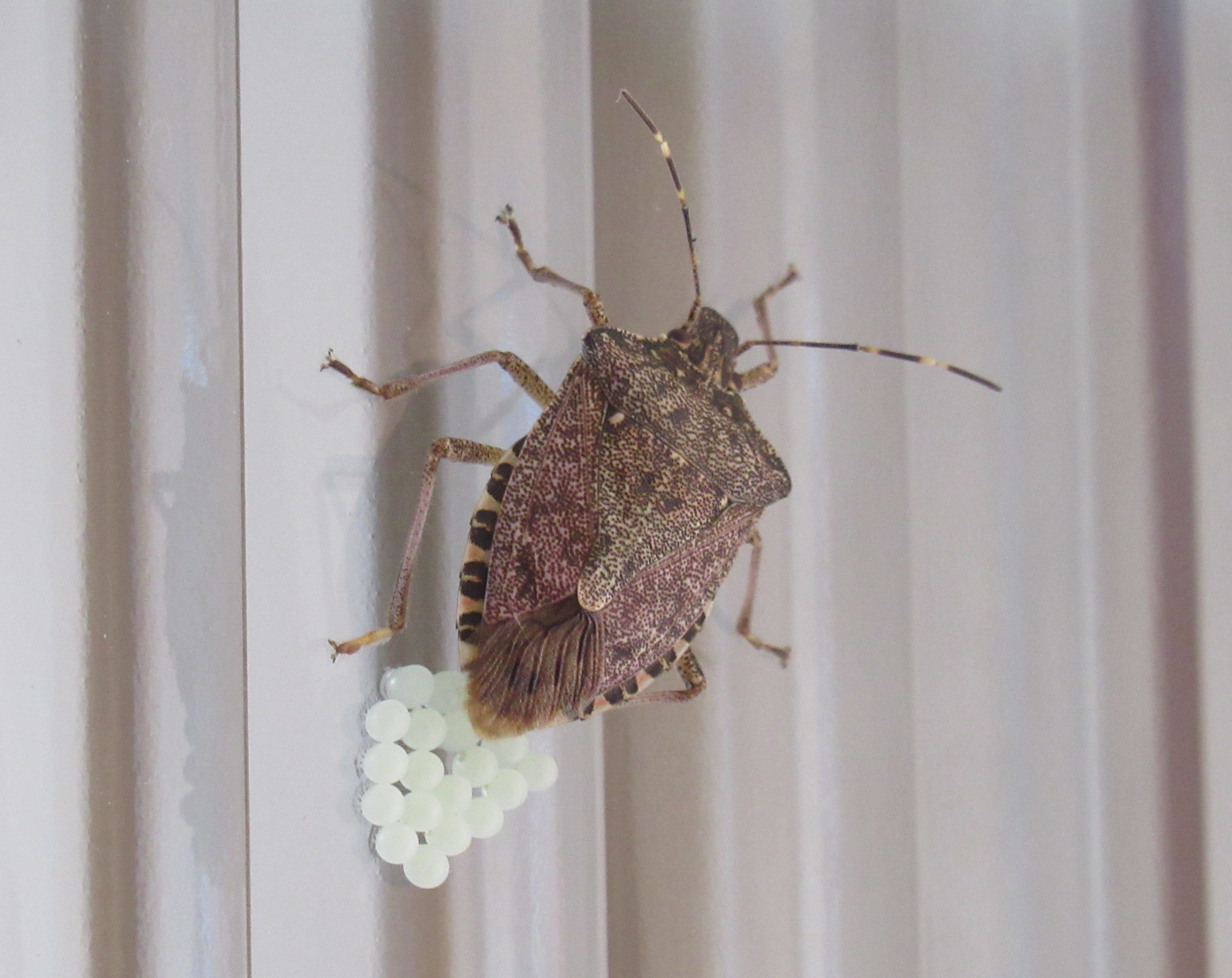
Laying eggs

== In houses and structures ==
The brown marmorated stink bug is more likely to invade homes in the fall than others in the family. The bug survives the winter as an adult by entering houses and structures when autumn evenings become colder, often in the thousands. In one home, more than 26,000 stink bugs were found overwintering. Adults can live from several months to a year.

They enter under siding, into soffits, around window and door frames, chimneys, or any space which has openings big enough to fit through. Once inside the house, they go into a state of hibernation. They wait for winter to pass, but often the warmth inside the house causes them to become active, and they may fly clumsily around light fixtures. Two important vectors of this pest are the landscape ornamentals tree of heaven and princess tree.

== See also ==
- Stink bug
- Drab stinkbug, Megymenum gracilicorne
- Acrosternum hilare, the green stink bug
- Megacopta cribraria, the kudzu bug
- Nezara viridula, the southern green stink bug
- Oebalus pugnax, the rice stink bug
