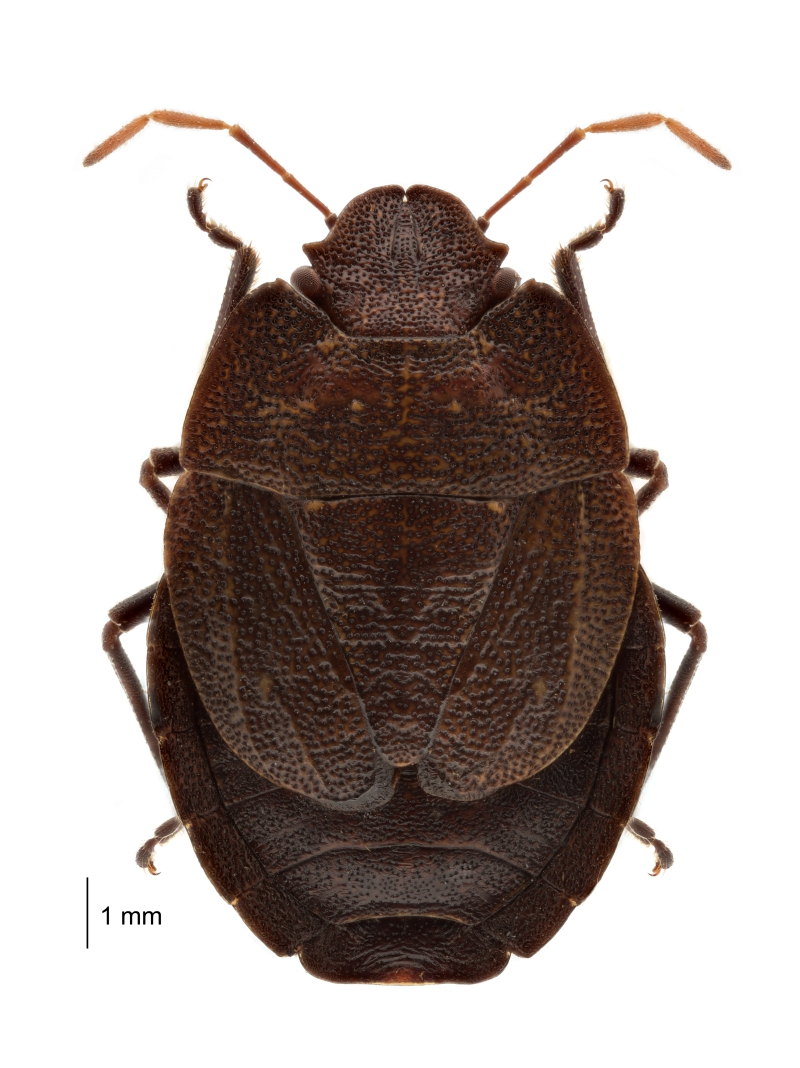
- Hypsithocus hudsonae

Scientific classification
- Kingdom: Animalia
- Phylum: Arthropoda
- Class: Insecta
- Order: Hemiptera
- Suborder: Heteroptera
- Family: Pentatomidae
- Genus: Hypsithocus; Bergroth, 1927

= Hypsithocus =

Genus of insects

Hypsithocus is a genus of true bugs belonging to the family Pentatomidae.

The species of this genus are found in New Zealand.

Species:

- Hypsithocus hudsonae
- Hypsithocus spec Bergroth, 1927
