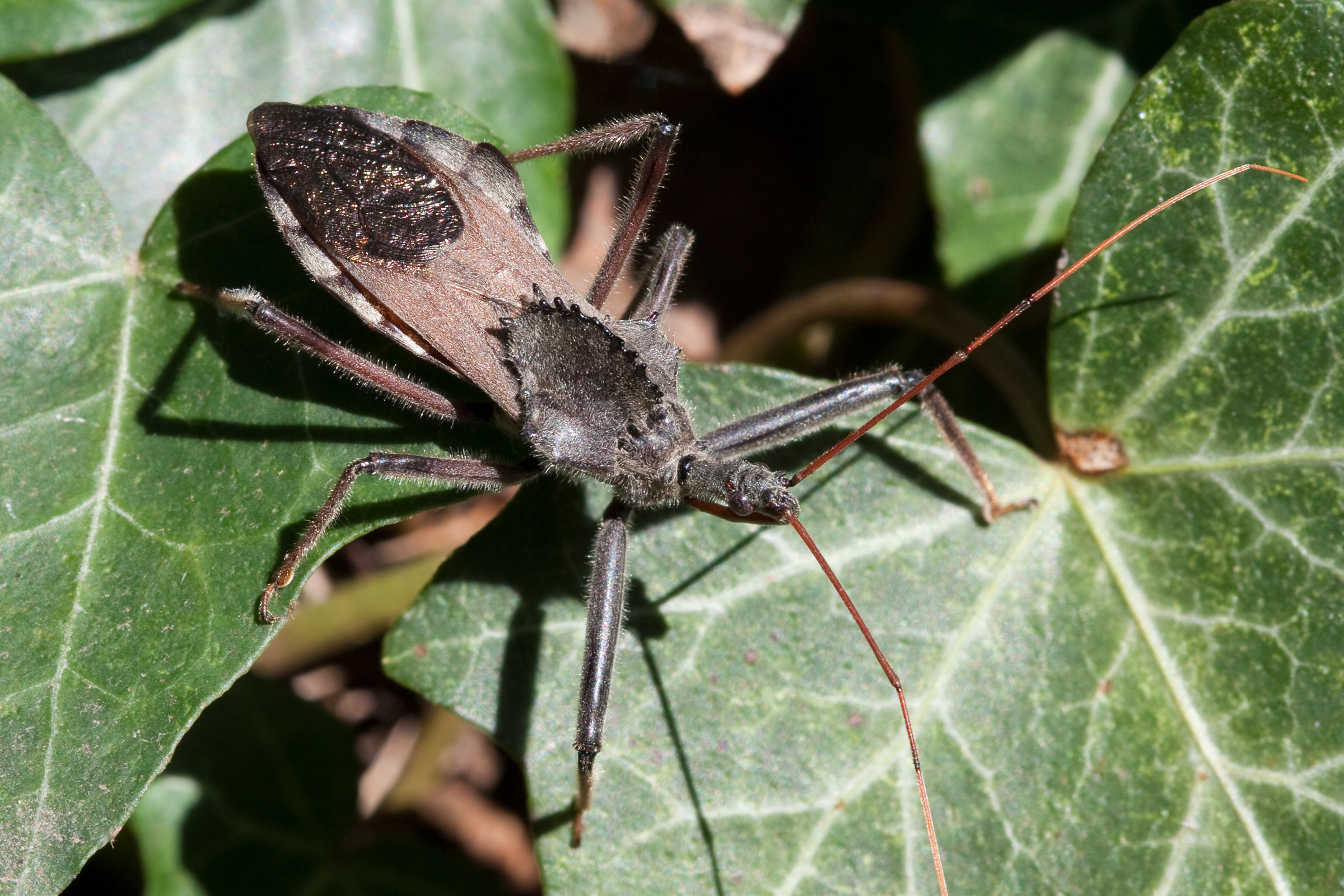
- Arilus cristatus

Scientific classification
- Kingdom: Animalia
- Phylum: Arthropoda
- Class: Insecta
- Order: Hemiptera
- Suborder: Heteroptera
- Family: Reduviidae
- Subfamily: Harpactorinae
- Tribe: Harpactorini
- Genus: Arilus; Hahn, 1831

= Arilus =

Genus of true bugs

Arilus, or wheel bugs due to the semicircular crest on the pronotum, is a genus of true bugs in the family Reduviidae, subfamily Harpactorinae and tribe Harpactorini. Most species are found in the Americas. Arilus is a generalist predator of insects.

See North American wheel bug for details about a representative species.

== Species ==
Five extant species plus one fossil species are included within this genus:

- Arilus carinatus (Forster, 1771)
- Arilus cristatus (Linnaeus, 1763) the North American wheel bug
- Arilus depressicollis (Stål, 1859)
- †Arilus faujasi Riou, 1999
- Arilus gallus (Stål, 1872)
- Arilus nigriceps Herrich-Schaeffer, 1848

Three additional species originally described in the genus are currently incertae sedis.

- Arilus auctus Germar, 1837
- Arilus collaris Herrich-Schaeffer, 1848
- Arilus spiniceps Blanchard, 1843
