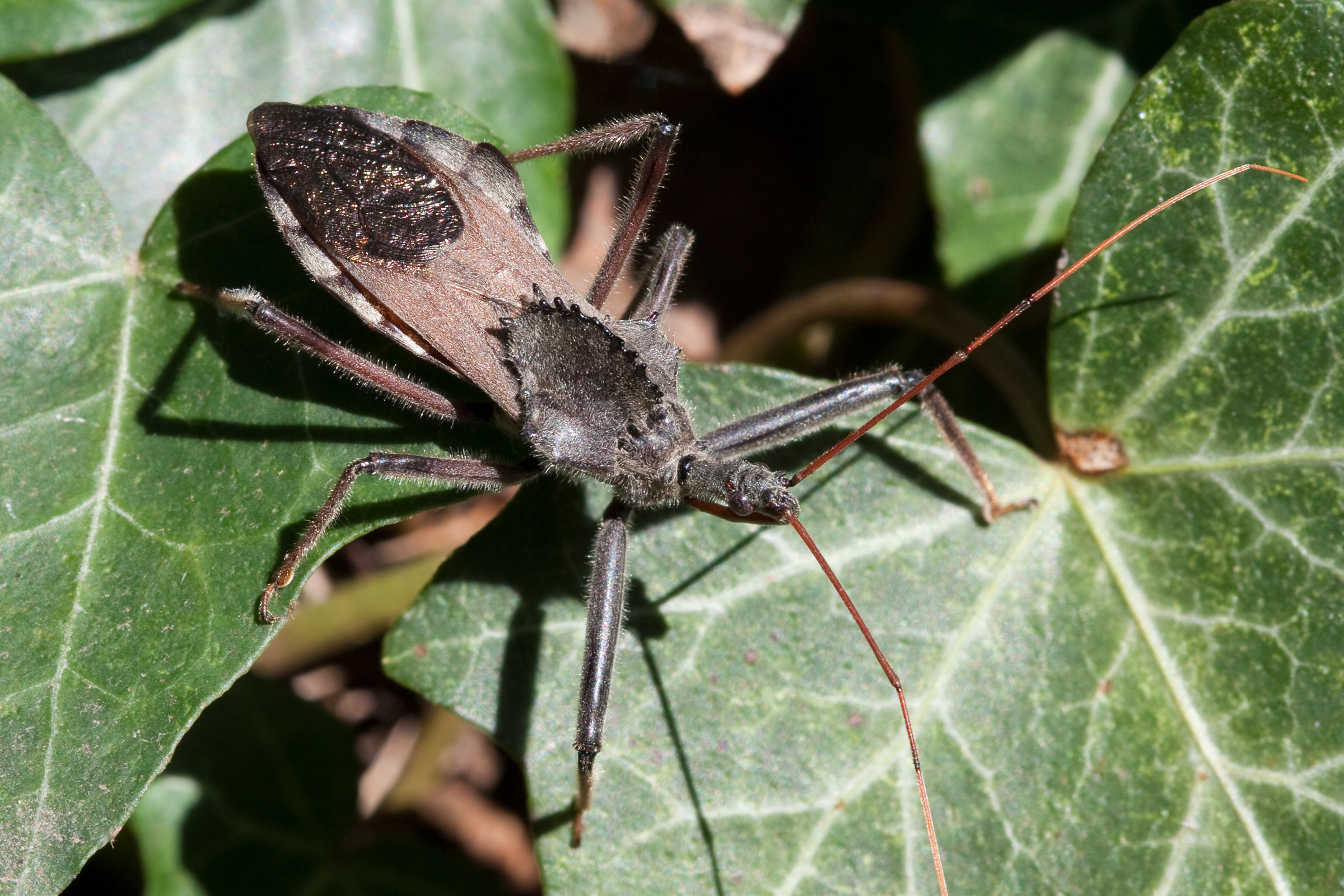

Scientific classification
- Kingdom: Animalia
- Phylum: Arthropoda
- Clade: Pancrustacea
- Class: Insecta
- Order: Hemiptera
- Suborder: Heteroptera
- Family: Reduviidae
- Subfamily: Harpactorinae
- Tribe: Harpactorini
- Genus: Arilus
- Species: A. cristatus

Binomial name
- Arilus cristatus (Linnaeus, 1763)

= Arilus cristatus =

North American wheel bug

Species of true bug

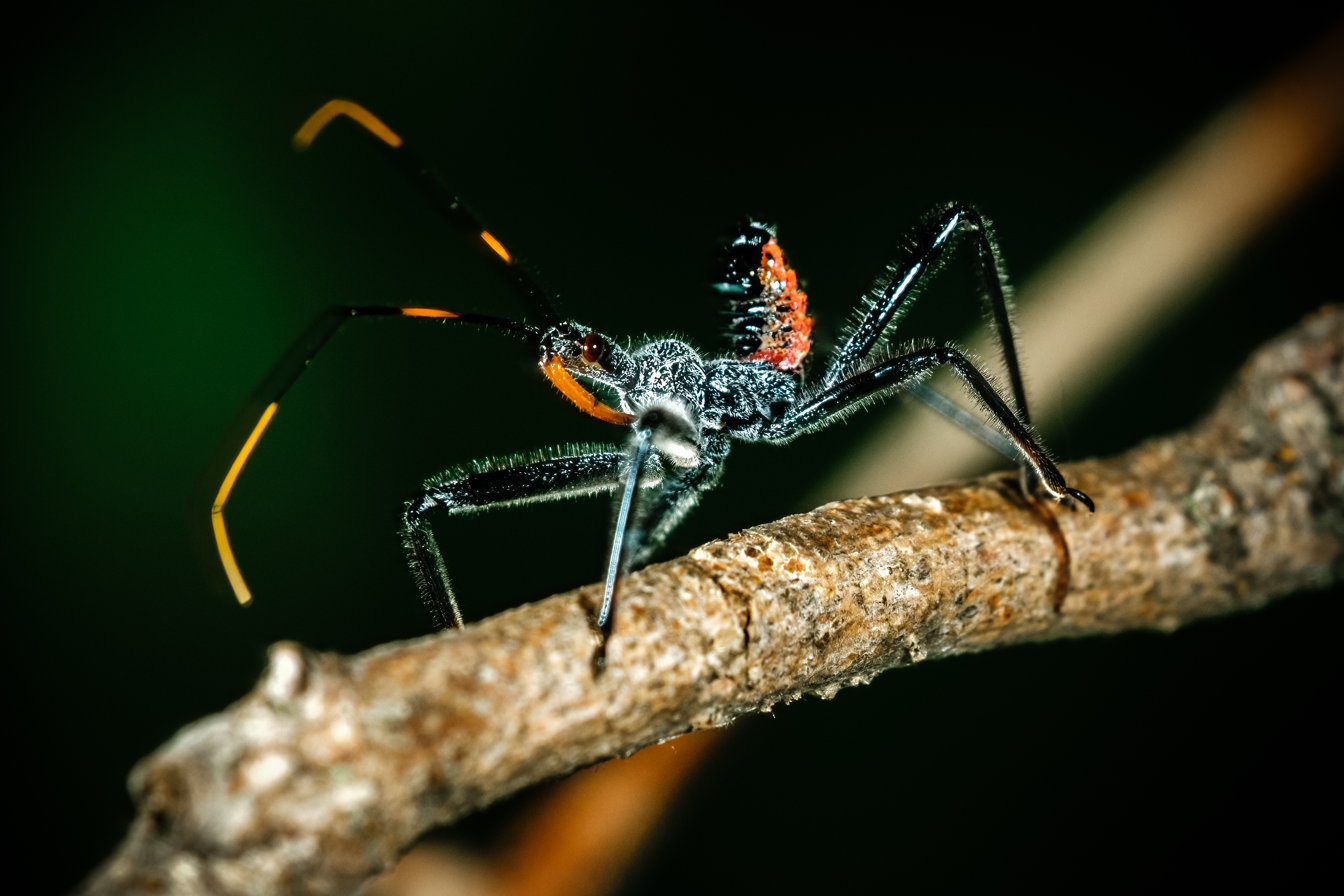
North American wheel bug nymph

Arilus cristatus, also known as the North American wheel bug or simply wheel bug, is a species of large assassin bug in the family Reduviidae and the only species of wheel bug found in the United States. It is one of the largest terrestrial Hemiptera in North America, reaching up to 38 mm (1.5 in) in length in its adult stage. This species exhibits sexually dimorphic characteristics, in that males are somewhat smaller than the females. A characteristic structure is the wheel-shaped pronotal ridge along its thorax. They are predators, using their proboscis to inject and dissolve prey tissue. The North American wheel bug is most active in daylight, residing in leafy areas and hiding whenever possible. Known habitats of the North American wheel bug include sunflowers, goldenrod, cotton, trunks of locust trees, and various fruit and tree groves. Despite the prevalence of the North American wheel bug in many habitats, the information compiled concerning the species is haphazard and incomplete.

== Description ==
The adult is gray to brownish gray in color and black shortly after molting, but the nymphs (which do not yet have the wheel-shaped structure) have bright red or orange abdomens. Like other species of wheel bugs, A. cristatus have a characteristic dorsal crest, shaped like a wheel or cog. They move and fly slowly, and in flight produce a noisy buzzing sound. As with other assassin bugs, the proboscis arises from the anterior end of its long, tubular head and unfolds forward when feeding.

A. cristatus possesses two scent glands (red-orange in color) that can be ejected from its abdomen with two distinct chemical functions; one gland used for defense and one gland utilized for breeding behaviors. The scent produced by it is not as powerful as that produced by stink bugs, but is still strong enough to be detected by humans.

North American wheel bugs exhibit armored forewings and membranous hind wings which allow this species to take flight. As a result of its inability to move swiftly, A. cristatus rely heavily upon camouflage, the effect of their bite, or the production of unpleasant odors in order to avoid predation.

== Distribution ==
North American wheel bugs are most common in eastern Canada and the United States, and their range extends into Mexico and Guatemala. Among the five extant species of Arilus, a western hemisphere genus, only A. cristatus is found in the United States.

== Behavior ==
North American wheel bugs initiate predation by gripping and pinning their prey with their front legs. The bug plunges its beak into its victim before injecting it with enzymes, paralyzing it and dissolving its insides, and proceeding to drain the resulting fluids. The North American wheel bug commonly preys on caterpillars and beetles, such as Japanese beetles, the cabbage worm, orange dogs, tent caterpillars, and the Mexican bean beetle.

A. cristatus is also noted to be very aggressive in the wild, and cannibalistic behaviors between them have been noted; for example, nymphs may prey on one another and the female may feed on the male after mating is concluded.

Additionally, like many reduviids, the species is capable of producing audible sound by rubbing the tip of its proboscis in a groove under its thorax. The purpose of this sound is unknown and may serve as a means of communication between members of the species.

American wheel bug attempts capture of spotted cucumber beetle and captures and rejects an ambush bug

Arilus cristatus vs. Epargyreus clarus caterpillar

North American wheel bug grooming

== Reproduction ==
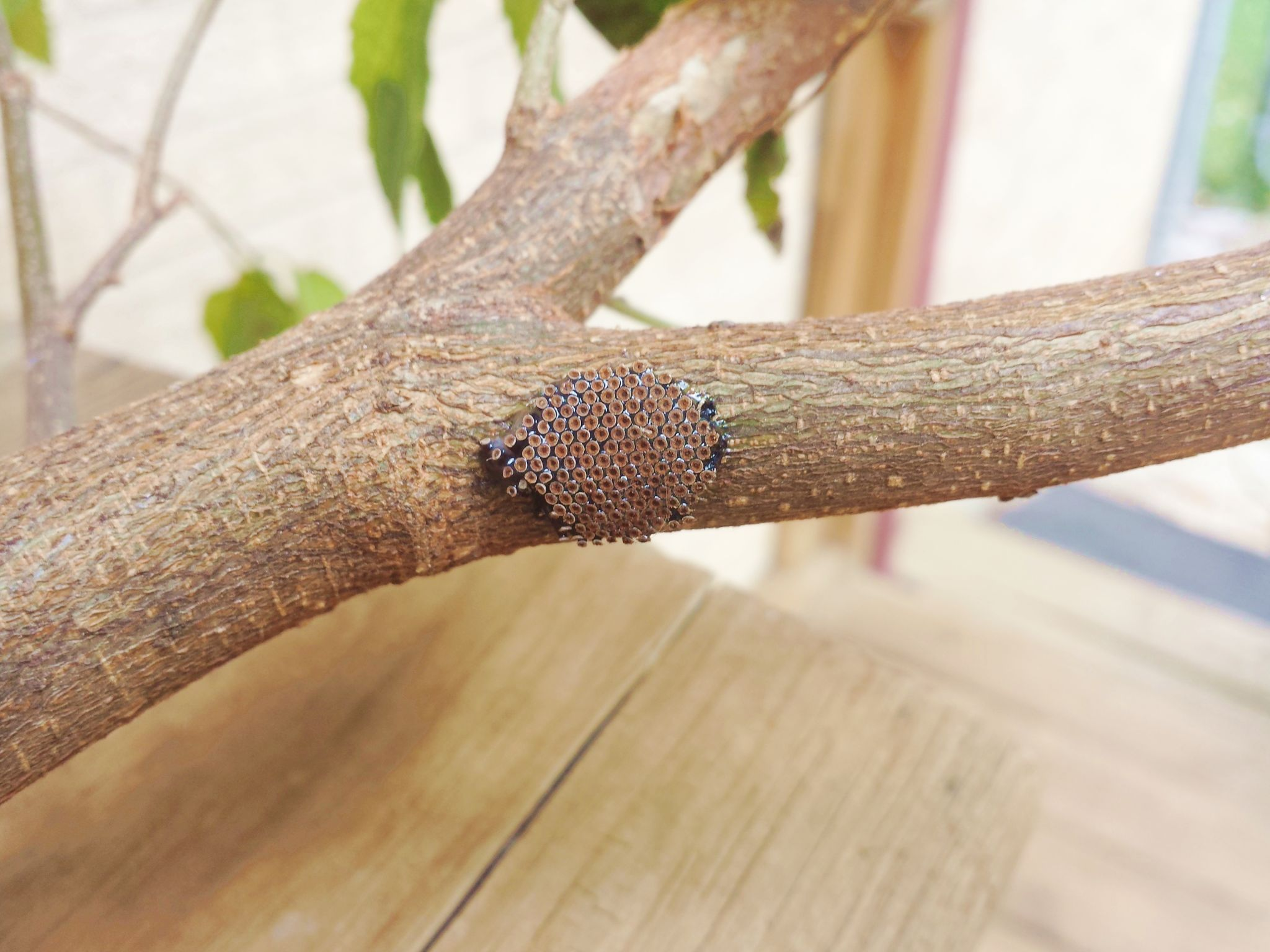
Arilus cristatus eggs

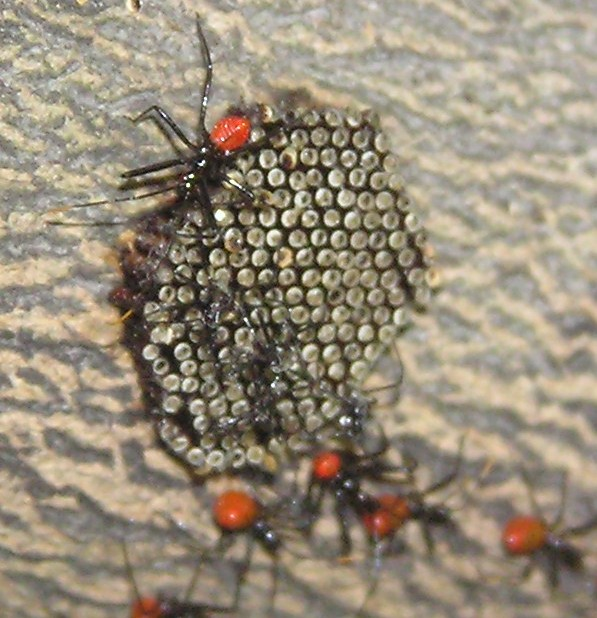
Arilus cristatus nymphs and eggs

The reproductive cycle of A. cristatus initiates in autumn. After mating, the female will lay 40 to 200 small, brown, cylindrical eggs, and eventually die. Females lay eggs on trees, bushes, twigs, and other objects. Secreted glue serves as an adhesive which maintains the cluster formation of the eggs. The eggs will hatch in the following spring into eight-millimeter-long red nymphs, which will undergo five molts until they reach the adult stage the following summer.

After the nymphs hatch, the average length of each molt is roughly 18.8 days, though the interval of the 5th and final molt prior to the adult stage is the longest. Eggs generally hatch in the beginning of May and finally mature into adults by July. Overall, it takes roughly 94 days for nymphs to reach maturity. However, the phenology of this life cycle varies, based upon the climate which the population occupies. For instance, communities in warm climates may not overwinter as eggs.

In a laboratory test conducted at Southern Illinois University in 1997 and 1998, research revealed that the species’ eggs may be attacked by parasitic wasps, such as Ooencyrtus johnsoni. Of the 12 clusters of eggs monitored in the lab, 10 were ravaged by parasites which prevented the eggs from hatching normally.

A. cristatus is predatory immediately upon hatching, but the distinctive wheel unique to the species appears only after the bug reaches the adult stage following the final molt.

== Ecological significance ==
North American wheel bugs are highly regarded by organic gardeners because they consume a variety of insects and their presence indicates a healthy, pesticide-free ecosystem. "They're the lion or the eagle of your food web," Dr. Michael J. Raupp, an entomologist at the University of Maryland, notes. "They sit on top. When you have these big, ferocious predators in your landscape, that tells me that this is a very healthy landscape, because all these other levels in your food web are intact."

Although A. cristatus is a welcome agent of pest control, this species also preys on several ecologically beneficial species, such as lady beetles and honey bees.

== Interactions with humans ==
The species is generally indifferent concerning the presence and interruption of humans. Although evidence suggests that A. cristatus can seemingly be tamed in controlled environments, if provoked or mishandled, they may attack in an act of defense. Their bite is generally considered to be of greater severity in terms of the level and duration of pain than the sting of common insects, such as wasps. The resulting wound is documented to be extremely painful, lasting, and lingering, accompanied by numbness which can persist for days. These effects can be avoided by handling the docile insect with gloves. The bite is not considered highly venomous, so it is not serious in the short term. Furthermore, the vicinity of the injury is known to become heated and irritated. A white crust sometimes forms around the wound during the healing process, though it eventually deteriorates, leaving the small puncture wound visible. Discomfort may persist for two weeks and up to six months in some cases. However, the latter timeline is frequently attributed to allergic reactions or recurrent infections of the original wound.

== Gallery ==
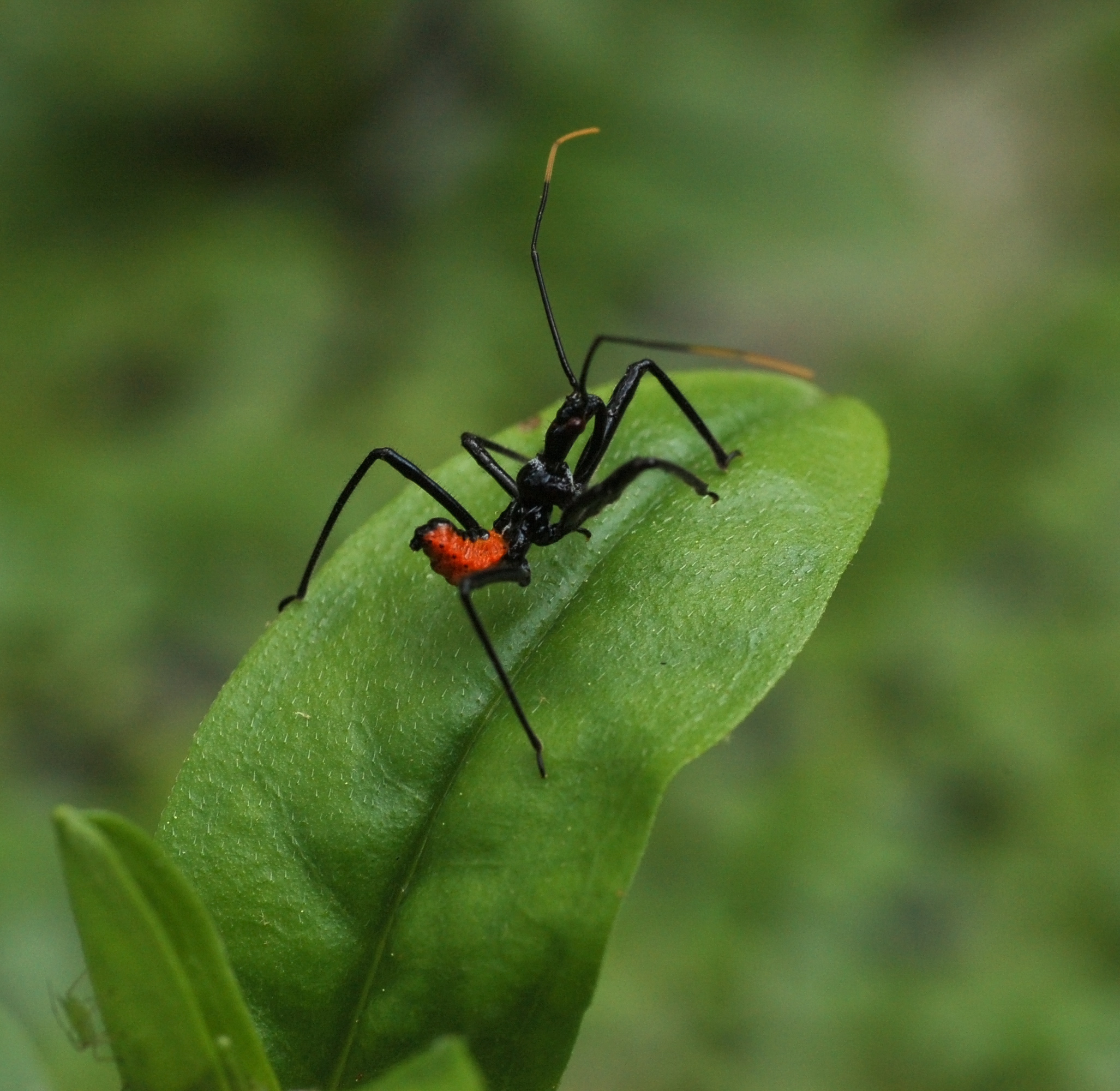
Arilus cristatus nymph closeup

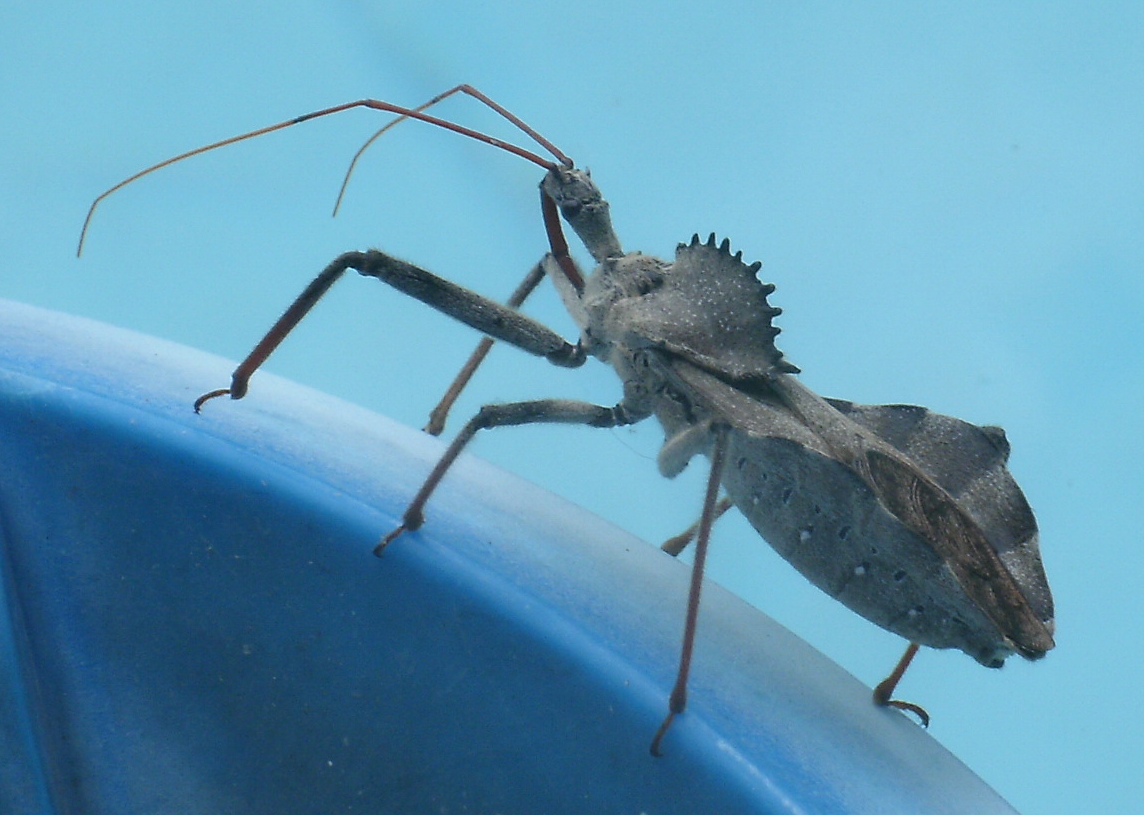
Arilus cristatus on pool skimmer, Arkansas

Arilus cristatus vs. Epargyreus clarus caterpillar

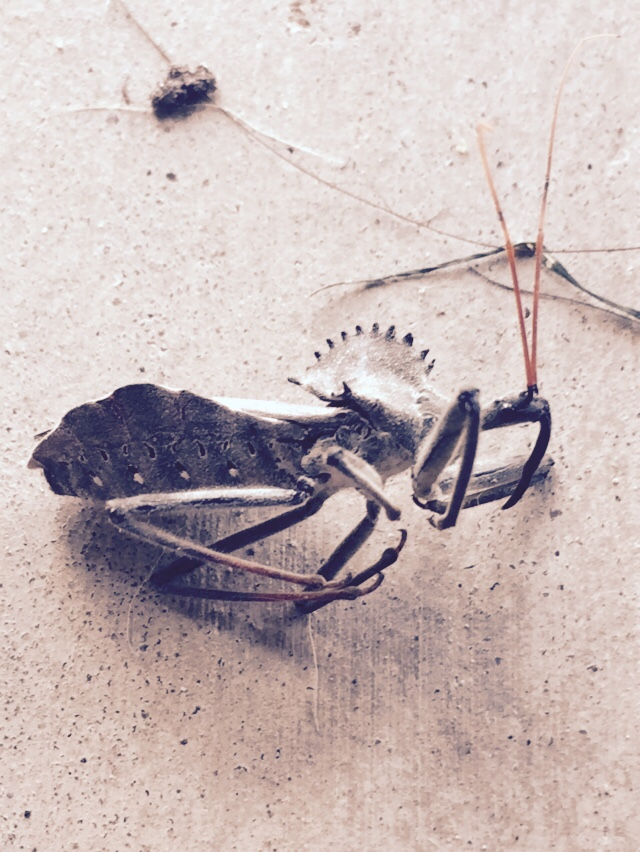
Arilus cristatus adult found in Fort Worth, Texas

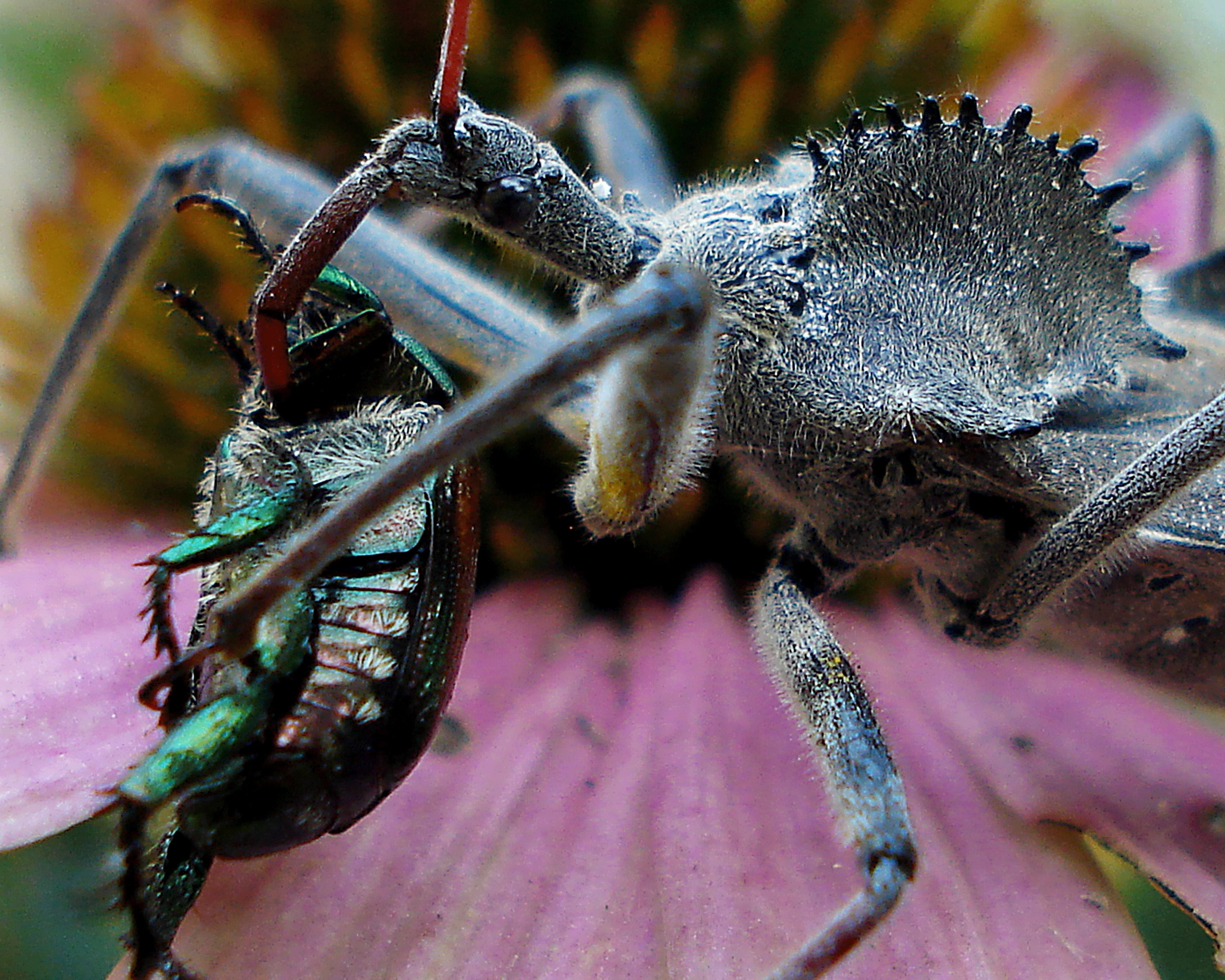
Arilus cristatus consuming a Japanese beetle

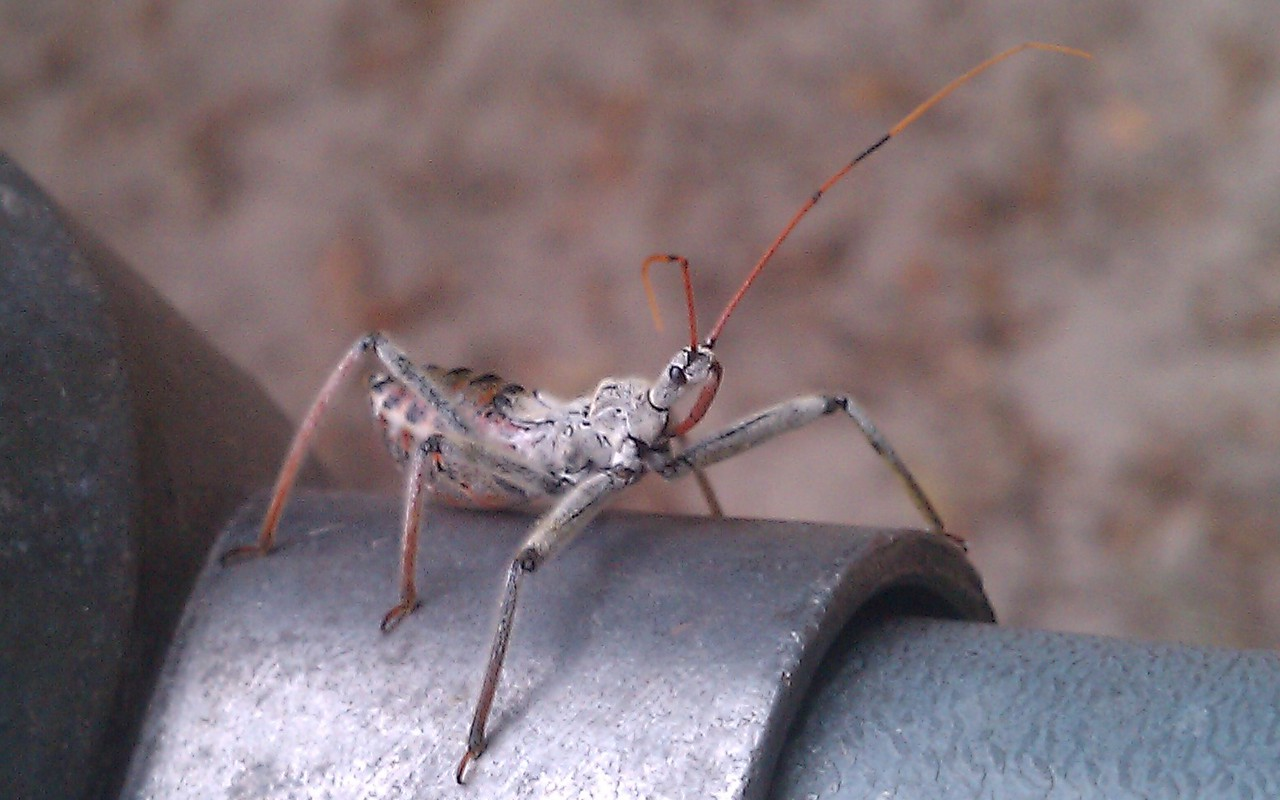
Older nymph walking atop a fence

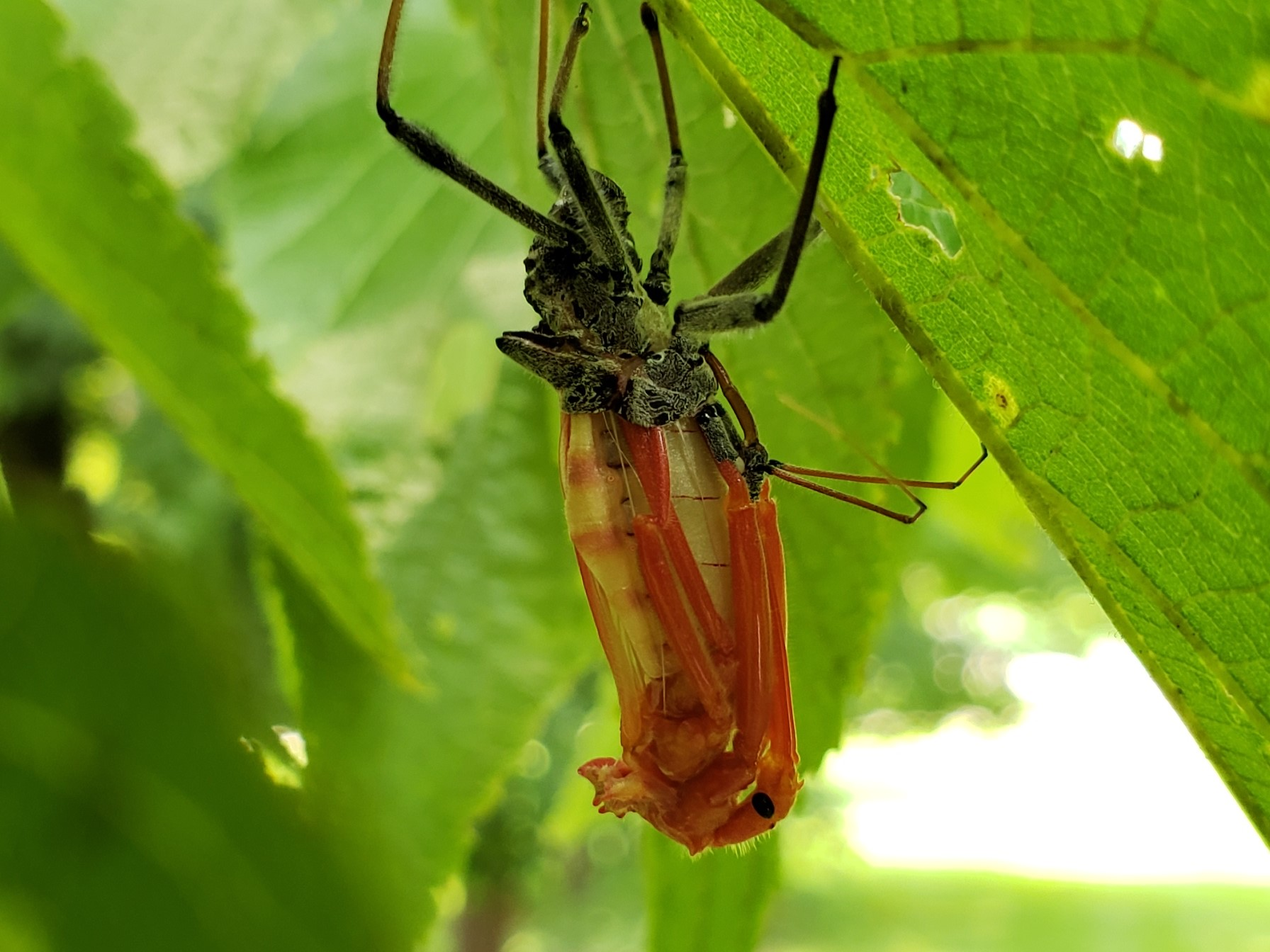
An adult Arilus cristatus emerging from its nymphal skin

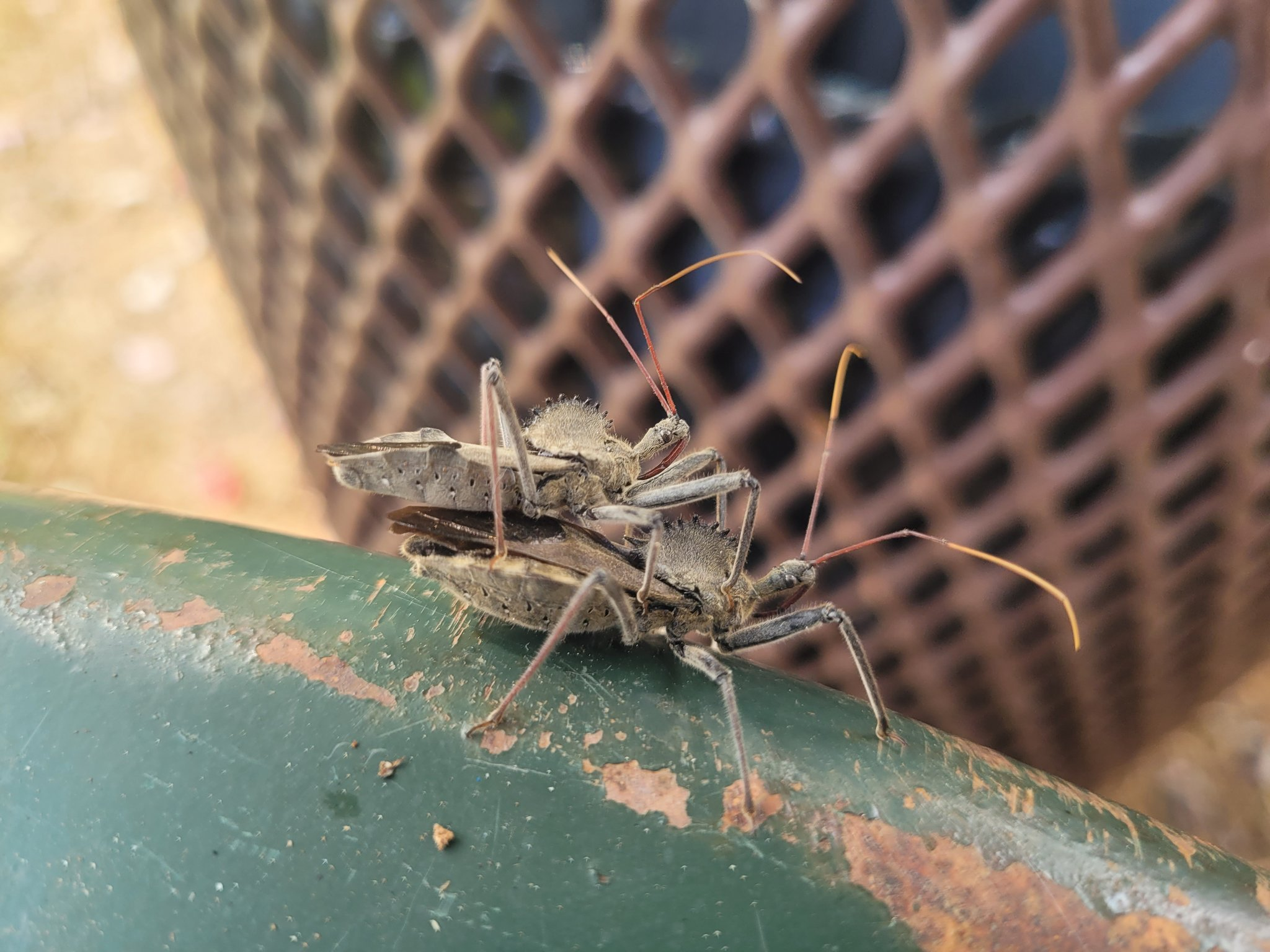
A mating Arilus cristatus pair

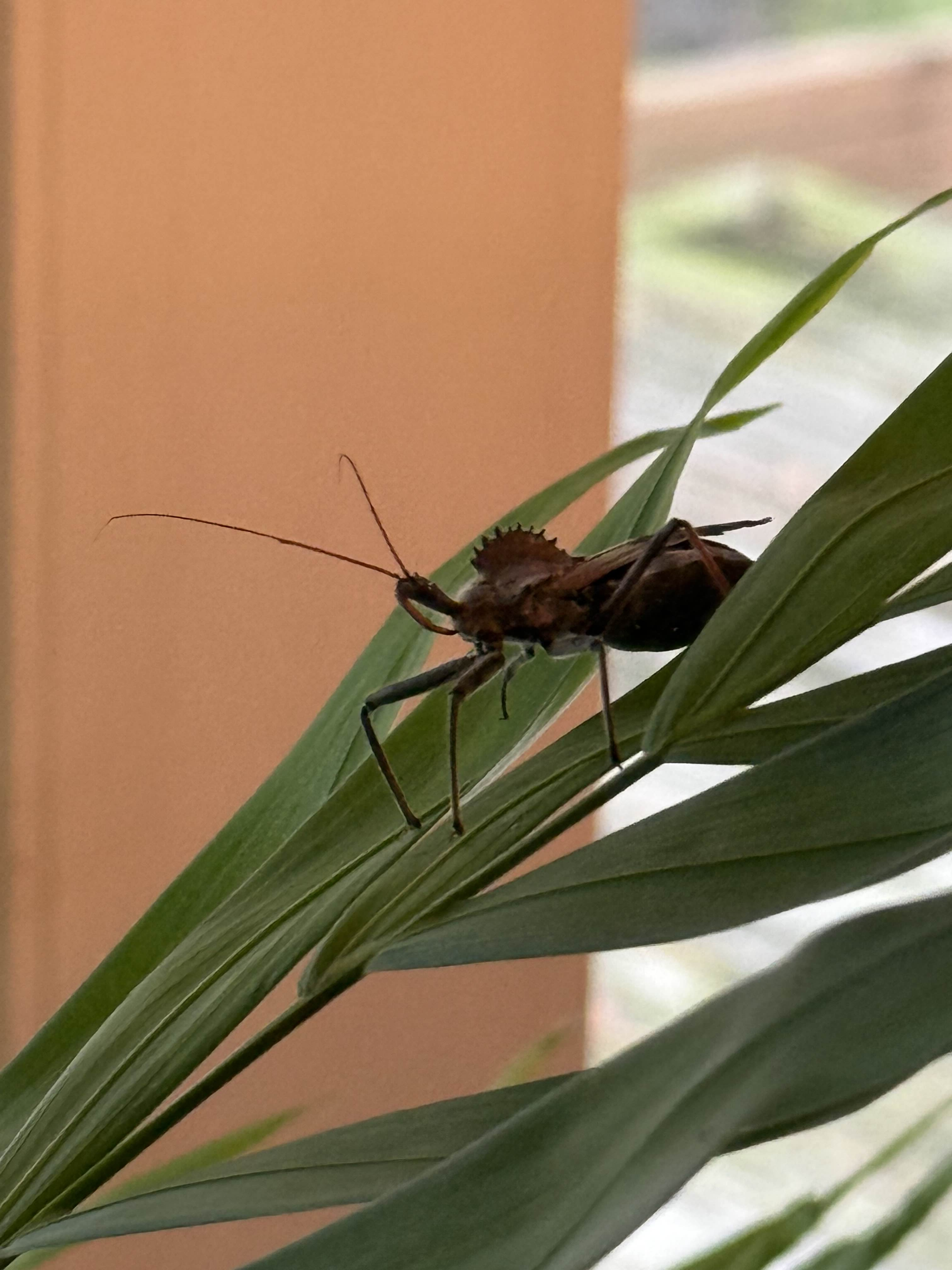
Arilus cristatus on juvenile Roystonea regia, Maryland
