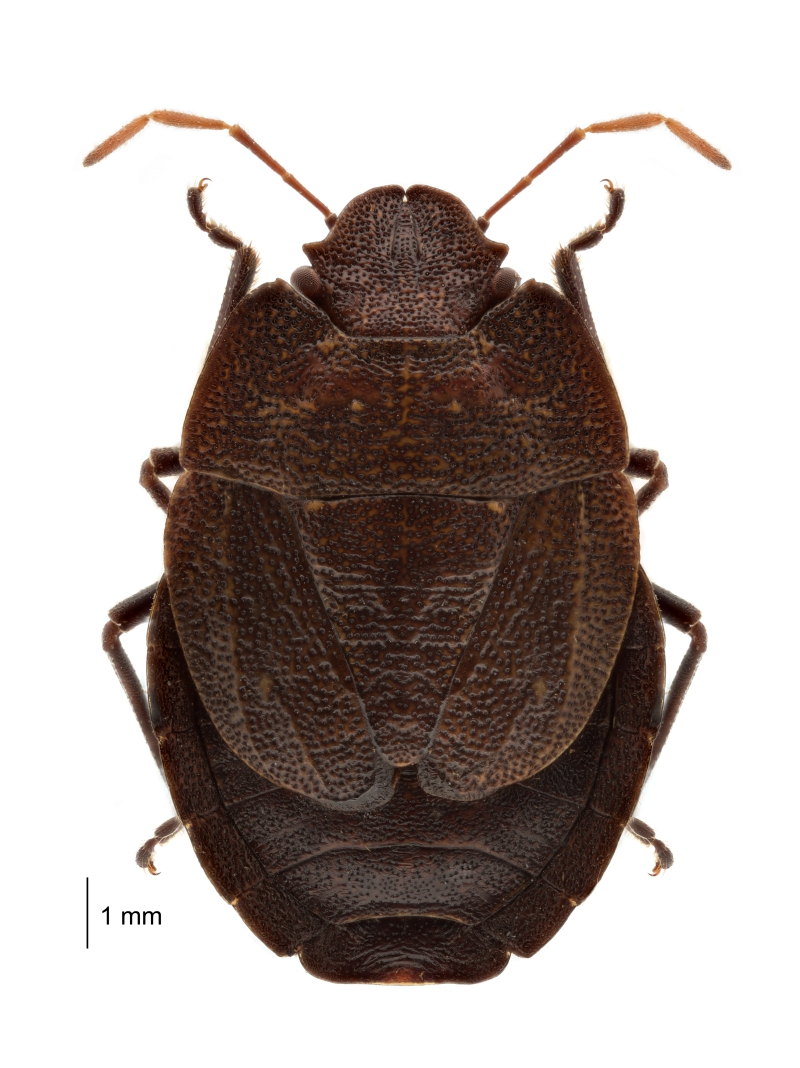
- Dorsal view

Conservation status
- Naturally Uncommon (NZ TCS)

Scientific classification
- Kingdom: Animalia
- Phylum: Arthropoda
- Class: Insecta
- Order: Hemiptera
- Suborder: Heteroptera
- Family: Pentatomidae
- Genus: Hypsithocus
- Species: H. hudsonae

Binomial name
- Hypsithocus hudsonae Bergroth, 1927

= Hypsithocus hudsonae =

Species of true bug

Hypsithocus hudsonae, sometimes called the alpine shield bug or black alpine shield bug, is a species of flightless shield bug endemic to New Zealand. Few specimens have ever been collected and these have come from a relatively narrow geographical range. The New Zealand Department of Conservation classifies this species as 'At Risk,' with qualifiers 'data poor' and 'range restricted.'

== Description ==
H. hudsonae are dark brown shield bugs, 7–9 mm in length. Their bodies are oval shaped and flattened. Nymphs appear similar to adults except the margins of their bodies are pale brown. It is the only flightless New Zealand shield bug.

== Life history ==
As with many species of Pentatomidae, H. hudsonae nymphs hatch from eggs and pass through five instars before reaching adulthood.

== Ecology ==
Specimens have only ever been collected from a small number of mountain sites in Central Otago 1200–1700 m above sea level. Their limited range may be explained by a lack of dispersal ability, as adults are flightless. The species is herbivorous, and has been collected from Veronica odora, so may feed on that species. Mating is likely to occur in summer and the species probably only has a single brood each year.

== Conservation status ==
Under the New Zealand Threat Classification System, this species is listed as "Naturally Uncommon" with the qualifiers of "Data Poor", "Range Restricted" and "Biologically Sparse" as of 2012.
