= Cat-facing =

Type of damage to tomato fruit

Cat-facing, or catfacing, refers to a type of physiological damage affecting tomatoes and represented by scarring and cavities near the blossom end. It is the abnormal development of plant tissue affecting the ovary or female sex organ (pistilate), which results in the flower, followed by the fruit development to become malformed. It is called "cat-facing" because the abnormal cracking and dimpling on tomatoes, peaches, apples and even grapes, looks somewhat akin to a small cat’s face.

This condition is usually caused by unfavorable growing conditions like drops in temperature and poor soil. Cat-facing appears when part of the fruit develops before the rest, disease, or by insect adults and nymphs feeding on the surface of the fruit as indicated by unsightly dimpling, deformity, and deciduous scarring. Similar damage can also appear on fruits such as peaches, apples and grapes.

Fruit that has catface abnormalities can still be eaten but is not necessarily marketable.

== Causes of Cat-facing ==
While it is uncertain, temperatures below 60 F. (16 C.) for a number of successive days when plants are immature — about three weeks prior to blooming — appear to coincide with tomato catfacing fruit deformity. The result is incomplete pollination, which creates the deformity. Physical trauma to the blossom can also cause cat-facing. Additionally, catfacing may appear if the fruit has exposure to herbicides containing phenoxy. Excess nitrogen levels in the soil media can also aggravate the issue as well as aggressive pruning. Thrips, tiny slender insects with fringed wings, may also contribute as an origin for catfacing. Plants that are infected with Tomato Little Leaf are also susceptible to tomato fruit catfacing deformity.

== How to Treat Cat-facing ==
Little can be done to control the abnormality. Proper growing practices revolving around monitoring temperature, overt pruning, and nitrogen levels in soils should be accomplished. Also, avoid the use of hormonal herbicides and the potential drift that may accompany their use. Finally, grow only varieties that historically have no issue with catfacing disorder; and in the case of Little Leaf infection, prevent the soil from becoming sodden by irrigation control and well-draining soil.
