= Castolus ferox =

Scientific classification
- Domain: Eukaryota
- Kingdom: Animalia
- Phylum: Arthropoda
- Class: Insecta
- Order: Hemiptera
- Suborder: Heteroptera
- Family: Reduviidae
- Tribe: Harpactorini
- Genus: Castolus
- Species: C. ferox

Binomial name
- Castolus ferox (Banks, 1910)

Species of true bug

Castolus ferox is a species of assassin bug in the family Reduviidae. It is found in North America.
