= Coranus elegans =

Scientific classification
- Domain: Eukaryota
- Kingdom: Animalia
- Phylum: Arthropoda
- Class: Insecta
- Order: Hemiptera
- Suborder: Heteroptera
- Family: Reduviidae
- Subfamily: Harpactorinae
- Tribe: Harpactorini
- Genus: Coranus
- Species: C. elegans

Binomial name
- Coranus elegans (Schouteden, 1952)

Species of true bug

Coranus elegans is a species of assassin bug in the sub family Harpactorinae. It is found in Africa.
