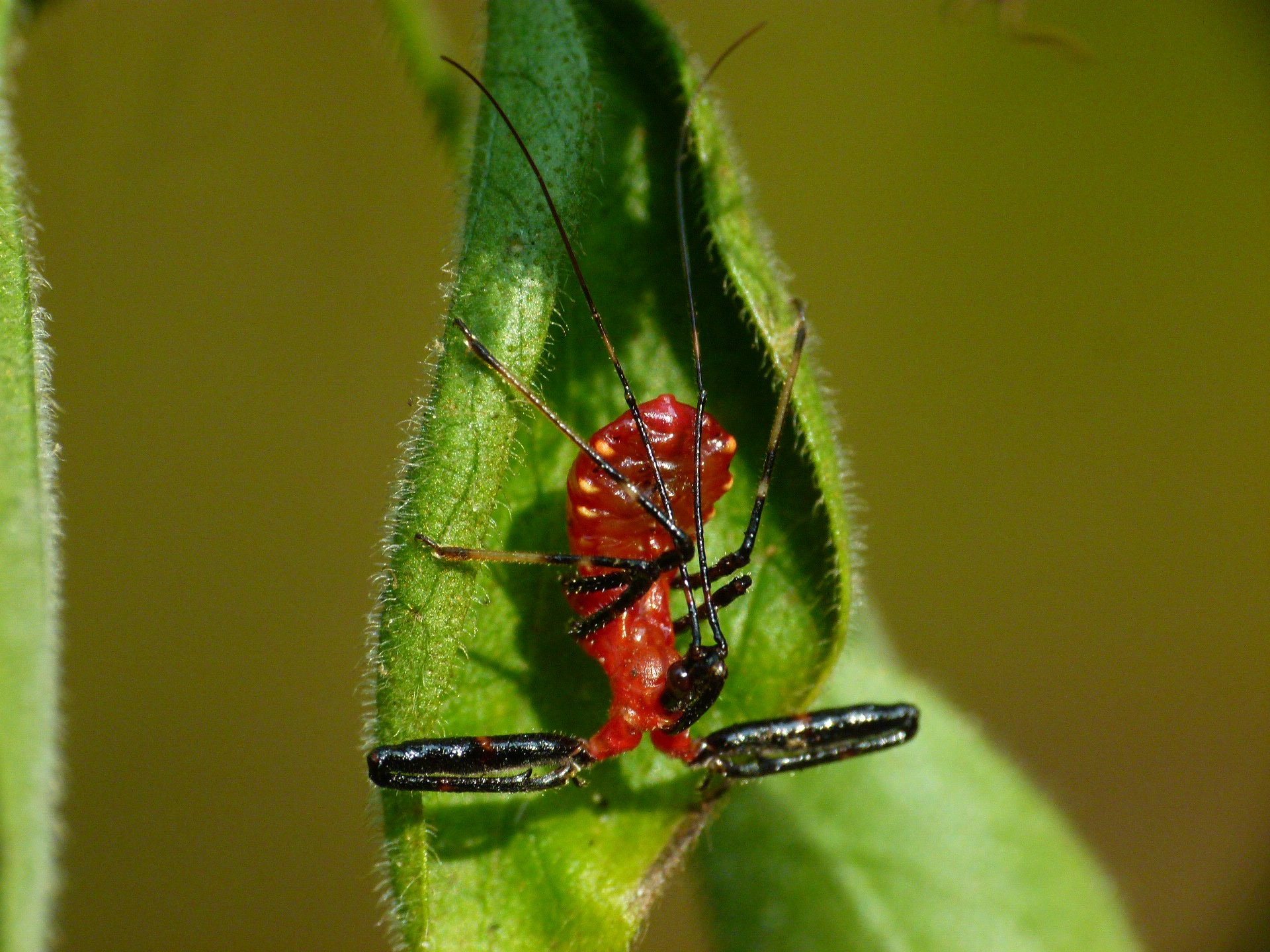
- R. cf. trochantericus nymph from the Western Ghats

Scientific classification
- Kingdom: Animalia
- Phylum: Arthropoda
- Clade: Pancrustacea
- Class: Insecta
- Order: Hemiptera
- Suborder: Heteroptera
- Family: Reduviidae
- Tribe: Harpactorini
- Genus: Rihirbus; Stål, 1861

Type species
- Rihirbus trochantericus Stål, 1861

= Rihirbus =

Genus of assassin bugs

Rihirbus is a genus of assassin bug from the tropical parts of the Oriental region. They belong to the Harpactorinae and the genus is unique in having the fore tibiae with incurved tips and the apex having a long tooth. They show sexual dimorphism and are polymorphic making their identification to species complicated. Females are larger and wider. R. trochantericus takes about 49 days to develop from egg to adult in southern India.

The genus Camptibia has an incurved tip to the foretibia, but lacks subapical teeth. The head is shorter than the pronotum and the base of the antenna has a spine behind it. The antennal scape is about as long as the head, pronotum and scutellum put together. They show considerable polymorphism and sexual dimorphism and in the past a number of species have been described but only three are currently recognized.

- R. sinicus Hsiao & Ren, 1981 - has the anterior pronotal lobe without an obtuse tubercular lobe posterior to it, humeral angle of pronotum round and posterior margin nearly straight
- R. trochantericus Stål, 1861 - has a bituberculate lobe posterior to the anterior pronotal lobe. Humeral angle of pronotum sharper and posterior pronotal margin convex.
- R. kronganaensis Truong, Bui, Ha & Cai, 2020 - nearly all black except for yellow abdomen tip, found in the highlands of Vietnam - the post-antennal protuberance is high and spine-shaped, the pronotum has obtuse humeral angles and the foretibia is produced into a sharp spine
