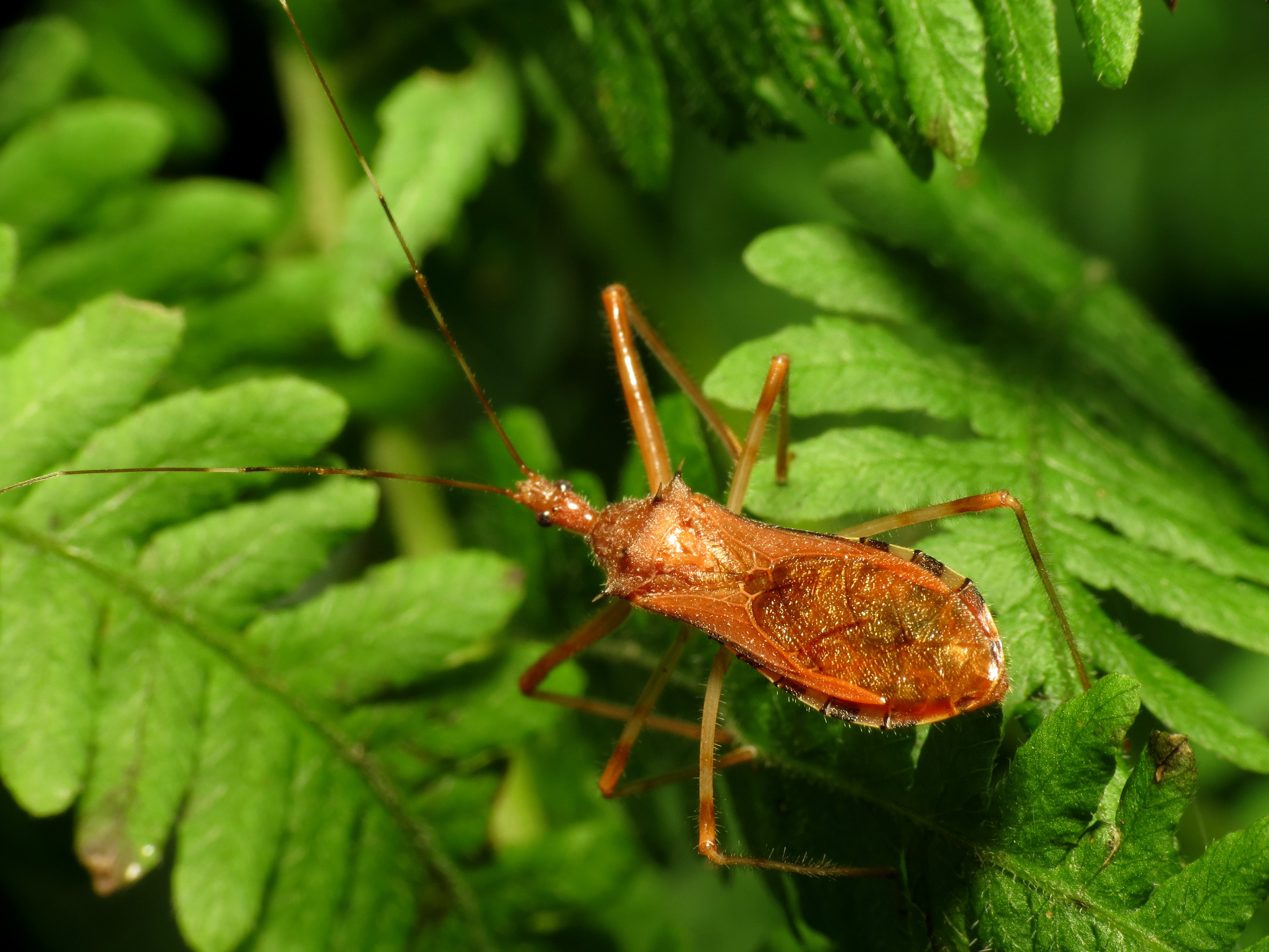

Scientific classification
- Kingdom: Animalia
- Phylum: Arthropoda
- Clade: Pancrustacea
- Class: Insecta
- Order: Hemiptera
- Suborder: Heteroptera
- Family: Reduviidae
- Tribe: Harpactorini
- Genus: Rocconota
- Species: R. annulicornis

Binomial name
- Rocconota annulicornis (Stål, 1872)

= Rocconota annulicornis =

Species of true bug

Rocconota annulicornis is a species of assassin bug in the family Reduviidae. It is found in Central America and North America.
