= Sinea anacantha =

Scientific classification
- Domain: Eukaryota
- Kingdom: Animalia
- Phylum: Arthropoda
- Class: Insecta
- Order: Hemiptera
- Suborder: Heteroptera
- Family: Reduviidae
- Tribe: Harpactorini
- Genus: Sinea
- Species: S. anacantha

Binomial name
- Sinea anacantha Hussey, 1953

Species of true bug

Sinea anacantha is a species of assassin bug in the family Reduviidae. It is found in North America.
