= Doldina interjungens =

Scientific classification
- Domain: Eukaryota
- Kingdom: Animalia
- Phylum: Arthropoda
- Class: Insecta
- Order: Hemiptera
- Suborder: Heteroptera
- Family: Reduviidae
- Tribe: Harpactorini
- Genus: Doldina
- Species: D. interjungens

Binomial name
- Doldina interjungens Bergroth, 1913

Species of true bug

Doldina interjungens is a species of assassin bug in the family Reduviidae. It is found in Central and North America.
