= Sinea rileyi =

Scientific classification
- Domain: Eukaryota
- Kingdom: Animalia
- Phylum: Arthropoda
- Class: Insecta
- Order: Hemiptera
- Suborder: Heteroptera
- Family: Reduviidae
- Tribe: Harpactorini
- Genus: Sinea
- Species: S. rileyi

Binomial name
- Sinea rileyi Montandon, 1893

Species of true bug

Sinea rileyi is a species of assassin bug in the family Reduviidae. It is found in Europe and Northern Asia (excluding China) and North America.
