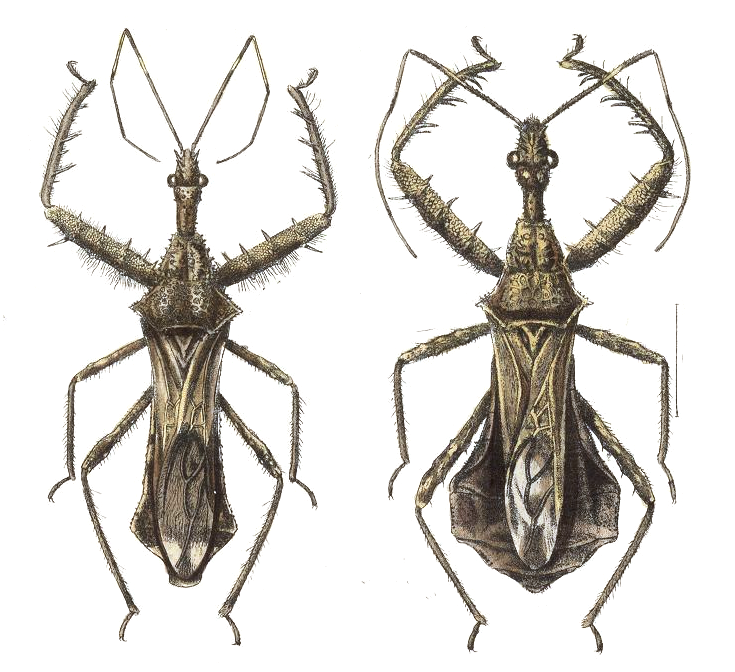

Scientific classification
- Kingdom: Animalia
- Phylum: Arthropoda
- Clade: Pancrustacea
- Class: Insecta
- Order: Hemiptera
- Suborder: Heteroptera
- Family: Reduviidae
- Tribe: Harpactorini
- Genus: Sinea
- Species: S. coronata

Binomial name
- Sinea coronata Stål, 1862

= Sinea coronata =

Species of true bug

Sinea coronata is a species of assassin bug in the family Reduviidae. It is found in the Caribbean Sea, Central America, and North America.
