= Heza similis =

Scientific classification
- Domain: Eukaryota
- Kingdom: Animalia
- Phylum: Arthropoda
- Class: Insecta
- Order: Hemiptera
- Suborder: Heteroptera
- Family: Reduviidae
- Tribe: Harpactorini
- Genus: Heza
- Species: H. similis

Binomial name
- Heza similis Stal, 1859

Species of true bug

Heza similis is a species of assassin bug in the family Reduviidae. It is found in the Caribbean Sea, Central America, North America, and South America.
