= Acholla ampliata =

Scientific classification
- Domain: Eukaryota
- Kingdom: Animalia
- Phylum: Arthropoda
- Class: Insecta
- Order: Hemiptera
- Suborder: Heteroptera
- Family: Reduviidae
- Tribe: Harpactorini
- Genus: Acholla
- Species: A. ampliata

Binomial name
- Acholla ampliata Stål, 1872

Species of true bug

Acholla ampliata is a species of assassin bug in the family Reduviidae. It is found in Central America and North America.
