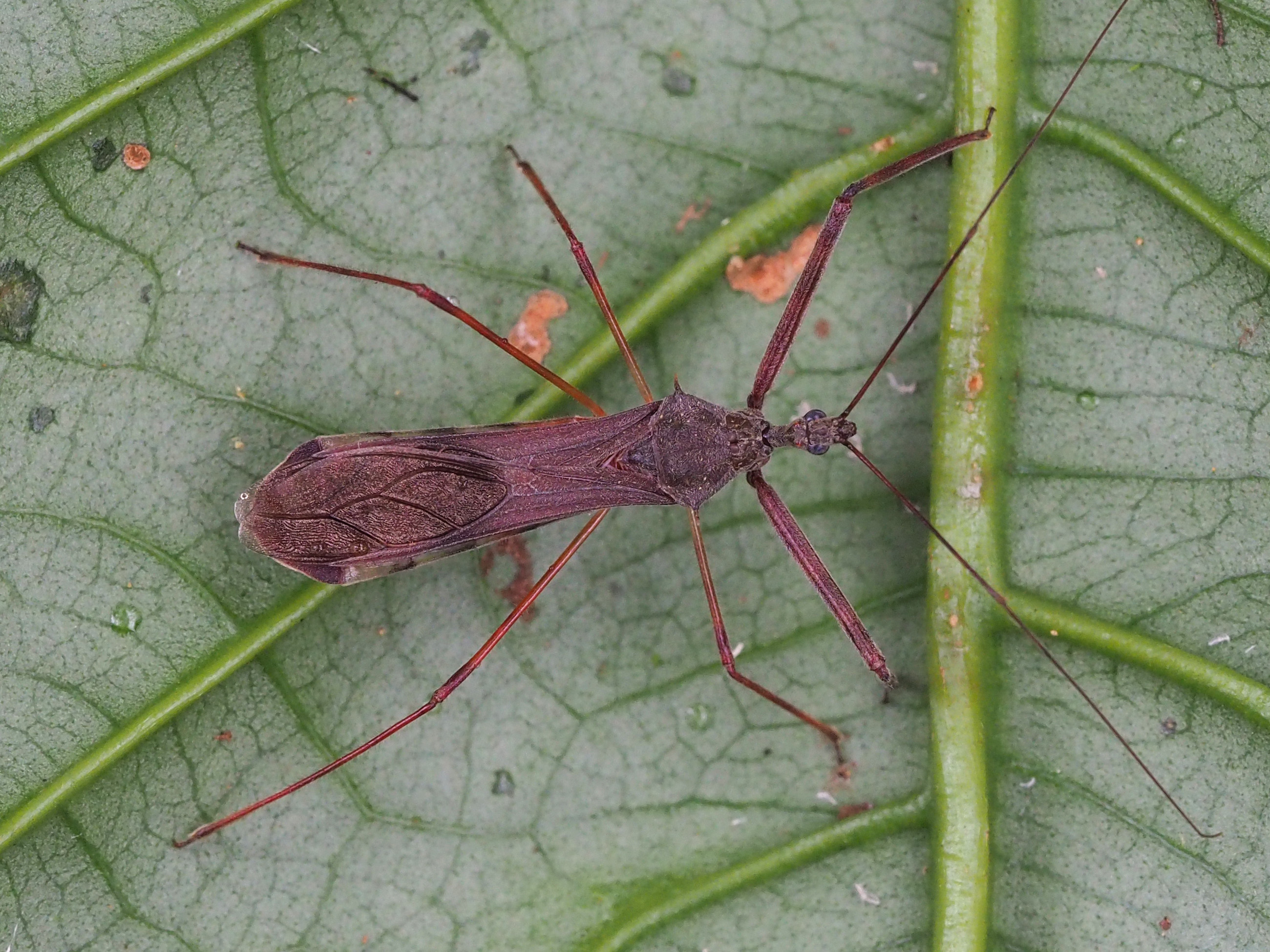
- Heza ephippium, Galápagos, Ecuador
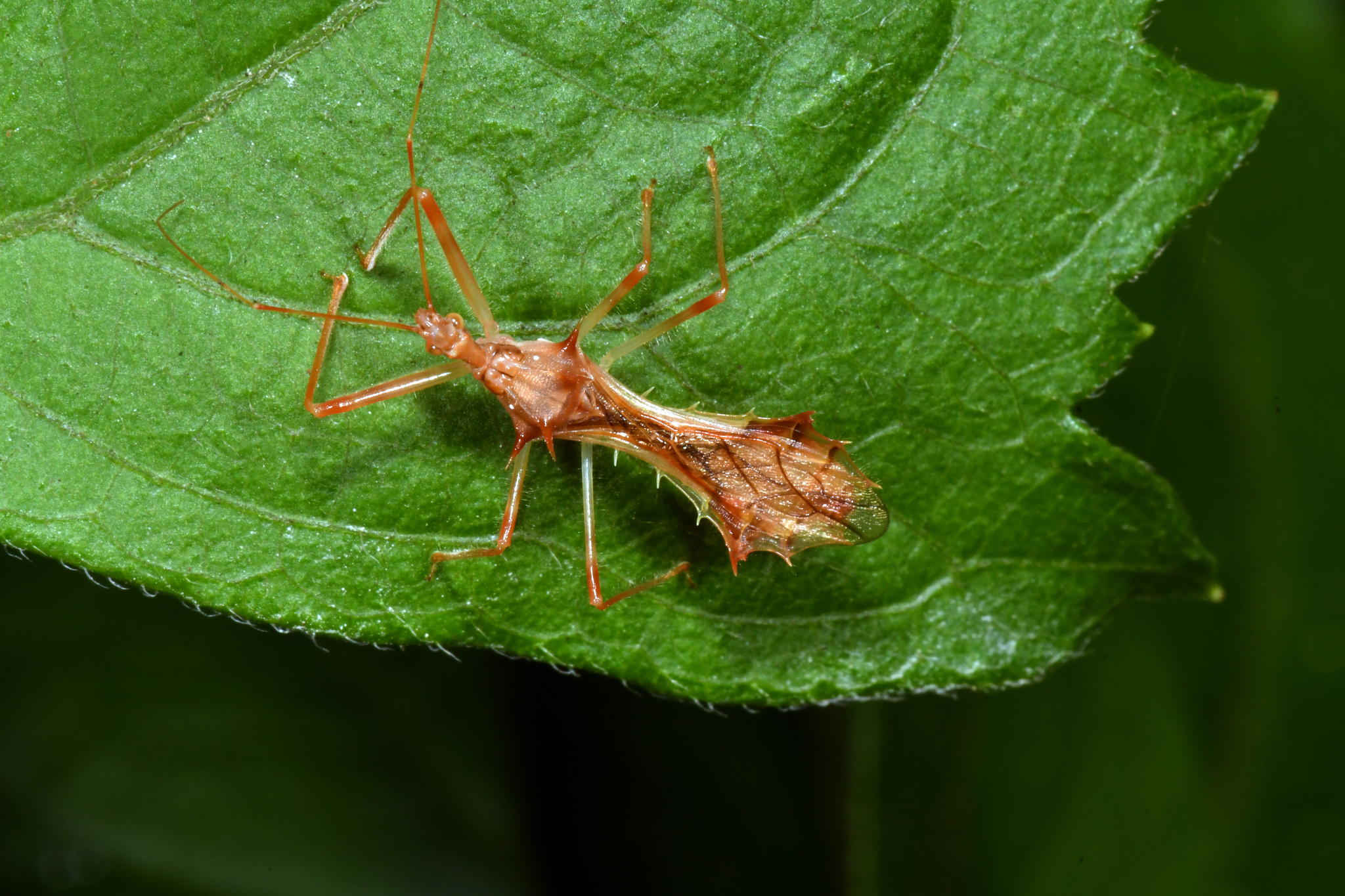
- Heza clavata, Dominican Republic

Scientific classification
- Kingdom: Animalia
- Phylum: Arthropoda
- Clade: Pancrustacea
- Class: Insecta
- Order: Hemiptera
- Suborder: Heteroptera
- Family: Reduviidae
- Subfamily: Harpactorinae
- Tribe: Harpactorini
- Genus: Heza; Amyot & Serville, 1843

= Heza =

Genus of true bugs

Heza is a genus of assassin bugs belonging to the family Reduviidae. Spedies of this genus are found in the Americas.

== Species ==
There are currently more than 30 described species that belong to the genus Heza:

- Heza acantharis (Linnaeus, 1767)
- Heza angulifer Barber, 1939
- Heza angustata Bruner, 1931
- Heza aurantia Maldonado, 1976
- Heza azteca Maldonado & Brailovsky, 1983
- Heza bahamensis Maldonado, 1983
- Heza binotata (Lepeletier & Serville, 1825)
- Heza canizaresi Bruner, 1946
- Heza clavata (Guérin-Méneville, 1857)
- Heza cubana Grillo, 1989-01
- Heza ephippium (Lichtenstein, 1797)
- Heza ferox Stål, 1863
- Heza funebris Maldonado, 1983
- Heza fuscinervis Champion, 1899
- Heza haitiana Maldonado, 1976
- Heza havanensis Bruner, 1931
- Heza insignis Stål, 1859
- Heza jamaicensis (Distant, 1903)
- Heza leucothorax Maldonado, 1976
- Heza maldonadoi Bérenger, 2007-01
- Heza multiannulata Stål, 1860
- Heza multiguttata Champion, 1899
- Heza ocellata Maldonado, 1976
- Heza oculata Stål, 1859
- Heza ondulata Maldonado, 1983
- Heza ornata Maldonado, 1976
- Heza perarmata (Kirby, 1901)
- Heza polita Maldonado, 1976
- Heza pulchripes Stål, 1859
- Heza punctigera (Herrich-Schaeffer, 1835)
- Heza rubra Maldonado, 1976
- Heza rubromarga Maldonado, 1976
- Heza scutellata Maldonado, 1983
- Heza sericans Stål, 1859
- Heza signoreti (Fallou, 1887)
- Heza similis Stal, 1859
- Heza sphinx Stål, 1863
- Heza ventralis Stål, 1872
