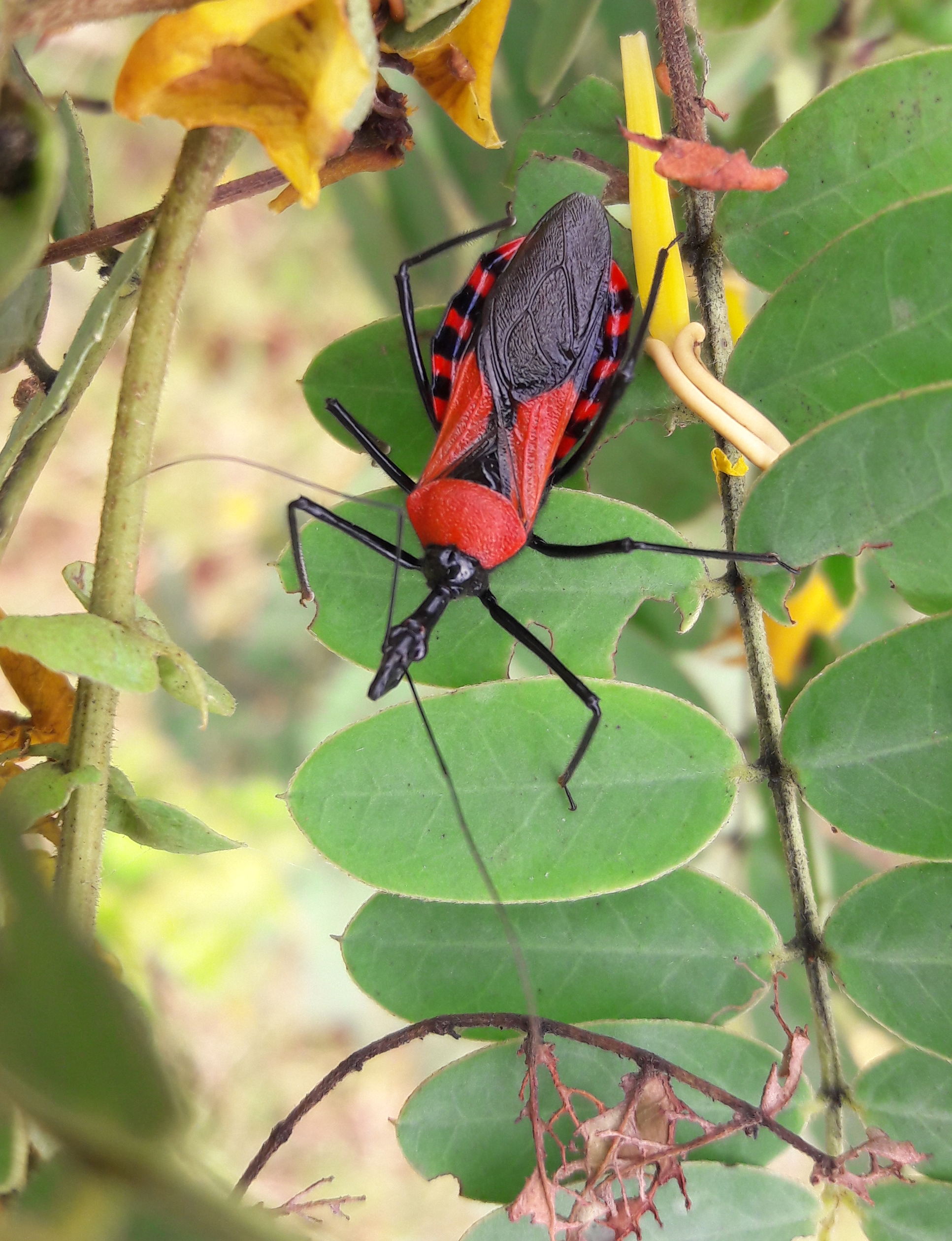
- From Mysore, India

Scientific classification
- Kingdom: Animalia
- Phylum: Arthropoda
- Clade: Pancrustacea
- Class: Insecta
- Order: Hemiptera
- Suborder: Heteroptera
- Family: Reduviidae
- Genus: Sycanus
- Species: S. indagator

Binomial name
- Sycanus indagator Stål, 1863

= Sycanus indagator =

Species of true bug

Sycanus indagator is a species of assassin bug found in India. It has been used a biological control agent in parts of the United States for its potential as a predator of lepidopteran caterpillars such as Spodoptera frugiperda although in some lab experiments, they preferred the larvae of Galleria mellonella. Their potential for use against Pseudoplusia includens caterpillars in soybean fields has also been tested in the past in the US. The eggs take about 10-17 days to hatch depending on the temperature and the adults took five nymphal moults with a total egg to adult duration of 80 to 100 days at tropical temperatures (and twice as long at lower temperatures).
