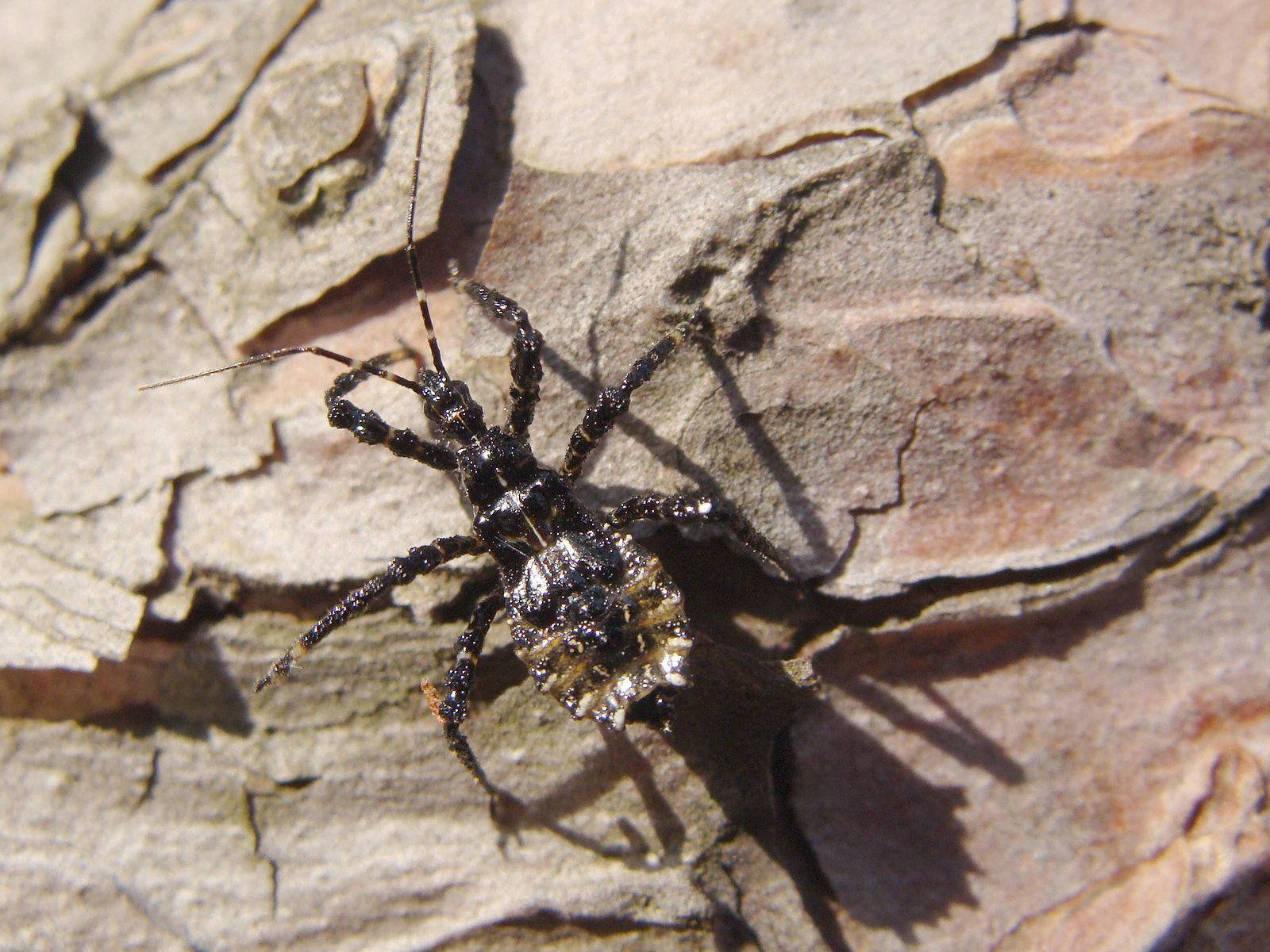
- Velinus nodipes

Scientific classification
- Kingdom: Animalia
- Phylum: Arthropoda
- Clade: Pancrustacea
- Class: Insecta
- Order: Hemiptera
- Suborder: Heteroptera
- Family: Reduviidae
- Subfamily: Harpactorinae
- Tribe: Harpactorini
- Genus: Velinus; Stål, 1865

= Velinus =

Genus of true bugs

Velinus is a genus of Asian assassin bugs in the tribe Harpactorini; it was erected by Carl Stål in 1865. Species have been recorded from Madagascar, Japan, China, Indochina, Malesia and New Guinea.

== Species ==
The Global Biodiversity Information Facility includes:

1. Velinus annulatus Distant, 1879
2. Velinus apicalis Hsiao, 1979
3. Velinus castaneus Hsiao, 1979
4. Velinus crassicrus Stål, 1874
5. Velinus foersteri Breddin, 1903
6. Velinus lobatus (Stål, 1863)
7. Velinus malayus (Stål, 1863)
8. Velinus marginatus Hsiao, 1979
9. Velinus nigrigenu (Amyot & Serville, 1843)
10. Velinus nigripes Distant, 1919
11. Velinus nodipes (Uhler, 1860)
12. Velinus pallidus Distant, 1903
13. Velinus parvus Distant, 1903
14. Velinus perfuga Bergroth, 1895
15. Velinus rotifer Bergroth, 1895
16. Velinus rufiventris Hsiao, 1979
