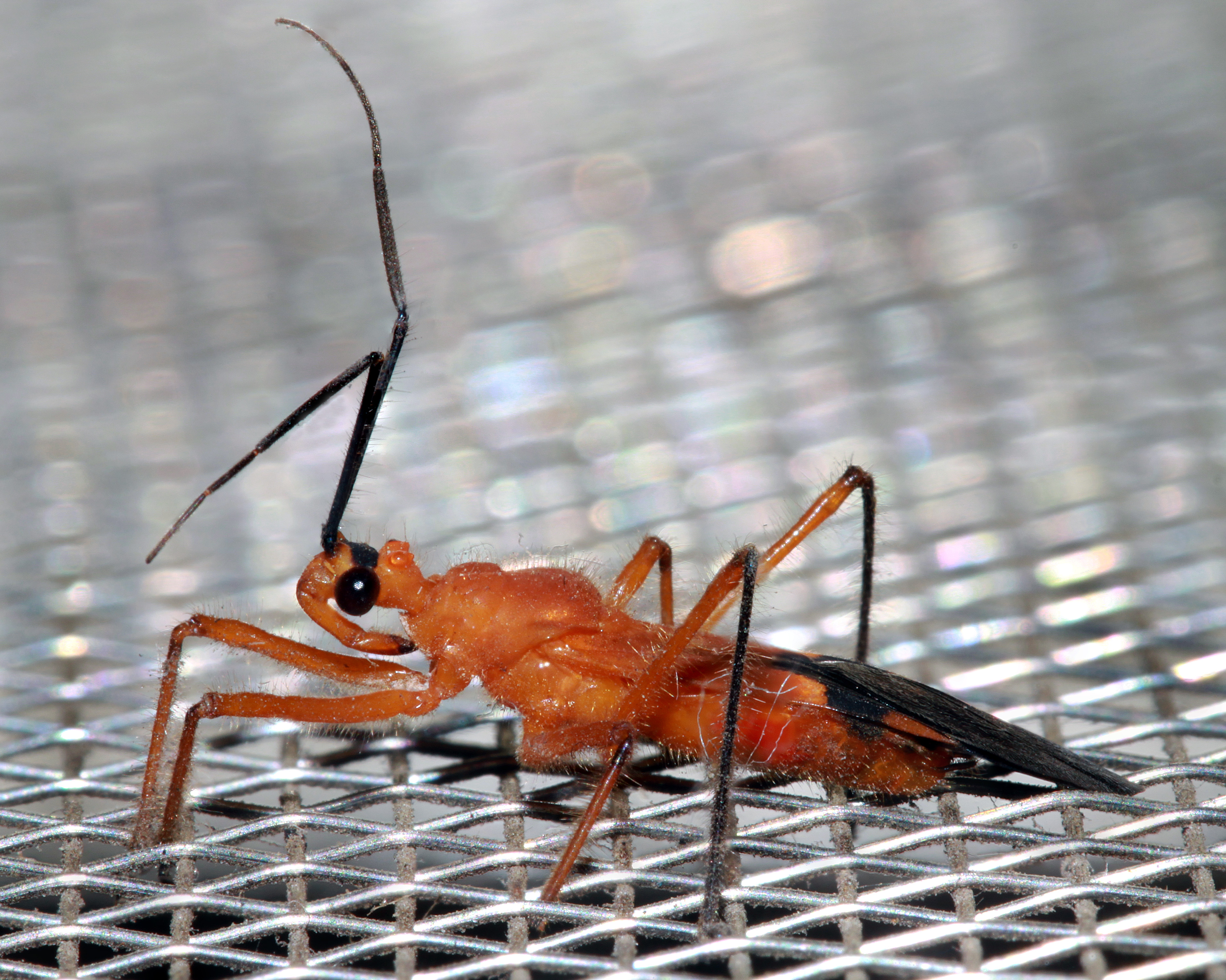
- Cydnocoris gilvus

Scientific classification
- Kingdom: Animalia
- Phylum: Arthropoda
- Clade: Pancrustacea
- Class: Insecta
- Order: Hemiptera
- Suborder: Heteroptera
- Family: Reduviidae
- Tribe: Harpactorini
- Genus: Cydnocoris; Stål, 1866

Type species
- Myocoris gilvus Burmeister, 1838

= Cydnocoris =

Genus of true bugs

Cydnocoris is a genus of assassin bugs found in tropical Asia. It has been suggested that this genus be treated either as a synonym of Cutocoris Stål, 1859, or that the later name be suppressed.

Cydnocoris gilvus has been considered a potential biological control agent against Helopeltis, as it is mass-culturable with low cannibalism. A post-mortem found that the patient died from choking due to throat inflammation caused by indigestion of a Cydnocoris gilvus.

Species in the genus include:

- Cydnocoris fasciatus Reuter,1881
- Cydnocoris gilvus (Burmeister, 1837)
- Cydnocoris crocatus Stål, 1866
- Cydnocoris russatus Stål, 1867
