= Ricolla =

Scientific classification
- Kingdom: Animalia
- Phylum: Arthropoda
- Clade: Pancrustacea
- Class: Insecta
- Order: Hemiptera
- Suborder: Heteroptera
- Family: Reduviidae
- Subfamily: Harpactorinae
- Tribe: Harpactorini
- Genus: Ricolla; Stål, 1859

Species
- Ricolla quadrispinosa; Ricolla simillima

Genus of true bugs

Ricolla is a genus of assassin bugs in the family Reduviidae.
