= Rocconota =

Scientific classification
- Kingdom: Animalia
- Phylum: Arthropoda
- Clade: Pancrustacea
- Class: Insecta
- Order: Hemiptera
- Suborder: Heteroptera
- Family: Reduviidae
- Subfamily: Harpactorinae
- Tribe: Harpactorini
- Genus: Rocconota; Stål, 1859

Genus of true bugs

Rocconota is a genus of assassin bugs in the family Reduviidae. There are about 10 described species in Rocconota.

== Species ==
These 10 species belong to the genus Rocconota:

- Rocconota annulicornis (Stål, 1872)
- Rocconota bruchi Lima, 1941
- Rocconota hystricula Champion, 1899
- Rocconota laeviceps Champion, 1899
- Rocconota octospina Stål, 1862
- Rocconota rufotestacea Champion, 1899
- Rocconota sexdentata Stål, 1859
- Rocconota sextuberculata Stål, 1859
- Rocconota subannulata (Stål, 1860)
- Rocconota tuberculigera (Stål, 1862)
