= Irantha =

Scientific classification
- Kingdom: Animalia
- Phylum: Arthropoda
- Class: Insecta
- Order: Hemiptera
- Suborder: Heteroptera
- Family: Reduviidae
- Tribe: Harpactorini
- Genus: Irantha; Stål, 1861

Species
- See text

Genus of true bugs

Irantha is a small and little-known genus of assassin bug family (Reduviidae), in the subfamily Harpactorinae. Just four species have been described.

== Species list ==
- Irantha armipes (Stål, 1855)
- Irantha bramarbas Breddin, 1903
- Irantha consobrina Distant, 1904
- Irantha nigrina Chen, Zhao & Cai, 2005
