= Zamolxis (bug) =

Scientific classification
- Kingdom: Animalia
- Phylum: Arthropoda
- Clade: Pancrustacea
- Class: Insecta
- Order: Hemiptera
- Suborder: Heteroptera
- Family: Reduviidae
- Tribe: Harpactorini
- Genus: Zamolxis; Stål, 1865

Species
- See text

Genus of true bugs

Zamolxis is a genus of assassin bugs (family Reduviidae), in the subfamily Harpactorinae.

== Species ==
- Zamolxis gracilis (Stål 1855)
- Zamolxis pallidiventris (Germar 1837)
