= Vitumnus =

Scientific classification
- Kingdom: Animalia
- Phylum: Arthropoda
- Clade: Pancrustacea
- Class: Insecta
- Order: Hemiptera
- Suborder: Heteroptera
- Family: Reduviidae
- Tribe: Harpactorini
- Genus: Vitumnus; Stål, 1865

Species
- See text

Genus of true bugs

Vitumnus is a genus of assassin bugs (family Reduviidae), in the subfamily Harpactorinae.

== Species ==
- Vitumnus leoninus Bergroth, 1907
- Vitumnus oculatus Stål, 1865
- Vitumnus scenicus (Stål, 1855)
