= Ulpius =

Scientific classification
- Kingdom: Animalia
- Phylum: Arthropoda
- Class: Insecta
- Order: Hemiptera
- Suborder: Heteroptera
- Infraorder: Cimicomorpha
- Family: Reduviidae
- Subfamily: Harpactorinae
- Tribe: Harpactorini
- Genus: Ulpius; Stål, 1865

Species
- See text

Genus of true bugs

Ulpius is a genus of assassin bugs (family Reduviidae), in the subfamily Harpactorinae.

== Species ==
- Ulpius bicolor Distant, 1879
- Ulpius bigibbulus Horváth, 1914
- Ulpius festivus Distant, 1879
- Ulpius grandituber Bergroth, 1906
- Ulpius guttiventris Horváth, 1914
- Ulpius nodosipes (Signoret, 1860)
- Ulpius obscurus Distant, 1879
- Ulpius tuberosus Horváth, 1914
- Ulpius tumidiceps Horváth, 1914
