= Pisilus =

Scientific classification
- Kingdom: Animalia
- Phylum: Arthropoda
- Clade: Pancrustacea
- Class: Insecta
- Order: Hemiptera
- Suborder: Heteroptera
- Family: Reduviidae
- Subfamily: Harpactorinae
- Tribe: Harpactorini
- Genus: Pisilus; Stål, 1858
- Species: P. tipuliformis

Binomial name
- Pisilus tipuliformis (Fabricius, 1794)

Genus of true bugs

Pisilus tipuliformis is a species of assassin bug in the subfamily Harpactorinae. It is the only species in the genus Pisilus. The females of this species exhibit maternal care, and can distinguish their own eggs from other females of the same species.
