= Acholla (bug) =

Scientific classification
- Kingdom: Animalia
- Phylum: Arthropoda
- Clade: Pancrustacea
- Class: Insecta
- Order: Hemiptera
- Suborder: Heteroptera
- Family: Reduviidae
- Tribe: Harpactorini
- Genus: Acholla; Stål, 1862

Genus of true bugs

Acholla is a genus of assassin bugs in the family Reduviidae. There are at least three described species in Acholla, found in North America.

== Species ==
These three species belong to the genus Acholla.

- Acholla ampliata Stål, 1872
- Acholla multispinosa (De Geer, 1773)
- Acholla tabida (Stål, 1862)
