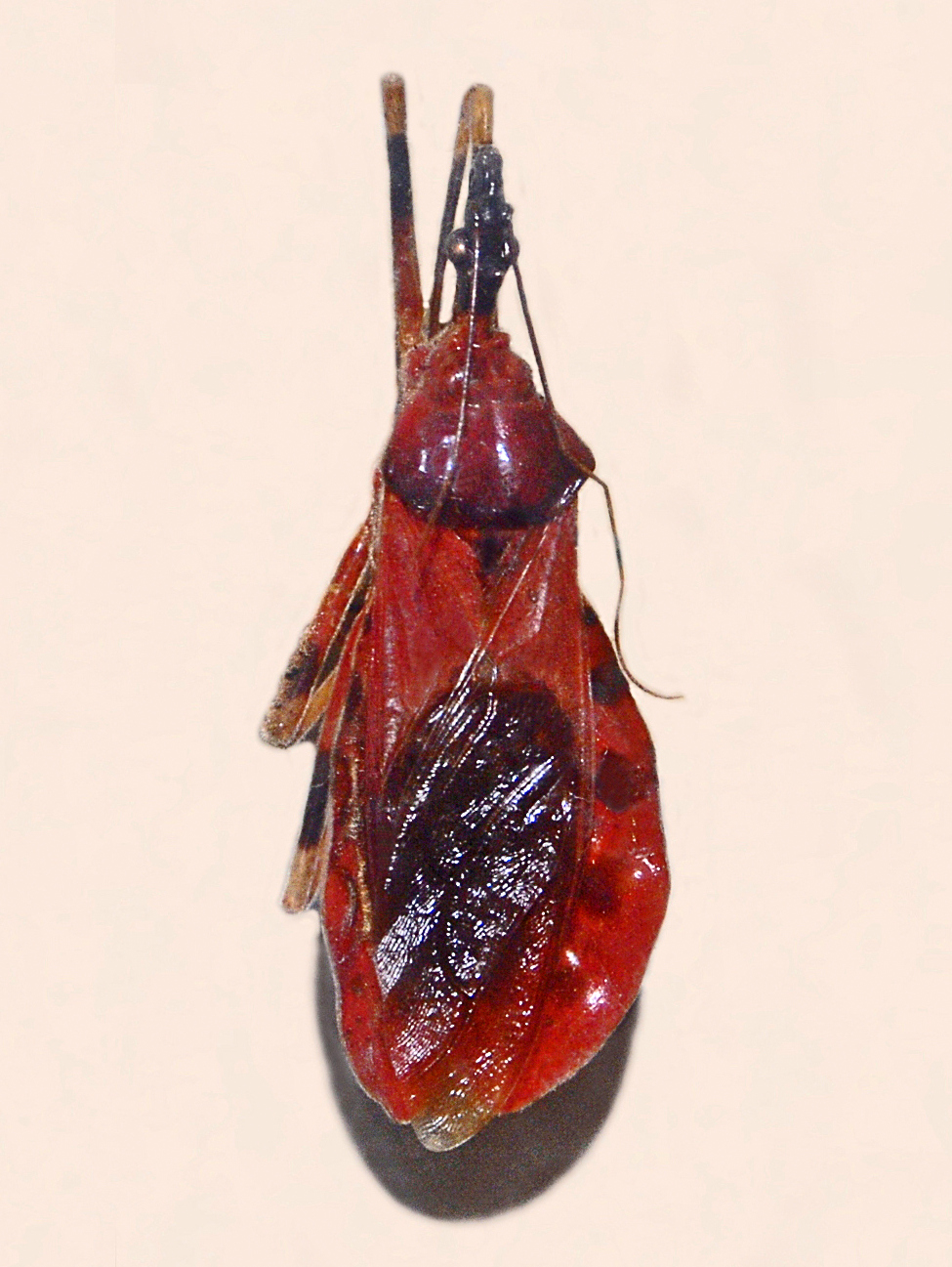
- Eulyes amoena

Scientific classification
- Kingdom: Animalia
- Phylum: Arthropoda
- Class: Insecta
- Order: Hemiptera
- Suborder: Heteroptera
- Family: Reduviidae
- Subfamily: Harpactorinae
- Tribe: Harpactorini
- Genus: Eulyes; Amyot & Serville, 1843

= Eulyes =

Genus of true bugs

Eulyes is a genus of true assassin bugs belonging to the family Reduviidae.

== Species ==
- Eulyes amoena (Guérin, 1838)
- Eulyes bellula Miller, 1948
- Eulyes illustris Stål, 1863
- Eulyes melanoptera Dohrn, 1859
- Eulyes preciosa Dohrn, 1859
- Eulyes regalis Miller, 1953
- Eulyes sanguinolentus Distant, 1903
- Eulyes superba Breddin, 1901
