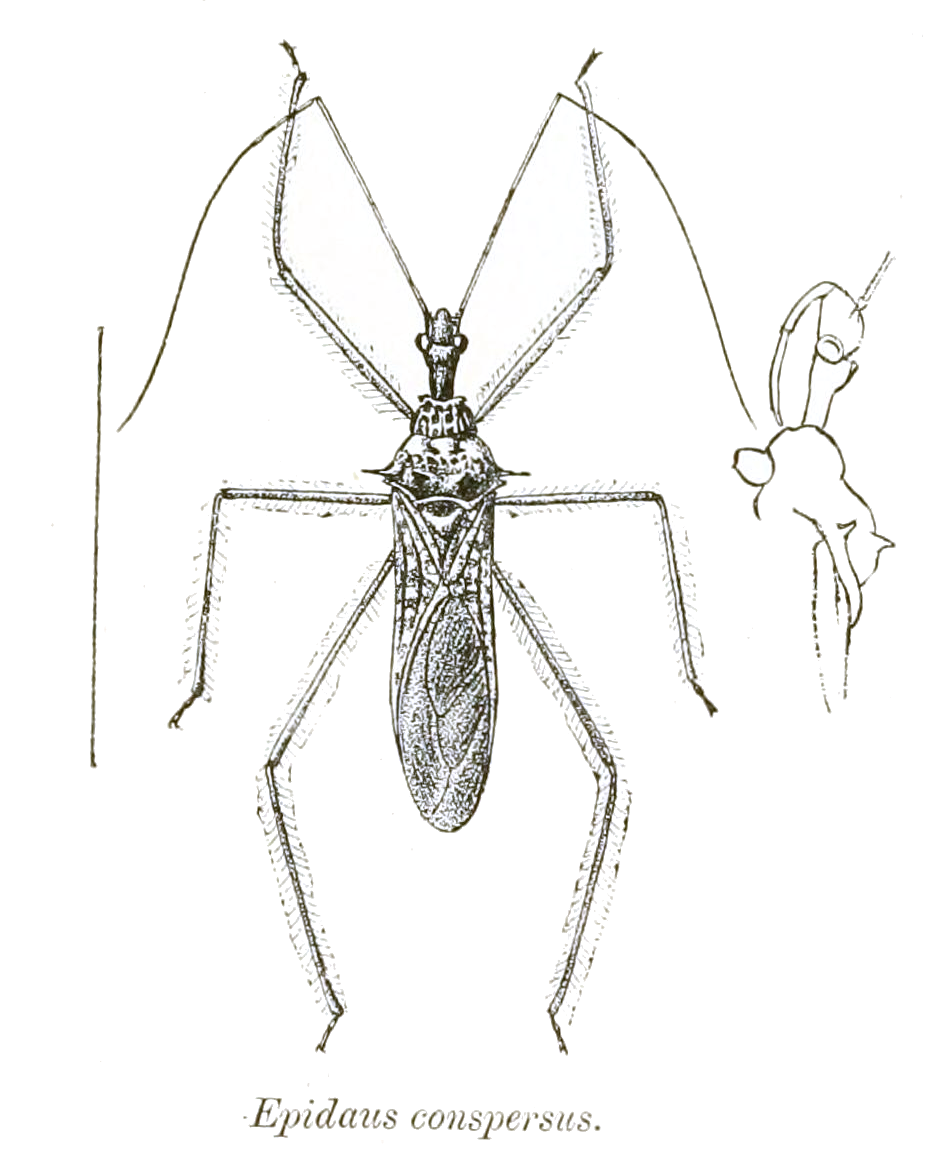
- Epidaus conspersus

Scientific classification
- Kingdom: Animalia
- Phylum: Arthropoda
- Class: Insecta
- Order: Hemiptera
- Suborder: Heteroptera
- Family: Reduviidae
- Tribe: Harpactorini
- Genus: Epidaus; Stål, 1859

Type species
- Zelus transversus Burmeister, 1835

= Epidaus =

Genus of true bugs

Epidaus is a genus of assassin bugs with about 25 species mainly distributed in the Oriental Realm with two species (E. nebulo and E. tuberosus) which extend into the Palearctic Realm. Most species have a long and narrow body with the pronotum having a posterior margin with raised corners and spiny outgrowths facing outwards. The head a tubercle behind the base of each of the two antennae.

Species included in the genus include:

- Epidaus alternus Bergroth, 1915
- Epidaus atrispinus Distant, 1904
- Epidaus bachmaensis Truong, Zhao and Cai, 2006
- Epidaus bicolor Distant, 1903
- Epidaus compressispinus Breddin, 1900
- Epidaus connectens Distant, 1919
- Epidaus conspersus Stål, 1863
- Epidaus famulus (Stål, 1863)
- Epidaus furculatus Stål, 1863
- Epidaus incomptus Miller, 1941
- Epidaus insularis Zhang, Zhao, Cao and Cai, 2010
- Epidaus kedahensis Miller, 1941
- Epidaus latispinus Stål, 1863
- Epidaus longispinus Hsiao, 1979
- Epidaus maculiger Stål, 1859
- Epidaus nebulo (Stål, 1863)
- Epidaus pantolabus Miller, 1941
- Epidaus parvus Distant, 1904
- Epidaus pellax Miller, 1941
- Epidaus pretiosus Distant, 1903
- Epidaus sexspinus Hsiao, 1979
- Epidaus transversus (Burmeister, 1835)
- Epidaus tuberosus Yang, 1940
- Epidaus validispinus Stål, 1863
- Epidaus wangi Chen, Zhu, Wang and Cai, 2016
