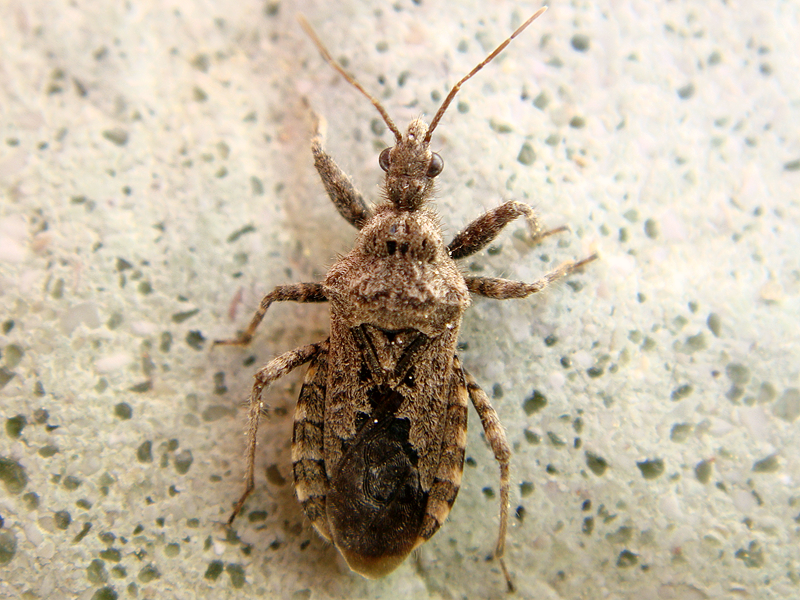
- Coranus griseus

Scientific classification
- Domain: Eukaryota
- Kingdom: Animalia
- Phylum: Arthropoda
- Class: Insecta
- Order: Hemiptera
- Suborder: Heteroptera
- Family: Reduviidae
- Subfamily: Harpactorinae
- Tribe: Harpactorini
- Genus: Coranus; Curtis, 1833

Synonyms
- Austrocoranus Miller, 1954; Chathaphus Amyot & Serville, 1843; Colliocoris Hahn, 1834; Eyreocoris Miller, 1951; Velinoides Matsumura, 1913

= Coranus =

Genus of true bugs

Coranus is a genus of assassin bugs in the tribe Harpactorini.

== Species ==
The following species are included:

- Coranus aegyptius (Fabricius, 1775)
- Coranus aethiops Jakovlev, 1893
- Coranus ambrosii Livingstone & Ravichandran, 1989
- Coranus angulatus Stål, 1842
- Coranus arenaceus Walker, 1870
- Coranus aridellus Malipatil, 1986
- Coranus atricapillus Distant, 1903
- Coranus bicoloratus Malipatil, 1986
- Coranus blandus Jakovlev, 1905
- Coranus callosus Stål, 1874
- Coranus carbonarius (Stål, 1855)
- Coranus carinata Livingstone & Ravichandran, 1989
- Coranus chanceli Bergevin, 1932
- Coranus cheesmanae Miller, 1958
- Coranus choui Lu & Cai, 1989
- Coranus contrarius Reuter, 1881
- Coranus dalyensis Malipatil, 1986
- Coranus decoratus Schouteden, 1932
- Coranus dilatatus (Matsumura, 1913)
- Coranus distinctus (Miller, 1951)
- Coranus dohertyi Miller, 1958
- Coranus dulichoides Villiers, 1965
- Coranus dybovskii Villiers, 1948
- Coranus elegans Schouteden, 1952
- Coranus emodicus Kiritschenko, 1931
- Coranus erythraeus (Stål, 1863)
- Coranus espanoli Wagner, 1950
- Coranus fieberi Puton, 1861
- Coranus flavicornis Villiers, 1963
- Coranus flavostictus Miller, 1941
- Coranus fuscatus Malipatil, 1986
- Coranus fuscilineatus Malipatil, 1986
- Coranus fuscipennis Reuter, 1881
- Coranus fuscolineatus Malipatil, 1986
- Coranus granosus Stål, 1874
- Coranus griseus (Rossi, 1790)
- Coranus guineensis Tordo, 1974
- Coranus guttatus Ren, 1984
- Coranus hammarstroemi Reuter, 1892
- Coranus hermelini Villiers, 1964
- Coranus kerzhneri Putshkov, 1964
- Coranus kiritshenkoi Bergevin, 1932
- Coranus lateralis Jakovlev, 1879
- Coranus lateritius (Stål, 1859)
- Coranus laticeps Wagner, 1952
- Coranus lativentris Jakovlev, 1890
- Coranus lindbergi Dispons, 1963
- Coranus lippensi Schouteden, 1944
- Coranus longiceps Bergroth, 1892
- Coranus lugubris Stål, 1865
- Coranus macellus Villiers, 1954
- Coranus madagascariensis (Signoret, 1860)
- Coranus magnus Hsiao & Ren, 1981
- Coranus marginatus Hsiao, 1979
- Coranus mateui Wagner, 1952
- Coranus metallicus Lethierry, 1883
- Coranus militaris Distant, 1919
- Coranus minusculus Breddin, 1912
- Coranus monteithi Malipatil, 1986
- Coranus monticolus Miller, 1950
- Coranus mucidus Schumacher, 1913
- Coranus mundus (Miller, 1954)
- Coranus neotropicalis Kirkaldy, 1909
- Coranus niger (Rambur, 1840)
- Coranus nigerrimus Miller, 1956
- Coranus nigritus Malipatil, 1986
- Coranus nimbensis Villiers, 1967
- Coranus nodulosus Ambrose & Sahayaraj, 1993
- Coranus nossibeensis Reuter, 1887
- Coranus oblongiceps Stål, 1865
- Coranus pallidiventris Villiers, 1948
- Coranus pallidus Reuter, 1881
- Coranus papillosus (Thunberg, 1822)
- Coranus parviceps Breddin, 1913
- Coranus pectoralis Jakovlev, 1883
- Coranus pericarti P.V. Putshkov, 1994
- Coranus persicus Wagner, 1952
- Coranus pirzadae China & Miller, 1950
- Coranus priesneri Miller, 1951
- Coranus pullus (Stål, 1855)
- Coranus reuteri Schouteden, 1910
- Coranus rubripennis Reuter, 1881
- Coranus rubrolimbatus Miller, 1950
- Coranus rugosicollis Puton, 1888
- Coranus ruthii Livingstone & Ravichandran, 1989
- Coranus sahlbergi Wagner, 1954
- Coranus sichuensis Hsiao & Ren, 1981
- Coranus siva Kirkaldy, 1891
- Coranus soosaii Ambrose & Vennison, 1989
- Coranus sordidus Miller, 1956
- Coranus spiniscutis Reuter, 1881
- Coranus squamipennis Miller, 1941
- Coranus stenopygus Putshkov, 1982
- Coranus subapterus (De Geer, 1773)
- Coranus sydnicus (Mayr, 1866)
- Coranus tagalicus (Stål, 1859)
- Coranus tibetensis China, 1940
- Coranus trabeatus Horváth, 1902
- Coranus tuberculifer Reuter, 1881
- Coranus varipes Stål, 1865
- Coranus ventralis Lethierry, 1880
- Coranus vestitus Villiers, 1972
- Coranus viduus Miller, 1950
- Coranus vilhenai Villiers, 1952
- Coranus villosus Miller, 1950
- Coranus vitellinus Distant, 1919
- Coranus westraliensis Malipatil, 1986
- Coranus wolffi Lethierry & Severin, 1801
- Coranus woodroffei P. V. Putshkov, 1982
- Coranus zibanicus Dispons, 1953

== See also ==
- List of heteropteran bugs recorded in Britain
