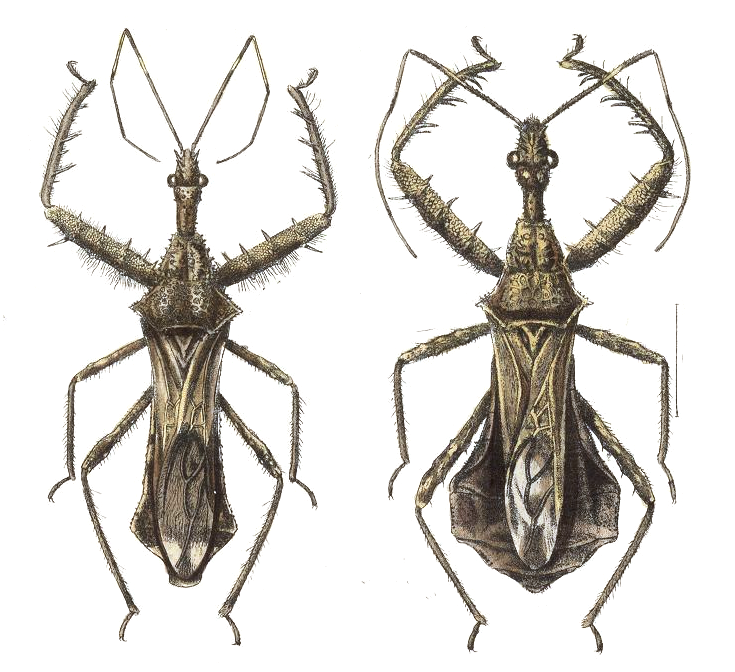
- Sinea coronata male and female

Scientific classification
- Domain: Eukaryota
- Kingdom: Animalia
- Phylum: Arthropoda
- Class: Insecta
- Order: Hemiptera
- Suborder: Heteroptera
- Family: Reduviidae
- Tribe: Harpactorini
- Genus: Sinea; Amyot & Serville, 1843

Species
- See text

= Sinea =

Genus of true bugs

Sinea is a New World genus of assassin bugs, in the subfamily Harpactorinae. 13 species have been described, mostly from the Southwestern United States and Central America.

See Sinea diadema for more detail about a representative species.

== List of species ==
- Sinea anacantha Hussey, 1953
- Sinea complexa Caudell, 1900
- Sinea confusa Caudell, 1901
- Sinea coronata Stål, 1862
- Sinea defecta Stål, 1862
- Sinea diadema (Fabricius, 1776) – spined assassin bug
- Sinea integra Stål 1862
- Sinea raptoria Stål, 1862
- Sinea rileyi Montandon, 1893
- Sinea sanguisuga Stål, 1862
- Sinea sericea Hussey 1953
- Sinea spinipes (Herrich-Schaeffer, 1846)
- Sinea undulata Uhler, 1894
- Sinea incognita Bundy
