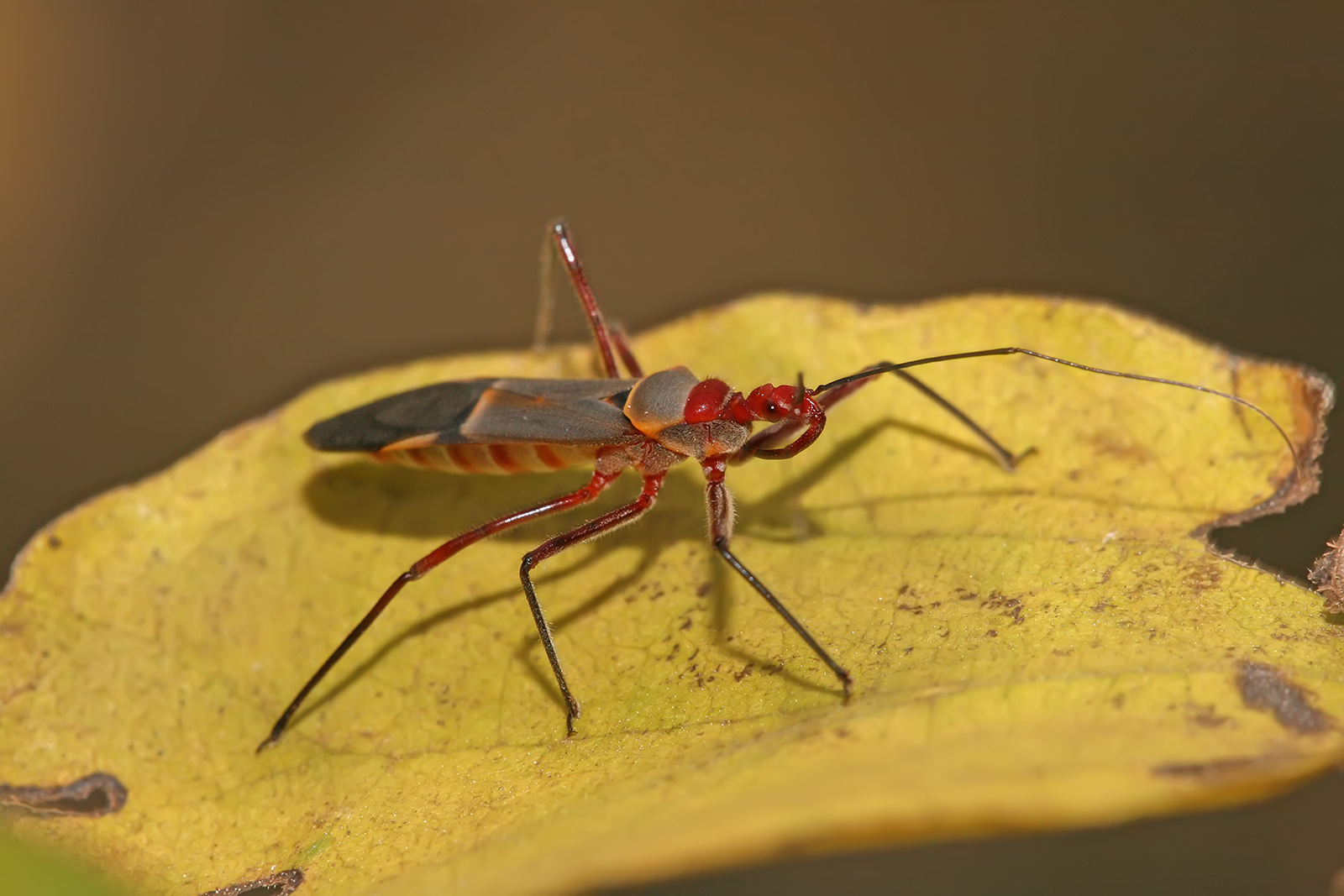

Scientific classification
- Kingdom: Animalia
- Phylum: Arthropoda
- Clade: Pancrustacea
- Class: Insecta
- Order: Hemiptera
- Suborder: Heteroptera
- Family: Reduviidae
- Tribe: Harpactorini
- Genus: Castolus; Stål, 1858

= Castolus =

Genus of true bugs

Castolus is a genus of assassin bugs in the family Reduviidae. There are about 16 described species in Castolus.

== Species ==
These 16 species belong to the genus Castolus:

- Castolus annulatus Maldonado & Brailovsky, 1992-01
- Castolus bicolor Maldonado, 1976
- Castolus bolivari Brailovsky, 1982
- Castolus ferox (Banks, 1910)
- Castolus fuscoapicatus (Stål, 1860)
- Castolus lineatus Maldonado, 1976
- Castolus multicinctus Stål, 1872
- Castolus nigriventris Breddin, 1904
- Castolus pallidus Maldonado, 1976
- Castolus pecus
- Castolus plagiaticollis Stål, 1858
- Castolus rufomarginatus Champion, 1899
- Castolus spissicornis (Stål, 1860)
- Castolus subinermis (Stål, 1862)
- Castolus tricolor Champion, 1899
- Castolus trinotatus (Stål, 1866)
