= Domnus =

Scientific classification
- Kingdom: Animalia
- Phylum: Arthropoda
- Class: Insecta
- Order: Hemiptera
- Suborder: Heteroptera
- Family: Reduviidae
- Tribe: Harpactorini
- Genus: Domnus; Stål, 1858

Species
- See text

Genus of true bugs

Domnus is a genus of assassin bug (family Reduviidae), in the subfamily Harpactorinae.

== Species ==
- Domnus coloratus Distant, 1903
- Domnus condamini Villiers, 1963
- Domnus dimidiatus (Stål, 1855)
- Domnus flavoniger (Stål, 1858)
