= Yolinus =

Scientific classification
- Kingdom: Animalia
- Phylum: Arthropoda
- Class: Insecta
- Order: Hemiptera
- Suborder: Heteroptera
- Family: Reduviidae
- Subfamily: Harpactorinae
- Tribe: Harpactorini
- Genus: Yolinus; Amyot & Serville, 1843

Genus of true bugs

Yolinus is a genus of Asian assassin bugs in the tribe Harpactorini; it was erected by Charles Jean-Baptiste Amyot and Jean Guillaume Audinet-Serville in 1843. Species have been recorded from Japan, China and Indochina.

== Species ==
The Global Biodiversity Information Facility includes:

1. Yolinus albigutta Walker, 1873
2. Yolinus albopustulatus China, 1940
3. Yolinus ampliventris Stål, 1863
4. Yolinus annulicornis Hsiao, 1979
5. Yolinus baro Stål, 1863
6. Yolinus clarus Miller, 1941
7. Yolinus conspicuus Distant, 1903
8. Yolinus fuliginosus Stål, 1866
9. Yolinus glagoviae Dohrn, 1859
10. Yolinus mouhoti Distant, 1903
11. Yolinus schmitzi Miller, 1941
12. Yolinus siamicus Walker, 1873
13. Yolinus sufflatus Amyot & Serville, 1843
14. Yolinus sycanoides Breddin, 1901
