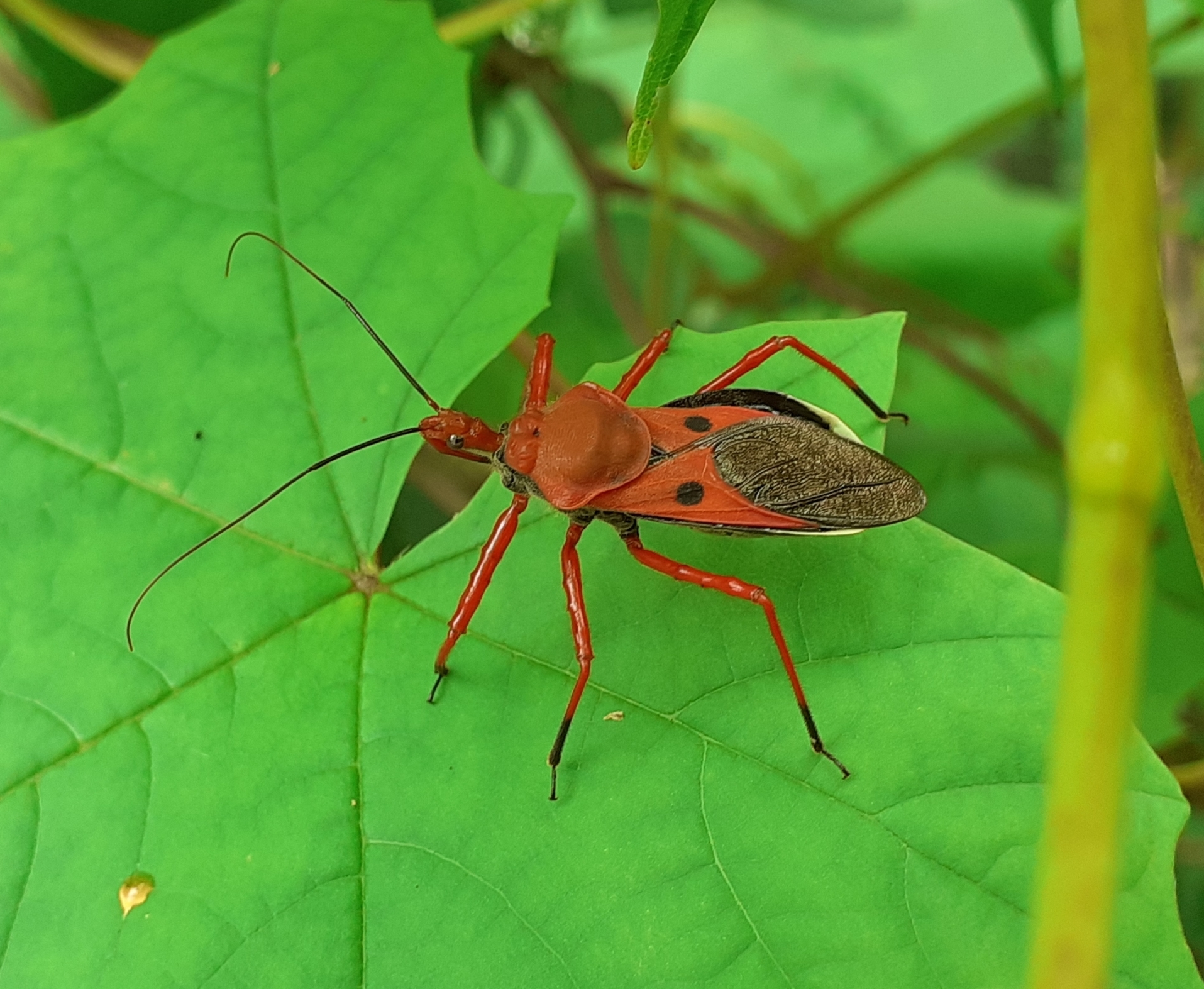
- Panthous bimaculatus

Scientific classification
- Kingdom: Animalia
- Phylum: Arthropoda
- Class: Insecta
- Order: Hemiptera
- Suborder: Heteroptera
- Family: Reduviidae
- Tribe: Harpactorini
- Genus: Panthous; Stål, 1863

Species
- See text

= Panthous (bug) =

Genus of true bugs

Panthous is a genus of Asian assassin bugs (family Reduviidae), in the subfamily Harpactorinae.

== Species ==
- Panthous bimaculatus Distant, 1903
- Panthous cocalus Distant, 1882
- Panthous contrarius Miller, 1941
- Panthous daedalus Stål, 1863
- Panthous ectinoderoides Bergroth, 1913
- Panthous excellens Stål, 1863
- Panthous icarus Stål, 1863
- Panthous illustris Miller, 1941
- Panthous limboguttatus Reuter, 1881
- Panthous minos Breddin, 1900
- Panthous nigriceps Reuter, 1881
- Panthous ochromelas Stål, 1863
- Panthous ruber Hsiao, 1979
- Panthous speculator Miller, 1948
- Panthous talus Distant, 1882
- Panthous tarsatus Distant, 1903
- Panthous theseus Breddin, 1900
- Panthous vegetus Miller, 1941
