= Astinus =

Scientific classification
- Kingdom: Animalia
- Phylum: Arthropoda
- Clade: Pancrustacea
- Class: Insecta
- Order: Hemiptera
- Suborder: Heteroptera
- Family: Reduviidae
- Tribe: Harpactorini
- Genus: Astinus; Stål, 1859

Species
- See text

Genus of true bugs

Astinus is a genus of assassin bug (family Reduviidae), in the subfamily Harpactorinae.

== Species ==
- Astinus intermedius Miller, 1954
- Astinus m-album (Amyot & Serville, 1843)
- Astinus nebulo Miller, 1941
- Astinus pustulatus Stål, 1863
- Astinus siamensis Distant, 1903
