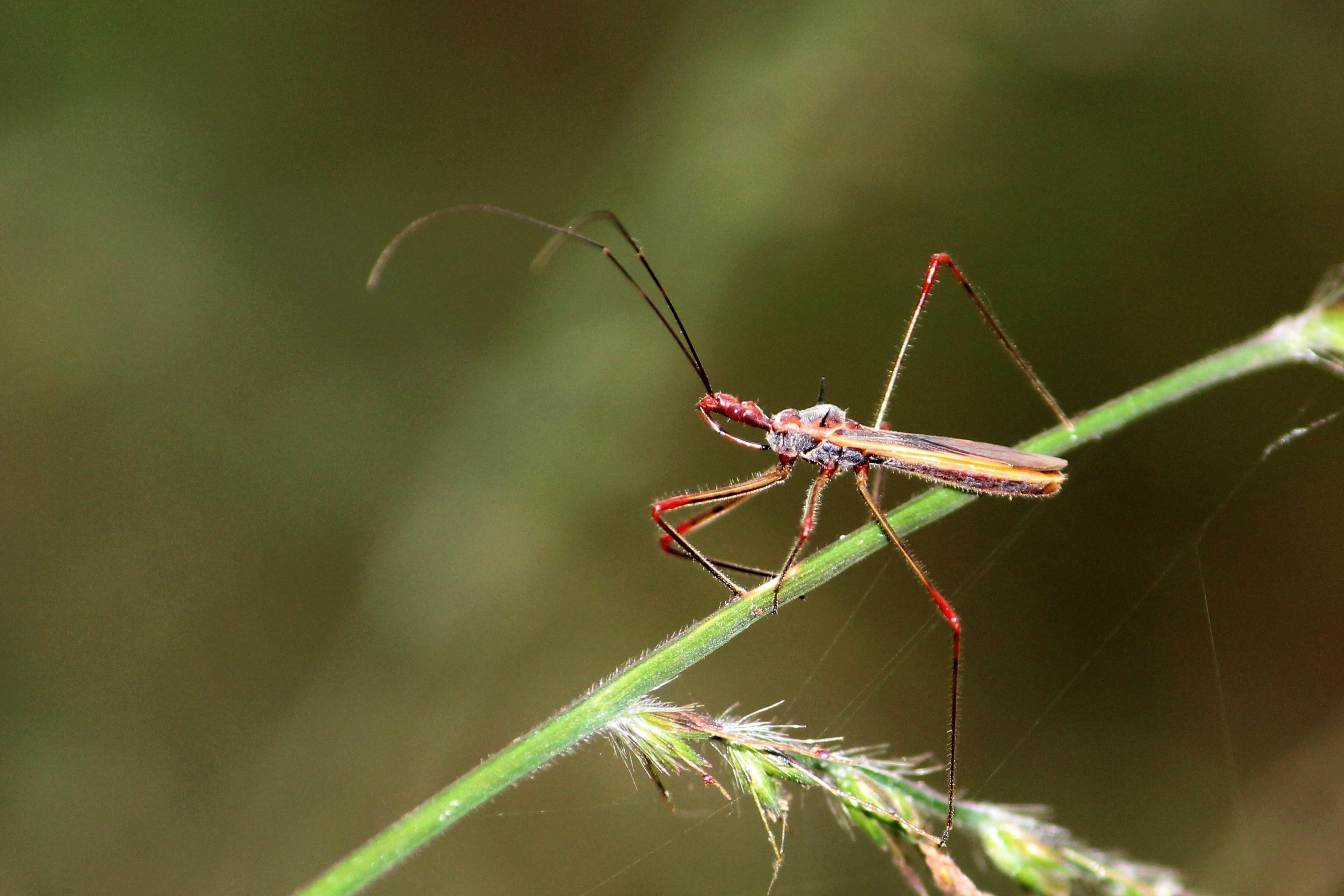
- Repipta sp.

Scientific classification
- Kingdom: Animalia
- Phylum: Arthropoda
- Class: Insecta
- Order: Hemiptera
- Suborder: Heteroptera
- Family: Reduviidae
- Tribe: Harpactorini
- Genus: Repipta; Stål, 1859

Species
- See text

= Repipta =

Genus of true bugs

Repipta is a mostly neotropical genus of assassin bug, family (Reduviidae), in the subfamily Harpactorinae.

== Partial list of species ==
- Repipta annulipes Barber, 1925
- Repipta flavicans
- Repipta taurus
