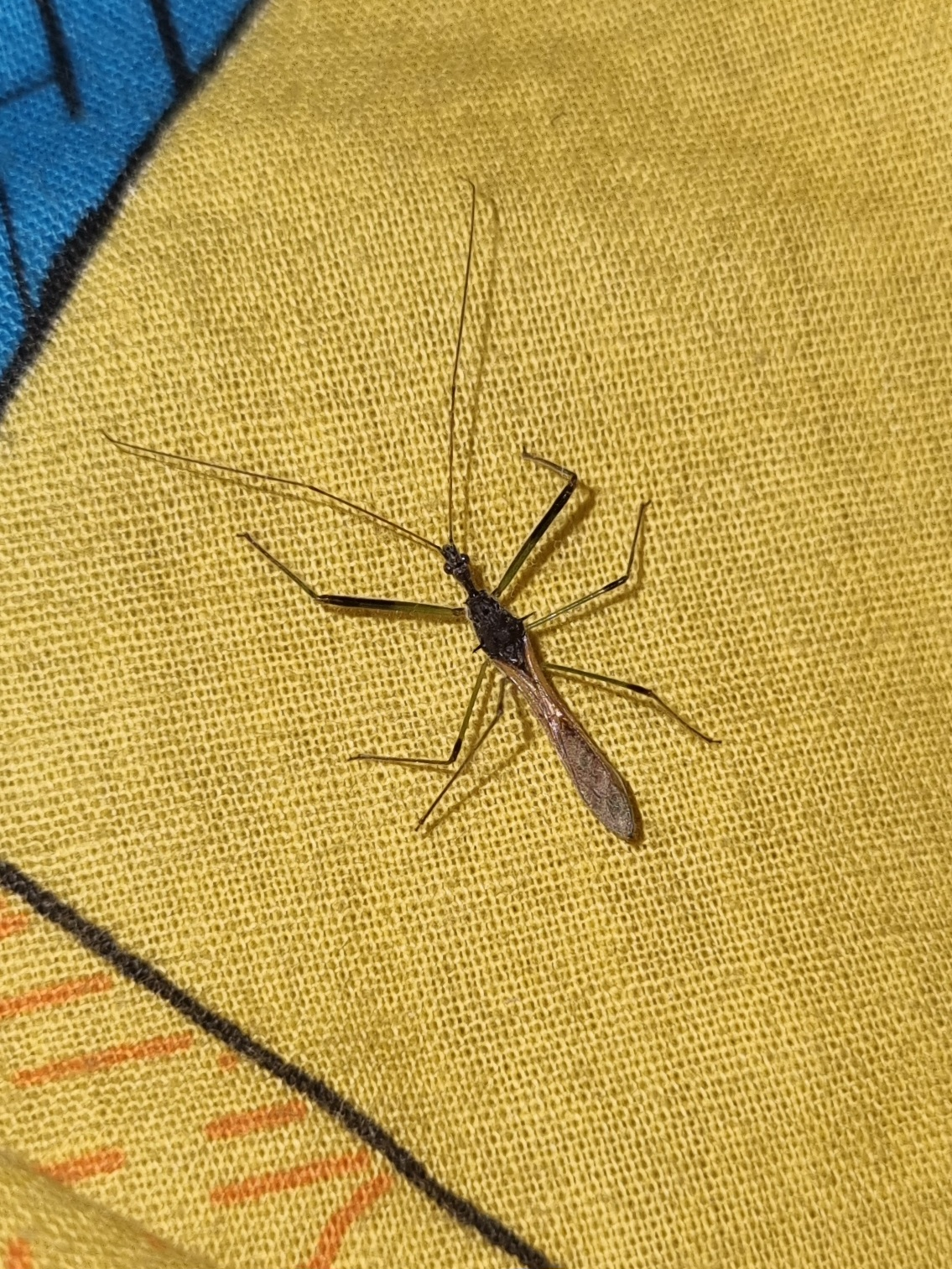

Scientific classification
- Domain: Eukaryota
- Kingdom: Animalia
- Phylum: Arthropoda
- Class: Insecta
- Order: Hemiptera
- Suborder: Heteroptera
- Family: Reduviidae
- Genus: Dalytra
- Species: D. spinifex

Binomial name
- Dalytra spinifex (Thunberg, 1783)

Synonyms
- Alcmena spinifex

= Dalytra spinifex =

Species of true bug

Dalytra spinifex is a species of assassin bug in the subfamily Harpactorinae.
