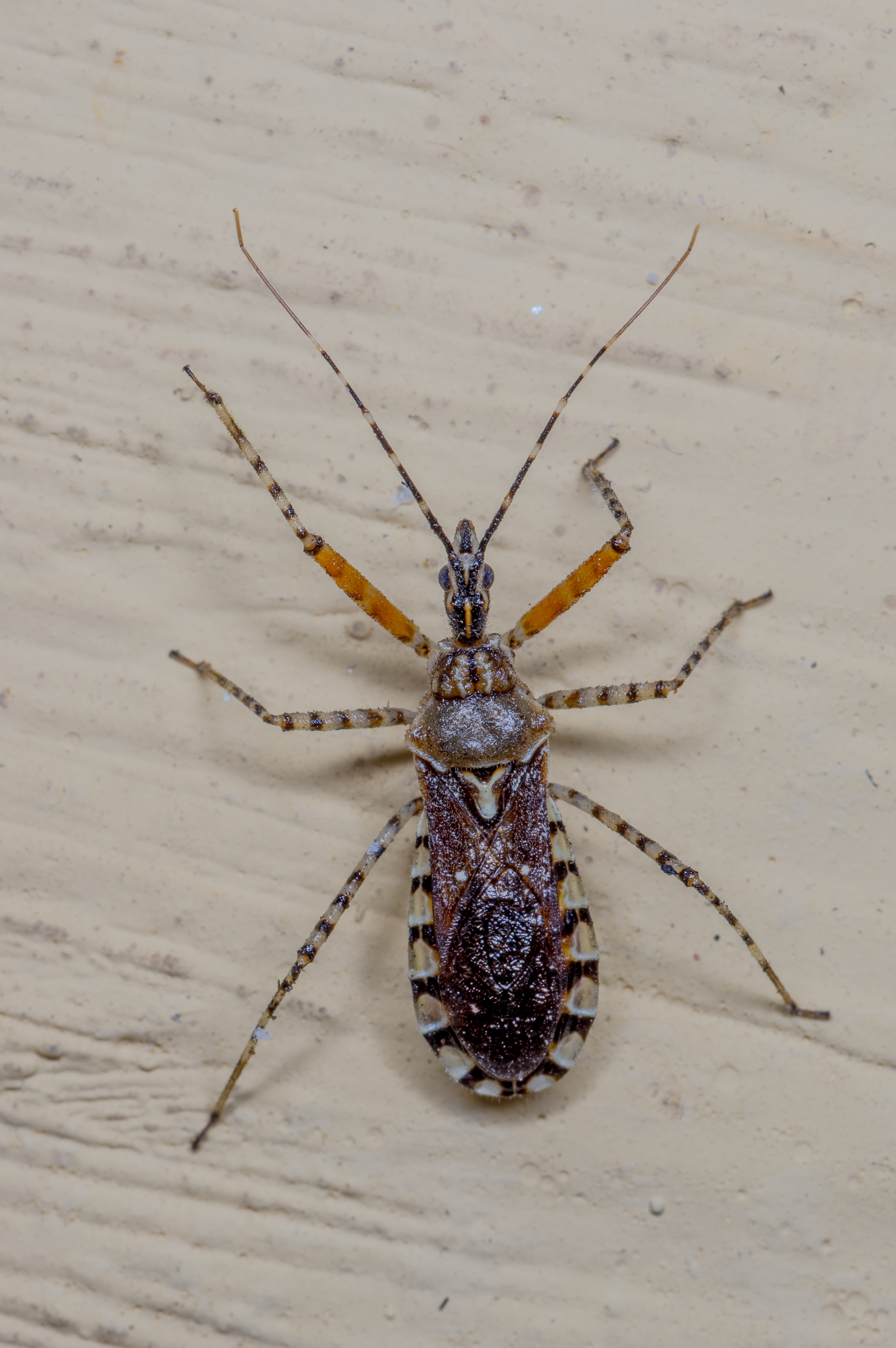

Scientific classification
- Domain: Eukaryota
- Kingdom: Animalia
- Phylum: Arthropoda
- Class: Insecta
- Order: Hemiptera
- Suborder: Heteroptera
- Family: Reduviidae
- Genus: Cosmoclopius
- Species: C. nigroannulatus

Binomial name
- Cosmoclopius nigroannulatus Stål

= Cosmoclopius nigroannulatus =

Species of true bug

Cosmoclopius nigroannulatus is a species of assassin bug family (Reduviidae), in the subfamily Harpactorinae. It is a predator of pests in tobacco fields. Its main prey is the tobacco grayish bug, Spartocera dentiventris. although it is also known to feed on Myzus persicae and Macrosiphum euphorbiae aphids, as well as Epitrix and Diabrotica speciosa beetles.

== Life history ==
Females require a period of time to mature their reproductive organs after emergence.
