= Vatinius =

Scientific classification
- Domain: Eukaryota
- Kingdom: Animalia
- Phylum: Arthropoda
- Class: Insecta
- Order: Hemiptera
- Suborder: Heteroptera
- Family: Reduviidae
- Tribe: Harpactorini
- Genus: Vatinius; Stål, 1865

Species
- See text

Genus of true bugs

Vatinius is a genus of African assassin bugs (family Reduviidae), in the tribe Harpactorini, erected by Carl Stål in 1865.

== Species ==
The Global Biodiversity Information Facility includes:

1. Vatinius basilewskyi Villiers, 1962
2. Vatinius desaegeri Schouteden, 1952
3. Vatinius gouini Villiers, 1955
4. Vatinius kivuensis Schouteden, 1952
5. Vatinius ochropus (Stål, 1855)
6. Vatinius overlaeti Schouteden, 1932
7. Vatinius rhodesianus (Miller, 1950)
8. Vatinius usambarensis Schouteden, 1932
