= Platerus =

Scientific classification
- Domain: Eukaryota
- Kingdom: Animalia
- Phylum: Arthropoda
- Class: Insecta
- Order: Hemiptera
- Suborder: Heteroptera
- Family: Reduviidae
- Tribe: Harpactorini
- Genus: Platerus; Distant, 1903

Species
- See text

Genus of true bugs

Platerus is a genus of assassin bugs (family Reduviidae), in the subfamily Harpactorinae.

== Species ==
- Platerus bhavanii Livingstone & Ravichandran, 1991
- Platerus pilcheri Distant, 1903
- Platerus tenuicorpis P. Zhao, C.W. Yang & Cai, 2006
