= Acholla multispinosa =

Scientific classification
- Domain: Eukaryota
- Kingdom: Animalia
- Phylum: Arthropoda
- Class: Insecta
- Order: Hemiptera
- Suborder: Heteroptera
- Family: Reduviidae
- Genus: Acholla
- Species: A. multispinosa

Binomial name
- Acholla multispinosa (De Geer, 1773)

Synonyms
- Acholla sexspinosus (Wolff, 1802)

Species of true bug

Acholla multispinosa is a species of assassin bug in the family Reduviidae. It is found in North America.
