= Sinea spinipes =

Scientific classification
- Kingdom: Animalia
- Phylum: Arthropoda
- Class: Insecta
- Order: Hemiptera
- Suborder: Heteroptera
- Family: Reduviidae
- Genus: Sinea
- Species: S. spinipes

Binomial name
- Sinea spinipes (Herrich-Schaeffer, 1846)

Species of true bug

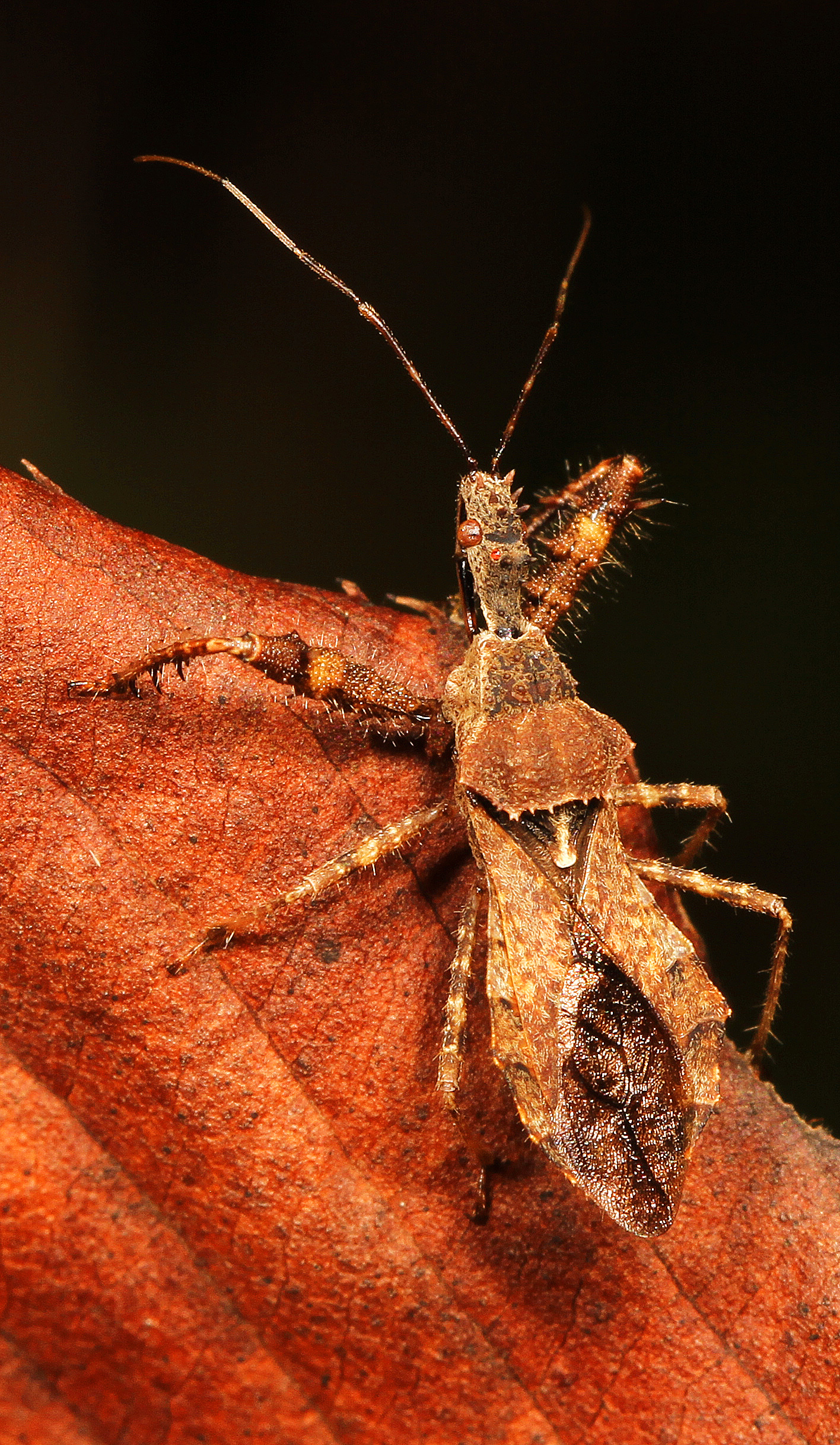
Sinea spinipes, Julie Metz Wetlands, Woodbridge, Virginia.

Sinea spinipes is a species of assassin bug, family (Reduviidae), in the subfamily Harpactorinae. It is native to North America and found in the midwest along roadsides, forest edges, and open fields with scattered trees.

In southern Illinois S. spinipes is univoltine (has only one brood per year).
