= Coilopus =

Scientific classification
- Kingdom: Animalia
- Phylum: Arthropoda
- Class: Insecta
- Order: Hemiptera
- Suborder: Heteroptera
- Family: Reduviidae
- Tribe: Harpactorini
- Genus: Coilopus

Species
- See Text

Genus of insects

Coilopus is a genus of the assassin bug family (Reduviidae), in the subfamily Harpactorinae. Species of this genus mimic wasps of the genus Vespa.

== Partial list of species ==
- Coilopus vellus
- Coilopus crabus
