= Dalytra =

Scientific classification
- Kingdom: Animalia
- Phylum: Arthropoda
- Clade: Pancrustacea
- Class: Insecta
- Order: Hemiptera
- Suborder: Heteroptera
- Family: Reduviidae
- Tribe: Harpactorini
- Genus: Dalytra; Stål, 1861

Type species
- Zelus rapax Stål, 1859

Species
- See text

Synonyms
- Alcmena Stål, 1859 (Homonym); Bartacus Distant, 1904; Dalyrta Stål, 1865 (Misspelling)

Genus of true bugs

Dalytra is a genus of assassin bugs (family Reduviidae), in the subfamily Harpactorinae.

== Species ==
- Dalytra culani (Fernando, 1958)
- Dalytra maculosa (Distant, 1904)
- Dalytra rapax (Stål, 1859)
- Dalytra spinifex (Thunberg, 1783)
- Dalytra straminipes (Distant, 1904)
