= Aga albomarginalis =

Scientific classification
- Domain: Eukaryota
- Kingdom: Animalia
- Phylum: Arthropoda
- Class: Insecta
- Order: Hemiptera
- Suborder: Heteroptera
- Family: Reduviidae
- Subfamily: Harpactorinae
- Tribe: Harpactorini
- Genus: Aga; Distant, 1910
- Species: A. albomarginalis

Binomial name
- Aga albomarginalis Distant, 1910

Genus of true bugs

Aga is a genus of assassin bugs (family Reduviidae), in the subfamily Harpactorinae, containing a single described species, Aga albomarginalis.
