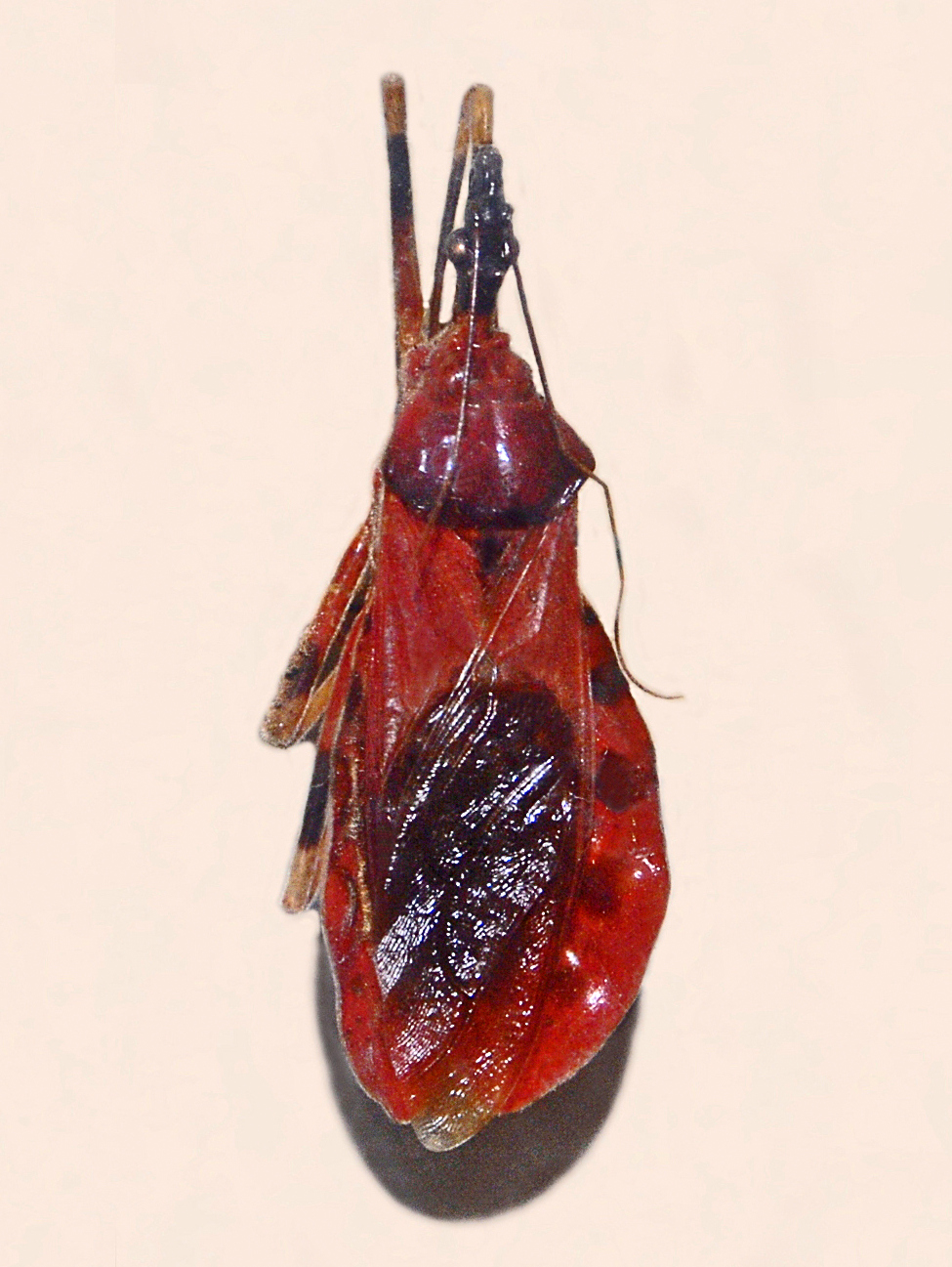
- Eulyes amoena from Nias Island

Scientific classification
- Kingdom: Animalia
- Phylum: Arthropoda
- Class: Insecta
- Order: Hemiptera
- Suborder: Heteroptera
- Family: Reduviidae
- Genus: Eulyes
- Species: E. amoena

Binomial name
- Eulyes amoena (Guérin, 1838)

= Eulyes amoena =

Species of true bug

Eulyes amoena is a species of true assassin bug belonging to the family Reduviidae.

== Description ==
Eulyes amoena shows an aposematic black and red coloration. The black and red nymphs of these assassin bugs are mimicked by the nymph of the orchid mantis (Hymenopus coronatus) .

== Distribution ==
This species is widespread in Indonesia (Borneo, Sumatra and Java).
