= Cosmoclopius =

Scientific classification
- Domain: Eukaryota
- Kingdom: Animalia
- Phylum: Arthropoda
- Class: Insecta
- Order: Hemiptera
- Suborder: Heteroptera
- Family: Reduviidae
- Tribe: Harpactorini
- Genus: Cosmoclopius; Stål, 1866

Species
- See text

Genus of true bugs

Cosmoclopius is a genus of South American assassin bugs (insects in the family Reduviidae), in the subfamily Harpactorinae.

7 species have been described.

== Partial list of species ==
- Cosmoclopius curacavensis Cobben and Wygodzinsky 1975
- Cosmoclopius nigroannulatus Stål
