= Doldina =

Scientific classification
- Kingdom: Animalia
- Phylum: Arthropoda
- Clade: Pancrustacea
- Class: Insecta
- Order: Hemiptera
- Suborder: Heteroptera
- Family: Reduviidae
- Subfamily: Harpactorinae
- Tribe: Harpactorini
- Genus: Doldina; Stål, 1859

Genus of true bugs

Doldina is a genus of assassin bugs in the family Reduviidae. There are about eight described species in Doldina.

== Species ==
These eight species belong to the genus Doldina:

- Doldina bicarinata Stål, 1866
- Doldina carinulata Stål, 1859
- Doldina cubana Barber & Bruner, 1946
- Doldina interjungens Bergroth, 1913
- Doldina lauta (Stål, 1860)
- Doldina limera Hussey & Elkins, 1955
- Doldina penalea Hussey & Elkins, 1955
- Doldina praetermissa Bergroth
