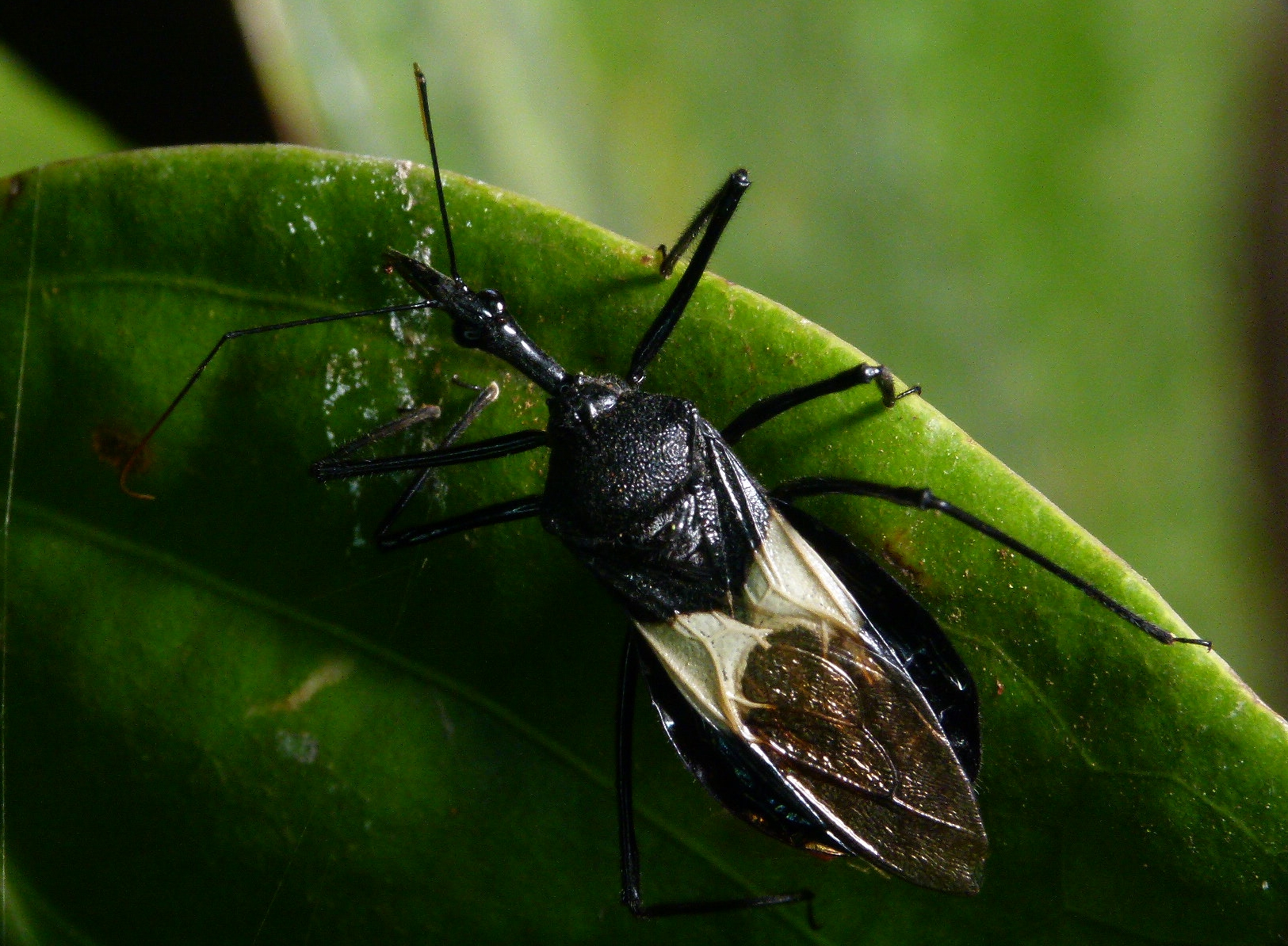
- Unidentified species from India

Scientific classification
- Kingdom: Animalia
- Phylum: Arthropoda
- Class: Insecta
- Order: Hemiptera
- Suborder: Heteroptera
- Family: Reduviidae
- Tribe: Harpactorini
- Genus: Sycanus; Amyot and Serville, 1843

Species
- See Text

= Sycanus =

Genus of true bugs

Sycanus is a genus of assassin bug with many species that are found in the African and Asian region.

== Partial species list ==
Species in the genus include

- Sycanus affinis Reuter, 1881
- Sycanus albofasciatus Bergroth, 1908
- Sycanus ater (Wolff, 1802)
- Sycanus atrocoerulens Signoret, 1862
- Sycanus bifidus (Fabricius, 1787)
- Sycanus collaris (Fabricius, 1785)
- Sycanus croceovittatus Dohrn, 1959
- Sycanus dubius Paiva, 1919
- Sycanus falleni Stal, 1863
- Sycanus galbanus Distant, 1906
- Sycanus indagator Stal, 1863
- Sycanus inermis Distant, 1902
- Sycanus pyrrhomelas Walker, 1873
- Sycanus reclinatus Stal Dorn, 1859
- Sycanus rubicratus Stal, 1874
- Sycanus ventralis Distant, 1919
- Sycanus versicolor Dohrn, 1859
- Sycanus vividus Distant, 1919
