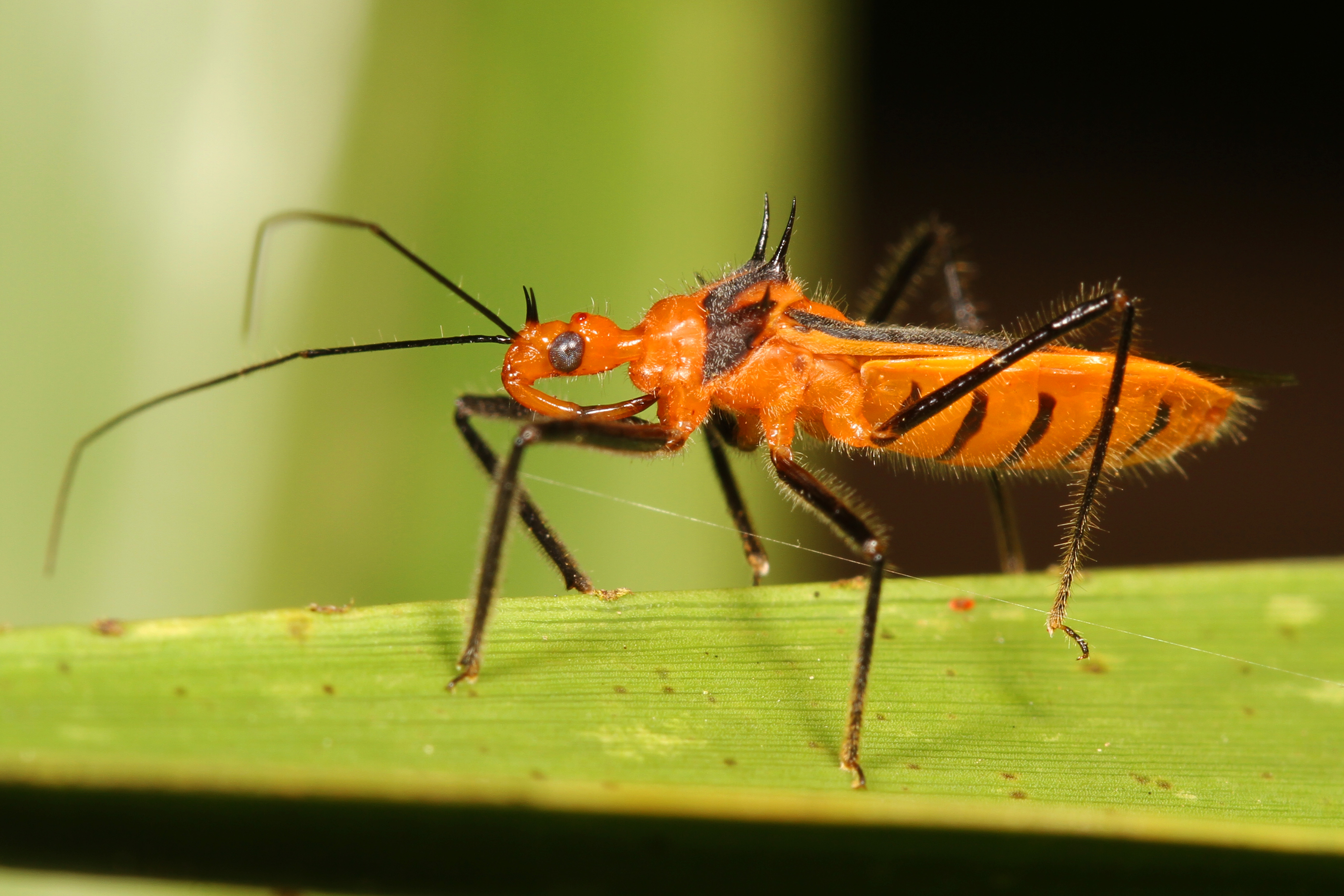

Scientific classification
- Kingdom: Animalia
- Phylum: Arthropoda
- Class: Insecta
- Order: Hemiptera
- Suborder: Heteroptera
- Family: Reduviidae
- Genus: Repipta
- Species: R. taurus

Binomial name
- Repipta taurus (Fabricius, 1803)

Synonyms
- Zelus taurus Fabricius, 1803

= Repipta taurus =

Species of true bug

Repipta taurus, the red bull assassin, is a species of assassin bug in the family Reduviidae. It is found in Central America and North America.

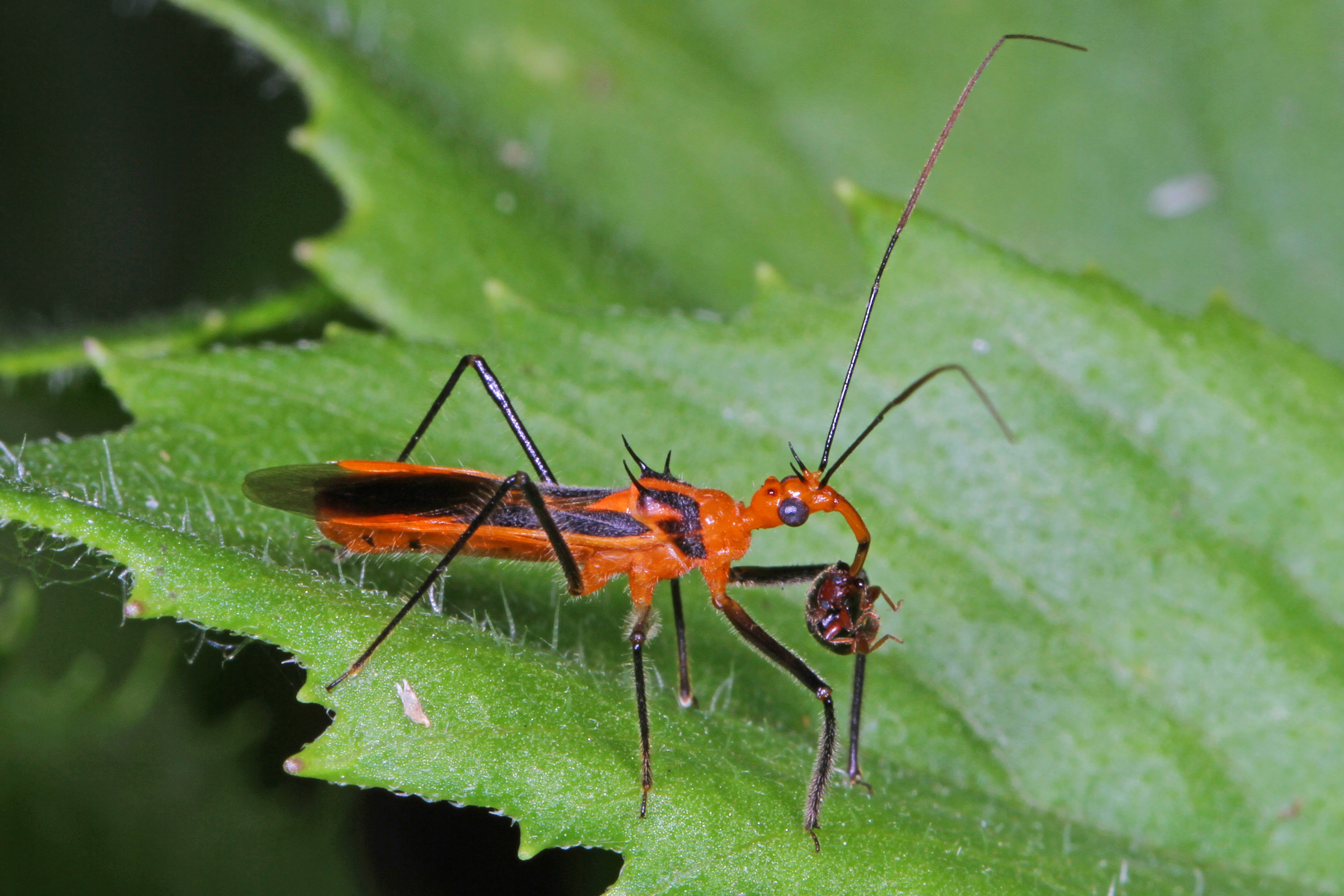
Red bull assassin, Repipta taurus
