= Tunes saucius =

Scientific classification
- Kingdom: Animalia
- Phylum: Arthropoda
- Clade: Pancrustacea
- Class: Insecta
- Order: Hemiptera
- Suborder: Heteroptera
- Family: Reduviidae
- Genus: Tunes; Stål, 1866
- Species: T. saucius

Binomial name
- Tunes saucius Stål, 1866

Genus of true bugs

Tunes is a genus of assassin bug (family Reduviidae), in the subfamily Harpactorinae, containing a single described species, Tunes saucius.
