= Lingnania =

Lingnania braconiformis

Scientific classification
- Domain: Eukaryota
- Kingdom: Animalia
- Phylum: Arthropoda
- Class: Insecta
- Order: Hemiptera
- Suborder: Heteroptera
- Family: Reduviidae
- Genus: Lingnania; China, 1940
- Species: L. braconiformis

Binomial name
- Lingnania braconiformis China, 1940

Genus of true bugs

Lingnania is a genus of assassin bugs (family Reduviidae), in the subfamily Harpactorinae, containing a single described species, Lingnania braconiformis.
