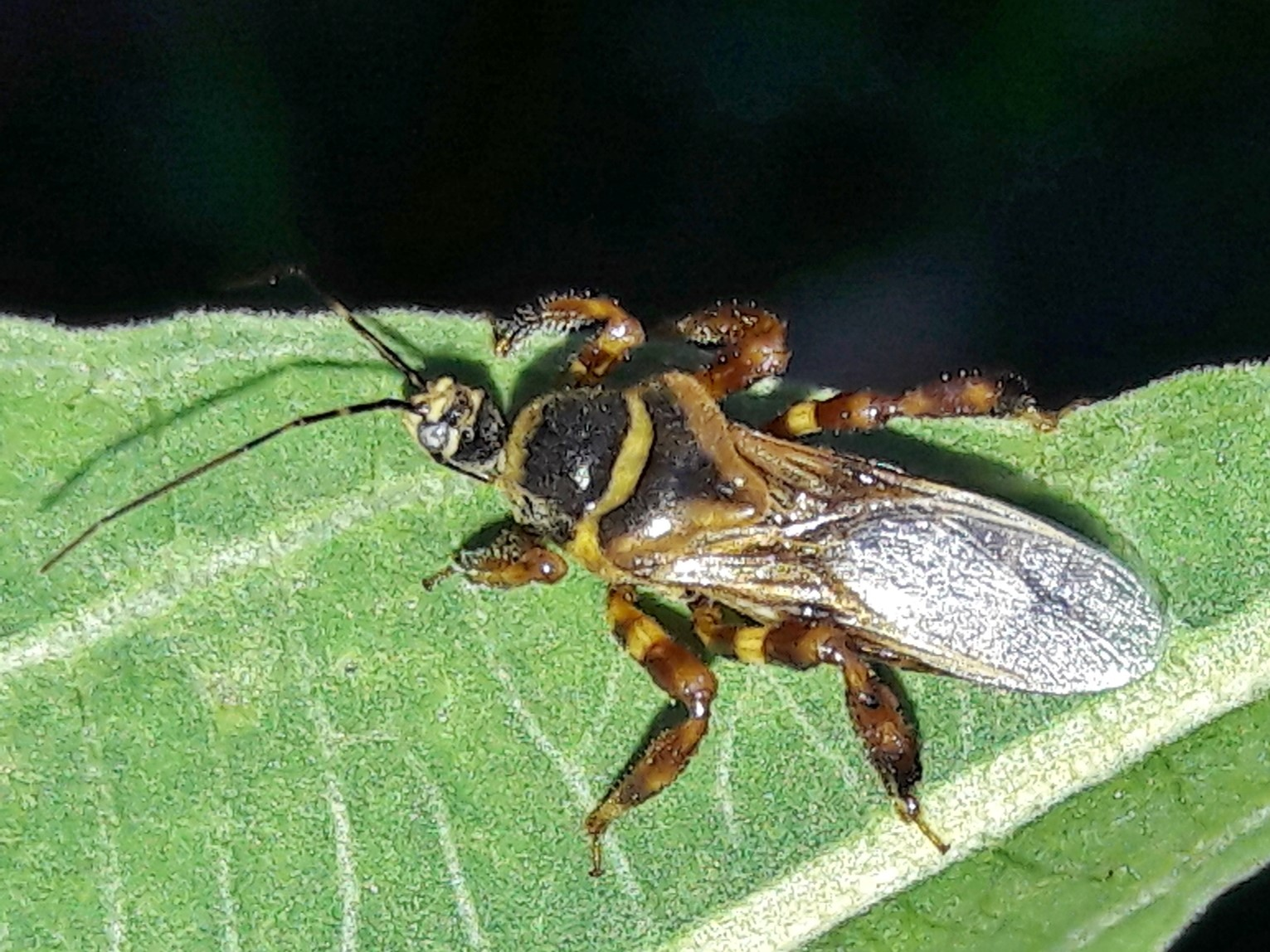
- Notocyrtus foveatus

Scientific classification
- Kingdom: Animalia
- Phylum: Arthropoda
- Class: Insecta
- Order: Hemiptera
- Suborder: Heteroptera
- Family: Reduviidae
- Genus: Notocyrtus; Burmeister, 1835

= Notocyrtus =

Genus of insects

Notocyrtus is a genus of assassin bugs belonging to the family Reduviidae.

The species of this genus are found in Central and Southern America.

== Species ==
The following species are recognised in the genus Notocyrtus:

- Notocyrtus acanganus Carvalho & Costa, 1992
- Notocyrtus amapaensis Carvalho & Costa, 1992
- Notocyrtus bactrianus Champion, 1899
- Notocyrtus camelus Stål, 1843
- Notocyrtus cinctiventris Stål, 1859
- Notocyrtus clavipes (Fabricius, 1803)
- Notocyrtus colombianus Carvalho & Costa, 1992
- Notocyrtus costai Gil-Santana & Forero, 2009
- Notocyrtus depressus Stål, 1872
- Notocyrtus dispersus Carvalho & Costa, 1992
- Notocyrtus dorsalis (Gray, 1832)
- Notocyrtus excavatus (Stål, 1854)
- Notocyrtus fornicatus (Fabricius, 1794)
- Notocyrtus foveatus Stål, 1872
- Notocyrtus fungosus Stål, 1859
- Notocyrtus gibbus (Fabricius, 1803)
- Notocyrtus guimaramus Carvalho & Costa, 1992
- Notocyrtus inflatus (Perty, 1834)
- Notocyrtus paraensis Carvalho & Costa, 1992
- Notocyrtus ricciae Gil-Santana & Costa, 2001
- Notocyrtus spec (Gray, 1832) Gray, 1832
- Notocyrtus spec Carvalho
- Notocyrtus spec Gil-Santana
- Notocyrtus spec Stal, 1872
- Notocyrtus tibanae Costa & Gil-Santana, 2001
- Notocyrtus triareatus Stål, 1859
- Notocyrtus tripus Stål, 1859
- Notocyrtus vesiculosus (Perty, 1834)
- Notocyrtus wallengreni Stål, 1872
- BOLD:ACI1488 (Notocyrtus sp.)
- BOLD:AEB7232 (Notocyrtus sp.)
