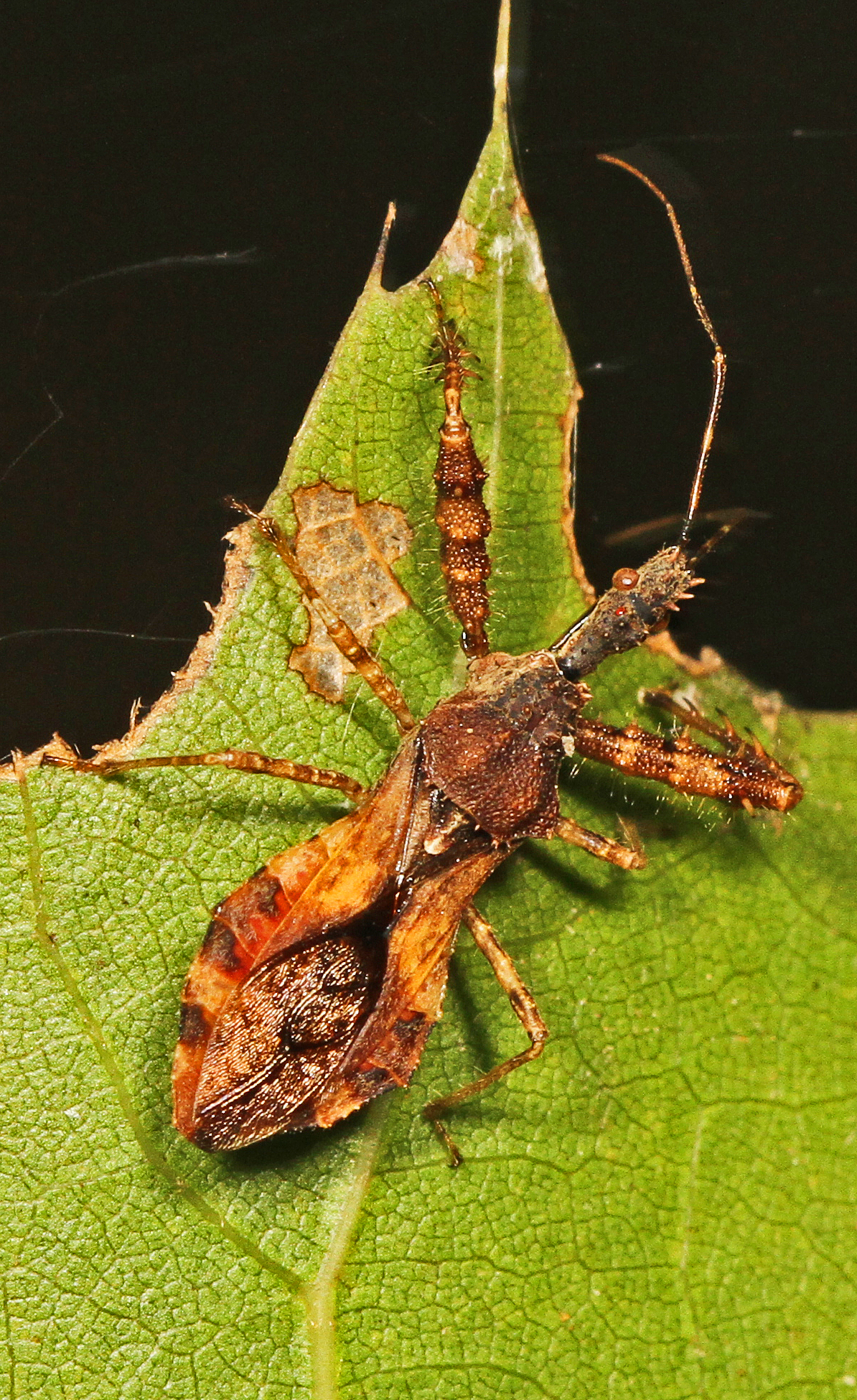

Scientific classification
- Domain: Eukaryota
- Kingdom: Animalia
- Phylum: Arthropoda
- Class: Insecta
- Order: Hemiptera
- Suborder: Heteroptera
- Family: Reduviidae
- Genus: Sinea
- Species: S. diadema

Binomial name
- Sinea diadema Fabricius, 1776

= Sinea diadema =

Species of insect

Sinea diadema is a species of assassin bug family (Reduviidae), in the subfamily Harpactorinae. Sinea diadema is bivoltine, preys on small bugs and beetles, and overwinters in the egg stage.

== Name ==
In English the species goes by the common name spined assassin bug. Its scientific name comes from Hebrew, where sinea means thorn bush or burning bush while diadema means crown.

== Diet ==
They wait for prey to come by, usually on blossoms which are often visited. They also will slowly approach prey before attempting capture.

Adult spined assassin bug on goldenrod

Cannibalism is not common in this species. However, when it occurs it usually involves a larger female eating a smaller male.

== Reproduction ==
Females can lay up to 412 eggs in laboratory conditions. Eggs are laid in clusters.

== Occurrence ==
It is native to North America and found in the Midwest in fields, often associated with goldenrod Solidago missouriensis Nuttall. They are typically found in grasslands, gardens, as well as fields.
