= Camptibia =

Scientific classification
- Kingdom: Animalia
- Phylum: Arthropoda
- Class: Insecta
- Order: Hemiptera
- Suborder: Heteroptera
- Family: Reduviidae
- Subfamily: Harpactorinae
- Genus: Camptibia; Cai & Tomokuni, 2003
- Species: C. obscura

Binomial name
- Camptibia obscura Cai & Tomokuni, 2003

Genus of true bugs

Camptibia is a genus of assassin bugs (insects in the family Reduviidae) in the subfamily Harpactorinae. It is reported from China. The lone species is Camptibia obscura.
