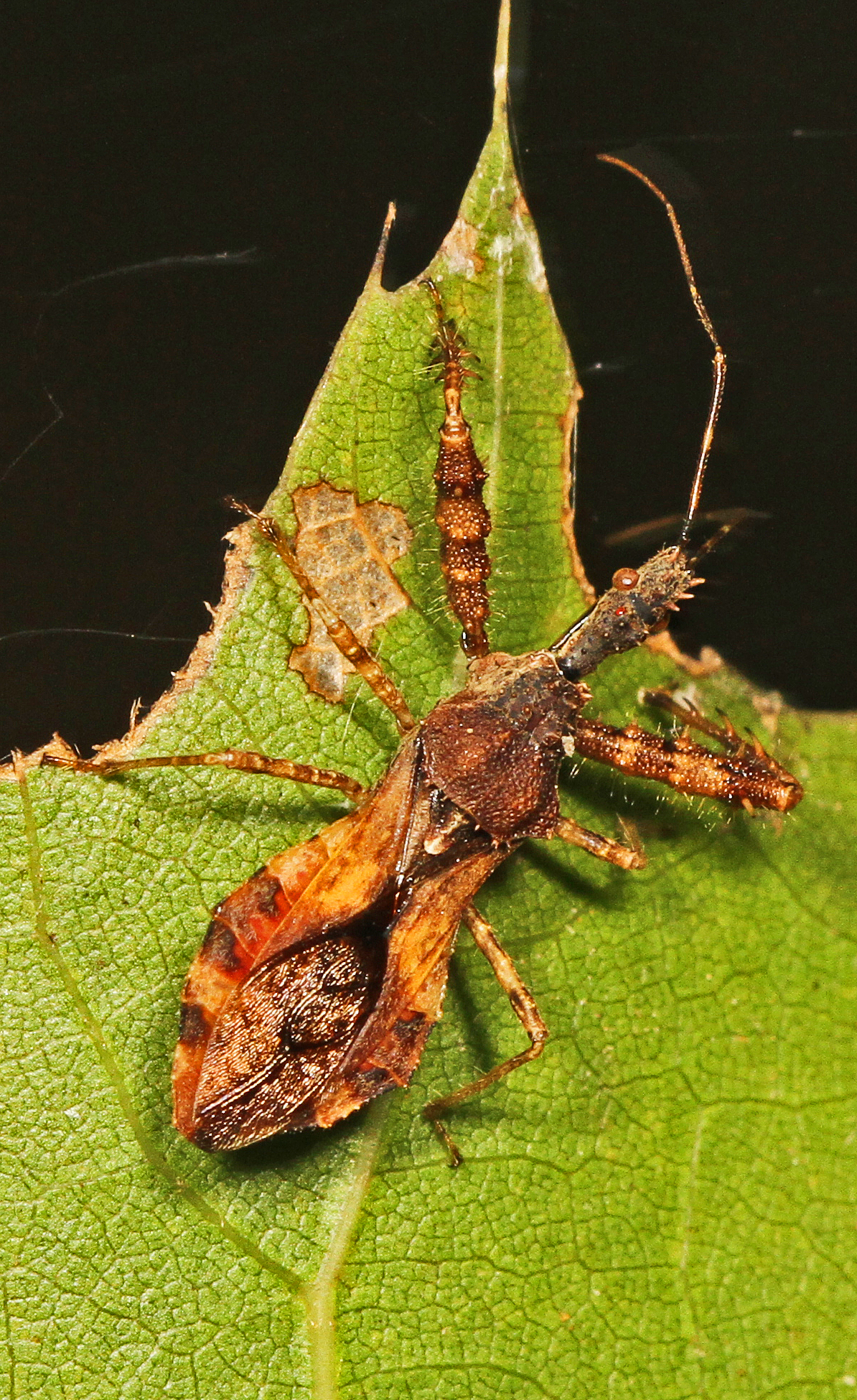
- Sinea diadema

Scientific classification
- Kingdom: Animalia
- Phylum: Arthropoda
- Clade: Pancrustacea
- Class: Insecta
- Order: Hemiptera
- Suborder: Heteroptera
- Family: Reduviidae
- Subfamily: Harpactorinae
- Tribe: Harpactorini; Amyot & Audinet-Serville, 1843

= Harpactorini =

Tribe of true bugs

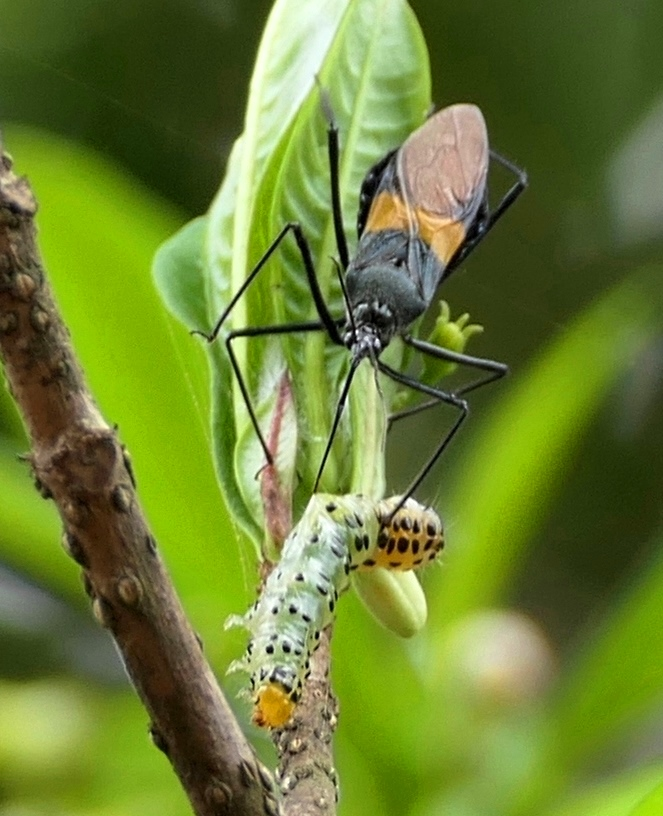
Sycanus species with caterpillar prey in India

Harpactorini is a tribe of the Harpactorinae (assassin bugs). This group is the most diverse of the entire assassin bug family, with 51 genera recognized in the Neotropical Region and 289 genera and 2003 species overall.

This tribe contains the only genera of the reduviidae with exaggerated modifications of the pronotum, such as the wheel bug (Arilus) and the strongly raised and divided posterior pronotal lobe in Ulpius Stål, 1865.

== Genera ==
- Abelamocoris Miller, 1958
- Acanthischium Amyot & Serville, 1843
- Acholla Stål, 1862
- Aga – monotypic
- Arilus Hahn, 1831
- Astinus Stål, 1859
- Atopozelus Elkins, 1954
- Atrachelus Amyot and Serville, 1843
- Coilopus Elkins, 1969
- Cosmoclopius Stål, 1866
- Castolus Stål, 1858
- Camptibia Cai, 2003
- Coranus Curtis, 1833
- Cydnocoris Stål, 1866
- Dalytra Stål, 1861
- Doldina Stål, 1859
- Epidaus Stål, 1859
- Euagoras Burmeister, 1835
- Eulyes Amyot & Serville, 1843
- Fitchia Stål, 1859
- Harpactor Laporte, 1833
- Harpactorella – monotypic Harpactorella frederici Wygodzinsky, 1946
- Heza Amyot and Serville, 1843
- Irantha Stål, 1861
- Liangcoris Zhao, Cai & Ren, 2007
- Lopodytes Stål, 1853
- Nagusta Stål, 1859
- Notocyrtus Burmeister, 1835
- Orbella Fabricius, 1787
- Pahabengkakia Miller, 1941
- Panthous Stål, 1863
- Ploeogaster Amyot & Serville, 1843
- Polymazus Gerstaecker, 1892
- Pristhesancus Amyot & Serville, 1843
- Protenthocoris Miller, 1959
- Pselliopus Bergroth, 1905
- Repipta Stål, 1859
- Rhynocoris Hahn, 1834
- Rhinocoroides Miller, 1953
- Ricolla Stål, 1859
- Rihirbus Stål, 1861
- Rocconota Stål, 1859
- Sinea Amyot and Serville, 1843
- Sphedanolestes Stål
- Sycanus Amyot and Serville, 1843
- Tunes Stål, 1866
- Ulpius Stål, 1865
- Undiareduvius Malipatil, 1991
- Vachiria Stål, 1859
- Vadimon Stål, 1859
- Varelia Kirkaldy, 1910
- Vatinius Stål, 1865
- Veledella Bergroth, 1894
- Velinus Stål, 1865
- Vesbius Stål, 1865
- Vestula Stål, 1865
- Vesulus Stål, 1865
- Vibertiola Horváth, 1909
- Villanovanus Distant, 1904
- Villiersiana Putshkov, 1985
- Vitumnus Stål, 1865
- Xystonyttus Kirkaldy, 1909
- Yolinus Amyot & Serville, 1843
- Zamolxis Stål, 1865
- Zavattariocoris Miller, 1954
- Zelus Fabricius, 1802
- Zostus Stål, 1874

=== Other genera ===
Agrioclopius - Agriolestes - Agriosphodrus - Agyrius - Alcmenoides - Ambastus - Amphibolus - Analanca - Anyttus - Aphonocoris - Aprepolestes - Arcesius - Aristathlus - Aulacoclopius - Aulacosphodrus - Australcnema - Austrarcesius - Austrovelinus - Authenta - Baliemocoris - Bequaertidea - Bergrothellus - Bettotanocoris - Bewanicoris - Biasticus - Blapton - Bocatella - Brassivola - Breddinia - Bubiacoris - Bukacoris - Butuanocoris - Callanocoris - Callilestes - Callistodema - Campsolomus - Camptibia - Campylorhyncha - Carmenula - Catasphactes - Cerellius - Chaetacantha - Chondrolophus - Cidoria - Coliniella - Colpochilocoris - Coniophyrta - Coranopsis - Corcia - Corhinoris - Cosmolestes - Cosmosycanus - Debilia - Diarthrotarsus - Dinocleptes - Domnus - Dumbia - Ecelenodalus - Elemacoris - Elongicoris - Endochiella - Endochopsis - Endochus - Epidaucus - Erbessus - Euagoropsis - Eurocconota - Eurosomocoris - Floresocoris - Gattonocoris - Gminatellus - Gminatus - Gonteosphodrus - Gorareduvius - Graptocleptes - Graptoclopius - Graptolestes - Haematochares - Hagia - Hagiana - Haplolestes - Harpagocoris - Harrisocoris - Havinthus - Hediocoris - Helonotus - Heterocorideus - Hiranetis - Hoffmannocoris - Homalosphodrus - Hoplomargasus - Hoplopium - IgoraIocoris - Iquitozelus - Iranthoides - Ischnoclopius - Ischnolestes - Isocondylus - Isyndus - Ixopus - Jeanneliella - Kalabitocoris - Kalonotocoris - Kaniama - Keiserocoris - Kibatia - Kibonotocoris - Komodocoris - Lamottellus - Lamprosphodrus - Lanca - Leptolestes - Lerton - Lestonicoris - Lindus - Lingnania - Lissocleptes - Loboplusius - Lophocephala - Luja - Macracanthopsis - Mafulucoris - Makilingana - Maldonadocoris - Mametocoris - Margasus - Marjoriana - Massartia - Mastigonomus - Mastocoris - Mastostethocoris - Mecistocoris - Microcarenus - Mireella - Mireicoris - Mokoto - Montina - Moto - Motoperius - Mucrolicter - Myocoris - Nacorus - Nacurosana - Nagustoides - Nannotegea - Nanyukicoris - Narsetes - Neoarcesius - Neobiasticus - Neocydnocoris - Neohavinthus - Neonagusta - Neosphedanolestes - Neotropiconyttus - Neoveledella - Neovelinus - Neovillanovanus - Nesocastolus - Nicrus - Nothocleptes - Occamus - Odontogonus - Oedemanota - Palawanocoris - Paloptus - Paniaia - Pantoleistes - Paracydnocoris - Parahiranetis - Paralcnema - Paramphibolus - Parapeprius - Parasclomina - Paravadimon - Parendochus - Pareulyes - Parharpagocoris - Parhelonotus - Parirantha - Peprius - Perissorhynchus - Peyrierocoris - Pharagocoris - Phemius - Phonoctonus - Phonolibes - Piestolestes - Pirnonota - Pisilus - Platerus - Poecilobdallus - Poeciloclopius - Poecilosphodrus - Polididus - Pseudolopodes - Pseudolopodytes - Pseudophonoctonus - Pyrrhosphodrus - Rhapactor - Rhaphidosoma - Rhinocoroides - Sava - Saxitius - Scipinia - Sclomina - Scoloponotus - Serendiba - Serendibana - Serendus - Siamocoris - Sindala - Sosius - Sphodronyttus - Stachyomerus - Stalireduvius - Stehlikia - Tegea - Tegellula - Testusius - Thereutocoris - Thysanuchus - Tivanius - Toxocamptellus - Trachylestes
