= List of Figulus species =

These 136 species belong to Figulus, a genus of stag beetles in the family Lucanidae.

== Species ==
These 136 species belong to the genus Figulus:

- Figulus acutangulus Arrow, 1935 (Vietnam)
- Figulus albertisii Gestro, 1881 (Indonesia)
- Figulus andamanus Kriesche, 1920 (India [Andaman])
- Figulus angustus Bomans, 1989 (India [West Bengal])
- Figulus anthracinus Klug, 1834 (Sub-Saharan Africa)
- Figulus approximatus Benesh, 1955 (Mauritius)
- Figulus aratus Arrow, 1935 (Sri Lanka, India [Tamil Nadu])
- Figulus beccarii Gestro, 1881 (Indonesia [Sumatra])
- Figulus bicolor Bomans, 1986 (China [Yunnan], Vietnam)
- Figulus binodulus Waterhouse, 1872 (temperate Asia)
- Figulus boileaui Bomans, 1986 (Australia [Queensland])
- Figulus bomansi Ikeda, 2002 (Malaysia [Sabah])
- Figulus boninensis Nakane & Kurosawa, 1953
- Figulus borneensis Nagel, 1941 (Malaysia [Sabah])
- Figulus caecus Bomans, 1988 (Indonesia)
- Figulus cambodiensis Deyrolle, 1874 (Cambodia)
- Figulus canaliculatus Nagel, 1941 (Indonesia)
- Figulus caoi Huang & Chen, 2017 (China [Yunnan])
- Figulus capensis (Casstrom & Thunberg, 1781) (South Africa)
- Figulus caviceps Boileau, 1902 (Bhutan, China, India, Myanmar, Nepal, Thailand, Vietnam)
- Figulus cavifrons Bomans, 1987 (Indonesia [Sumatra])
- Figulus chaminadei Benoit & Bomans, 2001 (Indonesia [Sumba])
- Figulus cheesmani Arrow, 1938 (Indonesia)
- Figulus cicatricosus Boileau, 1905 (India [Tamil Nadu])
- Figulus cochinchinensis Nagel, 1928 (Vietnam)
- Figulus concatenatus Arrow, 1938 (Malaysia [Sarawak])
- Figulus confusus Westwood, 1838 (Cambodia, Caroline Islands, Indonesia, Malaysia)
- Figulus coomani Arrow, 1935 (Vietnam)
- Figulus corvinus Kriesche, 1922 (Cameroon)
- Figulus crupsinus Bomans, 1987 (Philippines [Luzon])
- Figulus curvicornis Benesh, 1950 (Philippines, temperate Asia)
- Figulus decipiens Albers, 1884 (Sao Tomé)
- Figulus decorus de Lisle, 1968 (Bismarck Islands)
- Figulus deletus Bomans, 1989 (China (Guangxi), Vietnam)
- Figulus delicatus Bomans, 1987 (Singapore)
- Figulus delislei Benesh, 1953 (Vietnam)
- Figulus detzneri Kriesche, 1922 (Indonesia)
- Figulus elateroides Bomans, 1986 (Laos)
- Figulus excavatus Bomans, 1987 (Indonesia)
- Figulus exquisitus Bomans, 1987 (Singapore)
- Figulus fissicollis Fairmaire, 1849 (Tahiti, Fiji, Papua New Guinea, temperate Asia)
- Figulus foveicollis (Boisduval, 1835) (New Caledonia, Papua New Guinea, Tahiti)
- Figulus fulgens Bomans, 1987 (Pacific Islands)
- Figulus fusconitens Didier, 1931 (Nias Island)
- Figulus gestroi Nagel, 1928 (Indonesia)
- Figulus gracilentus Didier, 1931 (Indonesia [Ambon])
- Figulus granulosus Bomans, 1986 (Indonesia [Sumatra])
- Figulus hoogstraali Benesh, 1958 (Philippines [Mindanao])
- Figulus hoplocnemus de Lisle, 1974 (Indonesia)
- Figulus hornabrooki Bomans, 1987 (Indonesia, Papua New Guinea)
- Figulus horni Zang, 1905 (Sri Lanka)
- Figulus hsui Huang & Chen, 2016 (Taiwan and temperate Asia)
- Figulus humeralis Didier, 1931 (Indonesia [Tenimber Island])
- Figulus impressicollis Ritsema, 1896 (Malaysia [Sabah])
- Figulus incertus Bomans, 1987 (Indonesia)
- Figulus incisus Bomans, 1987 (Singapore)
- Figulus insolitus Bomans, 1987 (Bhutan)
- Figulus insulanus Bomans, 1987 (Pacific Island)
- Figulus integricollis Thomson, 1862 (Marianas Islands)
- Figulus interruptus Waterhouse, 1874 (Sri Lanka)
- Figulus javanensis Nagel, 1941 (Indonesia [Java])
- Figulus joliveti Bomans, 1987 (Indonesia)
- Figulus kinabaluensis Bomans, 1987 (Malaysia [Sabah])
- Figulus laevipennis Montrouzier, 1860 (New Caledonia)
- Figulus lansbergei Ritsema, 1880 (Indonesia (Sumbawa)
- Figulus laoticus Bomans, 1986 (Laos)
- Figulus laticollis Reiche, 1853 (Philippines)
- Figulus leptochilus de Lisle, 1974 (Solomon Islands)
- Figulus lilliputanus Westwood, 1855 (Australia)
- Figulus linearis (Didier, 1928) (India [Malabar Islands, Kerala])
- Figulus lozoki Kriesche, 1922 (Papua New Guinea, Indonesia)
- Figulus luminosus Bomans, 2010 (Caroline Islands)
- Figulus lupinus Kriesche, 1922 (Palau Islands)
- Figulus magnus Benesh, 1955 (Seychelles)
- Figulus manicatus Didier & Séguy, 1953 (Vietnam)
- Figulus manillarum Hope, 1845 (Philippines)
- Figulus marginalis Ritsema, 1879 (Borneo, Indonesia [Java, Sumatra])
- Figulus mecynodontus de Lisle, 1974 (Solomon Islands [San Cristobal Island])
- Figulus mediocris Deyrolle, 1874 (Indonesia [Sumatra], Malaysia [Malacca])
- Figulus meridianus Bomans, 1986 (India [Kerala])
- Figulus minor Kriesche, 1920 (Cameroon, Ivory Coast)
- Figulus minutus Deyrolle, 1874 (Indonesia [Banda Island])
- Figulus moluccanus de Lisle, 1970 (Indonesia [Moluccas])
- Figulus morosus de Lisle, 1974 (Solomon Islands)
- Figulus myrmecodianus Cammaerts & Bomans, 1997 (Indonesia)
- Figulus napu Kriesche, 1922 (China (Yunnan), Vietnam)
- Figulus nitens Waterhouse, 1874 (Australia)
- Figulus nitidulus Gestro, 1881 (Papua New Guinea, Indonesia)
- Figulus nubilus Didier, 1931 (Indonesia [Tenimber Island])
- Figulus orientalis Bomans, 1989 (Indonesia [Moluccas, Dammer Island])
- Figulus orthognathus Benesh, 1950 (Philippines [Mindanao])
- Figulus papuanus Gestro, 1881 (Papua New Guinea, Indonesia)
- Figulus parallelicanthus Bomans, 1989 (China (Yunnan), Vietnam)
- Figulus parvus Bomans, 1987 (Cameroon, Gabon, DR Congo)
- Figulus philippinensis Benesh, 1955 (Philippines [Luzon])
- Figulus piceus Bomans, 1989 (Cambodia, Thailand, Vietnam)
- Figulus planifrons Bomans, 1987 (Indonesia [Sumatra])
- Figulus popei Bomans, 1987 (Solomon Islands)
- Figulus porrectus Bomans, 1989 (Indonesia [Sumatra])
- Figulus powelli Bomans, 1986 (Malaysia)
- Figulus praecipuus Bomans, 1987 (Indonesia)
- Figulus procericornis Bomans, 1987 (Philippines)
- Figulus procerus Heller, 1898 (Indonesia [Sulawesi])
- Figulus pseudominor Monte & Bartolozzi, 2005 (Sub-Saharan Africa)
- Figulus punctatus Waterhouse, 1872 (temperate Asia)
- Figulus punctifrons Bomans, 1987 (Borneo)
- Figulus quasisimilis Bomans, 1989 (Malaysia [Sarawak])
- Figulus regularis Westwood, 1834 (Australia, Papua New Guinea, Indonesia)
- Figulus robustus Bomans, 1987 (Solomon Islands)
- Figulus rossi Gahan, 1900 (Christmas Island)
- Figulus rubripes Bomans, 1986 (Indonesia)
- Figulus rugosus Deyrolle, 1874 (Borneo)
- Figulus samoanus Kriesche, 1920 (Samoa)
- Figulus sarawakensis Bomans, 1987 (Malaysia [Sarawak])
- Figulus scaritiformis Parry, 1862 (Malaysia, Indonesia)
- Figulus schismonotus (de Lisle, 1975) (Indonesia)
- Figulus scotti Benesh, 1955 (Mauritius)
- Figulus serratus Arrow, 1938 (Malaysia [Sarawak])
- Figulus seychellensis Scott, 1912 (Seychelles)
- Figulus similis Bomans, 1987 (Indonesia)
- Figulus spinosus Bomans, 1987 (Solomon Islands)
- Figulus splendens Bomans, 1987 (Indonesia)
- Figulus striatus (Olivier, 1789) (Seychelles, Madagascar, Réunion, Mauritius, Rodrigues)
- Figulus subcastaneus Westwood, 1838 (Indonesia [Java])
- Figulus sublaevis (Palisot de Beauvois, 1805) (Sub-Saharan Africa)
- Figulus sulcicollis Hope, 1845 (Australia, Papua New Guinea, Indonesia)
- Figulus suzumurai Fujita, 2010 (Malaysia)
- Figulus tapinus Bomans, 1987 (India [Uttarakhand])
- Figulus trilobus Westwood, 1838 (Australia)
- Figulus tubericollis Bomans, 1989 (Vietnam)
- Figulus tumidimentum Bomans, 1989 (India [Tamil Nadu])
- Figulus venustus Bomans, 1989 (Korea)
- Figulus vinsoni Benesh, 1955 (Mauritius)
- Figulus weinreichei Bomans, 1986 (Indonesia)
- Figulus wittmeri Bomans & Lacroix, 1989 (Nepal)
- Figulus yipai Huang & Chen, 2017 (China [Hainan, Fujian])
