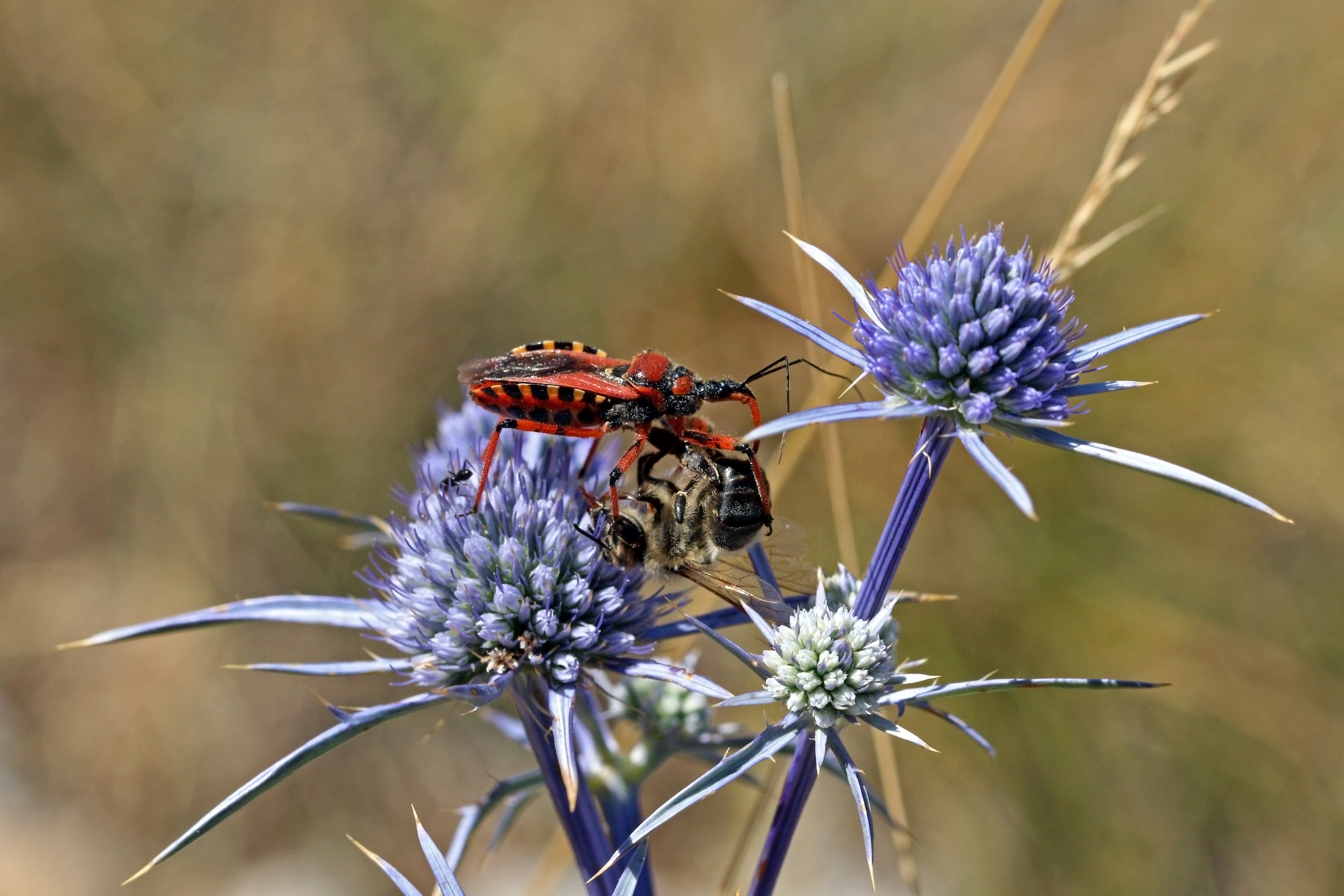
- Assassin bug (Rhynocoris iracundus) with bee prey

Scientific classification
- Domain: Eukaryota
- Kingdom: Animalia
- Phylum: Arthropoda
- Class: Insecta
- Order: Hemiptera
- Suborder: Heteroptera
- Family: Reduviidae
- Subfamily: Harpactorinae
- Tribe: Harpactorini
- Genus: Rhynocoris; Hahn, 1834

Species
- See Text

Synonyms
- Scotarpax Amyot, 1846; Rhinocoris Kolenati, 1857 (Lapsus calami); Charontus Stål, 1874; Chirillus Stål, 1874; Diphymus Stål, 1874; Harpiscus Stål, 1874; Hypertolmus Stål, 1874; Lamphrius Stål, 1874; Oncauchenius Stål, 1874; Coranideus Reuter, 1881

= Rhynocoris =

Genus of true bugs

Rhynocoris annulatus looking for prey

Rhynocoris (historically often misspelled as "Rhinocoris") is a genus of assassin bug, family (Reduviidae), in the subfamily Harpactorinae. Species are recorded from Asia, mainland Europe, Africa and North America.

== Life history ==
Species of this genus are noted for providing parental care of offspring. Parental care is unusual in subsocial insects, having only evolved six times in the Heteroptera. R. tristis for example, is well known for guarding egg masses.

Rhynocoris kumarii is known to prey upon the larvae of Euproctis fraterna (Moore).

== Species ==
BioLib lists the following:

- Rhynocoris abeillei (Puton, 1881)
- Rhynocoris abramovi (Oshanin, 1870)
- Rhynocoris albopilosus (Signoret, 1858)
- Rhynocoris albopunctatus (Stål, 1855)
- Rhynocoris amazulu Kirkaldy, 1859
- Rhynocoris analis (Jakovlev, 1889)
- Rhynocoris annulatus (Linnaeus, 1758)
- Rhynocoris aulicus (Stål, 1866)
- Rhynocoris barakensis Schouteden, 1929
- Rhynocoris bayoni (Jeannel, 1916)
- Rhynocoris beaumonti Villiers, 1966
- Rhynocoris bellicosus (Stål, 1858)
- Rhynocoris bequaerti Schouteden, 1913
- Rhynocoris bequaertianus Schouteden, 1929
- Rhynocoris bicolor (Fabricius, 1781)
- Rhynocoris bipustulatus (Fieber, 1861)
- Rhynocoris bituberculatus (Stål, 1858)
- Rhynocoris brincki Miller, 1956
- Rhynocoris calviventris (Germar, 1837)
- Rhynocoris cardinalis Miller, 1950
- Rhynocoris carmelita (Stål, 1859)
- Rhynocoris carvalhoi Villiers, 1958
- Rhynocoris castanescens (Jeannel, 1916)
- Rhynocoris christophi (Jakovlev, 1877)
- Rhynocoris cinctorius (Stål, 1865)
- Rhynocoris coiffaiti Villiers, 1967
- Rhynocoris congolensis Schouteden, 1932
- Rhynocoris costalis (Stal, 1867)
- Rhynocoris cruralis Bergroth, 1915
- Rhynocoris cuspidatus Ribaut, 1921
- Rhynocoris dasynotum Miller, 1950
- Rhynocoris dauricus Kiritshenko, 1926
- Rhynocoris decoratus Schouteden, 1929
- Rhynocoris discoidalis (Reuter, 1881)
- Rhynocoris donisi Villiers, 1973
- Rhynocoris dudae (Horváth, 1892)
- Rhynocoris dusmeti (Varela, 1905)
- Rhynocoris erythrocnemis (Germar, 1837)
- Rhynocoris erythropus (Linnaeus, 1767)
- Rhynocoris fasciculatus (Bergroth, 1895)
- Rhynocoris fimbriatus Miller, 1948
- Rhynocoris flavolimbatus (Jakovlev, 1889)
- Rhynocoris fuscipes (Fabricius, 1787)
- Rhynocoris ghesquierei Schouteden, 1929
- Rhynocoris gilviventris Bergroth, 1894
- Rhynocoris harmonia Linnavuori, 1989
- Rhynocoris hierapolitanus Dispons, 1964
- Rhynocoris horridus (de Carlini, 1895)
- Rhynocoris hovanus Kirkaldy, 1881
- Rhynocoris hutsebauti Schouteden, 1932
- Rhynocoris ibericus Kolenati, 1857
- Rhynocoris illotus Miller, 1941
- Rhynocoris imperialis (Stål, 1859)
- Rhynocoris incertis (Distant, 1903)
- Rhynocoris iracundus (Poda, 1761)
- Rhynocoris jeanneli Schouteden, 1932
- Rhynocoris kapangae Schouteden, 1952
- Rhynocoris kavirondo Jeannel, 1916
- Rhynocoris kedahensis Miller, 1941
- Rhynocoris kervillei Horváth, 1911
- Rhynocoris kiritshenkoi Popov, 1964
- Rhynocoris kumarii Ambrose & Livingstone, 1986
- Rhynocoris lapidicola Samuel & Joseph, 1953
- Rhynocoris leucospilus (Stål, 1859)
- Rhynocoris lineaticornis (Reuter, 1895)
- Rhynocoris linnavuorii Villiers, 1969
- Rhynocoris longifrons (Stål, 1874)
- Rhynocoris lotellus Miller, 1956
- Rhynocoris lotus Miller, 1956
- Rhynocoris mabirae Miller, 1954
- Rhynocoris machadoi Villiers, 1952
- Rhynocoris maeandrus Distant, 1909
- Rhynocoris marginatus (Fabricius, 1794)
- Rhynocoris marginellus (Fabricius, 1803)
- Rhynocoris maynei Schouteden, 1929
- Rhynocoris mendicus (Stal, 1867)
- Rhynocoris milvus Miller, 1948
- Rhynocoris mirachur Kiritschenko, 1913
- Rhynocoris modestus Schouteden, 1944
- Rhynocoris monachus Miller, 1941
- Rhynocoris monticola (Oshanin, 1870)
- Rhynocoris murati Villiers, 1948
- Rhynocoris neavei Bergroth, 1912
- Rhynocoris nebulosus Miller, 1950
- Rhynocoris nemoralis Miller, 1950
- Rhynocoris niasensis Miller, 1941
- Rhynocoris niger (Herrich-Schäffer, 1842)
- Rhynocoris nigronitens (Reuter, 1881)
- Rhynocoris nilgiriensis Distant, 1903
- Rhynocoris nitidulus (Fabricius, 1781)
- Rhynocoris nysiiphagus Samuel & Joseph, 1953
- Rhynocoris obtusus (Palisot de Beauvois, 1805)
- Rhynocoris ocreatus Dispons, 1964
- Rhynocoris oculata Benedek, 1969
- Rhynocoris odziensis Miller, 1950
- Rhynocoris otjimbumbensis Hesse, 1925
- Rhynocoris overlaeti Schouteden, 1929
- Rhynocoris parthiae China & Miller, 1950
- Rhynocoris persicus (Jakovlev, 1877)
- Rhynocoris pilipectus Hesse, 1925
- Rhynocoris pseudolatro Villiers, 1964
- Rhynocoris pulvisculatus (Distant, 1892)
- Rhynocoris pumilus (Jakovlev, 1877)
- Rhynocoris punctiventris (Herrich-Schaeffer, 1848)
- Rhynocoris pygmaeus (Distant, 1903)
- Rhynocoris rapax (Stål, 1855)
- Rhynocoris rathjensi Miller, 1954
- Rhynocoris reuteri (Distant, 1879)
- Rhynocoris rubricoxa (Bergroth, 1890)
- Rhynocoris rubricus (Germar, 1814)
- Rhynocoris rubrizonatus Miller, 1954
- Rhynocoris rubrogularis (Horváth, 1879)
- Rhynocoris rudebecki Miller, 1956
- Rhynocoris rufigenu (Fallou, 1891)
- Rhynocoris rufipes (Bolivar, 1879)
- Rhynocoris rufus (Thunberg, 1822)
- Rhynocoris saevus (Stål, 1865)
- Rhynocoris schoutedeni Villiers, 1948
- Rhynocoris segmentarius (Germar, 1837)
- Rhynocoris sericans (Reuter, 1881)
- Rhynocoris seyidiensis (Jeannel, 1916)
- Rhynocoris sordidulus (Oshanin, 1870)
- Rhynocoris squalus Distant, 1904
- Rhynocoris squamulosus Villiers, 1948
- Rhynocoris suspectus Schouteden, 1910
- Rhynocoris tavetanus (Jeannel, 1916)
- Rhynocoris transitus Hoberlandt, 1951
- Rhynocoris tristicolor (Reuter, 1881)
- Rhynocoris tristis (Stål, 1855)
- Rhynocoris trochantericus (Reuter, 1877)
- Rhynocoris tropicus (Herrich-Schaeffer, 1848)
- Rhynocoris vandenplasi Schouteden, 1932
- Rhynocoris varians (Paiva, 1918)
- Rhynocoris ventralis (Say, 1832)
- Rhynocoris venustus (Stål, 1855)
- Rhynocoris vicinus (Schouteden, 1910)
- Rhynocoris violentus (Germar, 1837)
- Rhynocoris vittiventris (Stål, 1859)
- Rhynocoris vulneratus (Germar, 1837)
- Rhynocoris vumbaensis Miller, 1950
- Rhynocoris witteanus Schouteden, 1944
- Rhynocoris wittei Schouteden, 1929
- Rhynocoris xosanus (Kirkaldy, 1909)
- Rhynocoris yambuyae (Distant, 1890)
- Rhynocoris zonogaster (de Carlini, 1895)

== Gallery ==
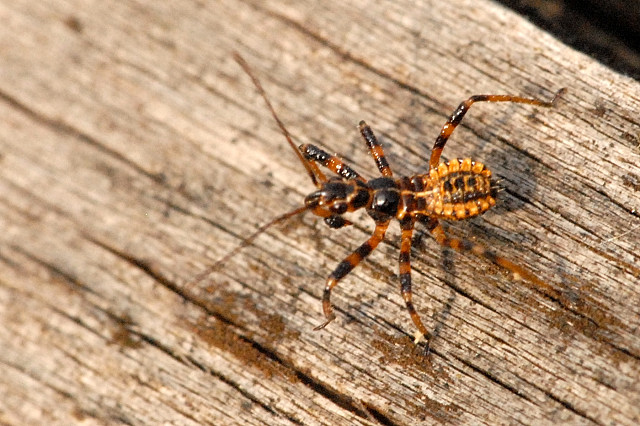
Rhynocoris annulatus

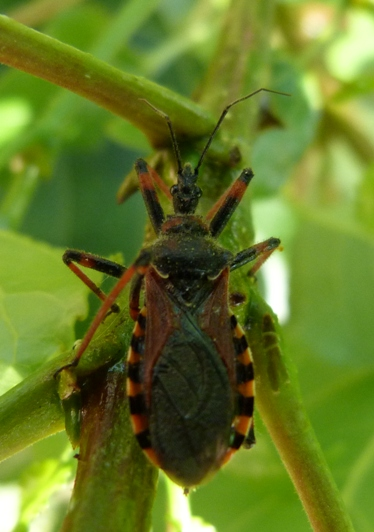
Rhynocoris cuspidatus

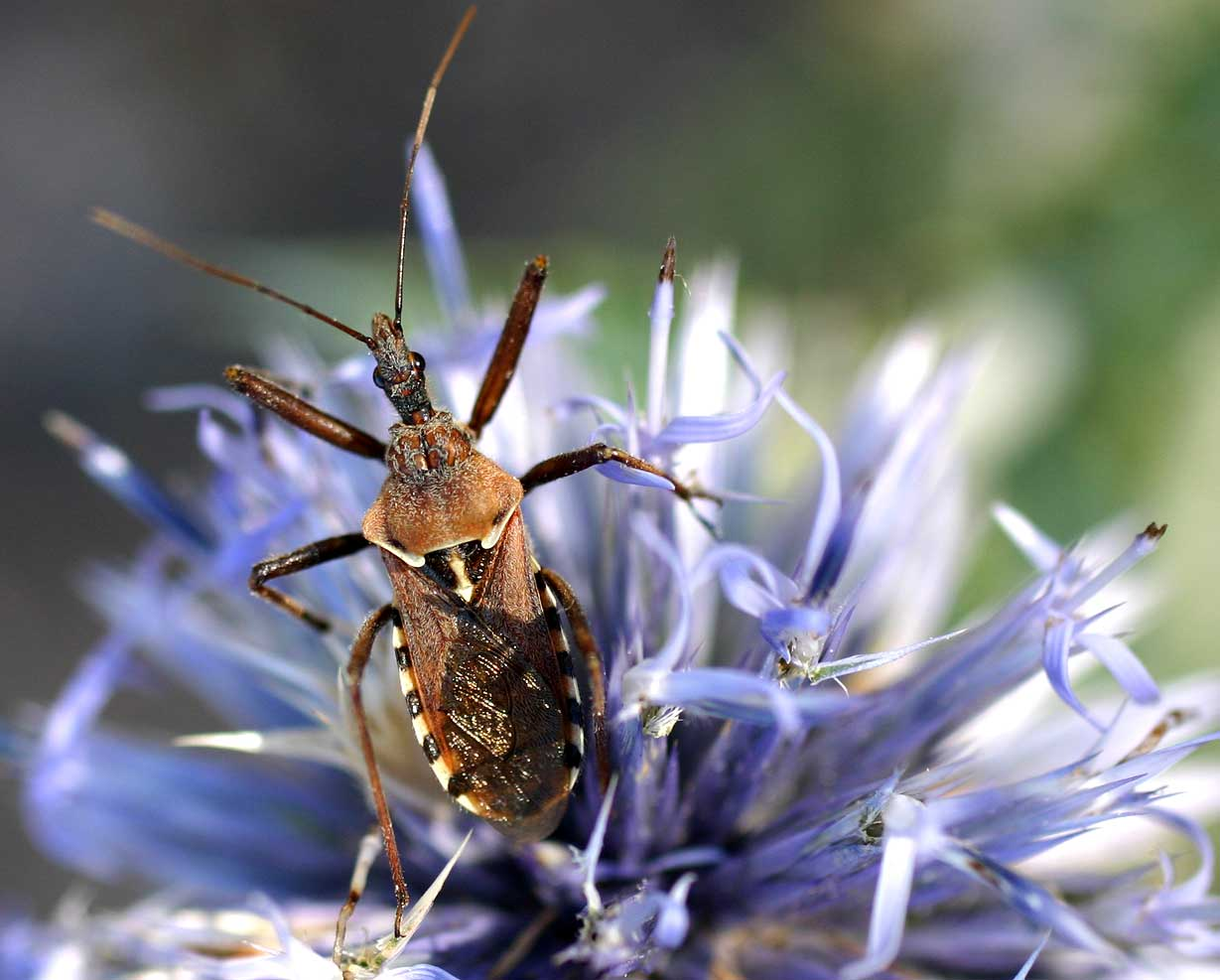
Rhynocoris erythropus

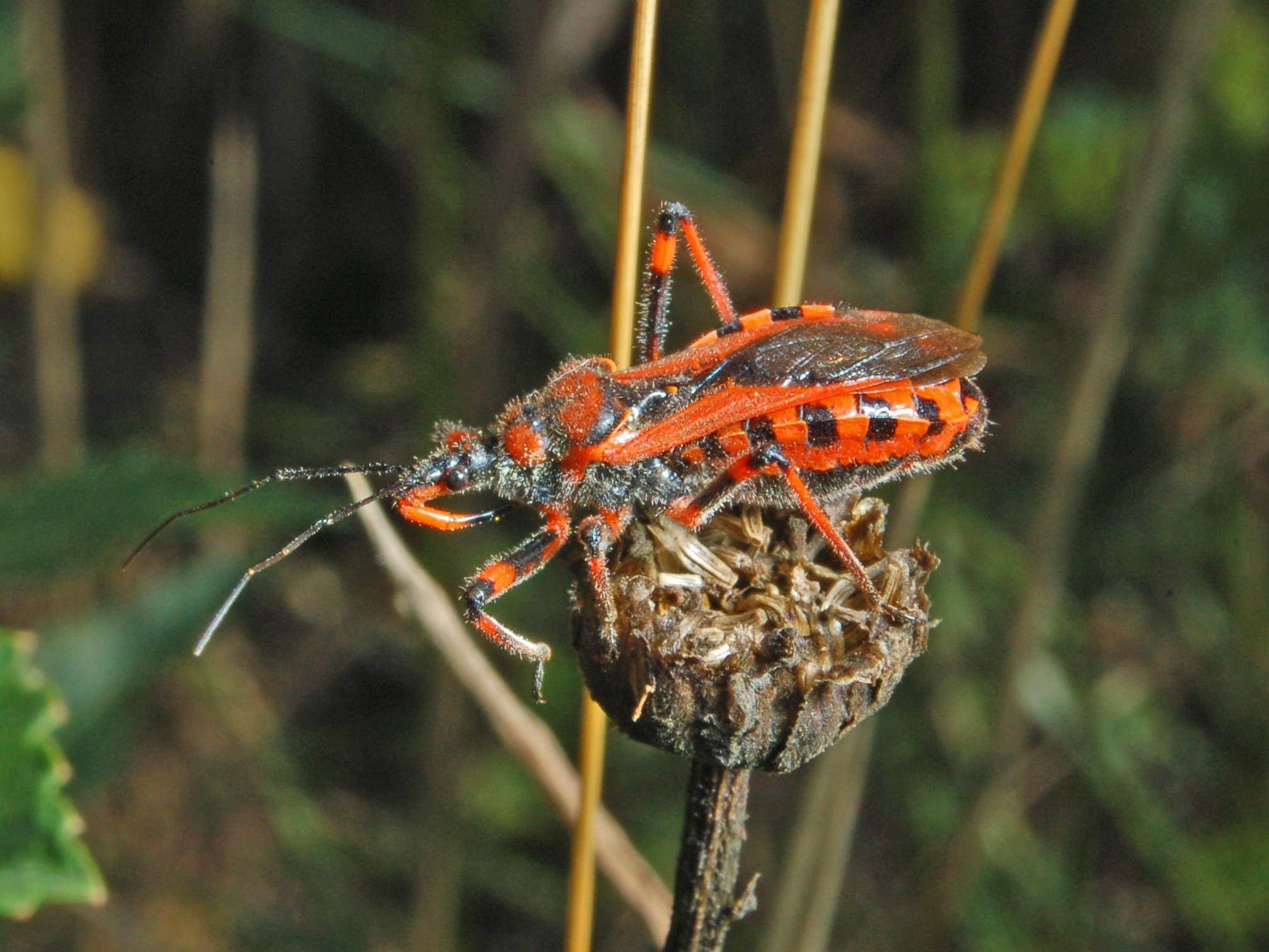
Rhynocoris iracundus

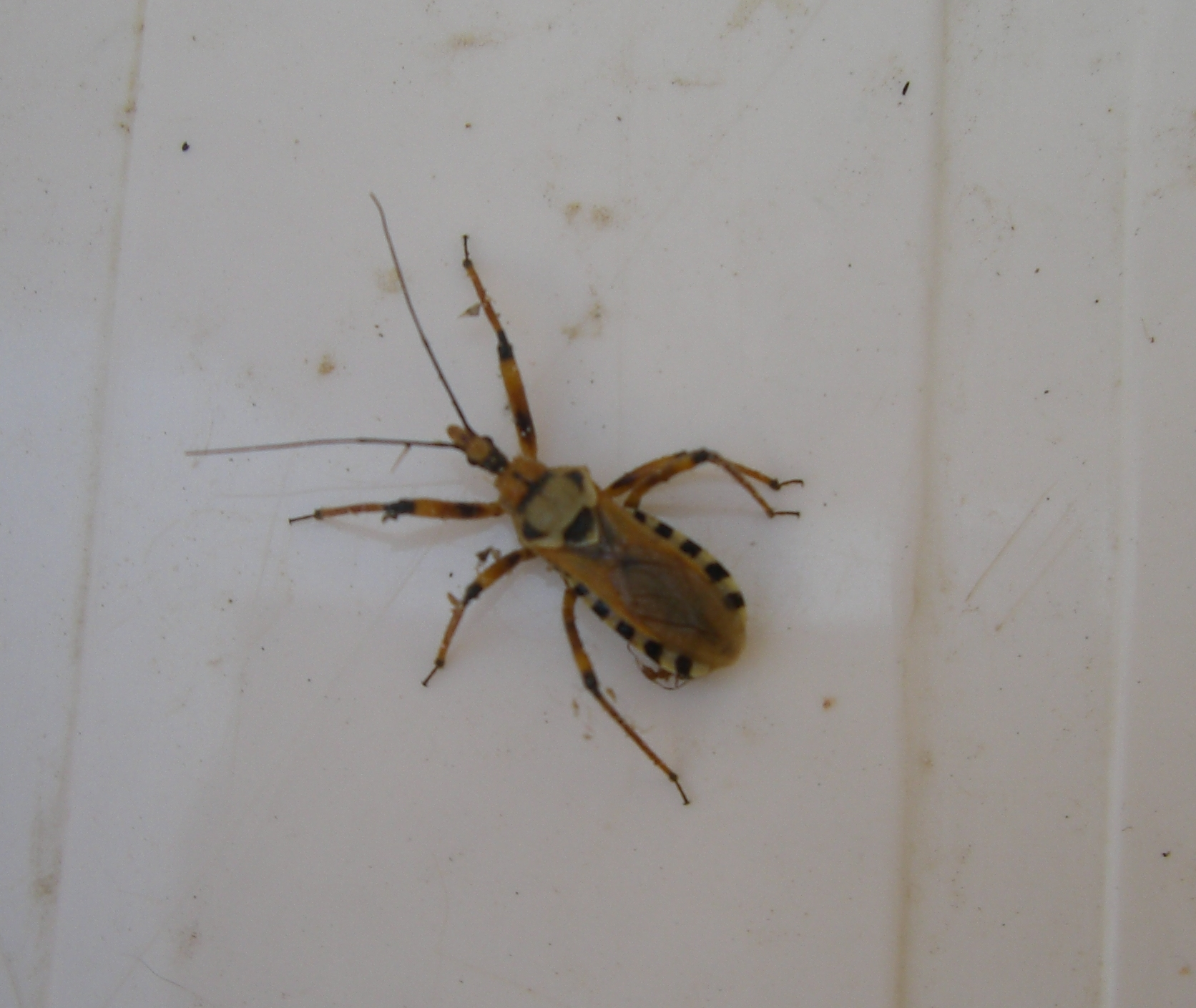
Rhynocoris punctiventris

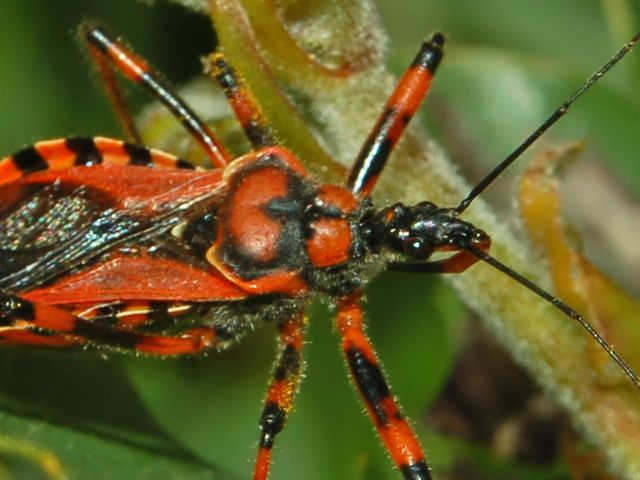
Rhynocoris rubricus
