= Figulus planifrons =

Scientific classification
- Domain: Eukaryota
- Kingdom: Animalia
- Phylum: Arthropoda
- Class: Insecta
- Order: Coleoptera
- Suborder: Polyphaga
- Infraorder: Scarabaeiformia
- Family: Lucanidae
- Subfamily: Lucaninae
- Genus: Figulus
- Species: F. planifrons

Binomial name
- Figulus planifrons Bomans, 1987

Species of beetle

Figulus planifrons is a species in the stag beetle family Lucanidae. It is found on the Indonesian island of Sumatra.
