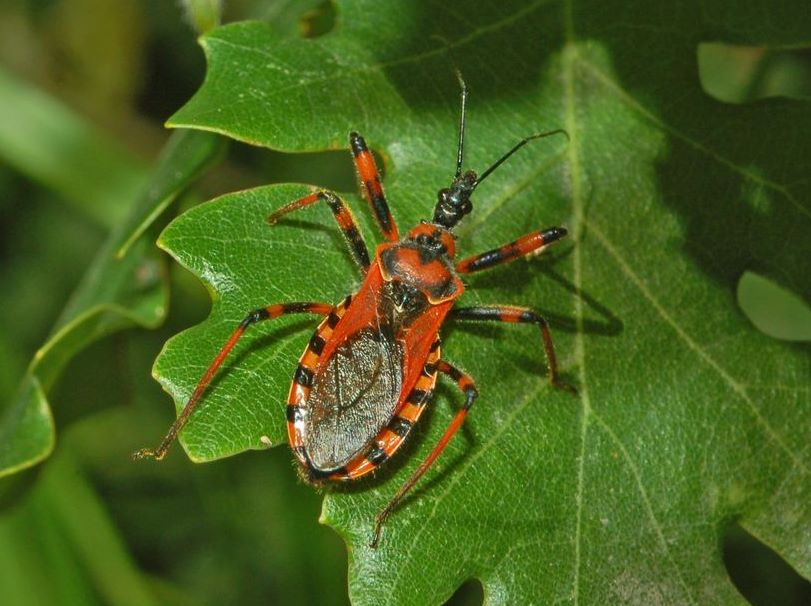
- Dorsal view
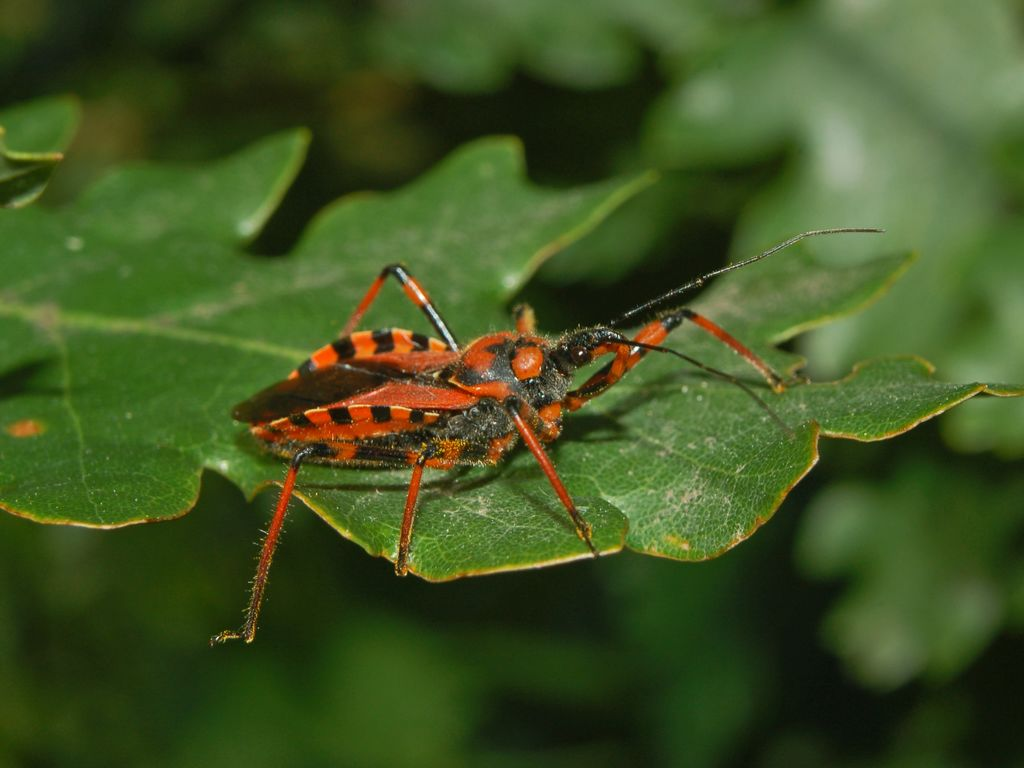
- Lateral view

Scientific classification
- Domain: Eukaryota
- Kingdom: Animalia
- Phylum: Arthropoda
- Class: Insecta
- Order: Hemiptera
- Suborder: Heteroptera
- Family: Reduviidae
- Subfamily: Harpactorinae
- Tribe: Harpactorini
- Genus: Rhynocoris
- Species: R. rubricus

Binomial name
- Rhynocoris rubricus (Germar, 1814)

= Rhynocoris rubricus =

Species of true bug

Rhynocoris rubricus is a species belonging to the family Reduviidae, subfamily Harpactorinae.

The base of the scutellum is slightly longer or equal to its height, the front lobe of pronotum is red and femora have a narrow black band.

This species is mainly found in France, Italy, Slovenia, Croatia and Albania.
