= Rhabdoblennius papuensis =

Conservation status
- Data Deficient (IUCN 3.1)

Scientific classification
- Kingdom: Animalia
- Phylum: Chordata
- Class: Actinopterygii
- Order: Blenniiformes
- Family: Blenniidae
- Genus: Rhabdoblennius
- Species: R. papuensis

Binomial name
- Rhabdoblennius papuensis Bath, 2004

Species of fish

Rhabdoblennius papuensis, the Papuan blenny, is a species of combtooth blenny found in the western Pacific ocean, around Papua New Guinea. This species reaches a length of 3.9 centimetres (1.5 in) SL. In 2004, this species along with Rhabdoblennius nigropunctatus, became the most recently described members of the genus Rhabdoblennius.
