= Rhynocoris albopilosus =

Scientific classification
- Kingdom: Animalia
- Phylum: Arthropoda
- Class: Insecta
- Order: Hemiptera
- Suborder: Heteroptera
- Family: Reduviidae
- Genus: Rhynocoris
- Species: R. albopilosus

Binomial name
- Rhynocoris albopilosus (Signoret, 1858)

Species of true bug

Rhynocoris albopilosus is a species of assassin bug in the Harpactorinae subfamily. This species, which is found in West Africa, exhibits a degree of male parental care, with males standing watch over females' eggs.
