= Rhabdoblennius snowi =

Conservation status
- Least Concern (IUCN 3.1)

Scientific classification
- Kingdom: Animalia
- Phylum: Chordata
- Class: Actinopterygii
- Order: Blenniiformes
- Family: Blenniidae
- Genus: Rhabdoblennius
- Species: R. snowi

Binomial name
- Rhabdoblennius snowi (Fowler, 1928)

Synonyms
- Blennius snowi Fowler, 1928; Salarias walensis Herre, 1935

Species of fish

Rhabdoblennius snowi, Snow's rockskipper or the Snow blenny, is a species of combtooth blenny found in coral reefs in the Pacific ocean. This species reaches a length of 7 centimetres (2.8 in) TL. The specific name of this blenny honours the collector of the type, the missionary Benjamin Galen Snow (1817-1880).
