= Rhabdoblennius nigropunctatus =

Conservation status
- Least Concern (IUCN 3.1)

Scientific classification
- Kingdom: Animalia
- Phylum: Chordata
- Class: Actinopterygii
- Order: Blenniiformes
- Family: Blenniidae
- Genus: Rhabdoblennius
- Species: R. nigropunctatus

Binomial name
- Rhabdoblennius nigropunctatus Bath, 2004

Species of fish

Rhabdoblennius nigropunctatus is a species of combtooth blenny found in the western Pacific Ocean, around Fiji and Tonga. This species reaches a length of 6.2 centimetres (2.4 in) TL. Along with Rhabdoblennius papuensis in 2004 it was the most recently described member of it genus.
