= Rhabdoblennius =

Scientific classification
- Kingdom: Animalia
- Phylum: Chordata
- Class: Actinopterygii
- Order: Blenniiformes
- Family: Blenniidae
- Subfamily: Salariinae
- Genus: Rhabdoblennius; Whitley, 1930

Type species
- Blennius rhabdotrachelus Fowler & Ball, 1924

Genus of fishes

Rhabdoblennius is a genus of combtooth blennies found in the Pacific Ocean, mostly in the western Pacific. The name of this genus is derived from the Greek word rhabdos meaning "stick" or "rod" and blennius meaning "mucus", referring to the absence of scales on the body of blennies.

== Species ==
There are currently five recognized species in this genus:

- Rhabdoblennius nigropunctatus Bath, 2004
- Rhabdoblennius nitidus (Günther, 1861) (Barred-chin blenny)
- Rhabdoblennius papuensis Bath, 2004
- Rhabdoblennius rhabdotrachelus (Fowler & Ball, 1924) (Barchin blenny)
- Rhabdoblennius snowi (Fowler, 1928) (Snow's rockskipper)
