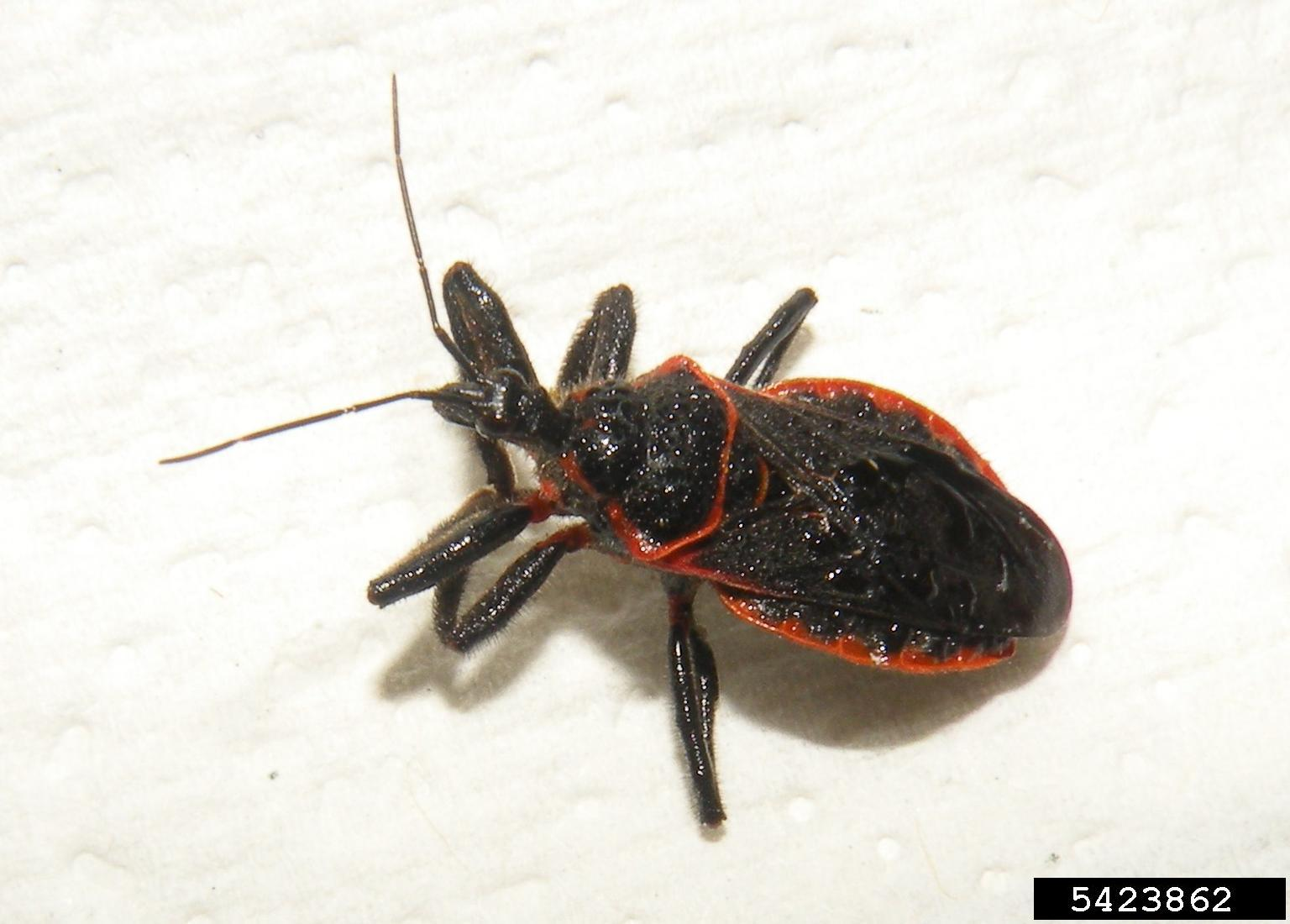

Scientific classification
- Domain: Eukaryota
- Kingdom: Animalia
- Phylum: Arthropoda
- Class: Insecta
- Order: Hemiptera
- Suborder: Heteroptera
- Family: Reduviidae
- Genus: Rhynocoris
- Species: R. ventralis

Binomial name
- Rhynocoris ventralis (Say, 1832)

Synonyms
- Rhynocoris ventralis americanus (Bergroth, 1897); Rhynocoris ventralis annulipes Van Duzee, 1914; Rhynocoris ventralis femoralis Van Duzee, 1914

= Rhynocoris ventralis =

Species of true bug

Rhynocoris ventralis is a species of assassin bug in the family Reduviidae. It is found in North America.

== Subspecies ==
These four subspecies belong to the species Rhynocoris ventralis:

- Rhynocoris ventralis americanus Bergroth, 1897
- Rhynocoris ventralis annulipes Van Duzee, 1914
- Rhynocoris ventralis femoralis Van Duzee, 1914
- Rhynocoris ventralis ventralis Say, 1832
