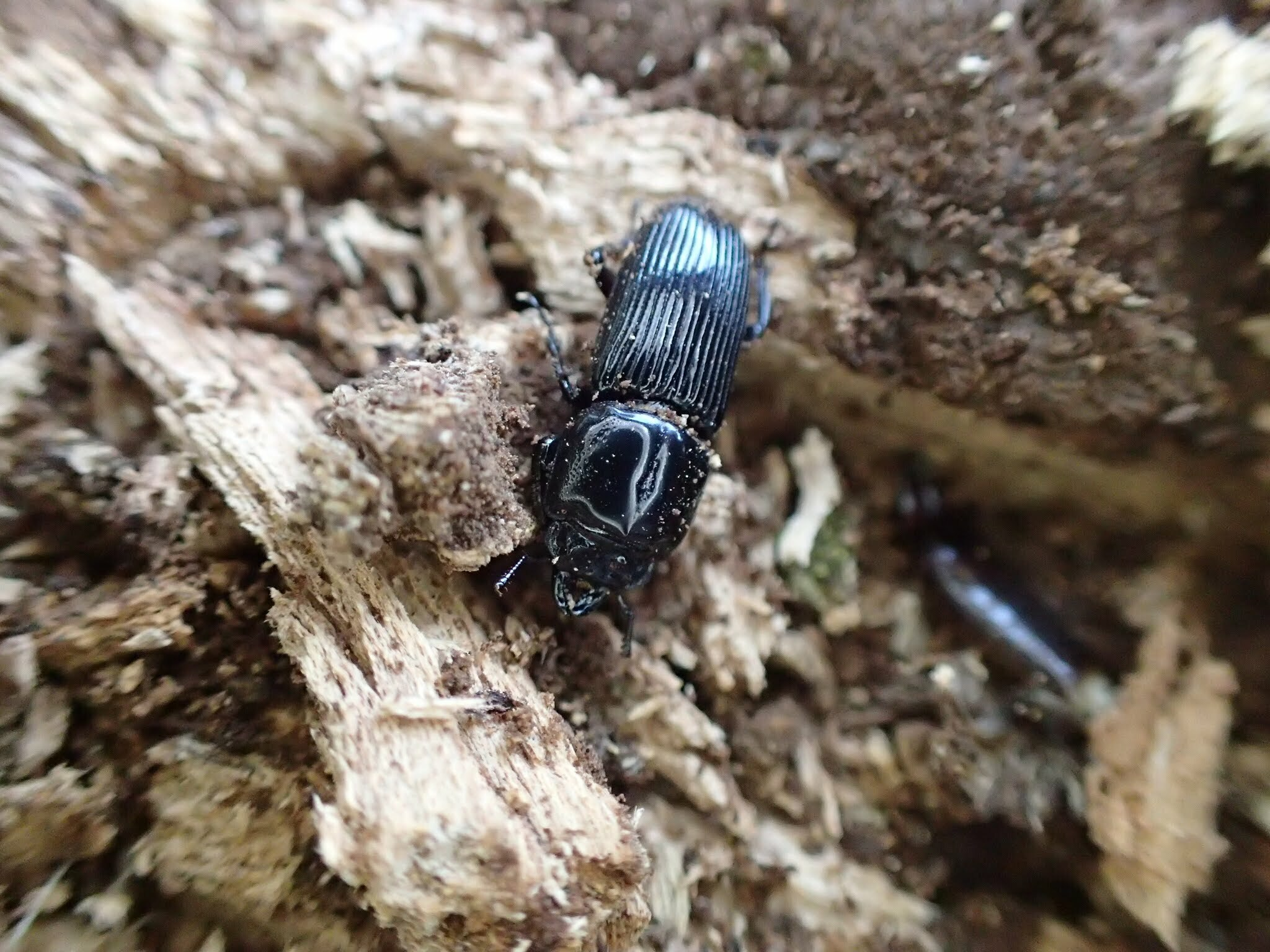
- Figulus binodulus, Japan

Scientific classification
- Domain: Eukaryota
- Kingdom: Animalia
- Phylum: Arthropoda
- Class: Insecta
- Order: Coleoptera
- Suborder: Polyphaga
- Infraorder: Scarabaeiformia
- Family: Lucanidae
- Subfamily: Lucaninae
- Genus: Figulus
- Species: F. binodulus

Binomial name
- Figulus binodulus Waterhouse, 1872

Synonyms
- Figulus yunnanensis Nagel, 1928

= Figulus binodulus =

Species of beetle

Figulus binodulus is a species in the stag beetle family Lucanidae. It is found in temperate Asia.
