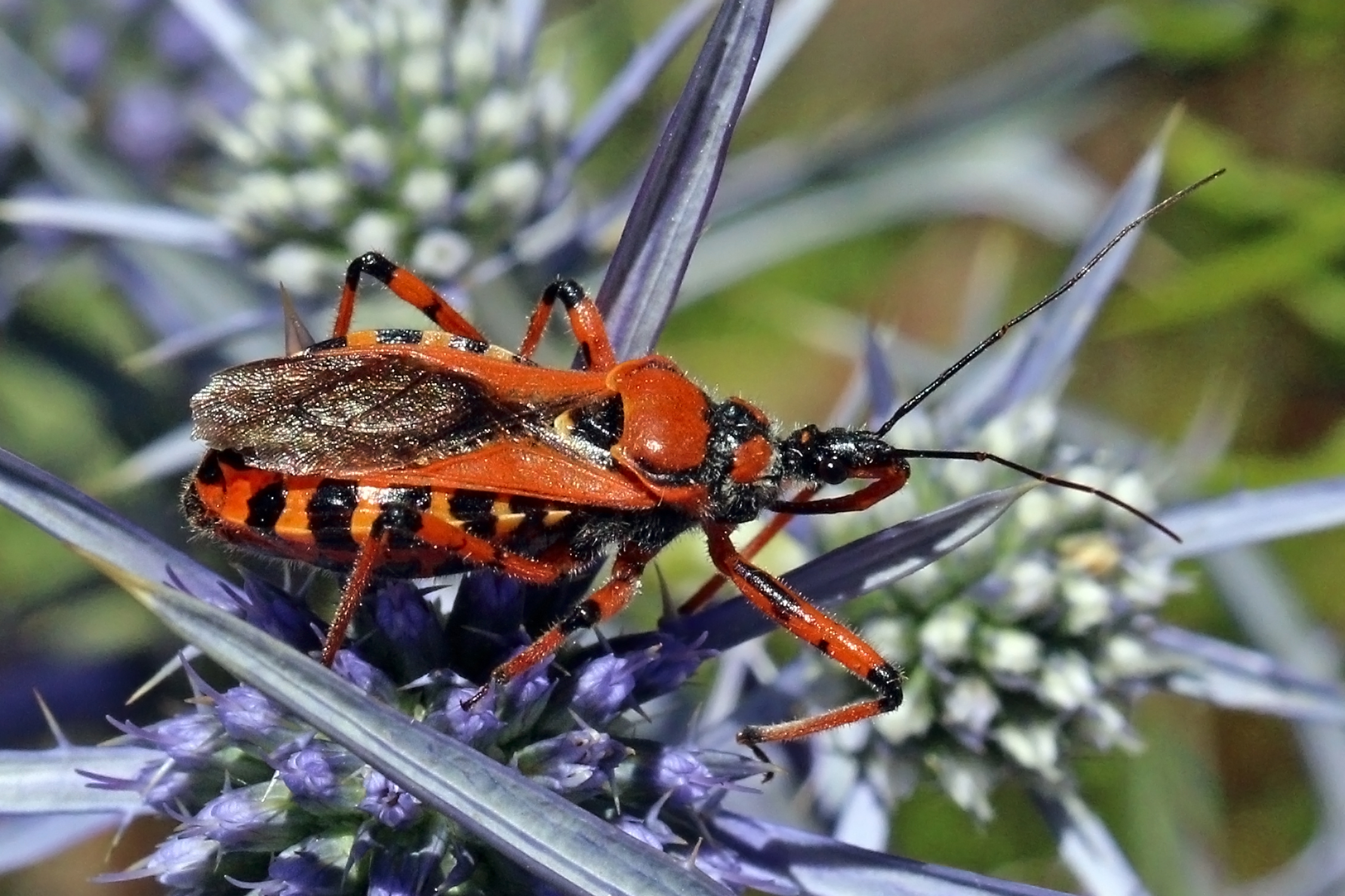
- In North Macedonia

Scientific classification
- Domain: Eukaryota
- Kingdom: Animalia
- Phylum: Arthropoda
- Class: Insecta
- Order: Hemiptera
- Suborder: Heteroptera
- Family: Reduviidae
- Genus: Rhynocoris
- Species: R. iracundus

Binomial name
- Rhynocoris iracundus (Poda, 1761)

= Rhynocoris iracundus =

Species of true bug

Rhynocoris iracundus is an assassin bug belonging to the family Reduviidae, subfamily Harpactorinae. The species was first described by Nikolaus Poda von Neuhaus in 1761.

Rhynocoris iracundus differs in colour from R. erythropus in that the sides of the abdomen in R. erythropus are yellow/orange and black, instead of the red and black seen in R. iracundus. In general, the front lobe of the pronotum of R. iracundus is broadly blackened, while in R. rubricus it is red. Furthermore, R. iracundus has narrower red stripes on its legs and abdomen. The base of scutellum is twice as long as the height.

This species is found in many parts of Europe.

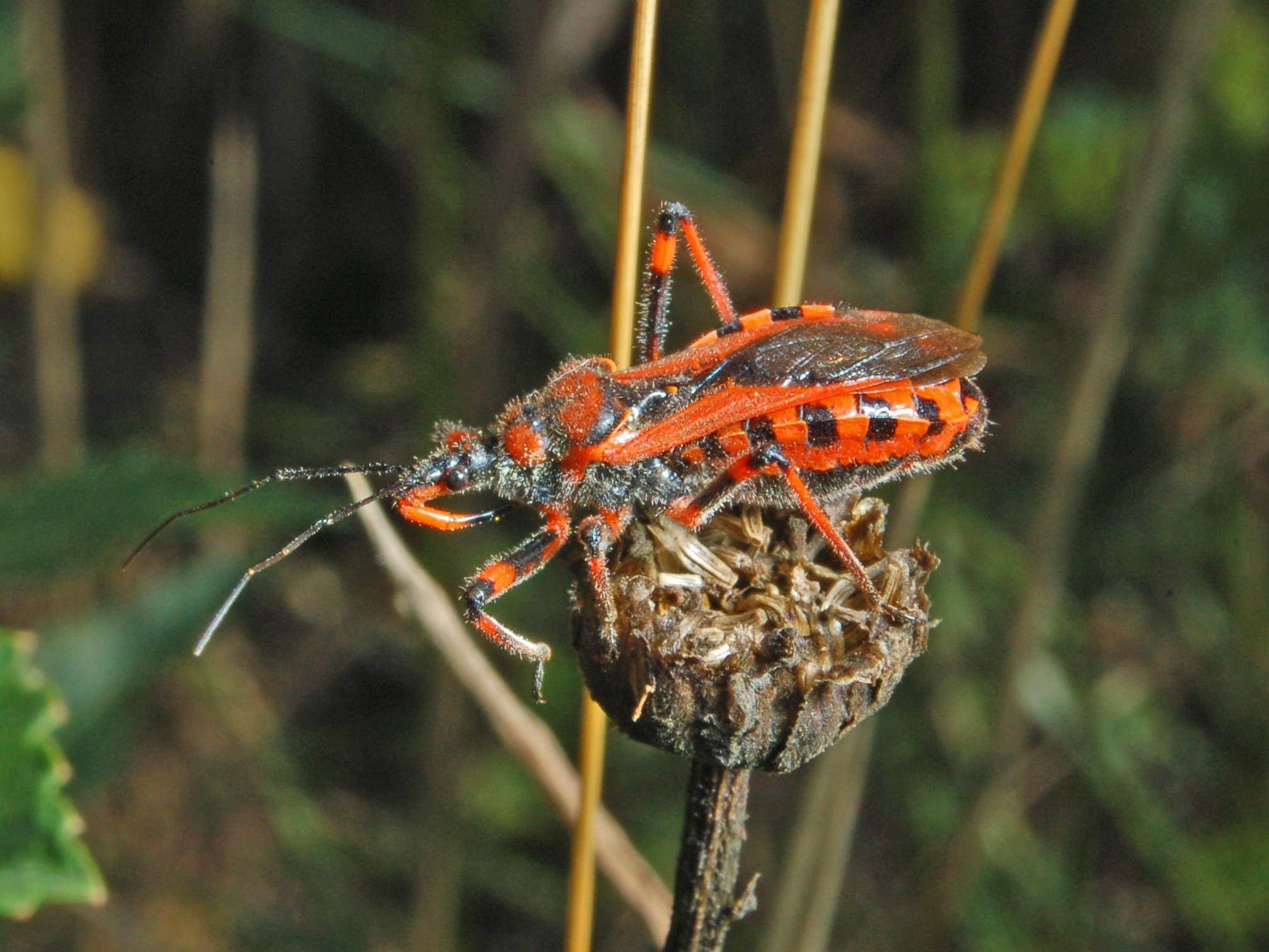

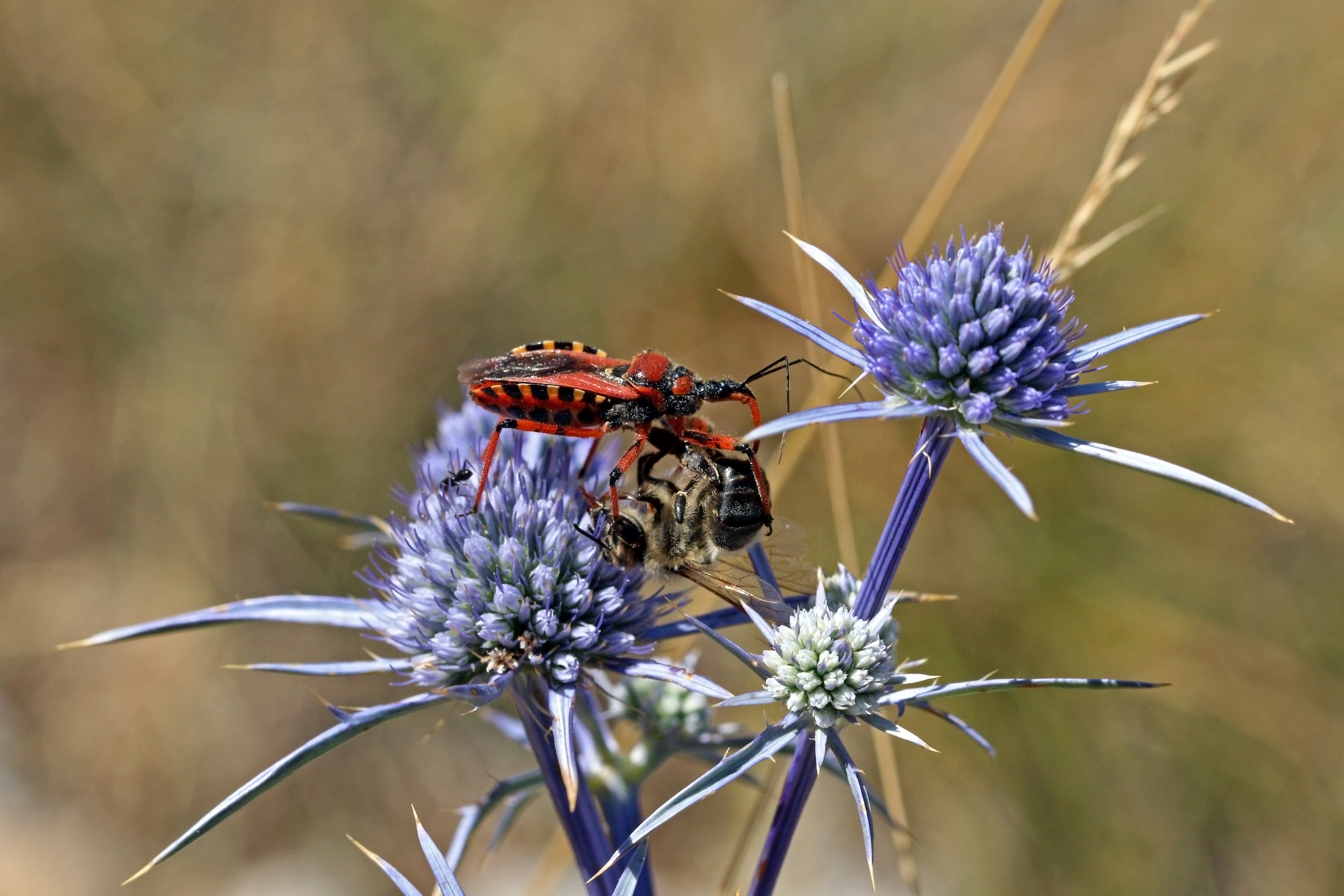
With prey
