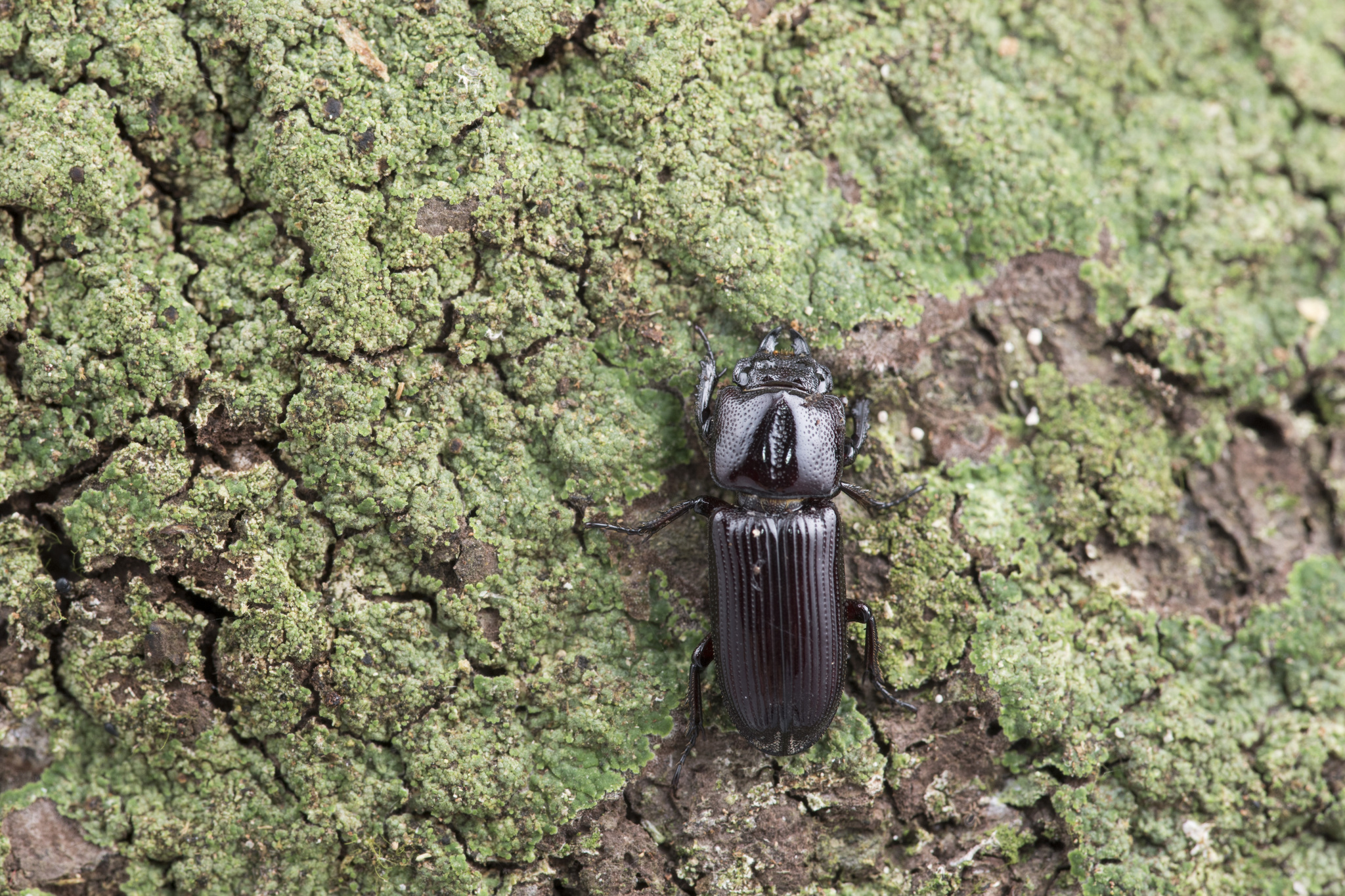
- Figulus punctatus, Taiwan

Scientific classification
- Domain: Eukaryota
- Kingdom: Animalia
- Phylum: Arthropoda
- Class: Insecta
- Order: Coleoptera
- Suborder: Polyphaga
- Infraorder: Scarabaeiformia
- Family: Lucanidae
- Subfamily: Lucaninae
- Genus: Figulus
- Species: F. punctatus

Binomial name
- Figulus punctatus Waterhouse, 1872

= Figulus punctatus =

Species of beetle

Figulus punctatus is a species in the stag beetle family Lucanidae. It is found in temperate Asia.

== Subspecies ==
These two subspecies belong to the species Figulus punctatus:

- Figulus punctatus daitoensis Fujita & Ichikawa, 1986 (Japan)
- Figulus punctatus punctatus Waterhouse, 1872 (Japan, Korea, Taiwan)
