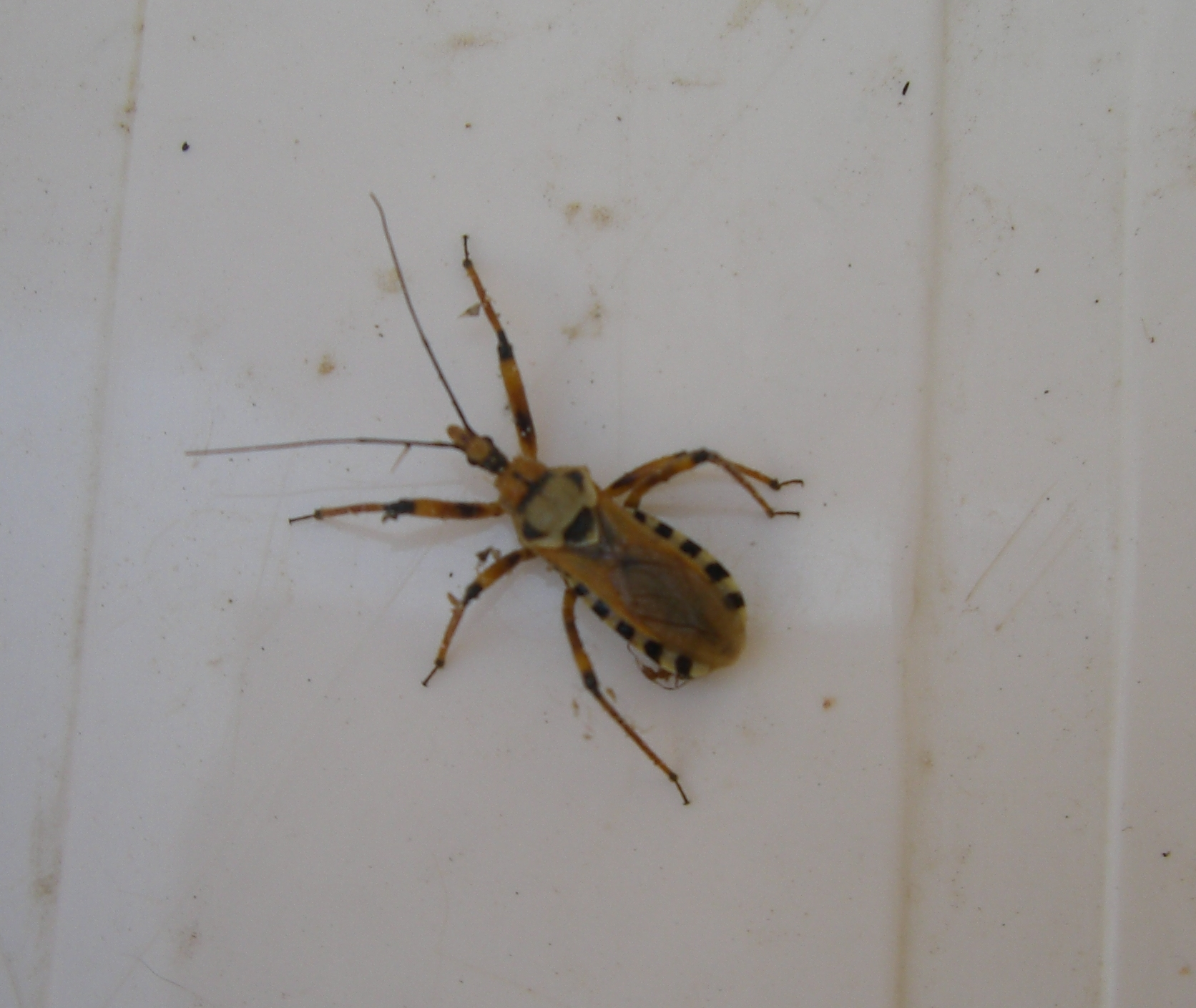

Scientific classification
- Domain: Eukaryota
- Kingdom: Animalia
- Phylum: Arthropoda
- Class: Insecta
- Order: Hemiptera
- Suborder: Heteroptera
- Family: Reduviidae
- Genus: Rhynocoris
- Species: R. punctiventris

Binomial name
- Rhynocoris punctiventris (Herrich-Schaeffer, 1848)

= Rhynocoris punctiventris =

Species of assassin bug

Rhynocoris punctiventris, the spotted assassin bug, is a species of assassin bug in the Harpactorinae subfamily.

== Range ==
The species can be considered eastern-mediterranean. It has also been recorded in Romania, Armenia and Ukraine.

== Ecology ==
As a member of the Hemiptera order, or true bugs, Rhynocoris punctiventris has beak-like mouthparts to suck liquid from plants or other insects. Though little is known about the species' diet, based on other Rhynocoris species it can be inferred that R. punctiventris are generalist predators, feeding on plants and various insects.
