= Figulus incertus =

Scientific classification
- Kingdom: Animalia
- Phylum: Arthropoda
- Clade: Pancrustacea
- Class: Insecta
- Order: Coleoptera
- Suborder: Polyphaga
- Infraorder: Scarabaeiformia
- Family: Lucanidae
- Subfamily: Lucaninae
- Tribe: Figulini
- Genus: Figulus
- Species: F. incertus

Binomial name
- Figulus incertus Bomans, 1987

Species of beetle

Figulus incertus is a species of stag beetle (insects of the family Lucanidae).

== Geographical distribution ==
The species is found in New Guinea.

Originally recorded only from Redscar Bay, it was later also found approximately 780 km from there, in a sample of rotten Hevea brasiliensis wood from East Sepik Province.
