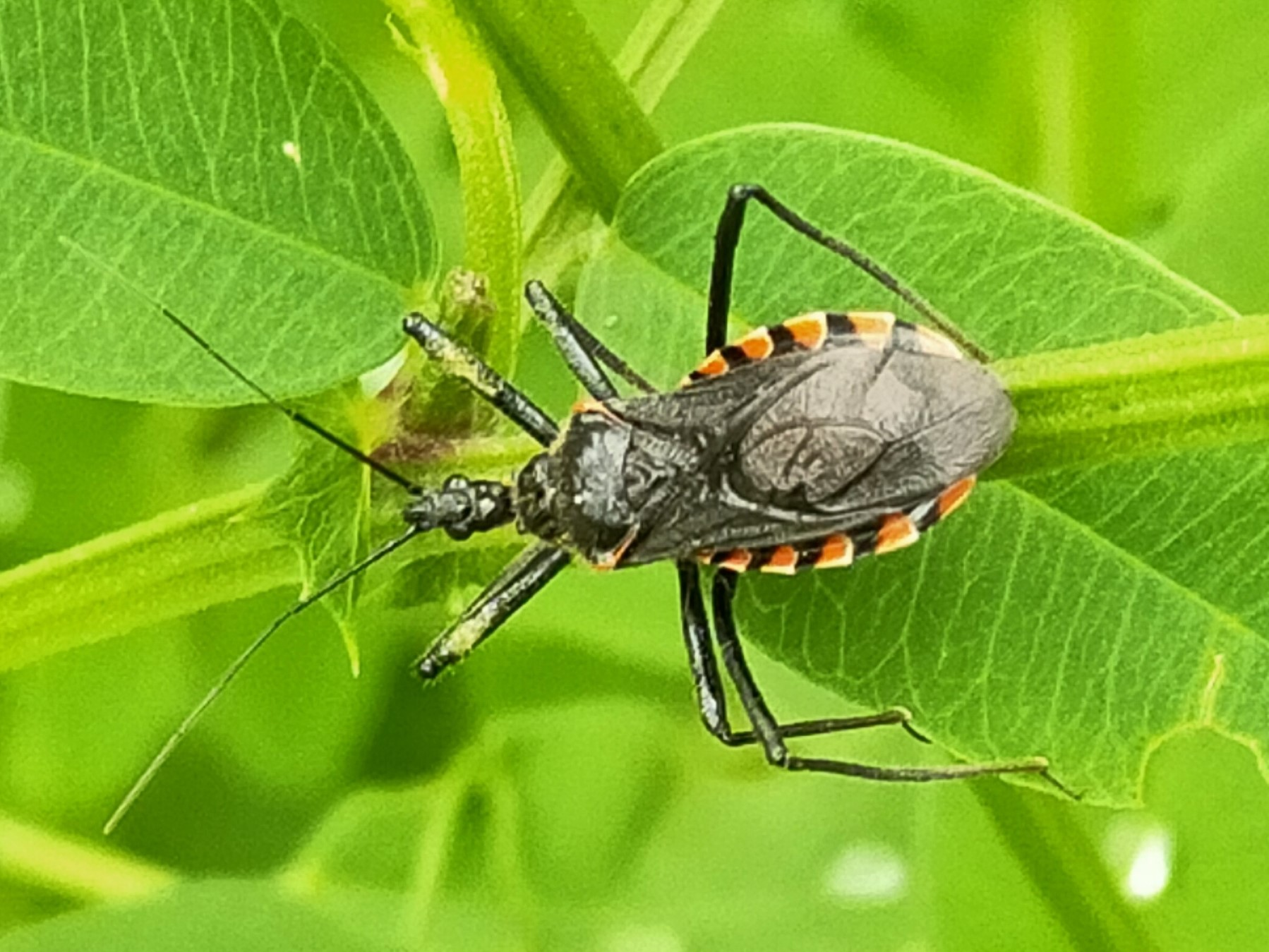

Scientific classification
- Domain: Eukaryota
- Kingdom: Animalia
- Phylum: Arthropoda
- Class: Insecta
- Order: Hemiptera
- Suborder: Heteroptera
- Family: Reduviidae
- Tribe: Harpactorini
- Genus: Rhynocoris
- Species: R. leucospilus

Binomial name
- Rhynocoris leucospilus (Stål, 1859)

= Rhynocoris leucospilus =

Species of true bug

Rhynocoris leucospilus is a species of assassin bug in the family Reduviidae. It is found in Europe, northern Asia (excluding China) and North America.

== Subspecies ==
These five subspecies belong to the species Rhynocoris leucospilus:

- Rhynocoris leucospilus altaicus Kiritshenko, 1926
- Rhynocoris leucospilus dybowski (Jakovlev, 1876)
- Rhynocoris leucospilus leucospilus
- Rhynocoris leucospilus rubromarginatus (Dispons & Stichel, 1893)
- Rhynocoris leucospilus sibiricus (Jakovlev, 1893)
