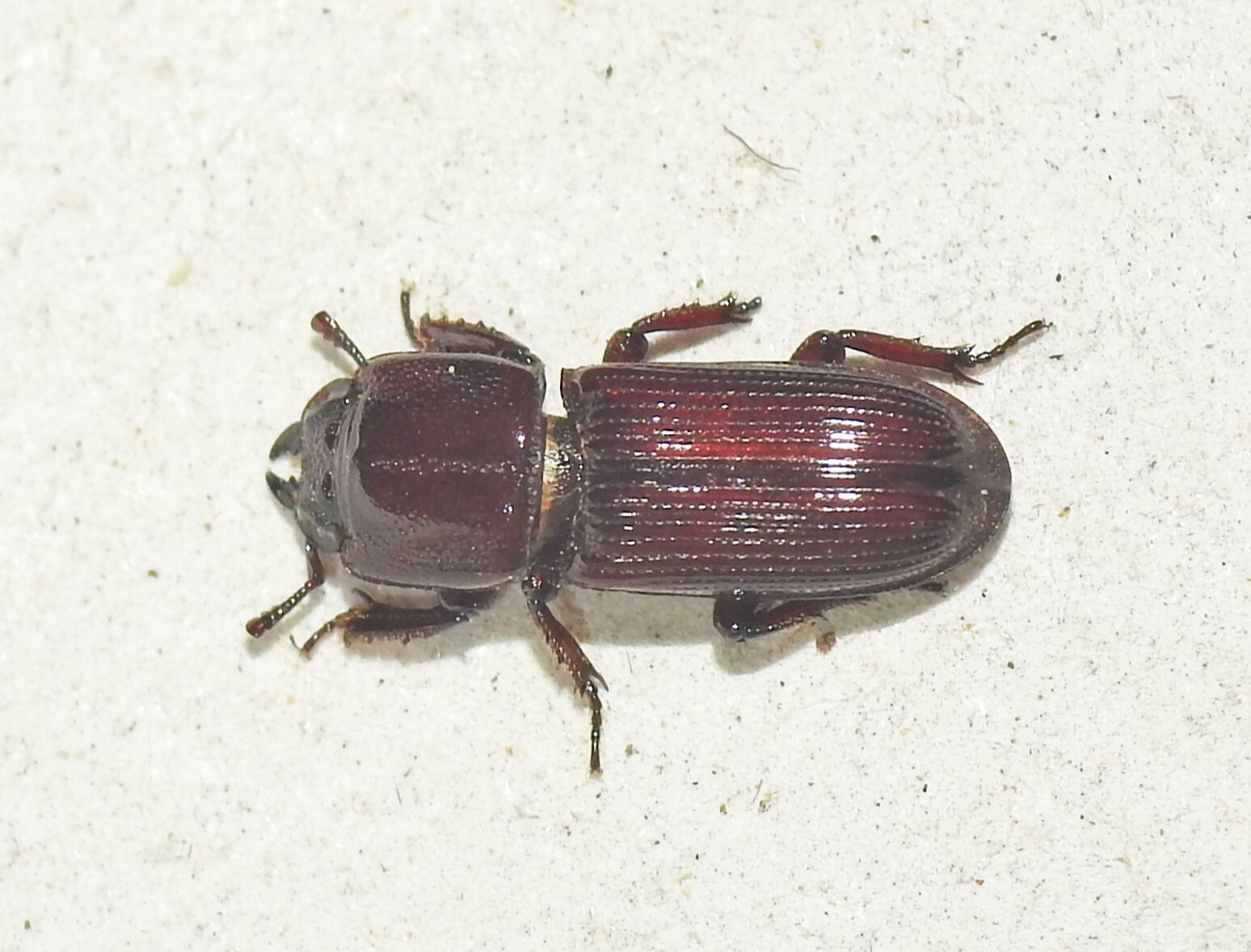
- Figulus lilliputanus, Australia

Scientific classification
- Kingdom: Animalia
- Phylum: Arthropoda
- Class: Insecta
- Order: Coleoptera
- Suborder: Polyphaga
- Infraorder: Scarabaeiformia
- Family: Lucanidae
- Subfamily: Lucaninae
- Tribe: Figulini
- Genus: Figulus
- Species: F. lilliputanus

Binomial name
- Figulus lilliputanus Westwood, 1855

Synonyms
- Figulus clivinoides Thomson, 1862

= Figulus lilliputanus =

Species of beetle

Figulus lilliputanus is a species in the stag beetle family Lucanidae. It is found in Australia.
