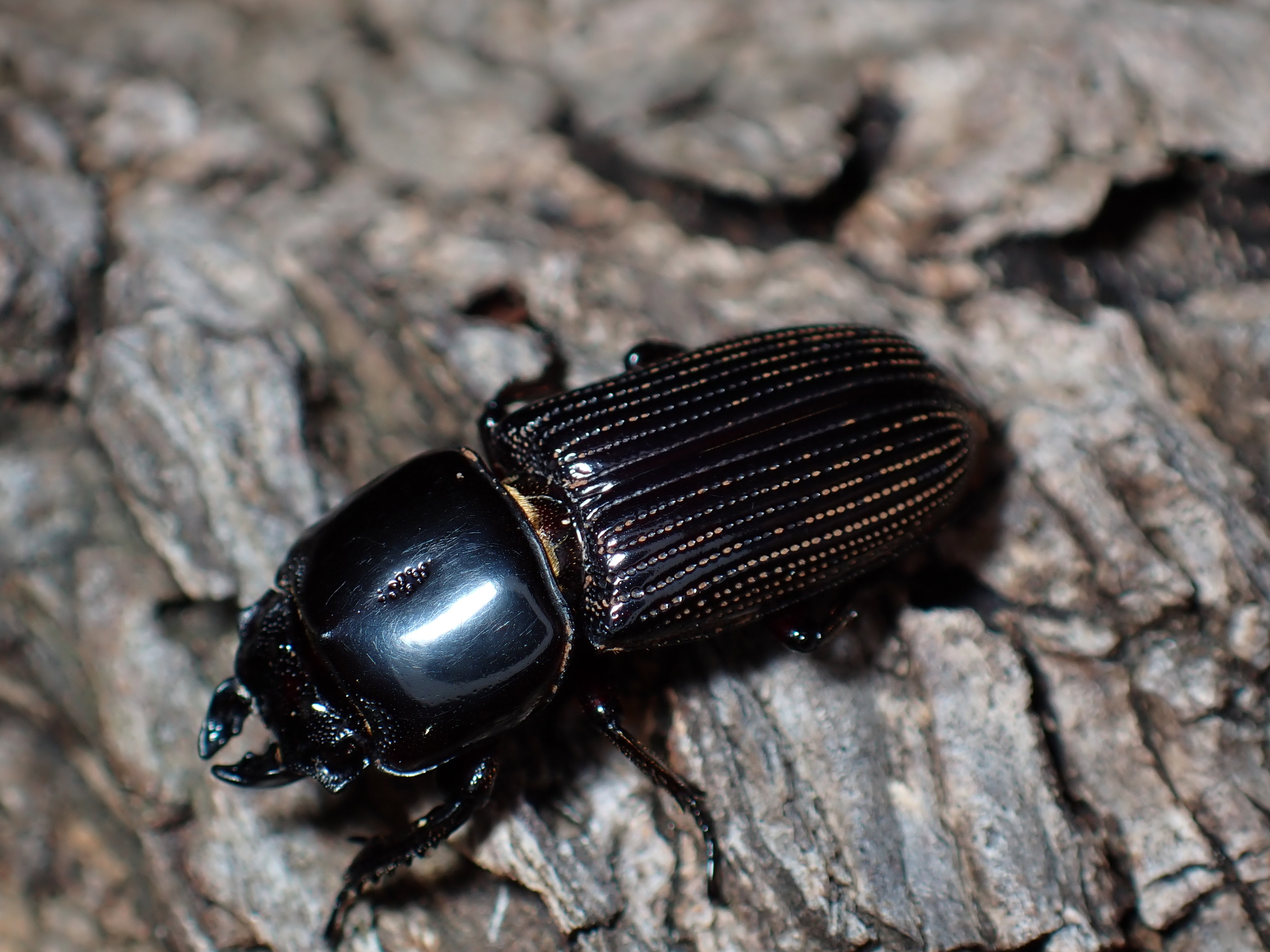
- Figulus foveicollis, Vanuatu

Scientific classification
- Domain: Eukaryota
- Kingdom: Animalia
- Phylum: Arthropoda
- Class: Insecta
- Order: Coleoptera
- Suborder: Polyphaga
- Infraorder: Scarabaeiformia
- Family: Lucanidae
- Subfamily: Lucaninae
- Genus: Figulus
- Species: F. foveicollis

Binomial name
- Figulus foveicollis (Boisduval, 1835)

Synonyms
- Figulus foveicollis gazellae Kriesche, 1922; Figulus insularis Blanchard, 1853; Figulus lifuanus Montrouzier, 1860; Figulus napoides Kriesche, 1922; Figulus woodlarkianus Montrouzier, 1855; Platycerus foveicollis Boisduval, 1835

= Figulus foveicollis =

Species of beetle

Figulus foveicollis is a species in the stag beetle family Lucanidae. It is found in New Caledonia, New Guinea, and Tahiti.
