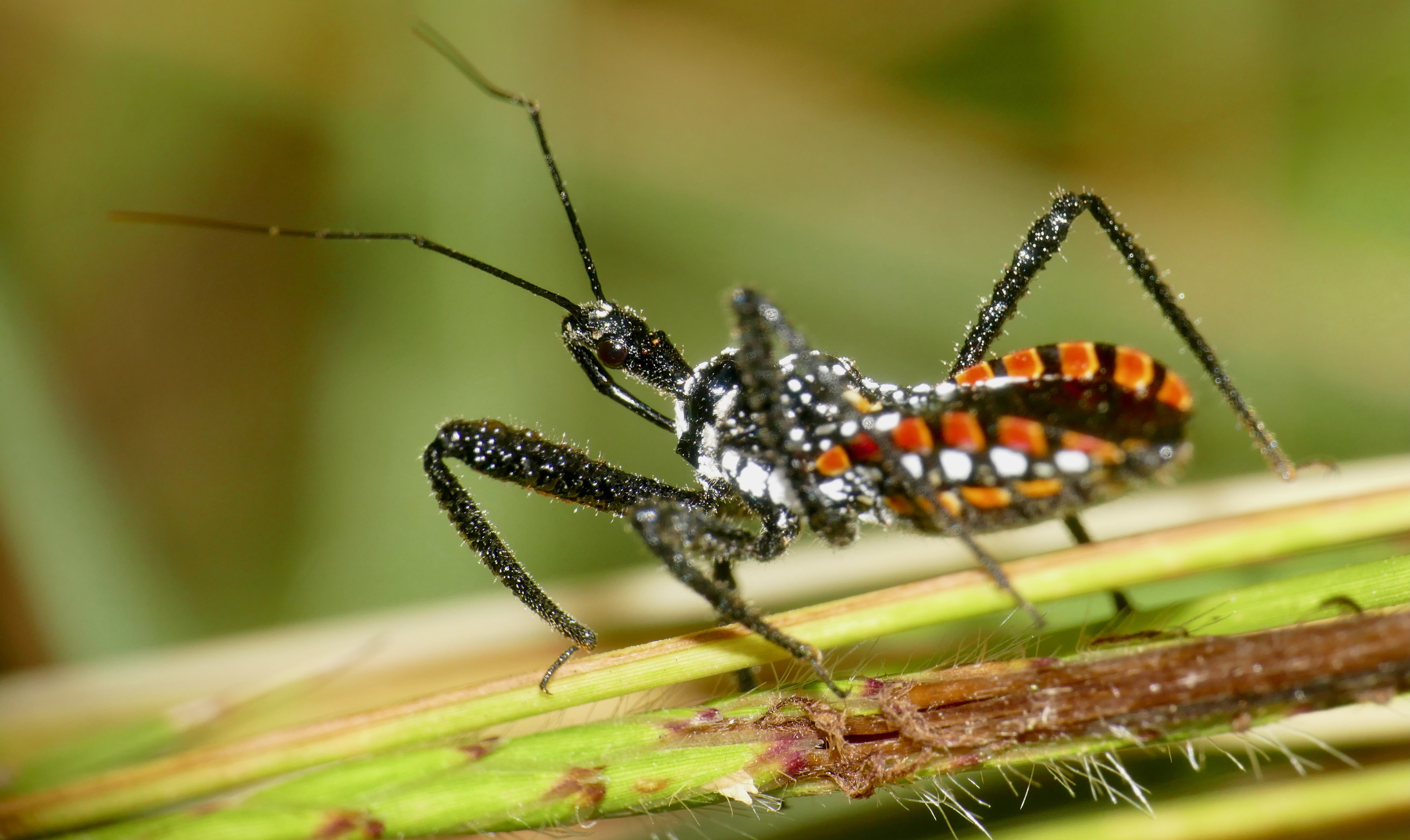

Scientific classification
- Domain: Eukaryota
- Kingdom: Animalia
- Phylum: Arthropoda
- Class: Insecta
- Order: Hemiptera
- Suborder: Heteroptera
- Family: Reduviidae
- Genus: Rhynocoris
- Species: R. albopunctatus

Binomial name
- Rhynocoris albopunctatus (Stål, 1855)

= Rhynocoris albopunctatus =

Species of true bug

Rhynocoris albopunctatus is a species of assassin bug family (Reduviidae), in the subfamily Harpactorinae. It is common in cotton plantations, especially near pastures where Stylosanthes gracilis is incorporated.

== Life history ==
Rhynocoris albopunctatus preys upon larvae of Heliothis armigera (Hübner), Earias biplaga Walker, and Earias insulana Boisduval.

== Gallery ==
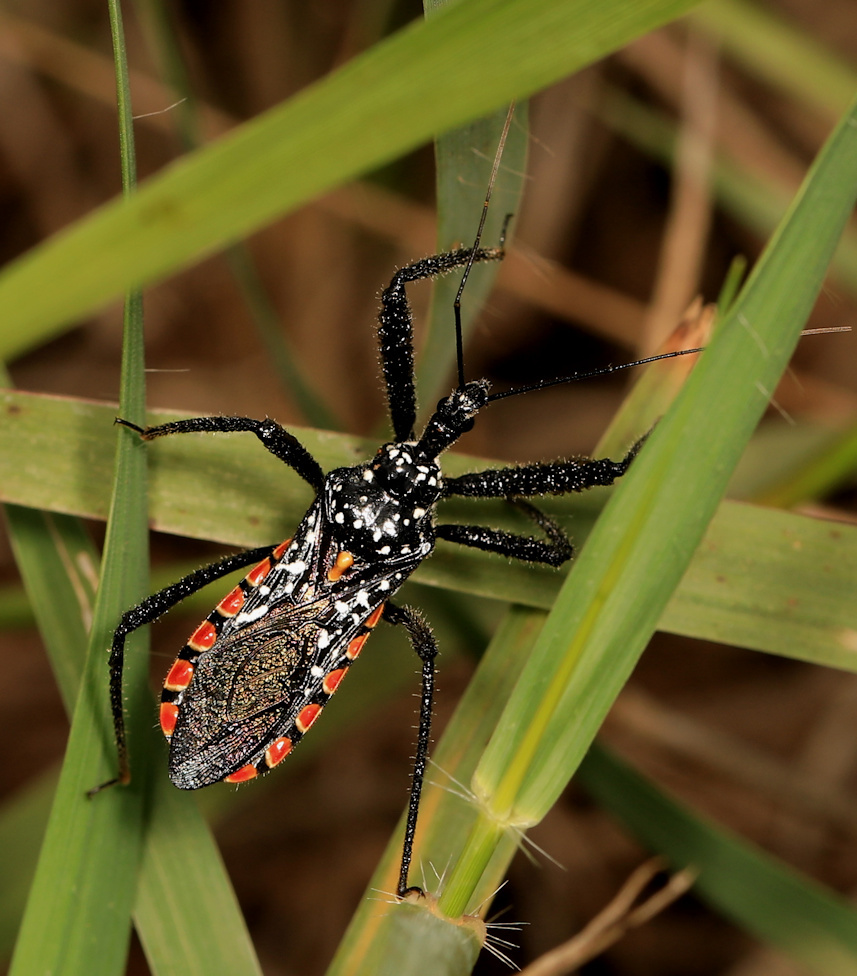
