= Rhabdoblennius rhabdotrachelus =

Conservation status
- Least Concern (IUCN 3.1)

Scientific classification
- Kingdom: Animalia
- Phylum: Chordata
- Class: Actinopterygii
- Order: Blenniiformes
- Family: Blenniidae
- Genus: Rhabdoblennius
- Species: R. rhabdotrachelus

Binomial name
- Rhabdoblennius rhabdotrachelus (Fowler & Ball, 1924)

Synonyms
- Blennius rhabdotrachelus Fowler & Ball, 1924

Species of fish

Rhabdoblennius rhabdotrachelus, the barchin blenny, is a species of combtooth blenny found in the Pacific ocean. This species reaches a length of 4.1 centimetres (1.6 in) SL.
