= Rhynocoris longifrons =

Scientific classification
- Domain: Eukaryota
- Kingdom: Animalia
- Phylum: Arthropoda
- Class: Insecta
- Order: Hemiptera
- Suborder: Heteroptera
- Family: Reduviidae
- Tribe: Harpactorini
- Genus: Rhynocoris
- Species: R. longifrons

Binomial name
- Rhynocoris longifrons (Stål, 1874)

Species of assassin bug

Rhynocoris longifrons is a species of assassin bug in the family Reduviidae. It is a predator of other insects and is found in Asia. Crops on which it is found feeding on pests include pigeon pea, cardamom and peanuts. The insects are potentially useful in biological control because they are more resistant to pesticides than are the pests they consume.

== Distribution ==
Rhynocoris longifrons is found in various parts of India including Tamil Nadu, and often occurs in agro-ecosystems. It is a generalist predator.

== Biology ==
Like other hemipterans, assassin bugs are hemimetabolous and do not undergo metamorphosis. Instead, the egg hatches into a miniature version of the adult form, and at each growth stage the nymph resembles the adult more than the previous one. Predatory assassin bugs use their long rostrums to inject toxic saliva into their prey; this liquefies the soft tissues which are then sucked out, and prey larger than the bug can be killed in this way. Rhynocoris longifrons is a polyphagous predator with a wide range of prey including a number of insect pests. These include Exelastis atomosa, a pest of pigeon pea, Nezara viridula, a pest of beans, and Riptortus pedestris.

== Use in biological control ==
Rhynocoris longifrons has been investigated for use in biological control of three sap-sucking pests of cotton, the red cotton stainer Dysdercus cingulatus, the mealybug Phenacoccus solenopsis and the greenfly Aphis gossypii. In general, both adults and nymphs of R. longifrons selectively chose adult P. solenopsis and A. gossypii rather than nymphs on which to feed, but preferred the partially grown nymphs of D. cingulatus to the adults. This predator exhibits a type II functional response, where the rate of prey consumption rises as the density of prey increases, but eventually reaches a plateau and rises no further. Other insect pests which the predator might control include the termite Odontotermes obesus, the brown plant bug Clavigralla gibbosa and the cotton bollworm Helicoverpa armigera.

Assassin bugs are attracted to their prey by odour. Olfactory tests have shown that Rhynocoris longifrons is more attracted to moth larvae than to hemipteran pests. Important moth pests to which it is attracted include Spodoptera litura, Achaea janata and Helicoverpa armigera. Volatile chemicals are emitted by the larvae and by the adult moths, including by their shed scales. These kairomones can help guide predators and the application of a solution of them to crops may attract Rhynocoris longifrons to feed on other pests despite the absence of moth larvae.
