= Rhynocoris tristis =

Scientific classification
- Domain: Eukaryota
- Kingdom: Animalia
- Phylum: Arthropoda
- Class: Insecta
- Order: Hemiptera
- Suborder: Heteroptera
- Family: Reduviidae
- Genus: Rhynocoris
- Species: R. tristis

Binomial name
- Rhynocoris tristis (Stål, 1855)

Species of true bug

Rhynocoris tristis is a species of assassin bug family (Reduviidae), in the subfamily Harpactorinae. R. tristis is a polyphagous predator found in sub-Saharan Africa.

== Life History ==
R. tristis is associated with Stylosanthes guinaensis, and this association is thought to be due to the prey species attracted by flowers of S. guinaensis. R. tristis is unusual in the insect world in that males provide paternal care by guarding egg masses from parasitic wasps and insect predators. Males will also cannibalize some of the eggs that they guard. R. tristis prefers to lay its eggs on the stems of plants, in contrast to most members of the harpactorinae, which prefer to lay them on the undersides of leaves.
