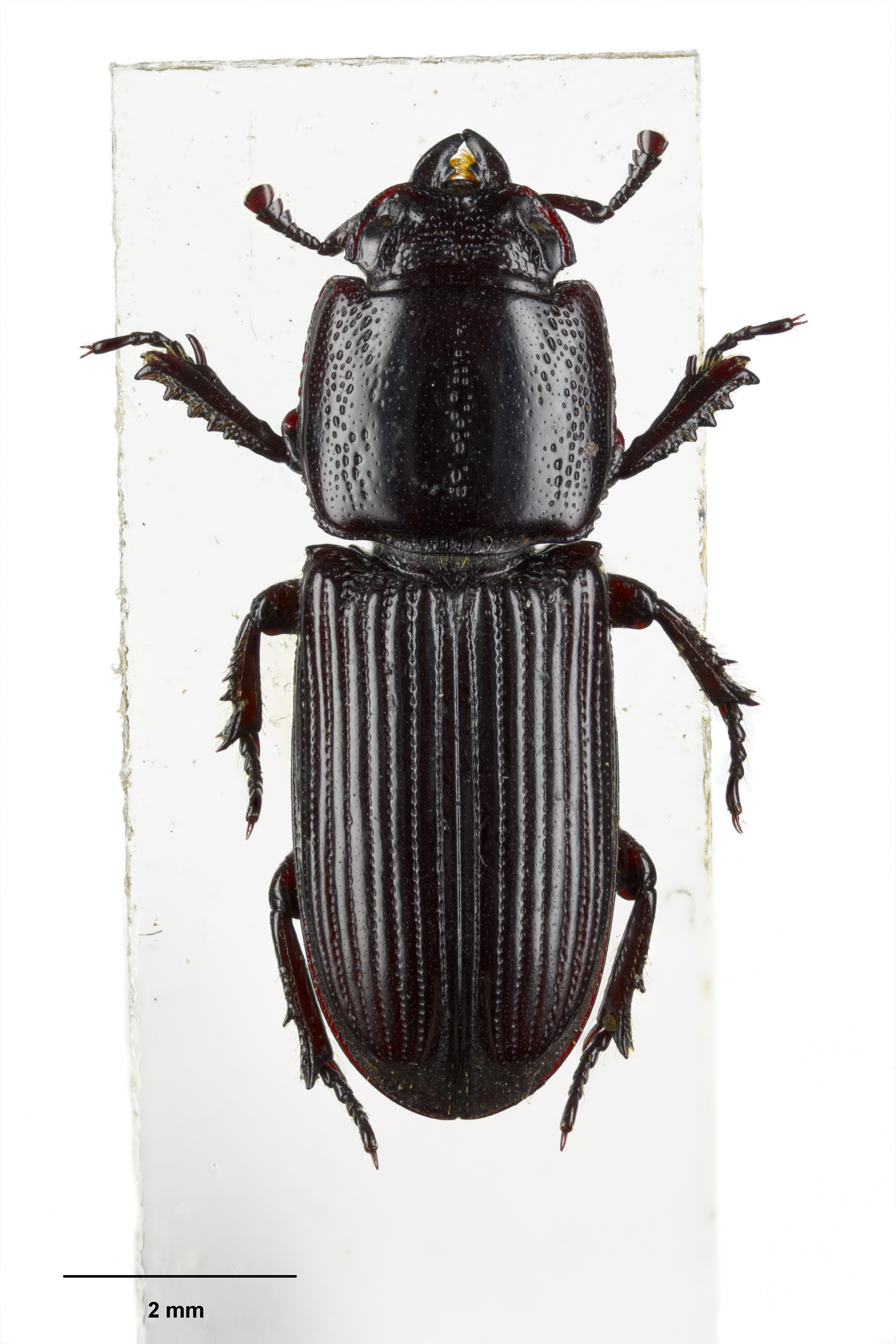
- Figulus hornabrooki, Papua New Guinea

Scientific classification
- Kingdom: Animalia
- Phylum: Arthropoda
- Class: Insecta
- Order: Coleoptera
- Suborder: Polyphaga
- Infraorder: Scarabaeiformia
- Family: Lucanidae
- Subfamily: Lucaninae
- Genus: Figulus
- Species: F. hornabrooki

Binomial name
- Figulus hornabrooki Bomans, 1987

= Figulus hornabrooki =

Species of beetle

Figulus hornabrooki is a species of Stag Beetle in the beetle family Lucanidae. It is native to the island of New Guinea, being found in both Indonesia and Papua New Guinea. First described by Bomans in 1987, it is one of many species within the genus Figulus.

== Description ==
Like other members of its genus, Figulus hornabrooki is a relatively small, black, and somewhat flattened stag beetle. The body is elongated, and the pronotum is broad, with mandibles that are shorter and more robust than those of many other lucanid genera. The exoskeleton is typically glossy, and the elytra (wing covers) are marked with distinct longitudinal striae (grooves). This morphology is well-suited for its lifestyle within decaying wood.

== Taxonomy ==
The species was first formally described by the Belgian entomologist J. Bomans in 1987. It belongs to the genus Figulus, a widespread genus of stag beetles with species found across Asia, Africa, and Australia. Within the family Lucanidae, it is classified under the subfamily Lucaninae.

== Distribution and habitat ==
Figulus hornabrooki is endemic to the island of New Guinea. Its range includes the Indonesian provinces of Papua and West Papua, as well as Papua New Guinea. The beetle is typically found in tropical rainforest environments, where it is associated with decaying wood.

== Ecology ==
As a member of the family Lucanidae, F. hornabrooki is a saproxylic insect. Its larvae feed on decaying wood, playing a role in the decomposition process and nutrient cycling within forest ecosystems. Adults are also often found in or under rotten logs, which serve as both a food source for their offspring and a habitat. The beetles are primarily nocturnal.
