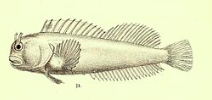

Conservation status
- Least Concern (IUCN 3.1)

Scientific classification
- Kingdom: Animalia
- Phylum: Chordata
- Class: Actinopterygii
- Order: Blenniiformes
- Family: Blenniidae
- Genus: Rhabdoblennius
- Species: R. nitidus

Binomial name
- Rhabdoblennius nitidus (Günther, 1861)

Synonyms
- Salarias nitidus Günther, 1861; Blennius nitidus (Günther, 1861); Blennius ellipes Jordan & Starks, 1906; Rhabdoblennius ellipes (Jordan & Starks, 1906)

= Rhabdoblennius nitidus =

Species of fish

Rhabdoblennius nitidus, the barred-chin blenny, is a species of combtooth blenny found in coral reefs in the western Pacific ocean. This species reaches a length of 8.3 centimetres (3.3 in) SL.
