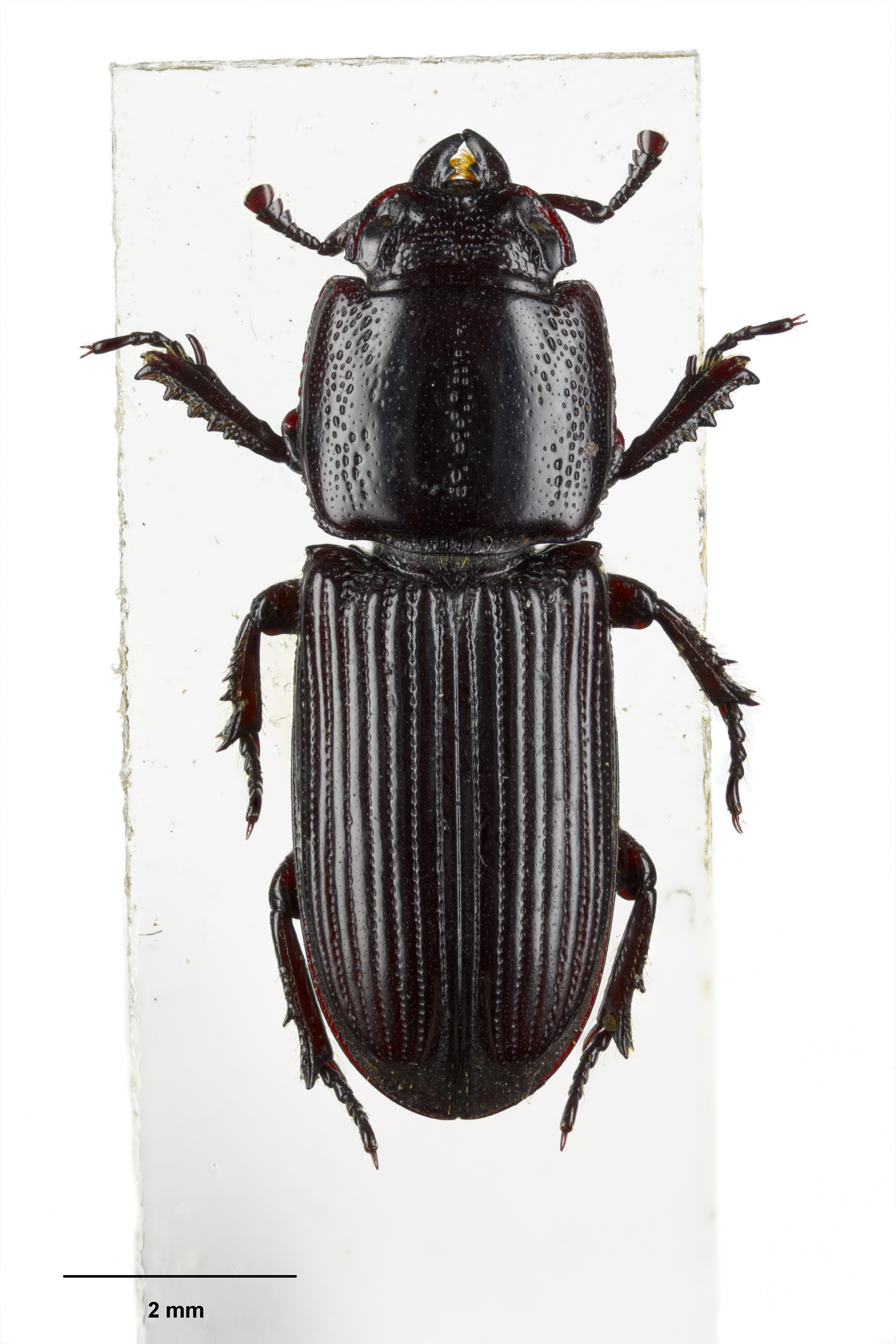
- Figulus hornabrooki

Scientific classification
- Kingdom: Animalia
- Phylum: Arthropoda
- Class: Insecta
- Order: Coleoptera
- Suborder: Polyphaga
- Infraorder: Scarabaeiformia
- Family: Lucanidae
- Subfamily: Lucaninae
- Genus: Figulus; Macleay, 1819

= Figulus (beetle) =

Genus of beetles

Figulus is a genus of beetle belonging to the Lucanidae family. They have a paleotropical distribution, including occurrences in Australia.

== Description ==
Figulus are small in size compared to other Lucanid genera, with an average length of 1-2 centimeters. They are blackish-brown in color, with clubbed antennae, as well as vertical striations down their elytra. Males and females do not exhibit sexually dimorphic traits.

== Habitat and distribution ==
Figulus are found in rotting wood in many tropical areas. They spend the majority of their life within wood, only emerging from the wood to mate. Populations of Figulus can be found in Japan, Taiwan, India, Australia, and several Southeast Asian islands. There are also isolated populations of this genus in sub-Saharan Africa, including Mauritius, as well as areas in and near the Gulf of Guinea.

== Life history ==
Larvae are herbivorous, feeding on rotting wood. They spend their entire larval phase within the wood. Unlike other stag beetle larvae, Figulus larvae complete their larval development within 3 months. As adults, this genus becomes carnivorous, feeding on small invertebrates found within wood. During their reproductive season, adults will disperse from the wood to find mates and eventually lay eggs in other sections of rotting wood.

=== Sociality ===
Unlike other Lucanids, this genus exhibits parental care. Adults in the species Figulus binodulus live with their larvae, helping to chew the wood in order for the larvae to digest it efficiently. Despite this, the greatest risk to larvae is filial cannibalism, however this is less likely to occur if individuals are closely related.

== Taxonomy ==
Within this genus, there are 146 described species. For a complete list of species, see list of Figulus species.
