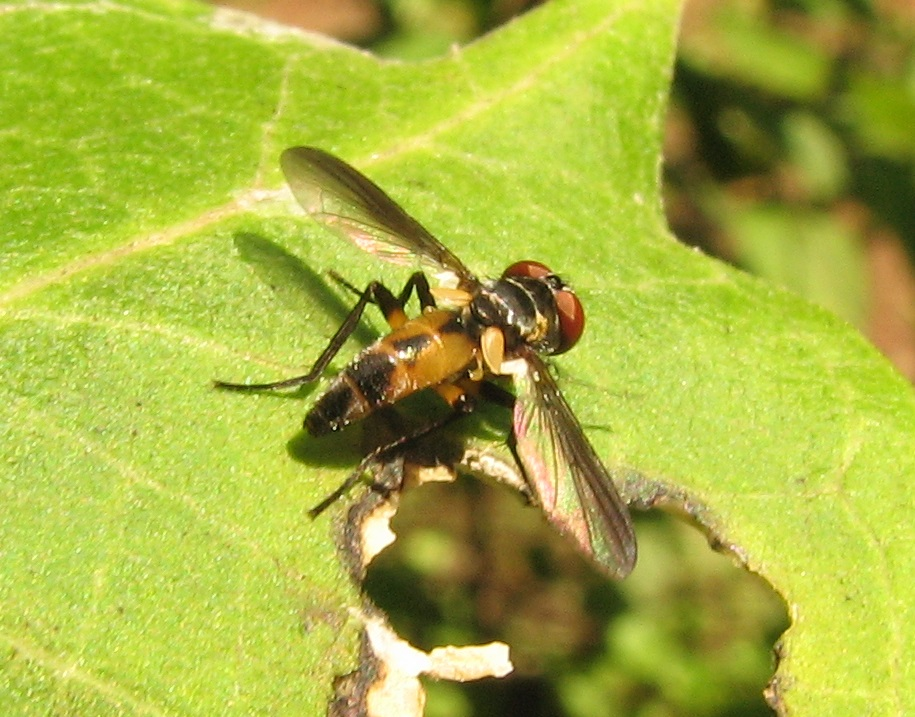

Scientific classification
- Kingdom: Animalia
- Phylum: Arthropoda
- Class: Insecta
- Order: Diptera
- Family: Tachinidae
- Subfamily: Phasiinae
- Tribe: Gymnosomatini
- Genus: Xanthomelanodes
- Species: X. arcuatus

Binomial name
- Xanthomelanodes arcuatus (Say, 1829)

Synonyms
- Ocyptera arcuata Say, 1829

= Xanthomelanodes arcuatus =

Species of fly

Xanthomelanodes arcuatus is a species of bristle fly in the family Tachinidae. Hosts for the larval form of this tachinid include species in the genus Pselliopus, such as Pselliopus barberi and Pselliopus cinctus.

== Distribution ==
Canada, United States, Mexico.
