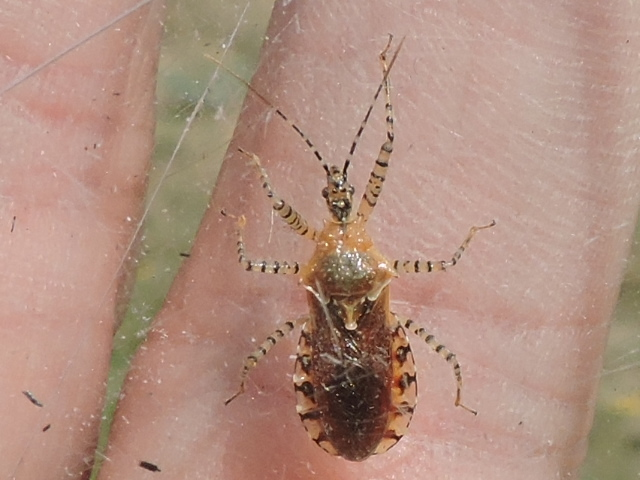

Scientific classification
- Domain: Eukaryota
- Kingdom: Animalia
- Phylum: Arthropoda
- Class: Insecta
- Order: Hemiptera
- Suborder: Heteroptera
- Family: Reduviidae
- Tribe: Harpactorini
- Genus: Pselliopus
- Species: P. latifasciatus

Binomial name
- Pselliopus latifasciatus Barber, 1924

= Pselliopus latifasciatus =

Species of true bug

Pselliopus latifasciatus is a species of assassin bug in the family Reduviidae. It is found in North America.
