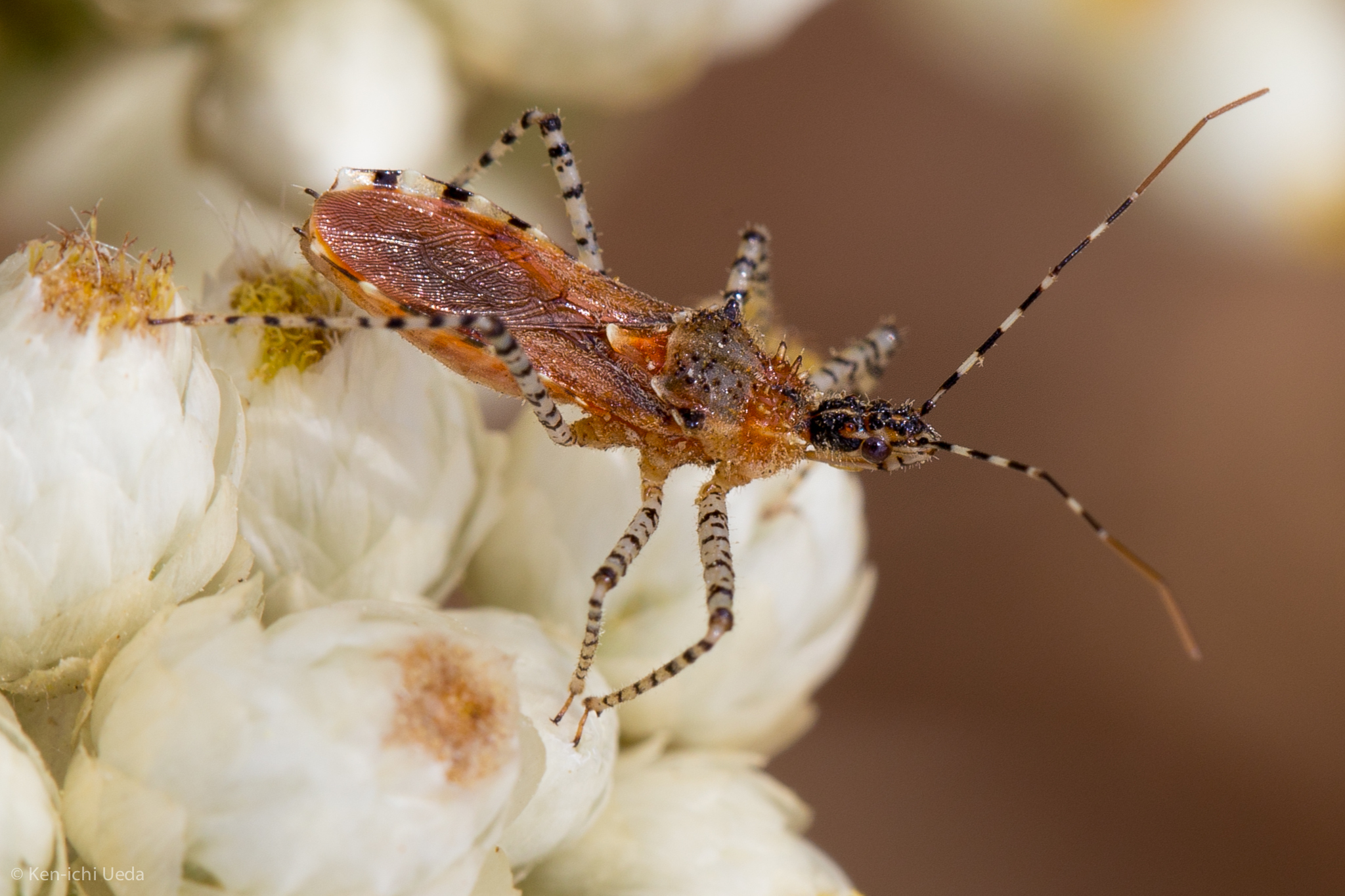

Scientific classification
- Domain: Eukaryota
- Kingdom: Animalia
- Phylum: Arthropoda
- Class: Insecta
- Order: Hemiptera
- Suborder: Heteroptera
- Family: Reduviidae
- Tribe: Harpactorini
- Genus: Pselliopus
- Species: P. spinicollis

Binomial name
- Pselliopus spinicollis (Champion, 1899)

= Pselliopus spinicollis =

Species of assassin bug

Pselliopus spinicollis is a species of assassin bug in the family Reduviidae. It is found in Central America and North America.
