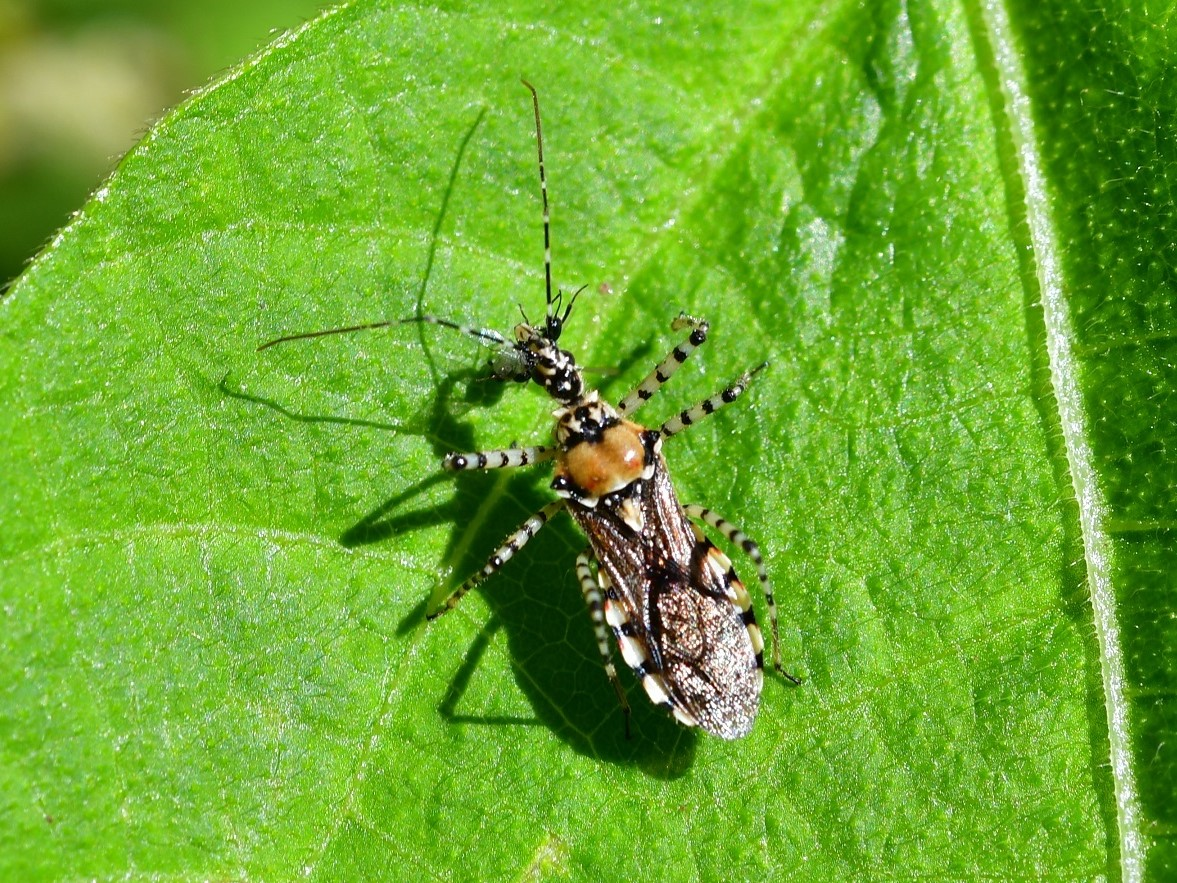

Scientific classification
- Kingdom: Animalia
- Phylum: Arthropoda
- Clade: Pancrustacea
- Class: Insecta
- Order: Hemiptera
- Suborder: Heteroptera
- Family: Reduviidae
- Tribe: Harpactorini
- Genus: Pselliopus
- Species: P. zebra

Binomial name
- Pselliopus zebra (Stål, 1862)

= Pselliopus zebra =

Species of true bug

Pselliopus zebra is a species of assassin bug in the family Reduviidae. It is found in Central America and North America.
