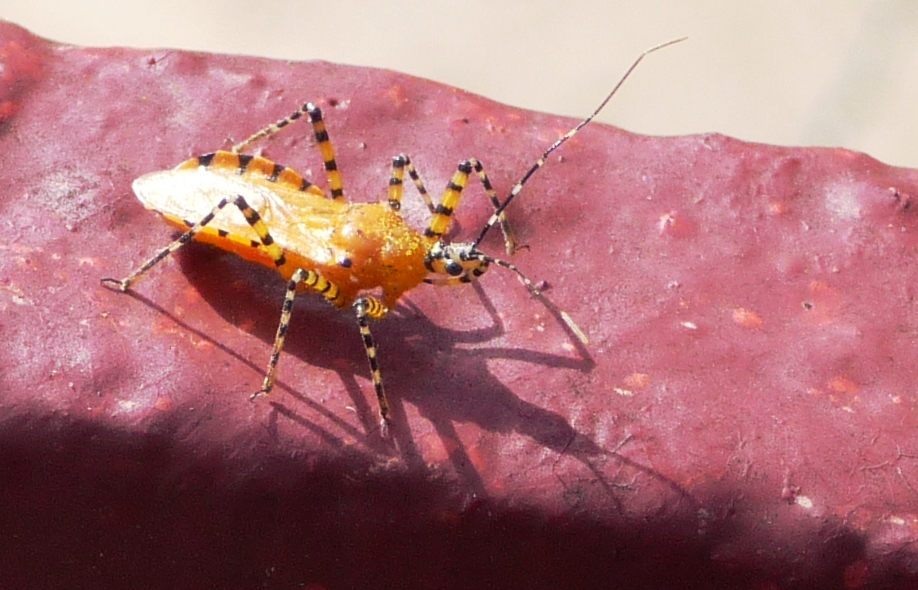
- Pselliopus barberi

Scientific classification
- Domain: Eukaryota
- Kingdom: Animalia
- Phylum: Arthropoda
- Class: Insecta
- Order: Hemiptera
- Suborder: Heteroptera
- Family: Reduviidae
- Tribe: Harpactorini
- Genus: Pselliopus; Bergroth, 1905

Species
- See Text

= Pselliopus =

Genus of true bugs

Pselliopus is a common genus of assassin bugs (Reduviidae), in the subfamily Harpactorinae. The genus is restricted to the New World, with 27 species described. Some species, such as Pselliopus barberi, are conspicuous because of their bright coloring and relatively large size. Some species of the genus are of interest as potential biological pest control agents.

== Species ==
- Pselliopus barberi Davis, 1912
- Pselliopus cinctus (Fabricius, 1776)
- Pselliopus cosmopolites Brailovsky, Mariño & Barrera, 2007
- Pselliopus dantei Brailovsky & Barrera, 2004
- Pselliopus flaviceps Brailovsky & Barrera, 2004
- Pselliopus inermis (Champion, 1899)
- Pselliopus infuscatus (Champion, 1899)
- Pselliopus ivanicus Brailovsky & Barrera, 2004
- Pselliopus karlenae Hussey, 1954
- Pselliopus latifasciatus Barber, 1924
- Pselliopus latispina Hussey, 1954
- Pselliopus limai Pinto, 1935
- Pselliopus lineaticeps (Champion, 1899)
- Pselliopus majesticus Brailovsky & Barrera, 2004
- Pselliopus marmorosus Brailovsky, Mariño & Barrera, 2007
- Pselliopus mexicanus (Champion, 1899)
- Pselliopus mirabilis Brailovsky, Mariño & Barrera, 2007
- Pselliopus nigropictus (Champion, 1899)
- Pselliopus ornaticeps (Stål, 1862)
- Pselliopus promeceops Brailovsky, Mariño & Barrera, 2007
- Pselliopus punctipes (Amyot & Serville, 1843)
- Pselliopus rayonensis Brailovsky, Mariño & Barrera, 2007
- Pselliopus rufofasciatus (Champion, 1899)
- Pselliopus spinicollis (Champion, 1899)
- Pselliopus tuberculatus (Champion, 1899)
- Pselliopus ventus Brailovsky & Barrera, 2004
- Pselliopus zebra (Stål, 1862)
