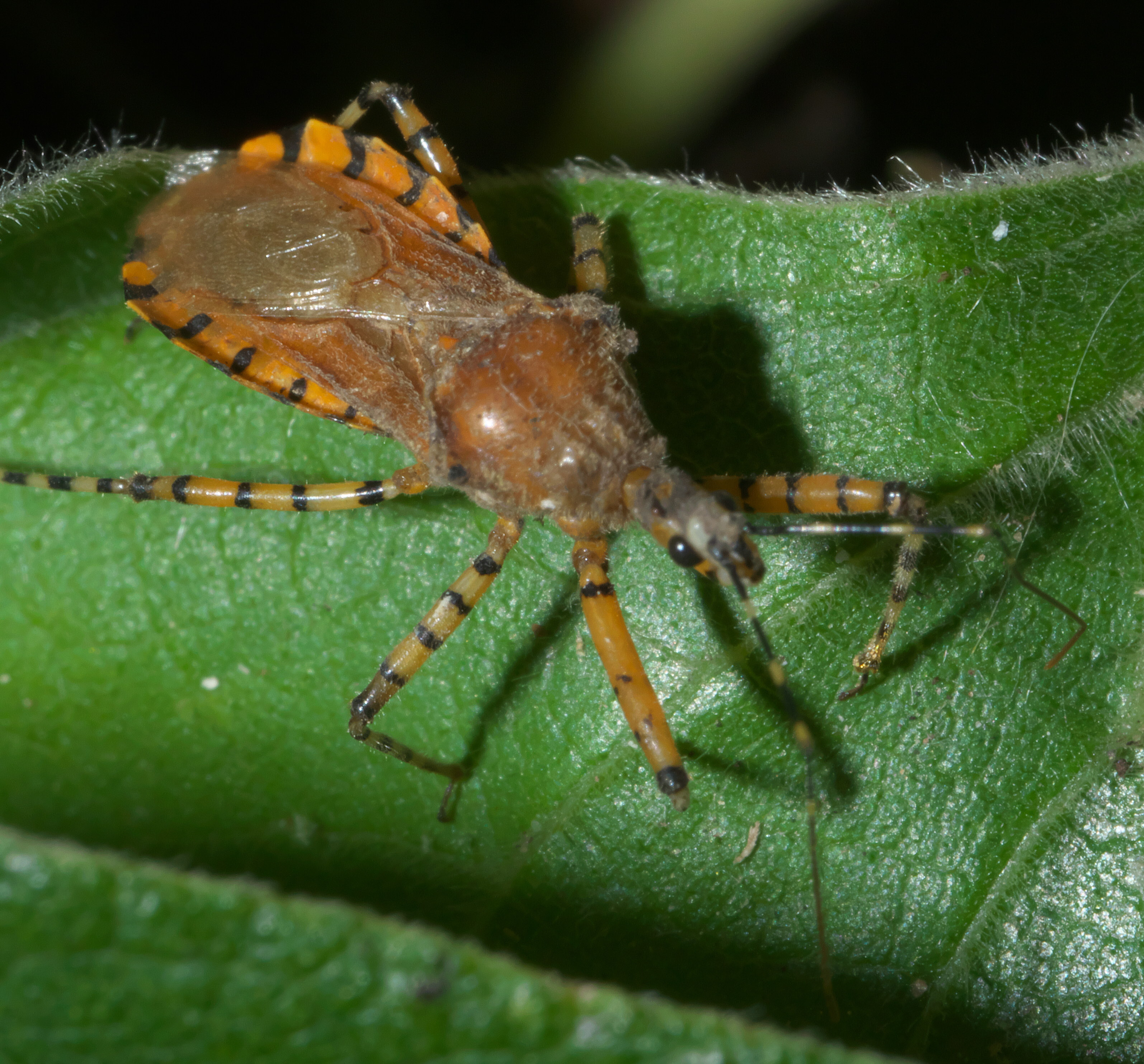

Scientific classification
- Domain: Eukaryota
- Kingdom: Animalia
- Phylum: Arthropoda
- Class: Insecta
- Order: Hemiptera
- Suborder: Heteroptera
- Family: Reduviidae
- Tribe: Harpactorini
- Genus: Pselliopus
- Species: P. barberi

Binomial name
- Pselliopus barberi Davis, 1912

= Pselliopus barberi =

Species of true bug

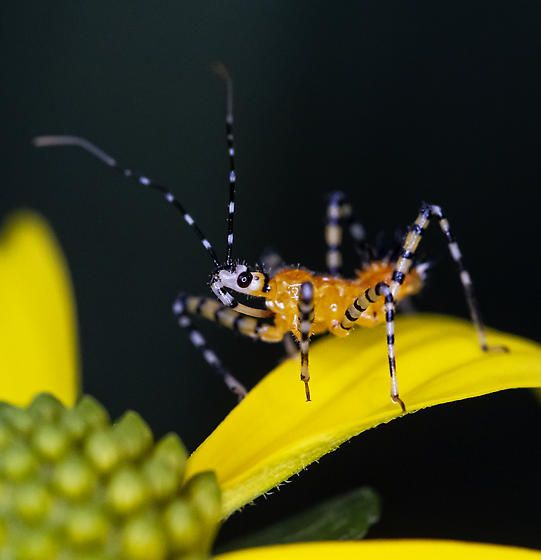
Pselliopus barberi nymph

Pselliopus barberi is a species of assassin bug in the family Reduviidae. It is found in North America.

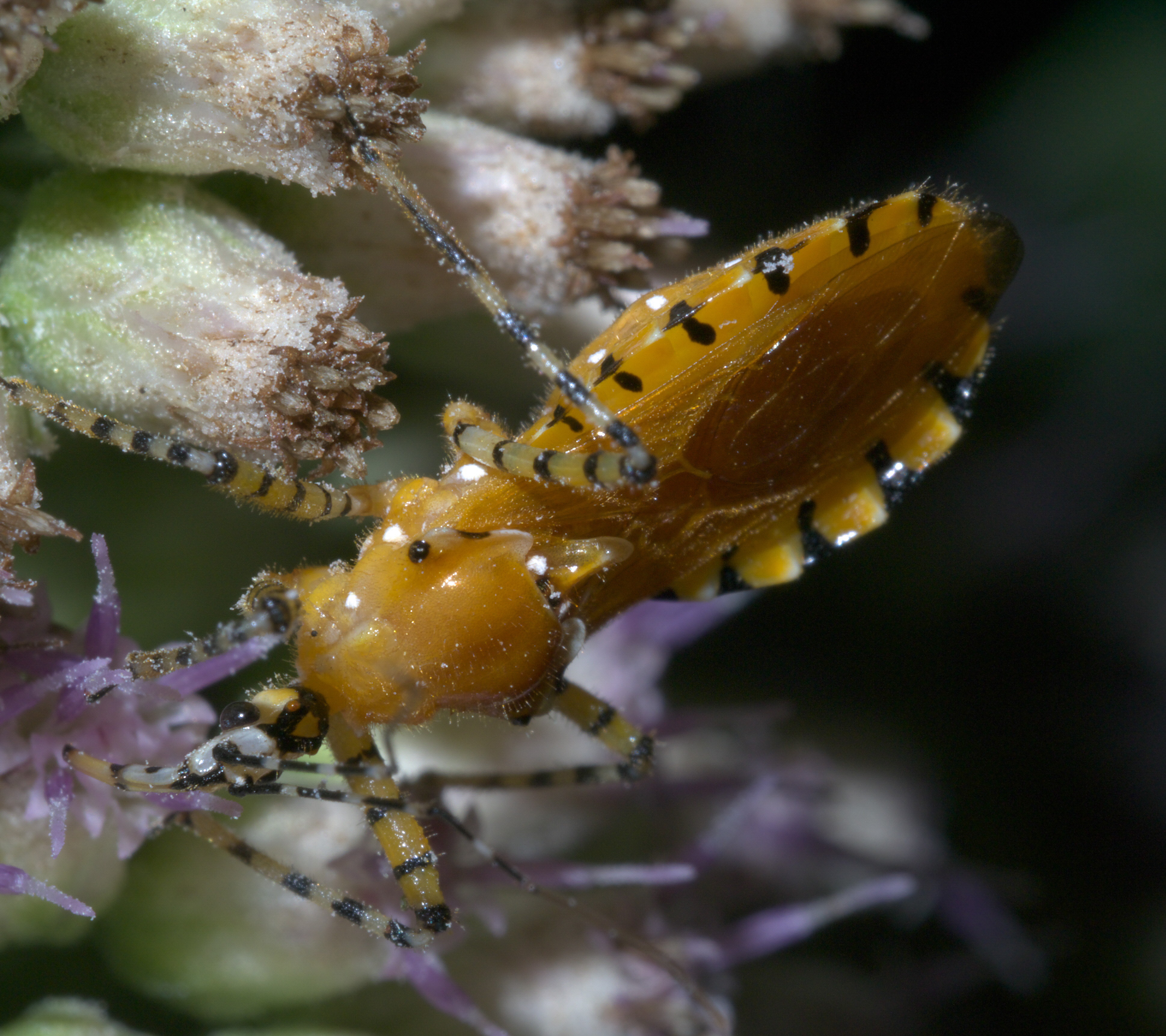

This species can be encountered from spring to autumn in open areas and are known to hibernate underneath tree bark, sometimes in groups.
