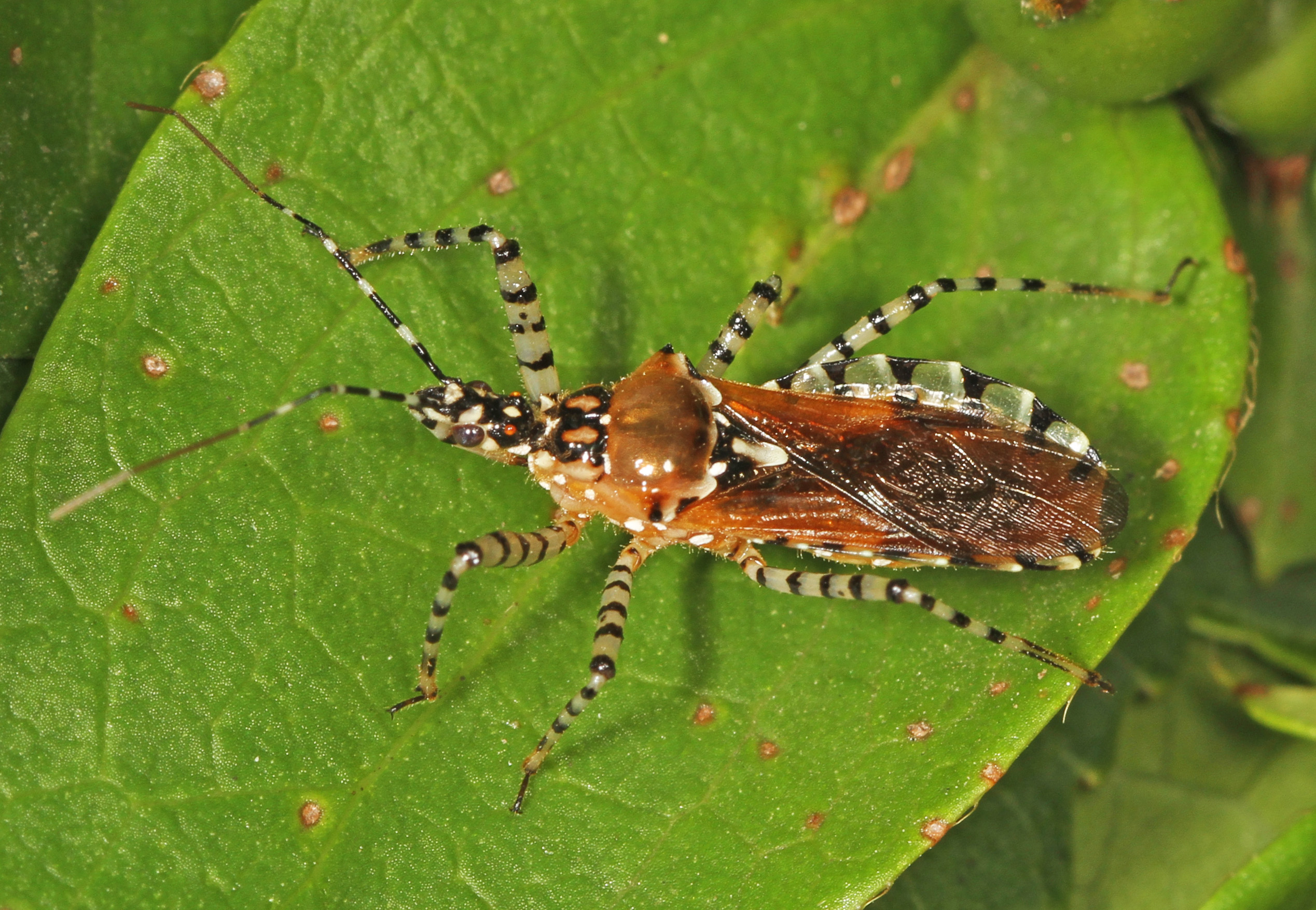

Scientific classification
- Kingdom: Animalia
- Phylum: Arthropoda
- Clade: Pancrustacea
- Class: Insecta
- Order: Hemiptera
- Suborder: Heteroptera
- Family: Reduviidae
- Genus: Pselliopus
- Species: P. cinctus

Binomial name
- Pselliopus cinctus (Fabricius, 1776)

= Pselliopus cinctus =

Species of true bug

Pselliopus cinctus is a species of assassin bug in the family Reduviidae. It is found in North America.

== Gallery ==
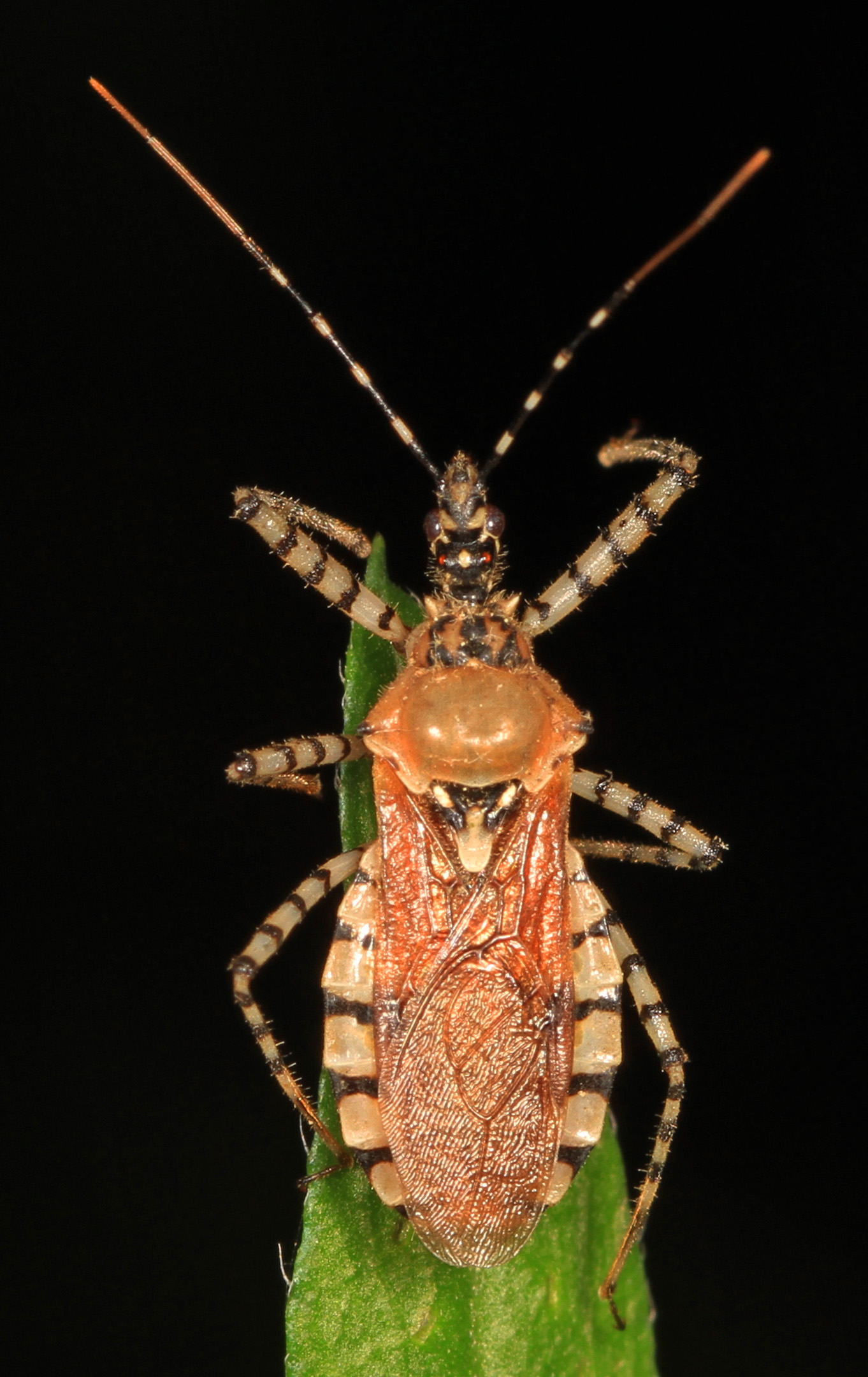

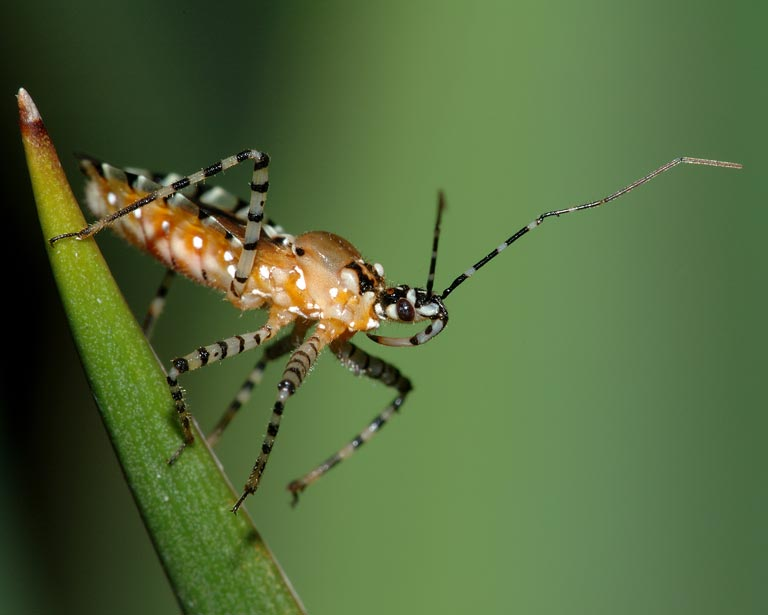

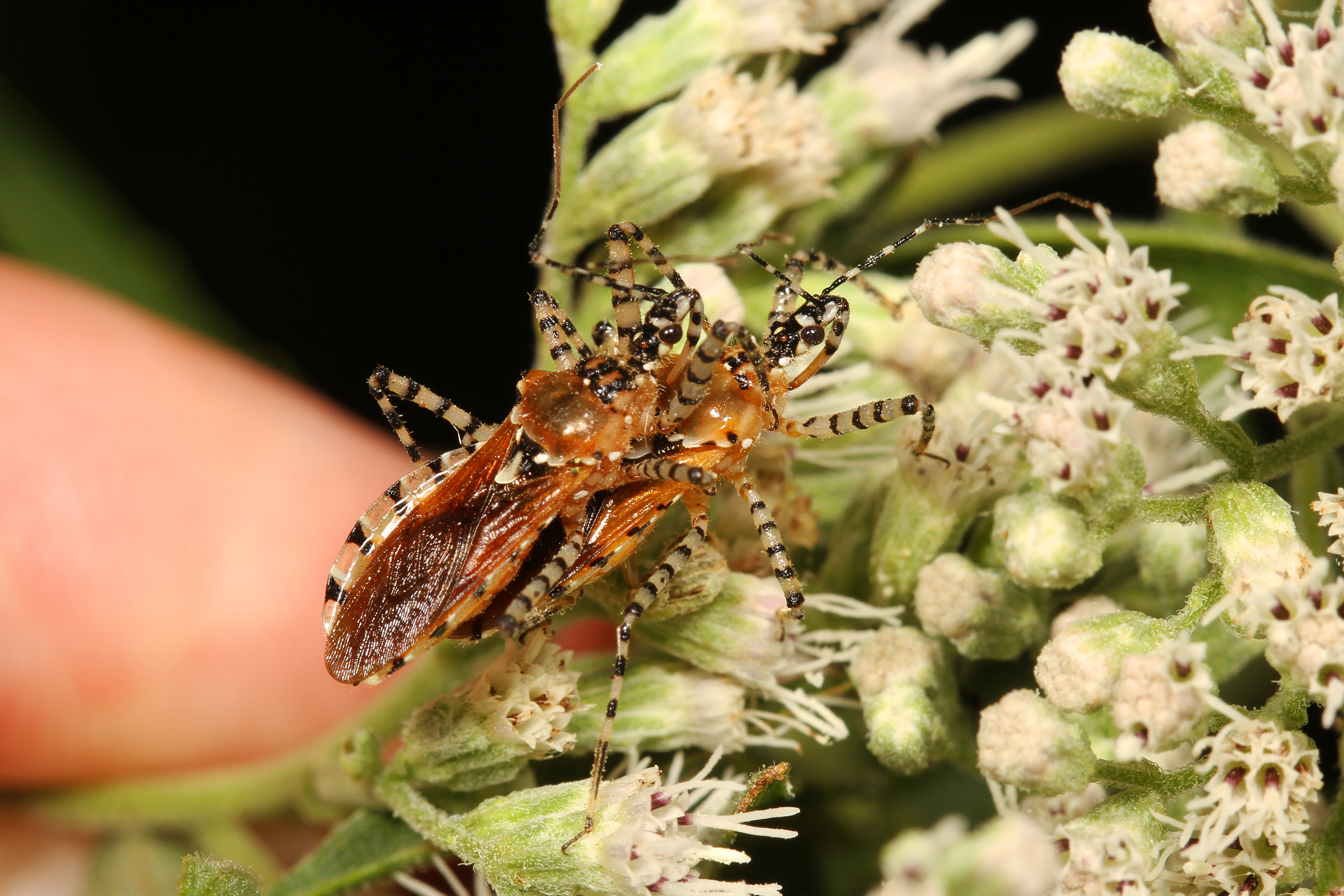

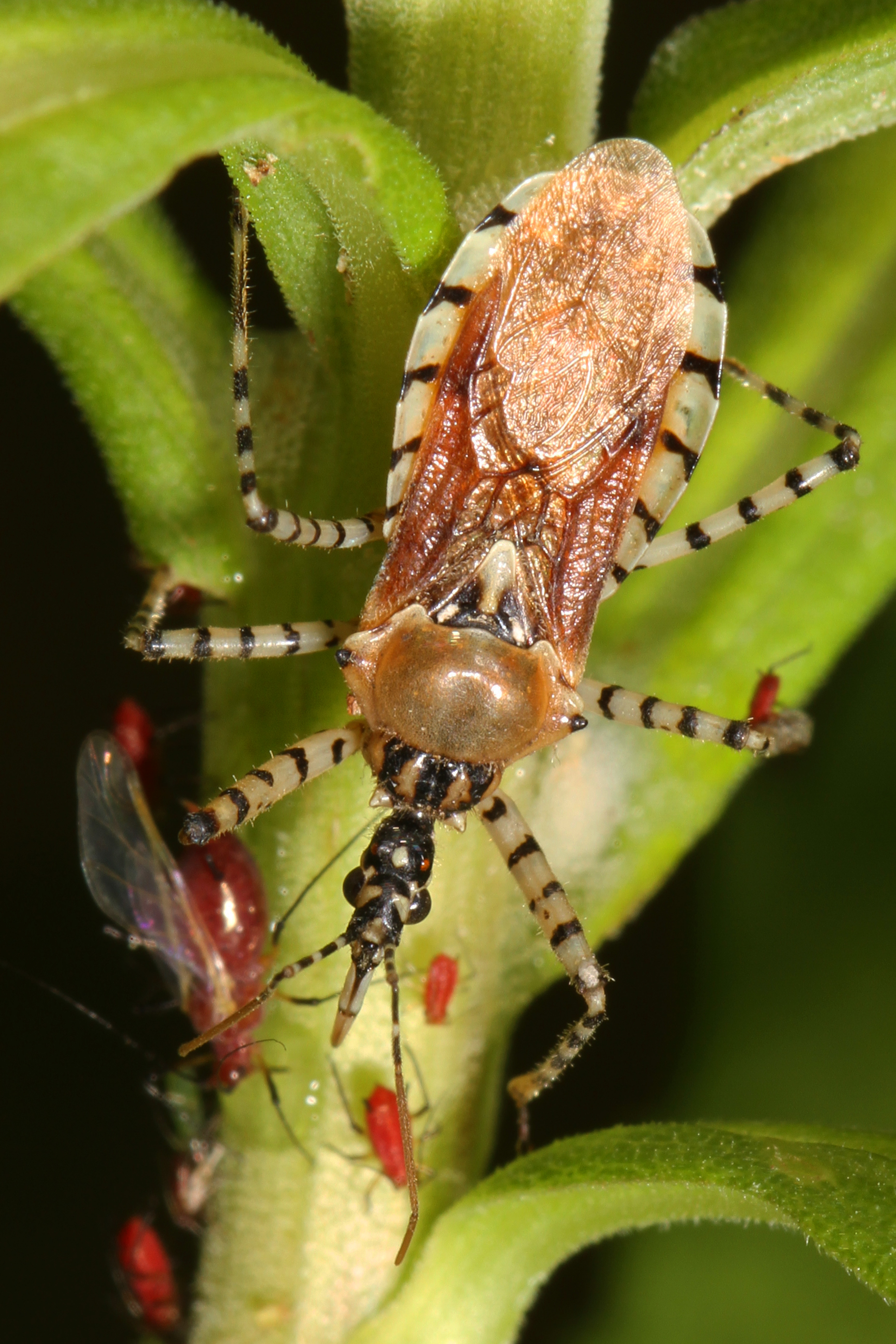

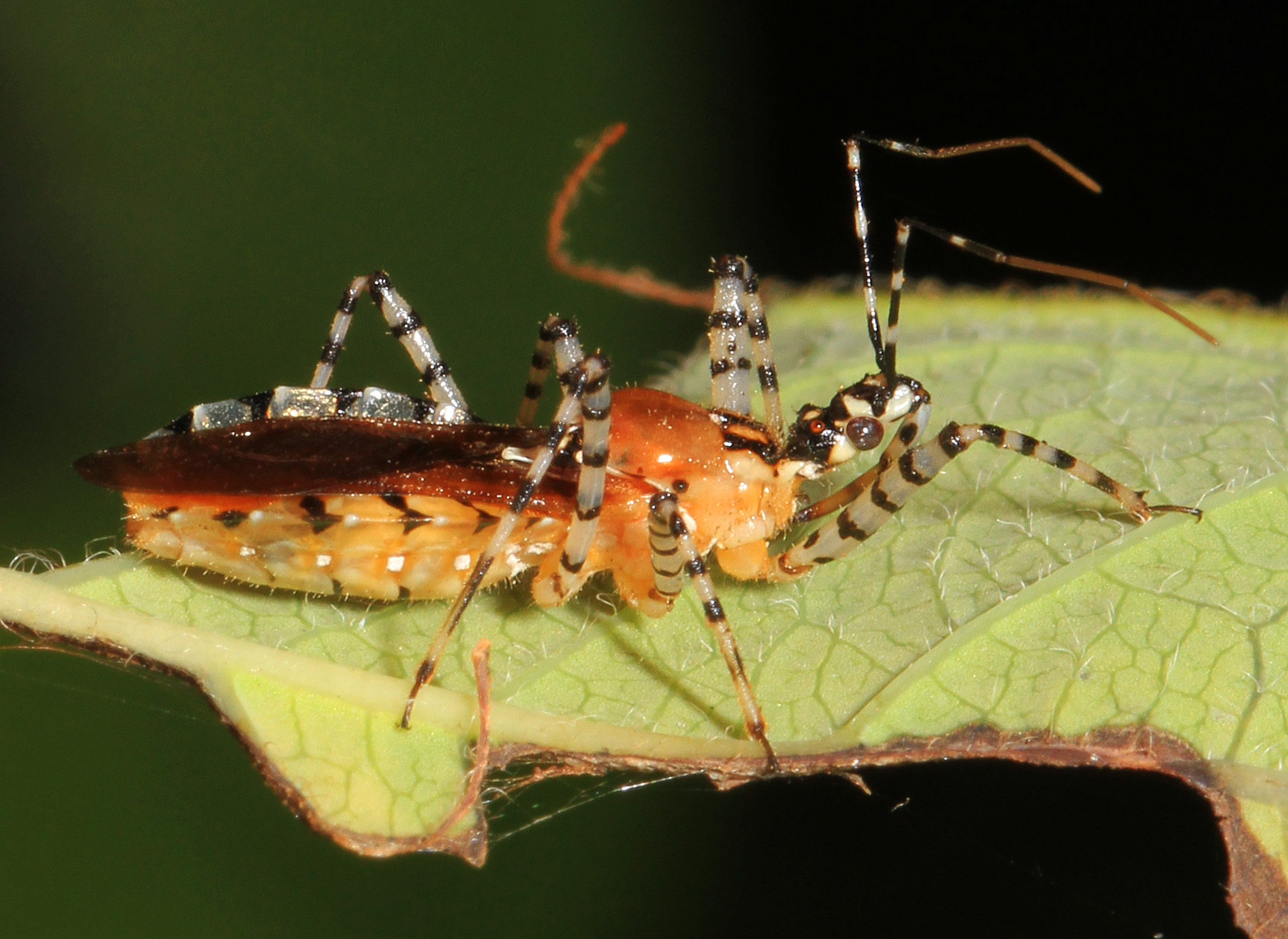
