= Benito River =

Coordinates: 1°31′17″N 9°55′03″E

Benito (Mbini)
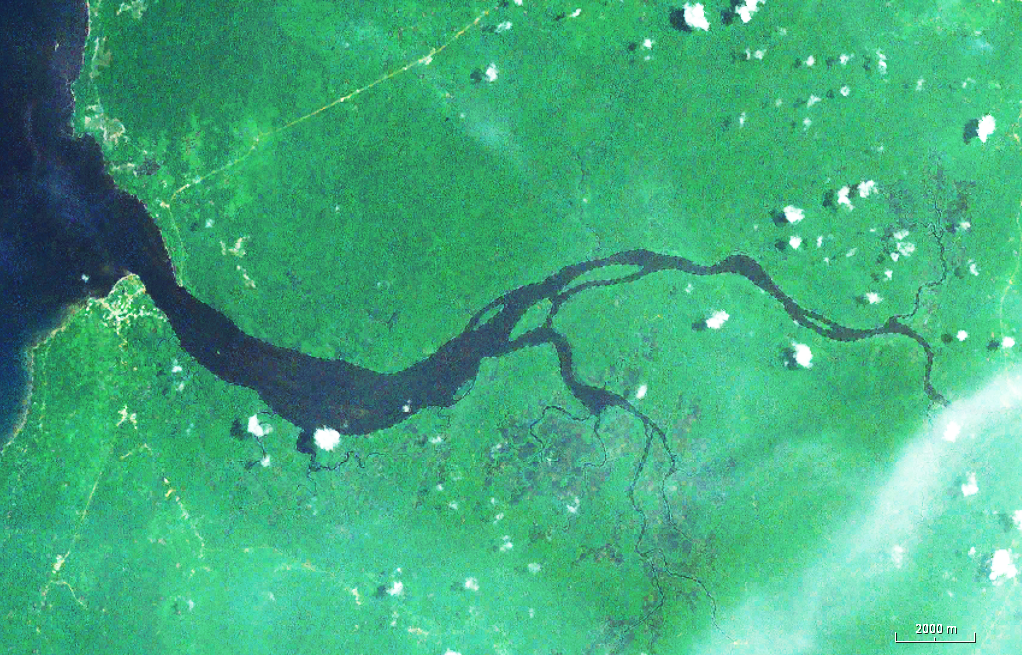

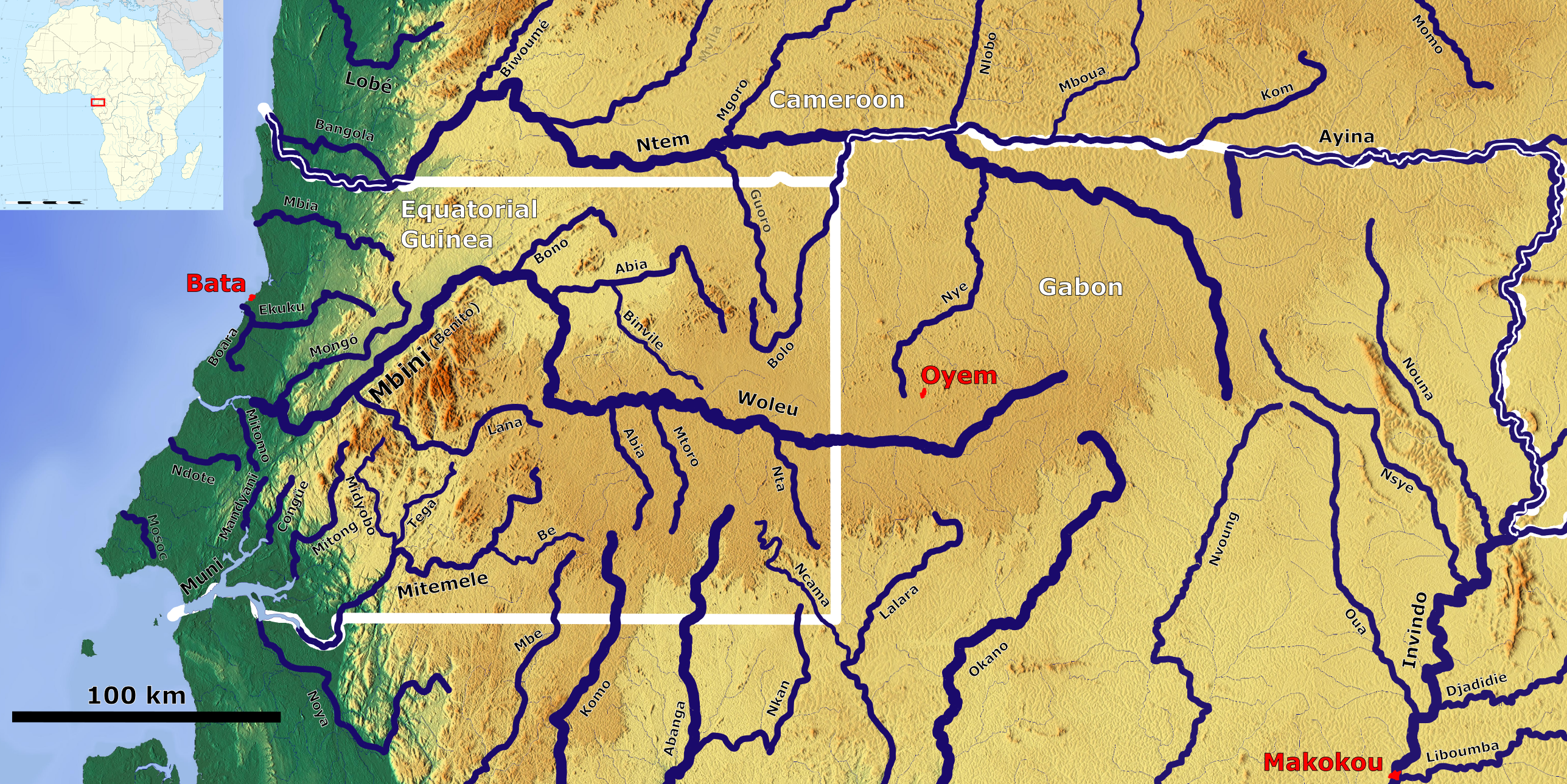

Location
- Countries: Equatorial Guinea and Gabon

Physical characteristics
- Mouth
  - location: Atlantic Ocean

The Benito is a river in Equatorial Guinea. It is known locally as the Mbini River, and, at least as it flows in its westerly part through the Monte Alén National Park, as the Uoro River. The river rises in Gabon and crosses into Equatorial Guinea where it divides the country roughly along the middle, running east to west. At the mouth to the Atlantic Ocean lies the town of Mbini, as well as large mangrove stands that extend 20 kilometres (12 mi) inland. Only this 20 kilometres (12 mi) portion of the river is navigable. The river is used to float logs for forestry operations. The cichlid genus Benitochromis takes the first part of its name from the Benito River.
