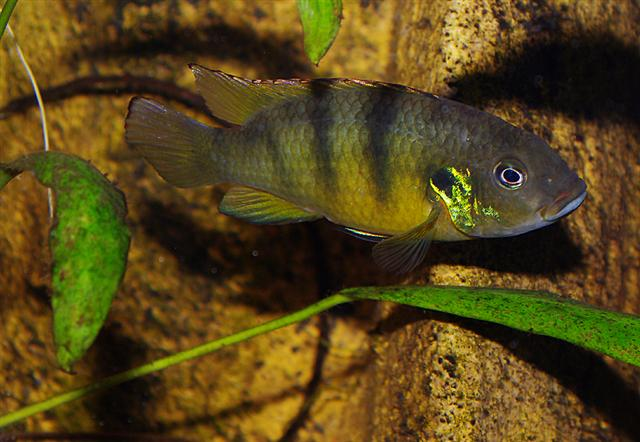
- Benitochromis ufermanni, female

Scientific classification
- Kingdom: Animalia
- Phylum: Chordata
- Class: Actinopterygii
- Order: Cichliformes
- Family: Cichlidae
- Tribe: Chromidotilapiini
- Genus: Benitochromis; Lamboj, 2001

Type species
- Chromidotilapia finleyi Trewavas, 1974

= Benitochromis =

Genus of fishes

Benitochromis is a small genus of cichlid fishes that are endemic to riverine and lake habitats in Middle Africa (Cameroon and Equatorial Guinea, including the island of Bioko). Several of these species were originally assigned to the genus Chromidotilapia. The name of this genus is derived from the type locality of the Benito River in Equatorial Guinea compounded with chromis, a word which originated with Aristotle and which may derive from the Greek word chroemo, meaning "to neigh" and which may have originally referred to the drums of the family Sciaenidae and which was expanded to include cichlids, damselfishes, dottybacks, and wrasses, groups of perch-like fish which were thought to be more closely related to each other than they are subsequent studies have apparently found them to be.

== Reproduction ==
Benitochromis nigrodorsalis ordinarily undergoes biparental reproduction, but is also capable of facultative (optional) self-fertilization (selfing). Facultative selfing likely occurs when a mating partner is unavailable.

== Species ==
There are currently six recognized species in this genus:

- Benitochromis batesii (Boulenger, 1901)
- Benitochromis conjunctus Lamboj, 2001
- Benitochromis finleyi (Trewavas, 1974)
- Benitochromis nigrodorsalis Lamboj, 2001
- Benitochromis riomuniensis (Thys van den Audenaerde, 1981)
- Benitochromis ufermanni Lamboj, 2001
