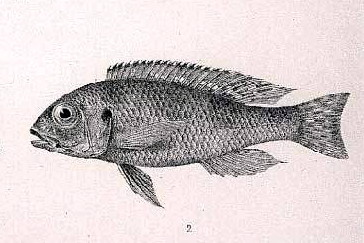

Conservation status
- Least Concern (IUCN 3.1)

Scientific classification
- Kingdom: Animalia
- Phylum: Chordata
- Class: Actinopterygii
- Division: Teleostei
- Order: Cichliformes
- Family: Cichlidae
- Genus: Limnochromis
- Species: L. auritus

Binomial name
- Limnochromis auritus (Boulenger, 1901)

Synonyms
- Paratilapia aurita Boulenger, 1901; Pelmatochromis auritus (Boulenger, 1901)

= Spangled cichlid =

Species of fish

The spangled cichlid (Limnochromis auritus) is a species of cichlid endemic to Lake Tanganyika where it is found in deep waters. It is the only species in the monotypic genus Limnochromis. This species can reach a length of 13 centimetres (5.1 in) TL. It can also be found in the aquarium trade.
