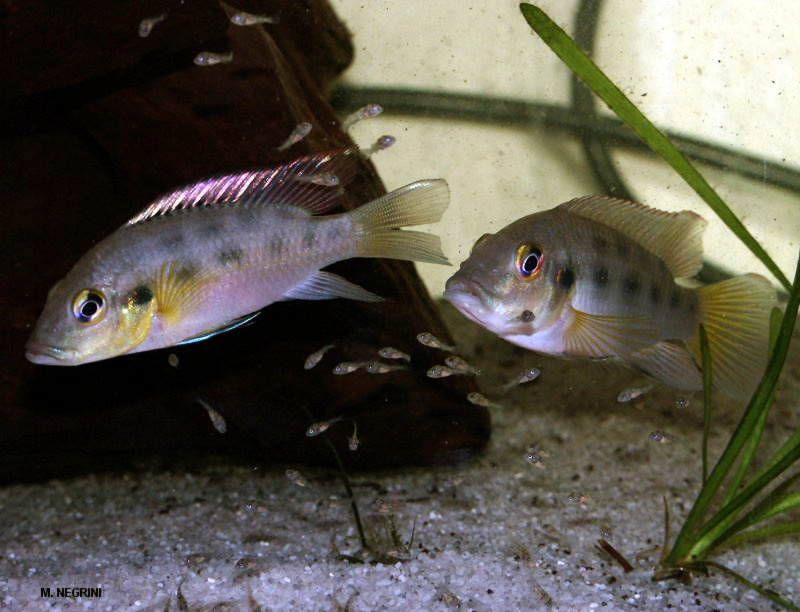
- C. guntheri pair with fry; female on left

Conservation status
- Least Concern (IUCN 3.1)

Scientific classification
- Kingdom: Animalia
- Phylum: Chordata
- Class: Actinopterygii
- Order: Cichliformes
- Family: Cichlidae
- Genus: Chromidotilapia
- Species: C. guntheri

Binomial name
- Chromidotilapia guntheri (Sauvage, 1882)

Synonyms
- Pelmatochromis belladorsalis Innes, 1935; Hemichromis guntheri Sauvage, 1882; Hemichromis voltae Steindachner, 1887; Hemichromis tersquamatus Günther, 1899; Pelmatochromis pellegrini Boulenger, 1903; Pelmatochromis boulengeri Lönnberg, 1903; Pelmatochromis loennbergi Trewavas, 1962; Chromidotilapia loennbergi (Trewavas, 1962); Chromidotilapia bosumtwensis Paulo, 1979

= Chromidotilapia guntheri =

Species of fish

Chromidotilapia guntheri, or Günther's mouthbrooder, is a cichlid from Africa. It was previously considered to consist of two subspecies, the common C. g. guntheri ranges from Liberia to Equatorial Guinea and Niger, and the critically endangered C. g. loennbergi which was thought to be restricted to Lake Barombi-ba-Kotto, a small crater lake in Cameroon but these subspecies are not supported by subsequent authorities. The species is noted for being a biparental mouthbrooder. Eggs are laid on a flat open surface and taken in the parents' mouth. Unlike many mouthbrooding cichlid species, both parents participate in the mouthbrooding.

Günther's mouthbrooder is restricted to lowland environments where it can be found in waters in coastal floodplains, savannahs and forests, showing a preference for slow or still waters with submerged tree roots and fallen branches to provide cover.

The species in the genus Chromidotilapia are bottom feeding omnivores and they feed on small invertebrates, algae, organic detritus, and other small food items. Their feeding behaviour is similar to that of some Neotropical cichlid genera such as Geophagus and Satanoperca in that they take up mouthfuls of the substrate which they sift for edible items before expelling the waste through their gills and the mouth.

Chromidotilapia guntheri are sexually dimorphic and the males and females differ in size with the males being larger than the females, males growing to 20 centimetres (7.9 in) and females to 13 centimetres (5.1 in). Other sexual differences are that first ray in the pectoral fin in males is more extended when compared to those of females. The female is more colorful than the male. Both sexes are a generally tan color, but the female has a pink belly and a metallic white stripe on the dorsal fin.

The common name and the specific name both honour the German-born British zoologist, ichthyologist, and herpetologist Albert Günther (1830-1914) of the British Museum (Natural History).
