= Pallidochromis tokolosh =

Conservation status
- Least Concern (IUCN 3.1)

Scientific classification
- Kingdom: Animalia
- Phylum: Chordata
- Class: Actinopterygii
- Order: Cichliformes
- Family: Cichlidae
- Genus: Pallidochromis
- Species: P. tokolosh

Binomial name
- Pallidochromis tokolosh G. F. Turner, 1994

Species of fish

Pallidochromis tokolosh is species of cichlid endemic to Lake Malawi where it is only known from deep waters (50 to 150 metres (160 to 490 ft)). This species is piscivorous and can reach a length of 28 centimetres (11 in) SL. It is the only known member of its genus. The specific name refers to the tokoloshe, the name of an evil water spirit in many central African languages, and is an allusion to the bulging eyes, long snout and pot belly of this species when trawled from the great depths and which has inspired many carvings which are sold around the Lake.
