= Interochromis =

Conservation status
- Least Concern (IUCN 3.1)

Scientific classification
- Kingdom: Animalia
- Phylum: Chordata
- Class: Actinopterygii
- Order: Cichliformes
- Family: Cichlidae
- Genus: Interochromis; Yamaoka, M. Hori & Kuwamura, 1988
- Species: I. loocki

Binomial name
- Interochromis loocki (Poll, 1949)

Synonyms
- Simochromis loocki Poll

Species of fish

Interochromis is a genus of cichlids endemic to Lake Tanganyika in East Africa. It is a monotypic genus, being represented by the single species, Interochromis loocki.

Interochromis loocki is a widespread but rare species living on rocky substrates in 2–3 m (7–10 ft) of water. This species can reach a length of 10.5 centimetres (4.1 in) total length (TL).
