= Tangachromis dhanisi =

Conservation status
- Least Concern (IUCN 3.1)

Scientific classification
- Kingdom: Animalia
- Phylum: Chordata
- Class: Actinopterygii
- Order: Cichliformes
- Family: Cichlidae
- Genus: Tangachromis; Poll, 1981
- Species: T. dhanisi

Binomial name
- Tangachromis dhanisi (Poll, 1949)

Synonyms
- Limnochromis dhanisi Poll, 1949

Species of fish

Tangachromis dhanisi is a species of cichlid endemic to Lake Tanganyika where they live in deep waters having been caught at depths of 100 metres (330 ft). They prey on copepods. This species reaches a length of 8.5 centimetres (3.3 in) TL. They can also be found in the aquarium trade.
