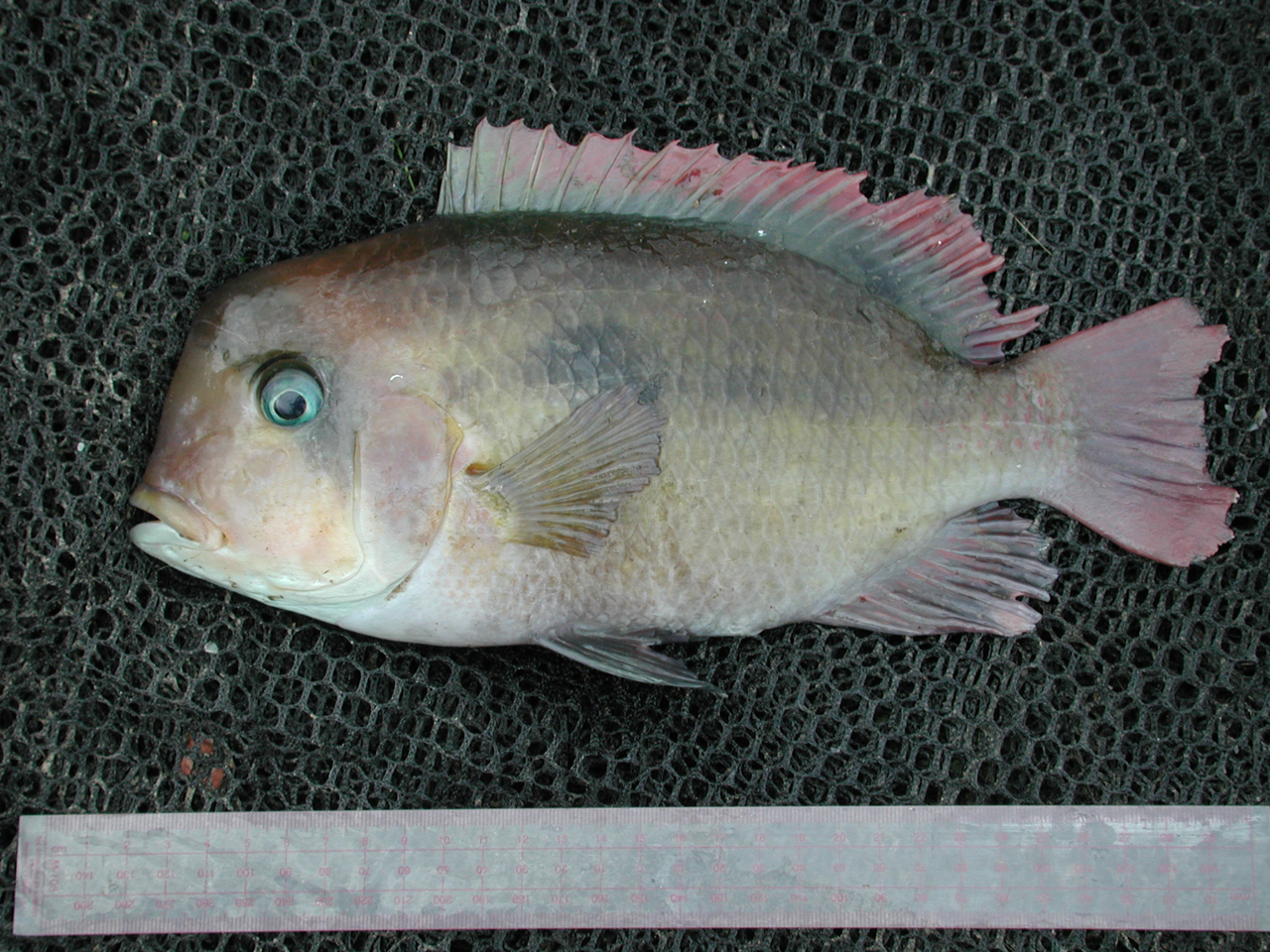

Conservation status
- Least Concern (IUCN 3.1)

Scientific classification
- Kingdom: Animalia
- Phylum: Chordata
- Class: Actinopterygii
- Order: Cichliformes
- Family: Cichlidae
- Subfamily: Heterochromidinae; Kullander, 1998
- Genus: Heterochromis; Regan, 1922
- Species: H. multidens

Binomial name
- Heterochromis multidens (Pellegrin, 1900)

= Heterochromis =

Genus of fishes

Heterochromis is a genus of cichlid fish in the order Perciformes. It is the only genus of the subfamily Heterochromidinae, and contains a single species, Heterochromis multidens, which is endemic to the Congo River Basin in Central Africa. The relationships of Heterochromis to other cichlids have long been controversial, with several morphological features suggesting that it is more closely related to American cichlids than to other African species. Molecular studies have given contradictory results. The most comprehensive analysis done to date found more support for relationship to African cichlids, but could not conclusively reject a relationship to the American clade.

It can reach a total length of 29.5 cm (11.6 in). This species is probably a substrate spawner and in older males a hump may develop on the head.
