= Cyathochromis =

Conservation status
- Least Concern (IUCN 3.1)

Scientific classification
- Kingdom: Animalia
- Phylum: Chordata
- Class: Actinopterygii
- Order: Cichliformes
- Family: Cichlidae
- Genus: Cyathochromis
- Species: C. obliquidens

Binomial name
- Cyathochromis obliquidens Trewavas, 1935

Species of fish

Cyathochromis obliquidens is a species of cichlid endemic to Lake Malawi in east Africa where it is found in shallow, vegetated waters from 1 to 6 metres (3.3 to 19.7 ft) depth. It is an algae grazer, mainly from the leaves of aquatic vegetation. This species grows to a length of 15 centimetres (5.9 in) TL. It is also found in the aquarium trade. It currently is the only known member of its genus.
