= Genyochromis =

Conservation status
- Least Concern (IUCN 3.1)

Scientific classification
- Kingdom: Animalia
- Phylum: Chordata
- Class: Actinopterygii
- Order: Cichliformes
- Family: Cichlidae
- Subfamily: Pseudocrenilabrinae
- Tribe: Haplochromini
- Genus: Genyochromis; Trewavas, 1935
- Species: G. mento

Binomial name
- Genyochromis mento Trewavas, 1935

Species of fish

Genyochromis mento is a species of haplochromine cichlid endemic to Lake Malawi in East Africa. It is also found in the aquarium trade. It is well known for biting the fins of other fish and is a scale-eater. It reaches a length of 12.6 centimetres (5.0 in) TL. It is currently the only known member of its genus.
