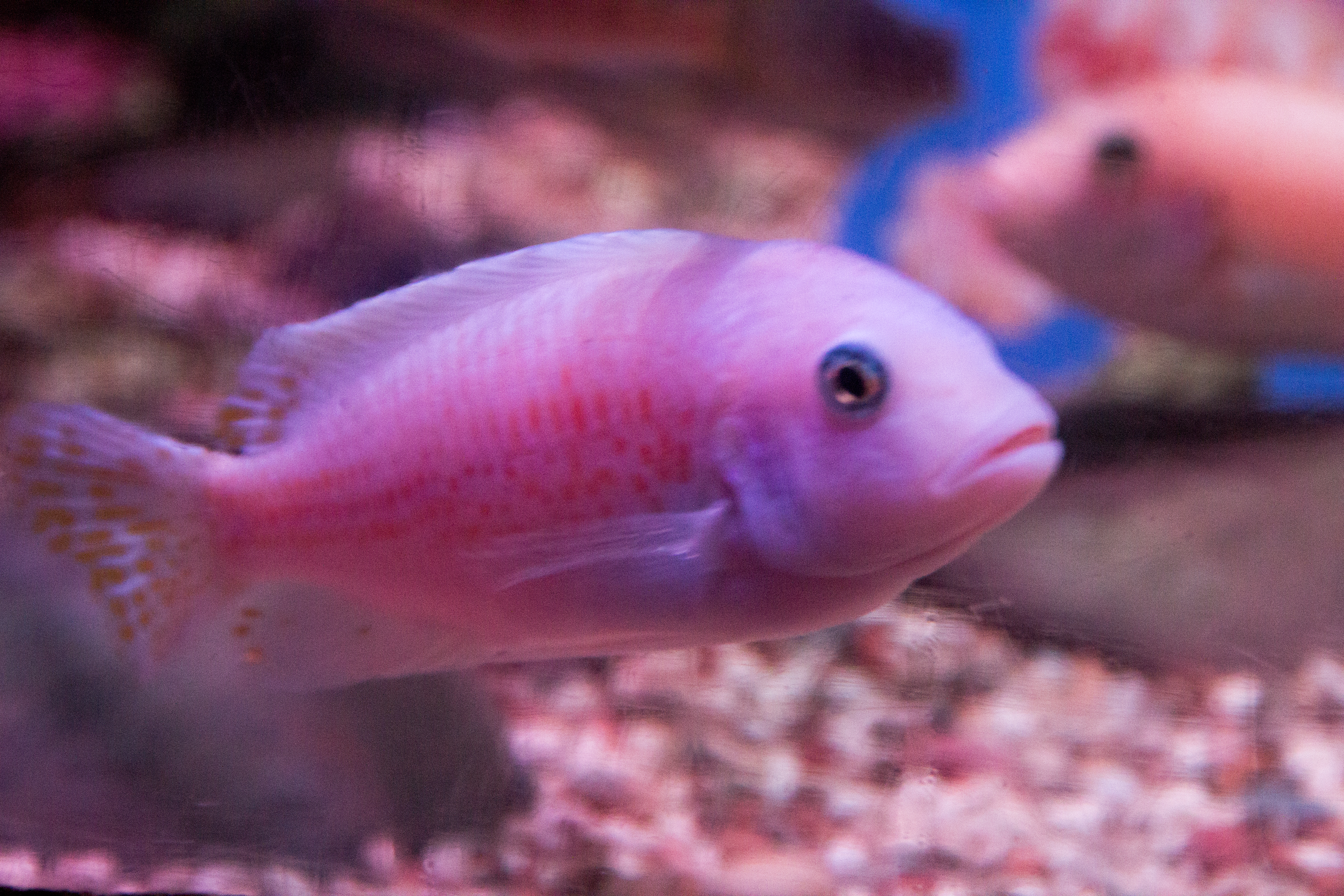
- A mbuna

Scientific classification
- Kingdom: Animalia
- Phylum: Chordata
- Class: Actinopterygii
- Division: Teleostei
- Clade: Percomorpha
- Clade: Ovalentaria
- Order: Cichliformes
- Family: Cichlidae; Bonaparte, 1835

Type genus
- Cichla Bloch & Schneider, 1801

Subfamilies and Tribes
- Current taxonomy: Cichlinae; Etroplinae; Pseudocrenilabrinae; Ptychochrominae; Alternate taxonomy: Cichlinae; Astronotini; Chaetobranchini; Cichlasomatini; Cichlini; Geophagini; Heroini; Retroculini; Etroplinae; Bathybatini; Benthochromini; Boulengerochromini; Chromidotilapiini; Coelotilapiini; Coptodonini; Cyprichromini; Cyphotilapiini; Ectodini; Eretmodini; Etiini; Etroplini; Gobiocichlini; Greenwoodochromini; Haplochromini; Hemichromini; Heterochromidini; Heterotilapiini; Lamprologini; Limnochromini; Oreochromini; Pelmatochromini; Pelmatolapiini; Perissodini; Ptychochromini; Steatocranini; Tilapiini; Tropheini; Tylochromini; For genera, see below.

= Cichlid =

Cichlid Temporal range: 48.6–0 Ma Early Eocene – present

Family of fishes

Cichlids (/ˈsɪklɪdz/) (Note: Cichlid is frequently mispronounced in the pet trade as if spelled "chicklid" /ˈtʃɪklɪd/, presumably from confusion with names like Chiclets, and with Italian words like cioppino and ciao that start with ci- and the sound /tʃ/.) are a large, diverse, and widespread family of percomorph fish in the family Cichlidae, order Cichliformes. At least 1,760 species have been scientifically described, making it one of the largest vertebrate families, with only the Cyprinidae being more speciose. New species are discovered annually, and many species remain undescribed. The actual number of species is therefore unknown, with estimates varying between 2,000 and 3,000. They are native to the Neotropics, Africa (including Madagascar), the Middle East, and the Indian subcontinent, although some species have been introduced worldwide.

Many cichlids, particularly tilapia, are important food fishes, while others, such as the Cichla species, are valued game fish. The family also includes many popular freshwater aquarium fish kept by hobbyists, including the angelfish, oscars, and discus. Cichlids have the largest number of endangered species among vertebrate families, most in the haplochromine group. Cichlids are well known for their rapid evolution into morphologically diverse species flocks within the African Great Lakes. Some of these key morphological differences include jaw and teeth structure, fin, head, and body shape, and most importantly, their coloration. Their diversity in the African Great Lakes is important for the study of speciation in evolution. Many cichlids introduced into waters outside of their natural range have become nuisances.

All cichlids practice some form of parental care for their eggs and fry, usually in the form of guarding the eggs and fry or mouthbrooding.

== History ==
One of the reasons of rapid speciation in the African Great Lakes, Victoria, Malawi, and Tanganyika, is their geological and climate history. Tectonic rifting that occurred ~20–25 million years ago created the rift system, eventually forming the basins of the three lakes. Lake Tanganyika, the oldest, formed ~12–9 million years ago, while Lake Malawi deepened more recently during the Pliocene (~5–2 Ma). Sediment core analysis from 1.3 million years ago shows lake-level fluctuations, with at least 24 drops of 200m and 14 drops of 400m in Lake Malawi; these patterns are also seen in the other two lakes.

These patterns of lowstands reduced available habitats and geographically isolated fish populations; highstands refilled the lake, increased habitat availability, and reconnected populations, allowing hybridization and gene flow within the different fish populations.

== Anatomy and appearance ==
Cichlids span a wide range of body sizes, from species as small as 2.5 cm (1 in) in length (e.g., female Neolamprologus multifasciatus) to much larger species approaching 1 m (3 ft) in length (Boulengerochromis and Cichla). As a group, cichlids exhibit a similar diversity of body shapes, ranging from strongly laterally compressed species (such as Altolamprologus, Pterophyllum, and Symphysodon) to species that are cylindrical and highly elongated (such as Julidochromis, Teleogramma, Teleocichla, Crenicichla, and Gobiocichla). Generally, however, cichlids tend to be of medium size, ovate in shape, and slightly laterally compressed, and generally similar to the North American sunfishes in morphology, behavior, and ecology.

Cichlids share a single key trait - the fusion of the lower pharyngeal bones into a single tooth-bearing structure. A complex set of muscles allows the upper and lower pharyngeal bones to be used as a second set of jaws for processing food, allowing a division of labor between the "true jaws" (mandibles) and the "pharyngeal jaws". Cichlids are efficient and often highly specialized feeders that capture and process a very wide variety of food items. This is assumed to be one reason why they are so diverse.

== Taxonomy ==
=== Internal taxonomy ===
The following consensus taxonomy is based on the Catalog of Fishes (2025)

- Family Cichlidae Bonaparte, 1835
  - Subfamily Etroplinae Kullander, 1998 (Indian and Madagascan cichlids)
  - Subfamily Ptychochrominae Sparks, 2004 (Malagasy cichlids)
  - Subfamily Pseudocrenilabrinae Fowler, 1934 (African cichlids)
  - Subfamily Cichlinae Bonaparte, 1835 (American cichlids)

In the past, cichlid taxonomy has varied depending on the author. Kullander (1998) recognized eight subfamilies of cichlids: the Astronotinae, Cichlasomatinae, Cichlinae, Etroplinae, Geophaginae, Heterochromidinae, Pseudocrenilabrinae, and Retroculinae. A ninth subfamily, the Ptychochrominae, was later recognized by Sparks and Smith. Cichlid taxonomy is still debated, and classification of genera cannot yet be definitively given. A comprehensive system of assigning species to monophyletic genera is still lacking, and there is not complete agreement on what genera should be recognized in this family.

As an example of the classification problems, Kullander placed the African genus Heterochromis phylogenetically within Neotropical cichlids, although later papers concluded otherwise. Other problems center upon the identity of the putative common ancestor for the Lake Victoria superflock (many closely related species sharing a single habitat), and the ancestral lineages of Lake Tanganyikan cichlids.

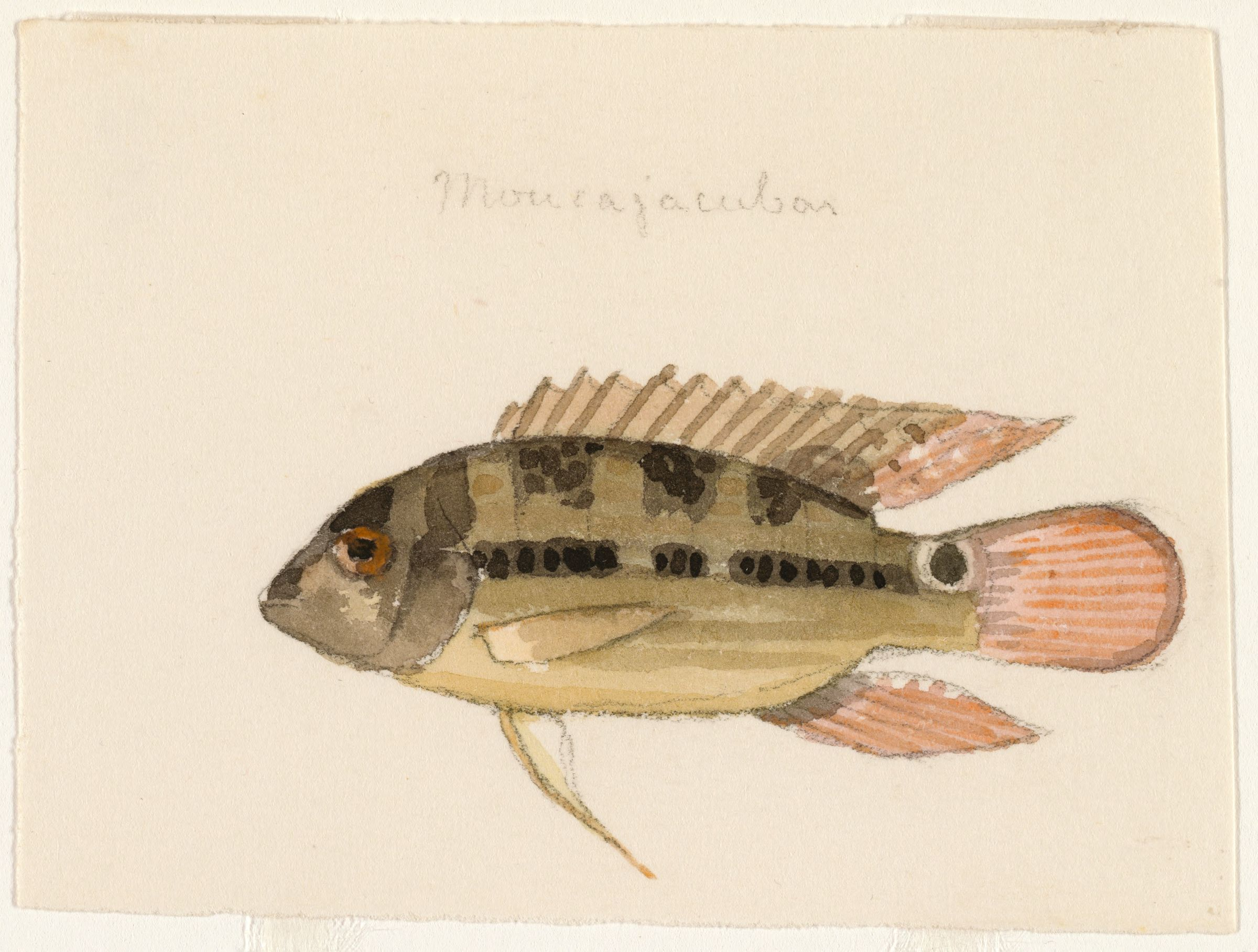
A 19th-century watercolor painting of a pale flag cichlid by Jacques Burkhardt

Phylogeny derived from morphological characters shows differences at the genus level with phylogeny based on genetic loci. A consensus remains that the Cichlidae as a family are monophyletic.

In cichlid taxonomy, dentition was formerly used as a classifying characteristic, but this was complicated because in many cichlids, tooth shapes change with age, due to wear, and cannot be relied upon. Genome sequencing and other technologies transformed cichlid taxonomy.

Alternatively, all cichlid species native to the New World, can be classified under the subfamily Cichlinae, while Etroplinae can classify all cichlid species native to the Old World.

=== External taxonomy ===
The taxonomic placement of cichlids has long been disputed and variable, and has only recently been largely resolved. In the past, based on morphological characteristics, cichlids were classed in a suborder, the Labroidei, along with the wrasses (Labridae), in the order Perciformes. However, studies incorporating molecular phylogenetics have contradicted this grouping.

More recent phylogenetic studies support the creation of a distinct order, the Cichliformes, to contain the cichlids and their close relatives, which are no longer thought to be closely related to wrasses. The closest living relative of cichlids has been found to be the marine convict blenny, and both families are classified in the 5th edition of Fishes of the World as the two families in the Cichliformes, part of the subseries Ovalentaria. The Catalog of Fishes adopts the same placement, although the leaffishes (which have a similar African and South American distribution) are now also placed in the Cichliformes. Although these interrelationships are now generally well-supported, other authors have interpreted these relationships in differing ways, such as instead placing the cichlids, leaffish, and convict blenny as the most basal members of an expanded Blenniiformes.

=== Evolution ===
Modern cichlids have a disjunct distribution consisting of Africa (including Madagascar), the Neotropics (including Cuba and Hispaniola), the Levant, southern Iran, and the southern Indian subcontinent. This distribution has become the subject of much scientific dispute, with it being debated whether modern cichlid distribution is a consequence of the breakup of Gondwana (which would make cichlids a particularly ancient group dating to the Early Cretaceous), or if it is instead based on more recent oceanic dispersal by the cichlids (despite modern members of the group being largely restricted to freshwater).

Proponents of the Gondwanan theory, which saw more support in the past, have noted that the cichlids display the precise sister relationships predicted by Gondwanan distribution: Africa-South America and India-Madagascar, and that with the exception of the species from Cuba, Hispaniola and Madagascar, cichlids have not reached any oceanic island. The dispersal hypothesis, in contrast, requires cichlids to have negotiated thousands of kilometers of open ocean between India and Madagascar without colonizing any other island, or for that matter, crossing the Mozambique Channel to Africa.

However, more recent studies incorporating phylogenetic evidence have found that the divergences within the cichlids are far too young for cichlids to have even been present for the breakup of Gondwana. Molecular clock estimates have placed the family's origin only to the Late Cretaceous period, and the divergences within the family to have occurred anywhere between the Late Cretaceous to the Eocene (depending on the study). This suggests that only dispersal can support modern cichlid distribution. However, the factors that may have allowed prehistoric cichlids to make migrations over entire oceans remains a mystery. It is known that during the Paleogene, the Atlantic Ocean between South America and Africa was significantly narrower, and it has been suggested that either now-submerged islands or a large plume from the Congo River may have allowed for a shallower or less saline environment that was conducive for cichlids to disperse from Africa to South America. Under the dispersal hypothesis, it is generally accepted that Africa was the ancestral home for cichlids, from which they dispersed to attain their present distribution.

=== Fossil record ===
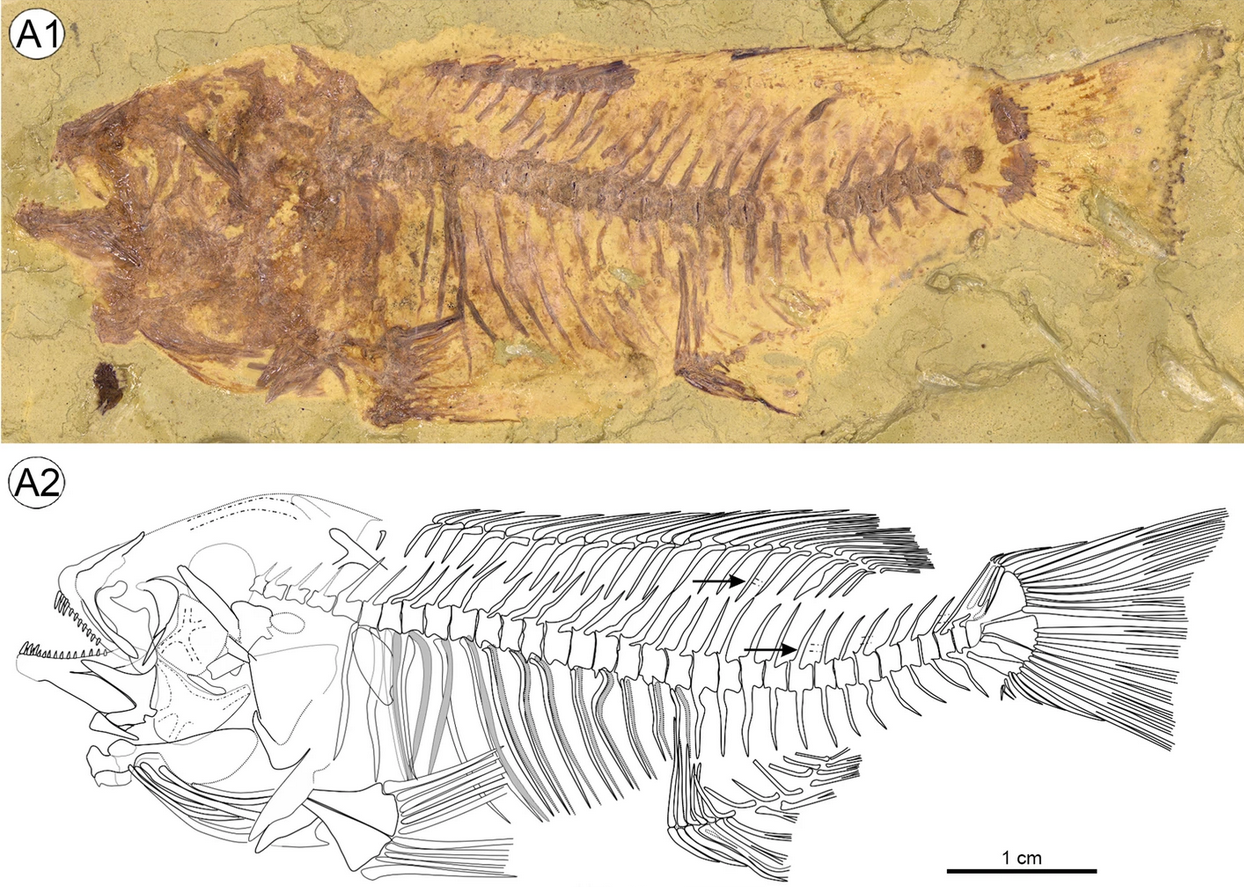
Warilochromis, a fossil cichlid from the Miocene of Kenya

The fossil record of cichlids is comprehensive, although it only starts in the Eocene, well after the family is thought to have undergone significant evolutionary diversification. Fossil cichlids appear in both South America and Africa at roughly the same time in the Eocene, with fossil cichlids known from the Early Eocene (48.6 mya)-aged Lumbrera Formation of Argentina, as well as the Middle Eocene (46 mya)–aged Mahenge Formation of Tanzania, suggesting that the divergence between Old and New World cichlids must have occurred prior to this point.

Several African fossil sites that contain cichlids (including the Eocene-aged Mahenge Formation of Tanzania and the Miocene-aged Ngorora Formation of Kenya) appear to represent former maars or rift lakes, and the fossil cichlids present in them appear to represent species flocks akin to those in the modern African rift lakes. This suggests that rapid diversification within enclosed ecosystems is a longstanding trait of cichlids.

Fossil remains also suggest that cichlids ranged further north in the geologic past, with the extinct tilapia Oreochromis lorenzoi being known from the Late Miocene of Italy.

== Distribution and habitat ==
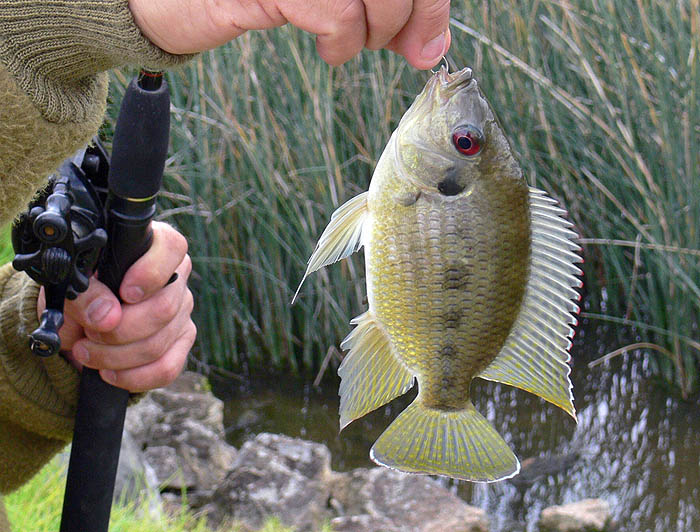
Pelmatolapia mariae, caught on a hook and line, in Australia: Originally from Africa, the species established feral populations in Australia.

Cichlids are one of the largest vertebrate families in the world. They are most diverse in Africa and South America. Africa alone is host to at least an estimated 1,600 species. Central America and Mexico have about 120 species, as far north as the Rio Grande in South Texas. Madagascar has its own distinctive species (Katria, Oxylapia, Paratilapia, Paretroplus, Ptychochromis, and Ptychochromoides), only distantly related to those on the African mainland. Native cichlids are largely absent in Asia, except for 9 species in Israel, Lebanon, and Syria (Astatotilapia flaviijosephi, Oreochromis aureus, O. niloticus, Sarotherodon galilaeus, Coptodon zillii, and Tristramella spp.), two in Iran (Iranocichla), and three in India and Sri Lanka (Etroplus and Pseudetroplus). If disregarding Trinidad and Tobago (where the few native cichlids are members of genera that are widespread in the South American mainland), the three species from the genus Nandopsis are the only cichlids from the Antilles in the Caribbean, specifically Cuba and Hispaniola. Europe, Australia, Antarctica, and North America north of the Rio Grande drainage have no native cichlids, although in Florida, Hawaii, Japan, northern Australia, and elsewhere, feral populations of cichlids have become established as exotics. Although no longer present in Europe except as introductions, tilapias are known to have ranged as far north as Italy during the Miocene.

Although most cichlids are found at relatively shallow depths, several exceptions do exist. The deepest known occurrences are Trematocara at more than 300 m (1,000 ft) below the surface in Lake Tanganyika. Others found in relatively deep waters include species such as Alticorpus macrocleithrum and Pallidochromis tokolosh down to 150 m (500 ft) below the surface in Lake Malawi, and the whitish (nonpigmented) and blind Lamprologus lethops, which is believed to live as deep as 160 m (520 ft) below the surface in the Congo River.

Cichlids are less commonly found in brackish and saltwater habitats, though many species tolerate brackish water for extended periods; Mayaheros urophthalmus, for example, is equally at home in freshwater marshes and mangrove swamps, and lives and breeds in saltwater environments such as the mangrove belts around barrier islands. Several species of Tilapia, Sarotherodon, and Oreochromis are euryhaline and can disperse along brackish coastlines between rivers. Only a few cichlids, however, inhabit primarily brackish or salt water, most notably Etroplus maculatus, Etroplus suratensis, and Sarotherodon melanotheron. The perhaps most extreme habitats for cichlids are the warm hypersaline lakes where the members of the genera Alcolapia and Danakilia are found. Lake Abaeded in Eritrea encompasses the entire distribution of D. dinicolai, and its temperature ranges from 29 to 45 °C (84 to 113 °F). Although the vast majority of Malagasy cichlids are entirely restricted to fresh water, Ptychochromis grandidieri and Paretroplus polyactis are commonly found in coastal brackish water and apparently are salt tolerant, as is also the case for Etroplus maculatus and E. suratensis from India and Sri Lanka.

== Ecology ==
=== Feeding ===
Within the cichlid family, carnivores, herbivores, omnivores, planktivores, and detritivores are known, meaning the Cichlidae encompass essentially the full range of food consumption possible in the animal kingdom. Various species have morphological adaptations for specific food sources, but most cichlids consume a wider variety of foods based on availability. Carnivorous cichlids can be further divided into piscivorous and molluscivorous, since the morphology and hunting behavior differ greatly between the two categories. Piscivorous cichlids eat other fish, fry, larvae, and eggs. Some species eat the offspring of mouthbrooders by head-ramming, wherein the hunter shoves its head into the mouth of a female to expel her young and eat them. Molluscivorous cichlids have several hunting strategies amongst the varieties within the group. Lake Malawi cichlids consume substrate and filter it out through their gill rakers to eat the mollusks that were in the substrate. Gill rakers are finger-like structures that line the gills of some fish to catch any food that might escape through their gills.

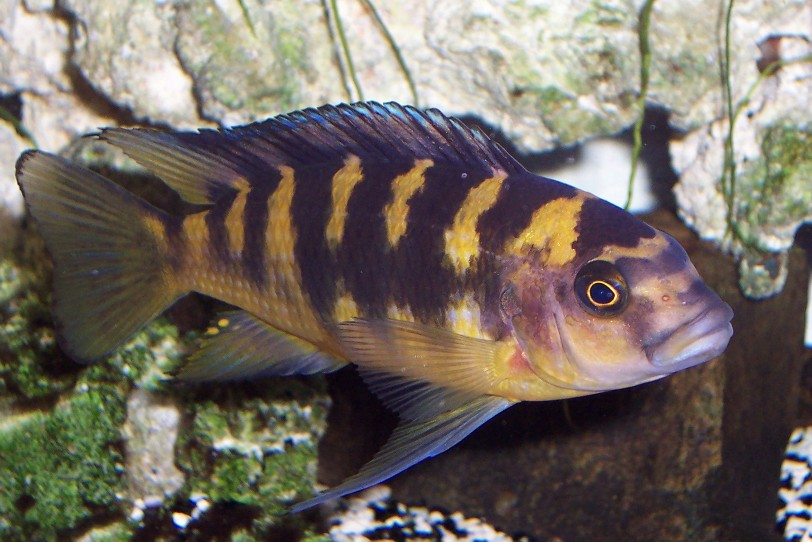
The bumblebee cichlid, Pseudotropheus crabro, is specialised in feeding on parasites from the catfish Bagrus meridionalis.

Many cichlids are primarily herbivores, feeding on algae (e.g. Petrochromis) and plants (e.g. Etroplus suratensis). Small animals, particularly invertebrates, are only a minor part of their diets.

Other cichlids are detritivores and eat organic material, called Aufwuchs (offal); among these species are the tilapiines of the genera Oreochromis, Sarotherodon, and Tilapia.

Other cichlids are predatory and eat little or no plant matter. These include generalists that catch a variety of small animals, including other fishes and insect larvae (e.g. Pterophyllum), as well as variety of specialists. Trematocranus is a specialized snail-eater, while Pungu maclareni feeds on sponges. A number of cichlids feed on other fish, either entirely or in part. Crenicichla species are stealth predators that lunge from concealment at passing small fish, while Rhamphochromis species are open-water pursuit predators that chase down their prey. Paedophagous cichlids such as the Caprichromis species eat other species' eggs or young, in some cases ramming the heads of mouthbrooding species to force them to disgorge their young. Among the more unusual feeding strategies are those of Corematodus, Docimodus evelynae, Plecodus, Perissodus, and Genyochromis spp., which feed on scales and fins of other fishes, a behavior known as lepidophagy, along with the death-mimicking behaviour of Nimbochromis and Parachromis species, which lay motionless, luring small fish to their side prior to ambush.

This variety of feeding styles has helped cichlids to inhabit similarly varied habitats. Its pharyngeal teeth (in the throat) afford cichlids so many "niche" feeding strategies, because the jaws pick and hold food, while the pharyngeal teeth crush the prey.

== Behavior ==
=== Aggression ===
Aggressive behavior in cichlids is ritualized and consists of multiple displays used to seek confrontation while being involved in evaluation of competitors, coinciding with temporal proximity to mating. Displays of ritualized aggression in cichlids include a remarkably rapid change in coloration, during which a successfully dominant territorial male assumes a more vivid and brighter coloration, while a subordinate or "nonterritorial" male assumes a dull-pale coloration. In addition to color displays, cichlids employ their lateral lines to sense movements of water around their opponents to evaluate the competing male for physical traits/fitness. Male cichlids are very territorial due to the pressure of reproduction, and establish their territory and social status by physically driving out challenging males (novel intruders) through lateral displays (parallel orientation, uncovering gills), biting, or mouth fights (head-on collisions of open mouths, measuring jaw sizes, and biting each other's jaws). The cichlid social dichotomy is composed of a single dominant with multiple subordinates, where the physical aggression of males becomes a contest for resources (mates, territory, food). Female cichlids prefer to mate with a successfully alpha male with vivid coloration, whose territory has food readily available.

=== Mating ===
Cichlids mate either monogamously or polygamously. The mating system of a given cichlid species is not consistently associated with its brooding system. For example, although most monogamous cichlids are not mouthbrooders, Chromidotilapia, Gymnogeophagus, Spathodus, and Tanganicodus all include – or consist entirely of – monogamous mouthbrooders. In contrast, numerous open- or cave-spawning cichlids are polygamous; examples include many Apistogramma, Lamprologus, Nannacara, and Pelvicachromis species.

Most adult male cichlids, specifically in the cichlid tribe Haplochromini, exhibit a unique pattern of oval-shaped color dots on their anal fins. These phenomena, known as egg spots, aid in the mouthbrooding mechanisms of cichlids. The egg spots consist of carotenoid-based pigment cells, which indicate a high cost to the organism, when considering that fish are not able to synthesize their own carotenoids.

The mimicry of egg spots is used by males for the fertilization process. Mouthbrooding females lay eggs and immediately snatch them up with their mouths. Over millions of years, male cichlids have evolved egg spots to initiate the fertilization process more efficiently. When the females are snatching up the eggs into their mouth, the males gyrate their anal fins, which illuminates the egg spots on his tail. Afterwards, the female, believing these are her eggs, places her mouth to the anal fin (specifically the genital papilla) of the male, which is when he discharges sperm into her mouth and fertilizes the eggs.

The genuine color of egg spots is a yellow, red, or orange inner circle with a colorless ring surrounding the shape. Through phylogenetic analysis, using the mitochondrial ND2 gene, the true egg spots are thought to have evolved in the common ancestor of the Astatoreochromis lineage and the modern haplochromine species. This ancestor was most likely riverine in origin, based on the most parsimonious representation of habitat type in the cichlid family. The presence of egg spots in a turbid riverine environment would seem particularly beneficial and necessary for intraspecies communication.

Two pigmentation genes are found to be associated with egg-spot patterning and color arrangement. These are fhl2-a and fhl2-b, which are paralogs. These genes aid in pattern formation and cell-fate determination in early embryonic development. The highest expression of these genes was temporally correlated with egg-spot formation. A short, interspersed, repetitive element was also seen to be associated with egg spots. Specifically, it was evident upstream of the transcriptional start site of fhl2 in only Haplochrominis species with egg spots

=== Self-fertilization ===
The cichlid Benitochromis nigrodorsalis from Western Africa ordinarily undergoes biparental reproduction, but is also able to undergo facultative (optional) selfing (self-fertilization). Facultative selfing may be an adaptive option when a mating partner is unavailable.

=== Brood care ===
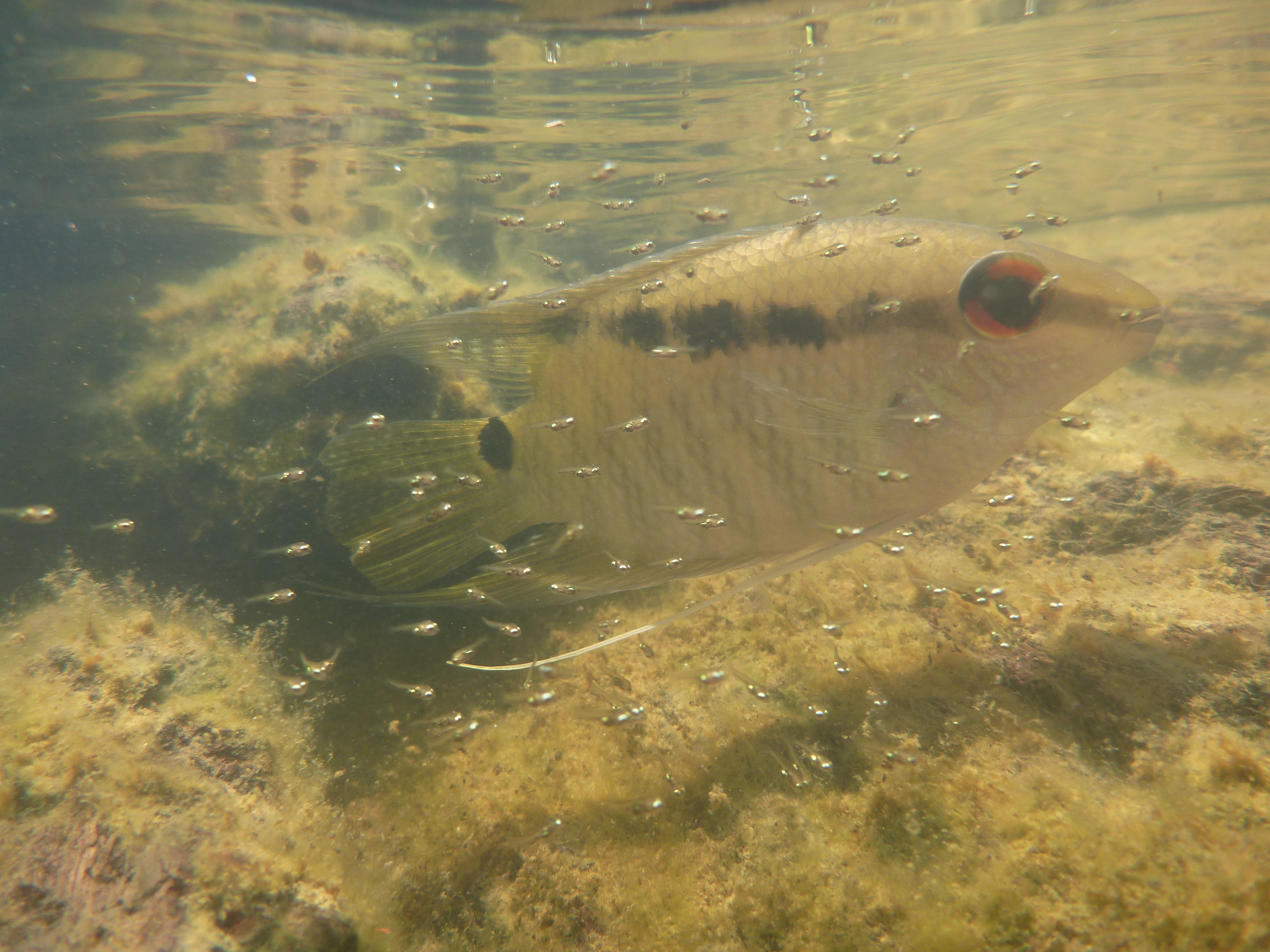
Mesonauta sp. with fry, in Brazil

==== Pit spawning in cichlids ====
Pit spawning, also referred to as substrate breeding, is a behavior in cichlid fish in which a fish builds a pit in the sand or ground, where a pair court and consequently spawn. Many different factors go into this behavior of pit spawning, including female choice of the male and pit size, as well as the male defense of the pits once they are dug in the sand.

Cichlids are often divided into two main groups: mouthbrooders and substrate brooders. Different parenting investment levels and behaviors are associated with each type of reproduction. As pit spawning is a reproductive behavior, many different physiological changes occur in the cichlid while this process is occurring that interfere with social interaction. Different kinds of species that pit spawn, and many different morphological changes occur because of this behavioral experience.

Pit spawning is an evolved behavior across the cichlid group. Phylogenetic evidence from cichlids in Lake Tanganyika could be helpful in uncovering the evolution of their reproductive behaviors. Several important behaviors are associated with pit spawning, including parental care, food provisioning, and brood guarding.

==== Mouth brooding vs. pit spawning ====
One of the differences studied in African cichlids is reproductive behavior. Some species pit spawn and some are known as mouth brooders. Mouthbrooding is a reproductive technique where the fish scoop up eggs and fry for protection. While this behavior differs from species to species in the details, the general basis of the behavior is the same. Mouthbrooding also affects how they choose their mates and breeding grounds. In a 1995 study, Nelson found that in pit-spawning females choose males for mating based on the size of the pit that they dig, as well as some of the physical characteristics seen in the males. Pit spawning also differs from mouth brooding in the size and postnatal care exhibited. Eggs that have been hatched from pit-spawning cichlids are usually smaller than those of mouthbrooders. Pit-spawners' eggs are usually around 2 mm, while mouthbrooders are typically around 7 mm. While different behaviors take place postnatally between mouthbrooders and pit spawners, some similarities exist. Females in both mouthbrooders and pit-spawning cichlids take care of their young after they are hatched. In some cases, both parents exhibit care, but the female always cares for the eggs and newly hatched fry.

==== Pit spawning process ====
Many species of cichlids use pit spawning, but one of the less commonly studied species that exhibits this behavior is the Neotropical Cichlasoma dimerus. This fish is a substrate breeder that displays biparental care after the fry have hatched from their eggs. One study examined reproductive and social behaviors of this species to see how they accomplished their pit spawning, including different physiological factors such as hormone levels, color changes, and plasma cortisol levels. The entire spawning process could take about 90 minutes and 400~800 eggs could be laid. The female deposits about 10 eggs at a time, attaching them to the spawning surface, which may be a pit constructed on the substrate or another surface. The number of eggs laid was correlated to the space available on the substrate. Once the eggs were attached, the male swam over the eggs and fertilized them. The parents would then dig pits in the sand, 10–20 cm (4–8 in) wide and 5–10 cm (2–4 in) deep, where larvae were transferred after hatching. Larvae began swimming 8 days after fertilization and parenting behaviors and some of the physiological factors measured changed.

==== Color changes ====
In the same study, color changes were present before and after the pit spawning occurred. For example, after the larvae were transferred and the pits were beginning to be protected, their fins turned a dark grey color. In another study, of the rainbow cichlid, Herotilapia multispinosa, color changes occurred throughout the spawning process. Before spawning, the rainbow cichlid was an olive color with grey bands. Once spawning behaviors started, the body and fins of the fish became a more golden color. When the eggs were finished being laid, the pelvic fin all the way back to the caudal fin turned to a darker color and blackened in both the males and the females.

==== Pit sizes ====
Females prefer a bigger pit size when choosing where to lay eggs. Differences are seen in the sizes of pits that created, as well as a change in the morphology of the pits. Evolutionary differences between species of fish may cause them to either create pits or castles when spawning. The differences were changes in the way that each species fed, their macrohabitats, and the abilities of their sensory systems.

==== Evolution ====
Cichlids are renowned for their recent, rapid evolutionary radiation, both across the entire clade and within different communities across separate habitats. Within their phylogeny, many parallel instances are seen of lineages evolving to the same trait and multiple cases of reversion to an ancestral trait.

The family Cichlidae arose between 80 and 100 million years ago within the order Perciformes (perch-like fishes). Cichlidae can be split into a few groups based on their geographic location: Madagascar, Indian, African, and Neotropical (or South American). The most famous and diverse group, the African cichlids, can be further split either into Eastern and Western varieties, or into groups depending on which lake the species is from: Lake Malawi, Lake Victoria, or Lake Tanganyika. Of these subgroups, the Madagascar and Indian cichlids are the most basal and least diverse.

Of the African cichlids, the West African or Lake Tanganyika cichlids are the most basal. Cichlids' common ancestor is believed to have been a spit-spawning species. Both Madagascar and Indian cichlids retain this feature. However, of the African cichlids, all extant substrate brooding species originate solely from Lake Tanganyika. The ancestor of the Lake Malawi and Lake Victoria cichlids were mouthbrooders. Similarly, only around 30% of South American cichlids are thought to retain the ancestral substrate-brooding trait. Mouthbrooding is thought to have evolved individually up to 14 times, and a return to substrate brooding as many as three separate times between both African and Neotropical species.

==== Associated behaviors ====
Cichlids have a great variety of behaviors associated with substrate brooding, including courtship and parental care alongside the brooding and nest-building behaviors needed for pit spawning. Cichlids' behavior typically revolves around establishing and defending territories when not courting, brooding, or raising young. Encounters between males and males or females and females are agonistic, while an encounter between a male and female leads to courtship. Courtship in male cichlids follows the establishment of some form of territory, sometimes coupled with building a bower to attract mates. After this, males may attempt to attract female cichlids to their territories by a variety of lekking display strategies or otherwise seek out females of their species. However, cichlids, at the time of spawning, undergo a behavioral change such that they become less receptive to outside interactions. This is often coupled with some physiological change in appearance.

==== Brood care ====
Cichlids can have maternal, paternal, or biparental care. Maternal care is most common among mouthbrooders, but cichlids' common ancestor is thought to exhibit paternal-only care. Other individuals outside of the parents may also play a role in raising young; in the biparental daffodil cichlid (Neolamprologus pulcher), closely related satellite males, those males that surround other males' territories and attempt to mate with female cichlids in the area, help rear the primary males' offspring and their own.

A common form of brood care involves food provisioning. For example, females of lyretail cichlids (Neolamprologus modabu) dig at sandy substrate more to push nutritional detritus and zooplankton into the surrounding water. Adult of N. modabu perform this strategy to collect food for themselves, but dig more when offspring are present, likely to feed their fry. This substrate-disruption strategy is rather common and can also be seen in convict cichlids (Cichlasoma nigrofasciatum). Other cichlids have an ectothermal mucus that they grow and feed to their young, while still others chew and distribute caught food to offspring. These strategies, however, are less common in pit-spawning cichlids.

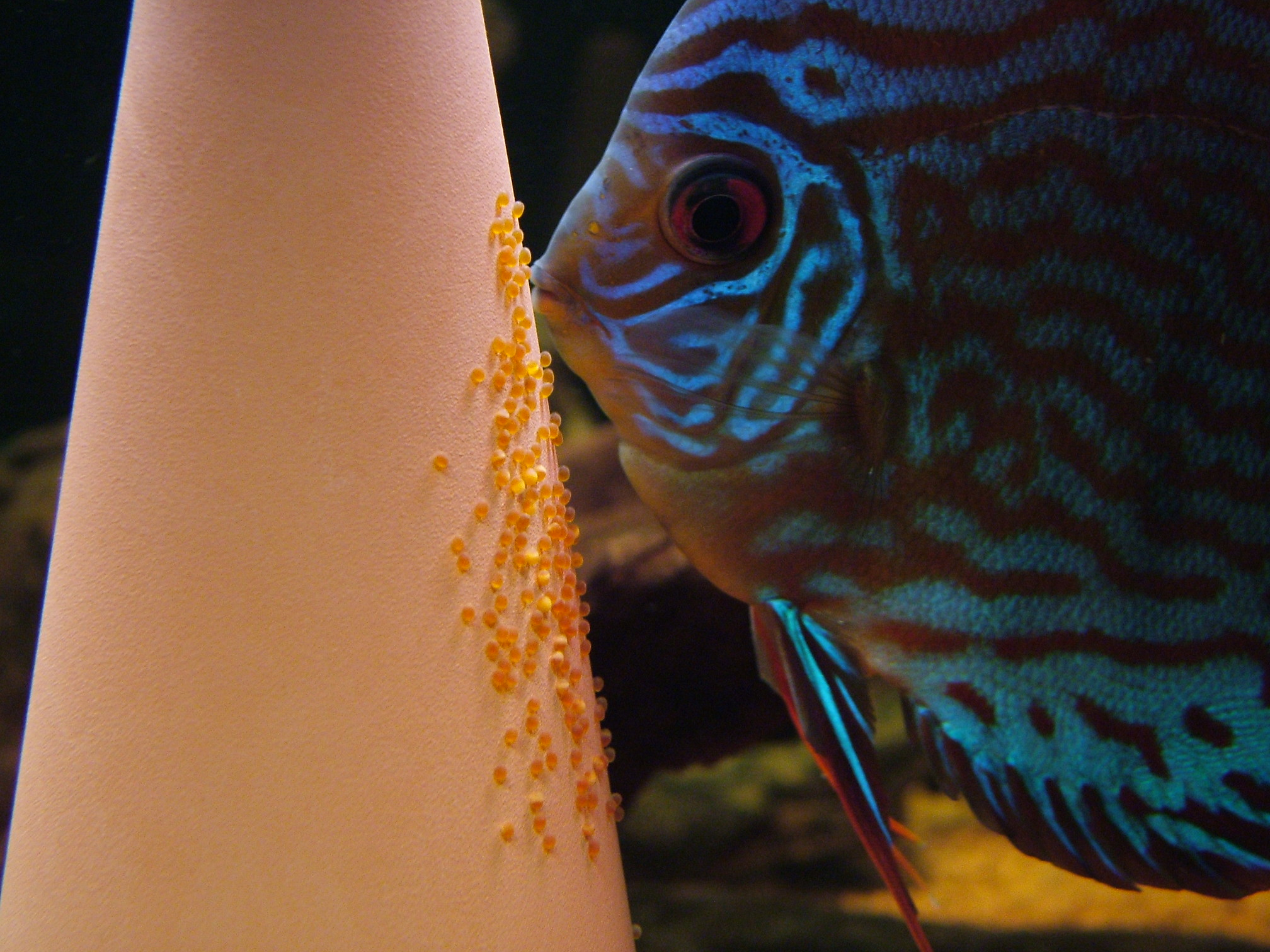
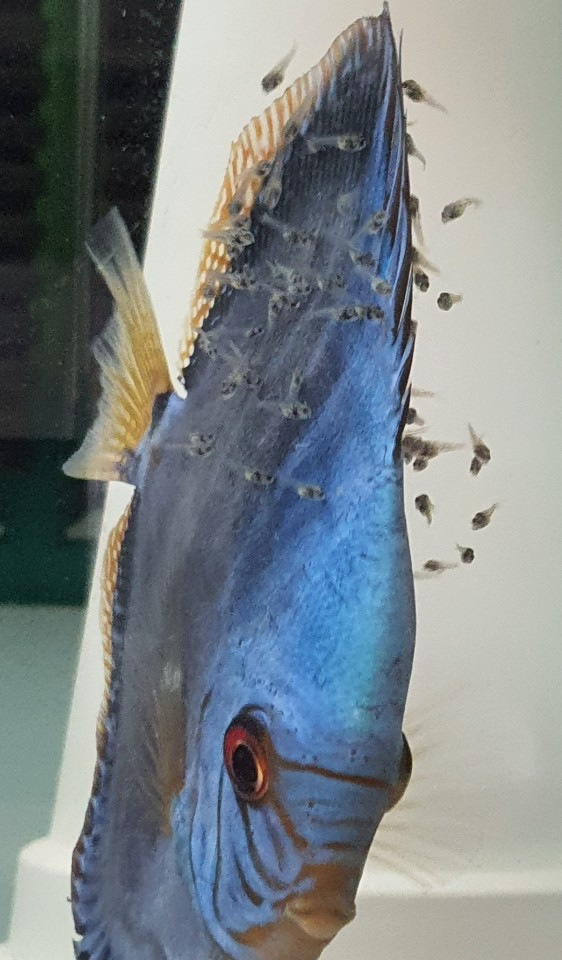
Symphysodon with eggs (left) and young feeding on parent's mucus (right)

Cichlids have highly organized breeding activities. All species show some form of parental care for both eggs and larvae, often nurturing free-swimming young until they are weeks or months old. Communal parental care, where multiple monogamous pairs care for a mixed school of young have also been observed in multiple cichlid species, including Amphilophus citrinellus, Etroplus suratensis, and Tilapia rendalli. Comparably, the fry of Neolamprologus brichardi, a species that commonly lives in large groups, are protected not only by the adults, but also by older juveniles from previous spawns. Several cichlids, including discus (Symphysodon spp.), some Amphilophus species, Etroplus, and Uaru species, feed their young with a skin secretion from mucous glands.

The species Neolamprologus pulcher uses a cooperative breeding system, in which one breeding pair has many helpers that are subordinate to the dominant breeders.

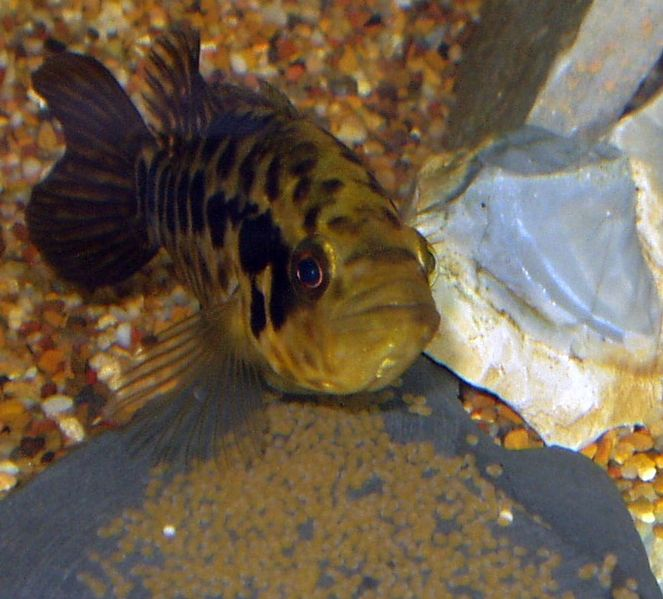
A substrate brooding female managuense cichlid, Parachromis managuense, guards a clutch of eggs in the aquarium.

Parental care falls into one of four categories: substrate or open brooders, secretive cave brooders (also known as guarding speleophils), and at least two types of mouthbrooders, ovophile mouthbrooders and larvophile mouthbrooders.

==== Open brooding ====
Open- or substrate-brooding cichlids lay their eggs in the open, on rocks, leaves, or logs. Examples of open-brooding cichlids include Pterophyllum and Symphysodon species and Anomalochromis thomasi. Male and female parents usually engage in differing brooding roles. Most commonly, the male patrols the pair's territory and repels intruders, while the female fans water over the eggs, removing the infertile ones, and leading the fry while foraging. Both sexes are able to perform the full range of parenting behaviours.

==== Cave brooding ====
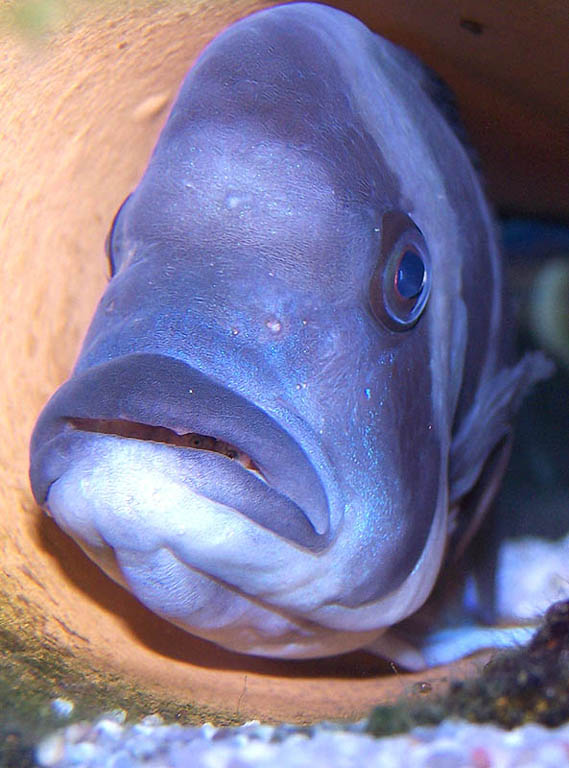
A female Cyphotilapia frontosa mouthbrooding fry, which can be seen looking out of her mouth

Secretive cave-spawning cichlids lay their eggs in caves, crevices, holes, or discarded mollusc shells, frequently attaching the eggs to the roof of the chamber. Examples include Pelvicachromis spp., Archocentrus spp., and Apistogramma spp. Free-swimming fry and parents communicate in captivity and in the wild. Frequently, this communication is based on body movements, such as shaking and pelvic fin flicking. In addition, open- and cave-brooding parents assist in finding food resources for their fry. Multiple neotropical cichlid species perform leaf-turning and fin-digging behaviors.

==== Ovophile mouthbrooding ====
Ovophile mouthbrooders incubate their eggs in their mouths as soon as they are laid, and frequently mouthbrood free-swimming fry for several weeks. Examples include many East African Rift lakes (Lake Malawi, Lake Tanganyika, and Lake Victoria) endemics, e.g.: Maylandia, Pseudotropheus, Tropheus, and Astatotilapia burtoni, along with some South American cichlids such as Geophagus steindachneri.

==== Larvophile mouthbrooding ====
Larvophile mouthbrooders lay eggs in the open or in a cave and take the hatched larvae into the mouth. Examples include some variants of Geophagus altifrons, and some Aequidens, Gymnogeophagus, and Satanoperca, as well as Oreochromis mossambicus and Oreochromis niloticus. Mouthbrooders, whether of eggs or larvae, are predominantly females. Exceptions that also involve the males include eretmodine cichlids (genera Spathodus, Eretmodus, and Tanganicodus), some Sarotherodon species (such as Sarotherodon melanotheron), Chromidotilapia guentheri, and some Aequidens species. This method appears to have evolved independently in several groups of African cichlids.

== Speciation ==
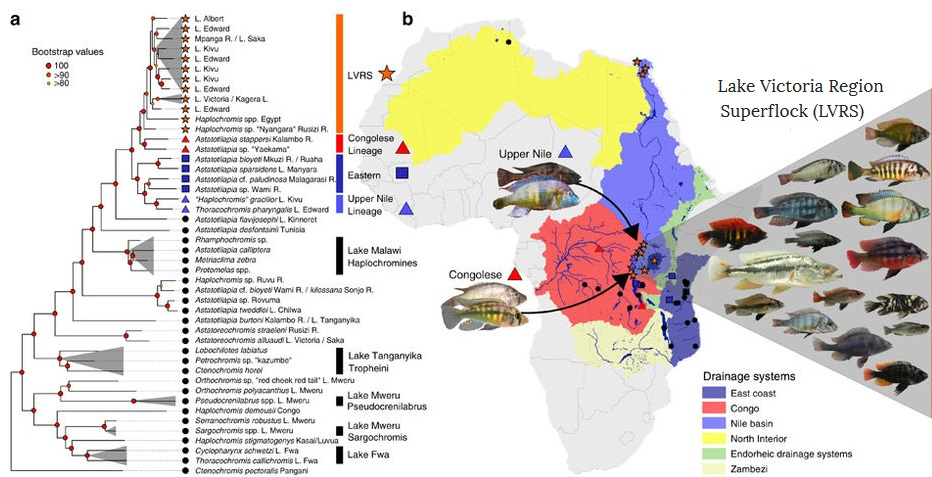
Cichlids of the African rift lake system evolved from an original hybrid swarm.

Cichlids provide scientists with a unique perspective of speciation, having become extremely diverse in the recent geological past, those of Lake Victoria actually within the last 10,000 to 15,000 years, a small fraction of the millions taken for Galápagos finch speciation in Darwin's textbook case. Some of the contributing factors to their diversification are believed to be the various forms of prey processing displayed by cichlid pharyngeal jaw apparatuses. These different jaw apparatuses allow for a broad range of feeding strategies, including algae scraping, snail crushing, planktivory, piscivory, and insectivory. Some cichlids can also show phenotypic plasticity in their pharyngeal jaws, which can also help lead to speciation. In response to different diets or food scarcity, members of the same species can display different jaw morphologies that are better suited to different feeding strategies. As species members begin to concentrate around different food sources and continue their lifecycle, they most likely spawn with like individuals. This can reinforce the jaw morphology and given enough time, create new species. Such a process can happen through allopatric speciation, whereby species diverge according to different selection pressures in different geographical areas, or through sympatric speciation, by which new species evolve from a common ancestor while remaining in the same area. In Lake Apoyo in Nicaragua, Amphilophus zaliosus and its sister species Amphilophus citrinellus display many of the criteria needed for sympatric speciation. In the African rift lake system, cichlid species in numerous distinct lakes evolved from a shared hybrid swarm.

== Population status ==
In 2010, the International Union for Conservation of Nature classified 184 species as vulnerable, 52 as endangered, and 106 as critically endangered. At present, the IUCN only lists Yssichromis sp. nov. argens as extinct in the wild, and six species are listed as entirely extinct, but many more possibly belong in these categories (for example, Haplochromis aelocephalus, H. apogonoides, H. dentex, H. dichrourus, and numerous other members of the genus Haplochromis have not been seen since the 1980s, but are maintained as critically endangered on the small chance that tiny –but currently unknown– populations survive).

=== Lake Victoria ===
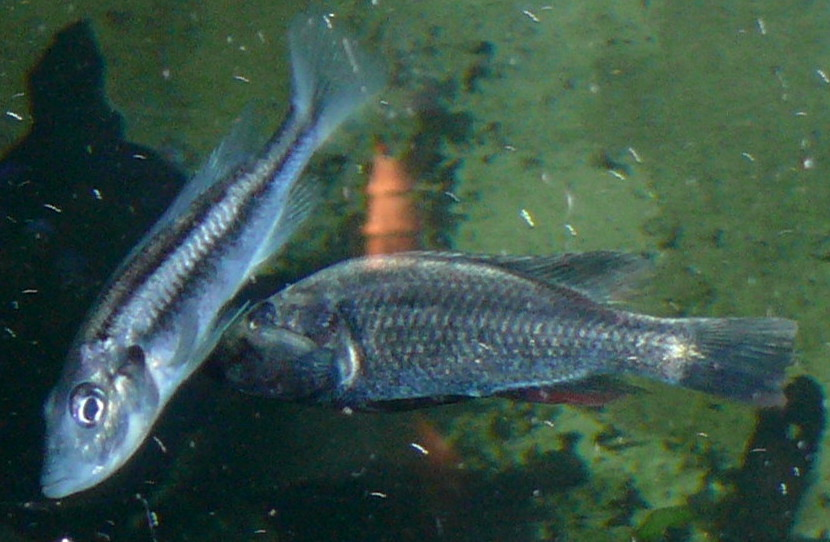
Haplochromis thereuterion has declined, but still survives in low numbers.

Because of the introduced Nile perch (Lates niloticus), Nile tilapia (Oreochromis niloticus), and water hyacinth, deforestation that led to water siltation, and overfishing, many Lake Victoria cichlid species have become extinct or been drastically reduced. By around 1980, lake fisheries yielded only 1% cichlids, a drastic decline from 80% in earlier years.

By far the largest Lake Victoria group is the haplochromine cichlids, with more than 500 species, but at least 200 of these (about 40%) have become extinct, and many others are seriously threatened. Initially it was feared that the percentage of extinct species was even higher, but some species have been rediscovered after the Nile perch started to decline in the 1990s. Some species have survived in nearby small satellite lakes, or in refugia among rocks or papyrus sedges (protecting them from the Nile perch), or have adapted to the human-induced changes in the lake itself. The species were often specialists and these were not affected to the same extent. For example, the piscivorous haplochromines were particularly hard hit with a high number of extinctions, while the zooplanktivorous haplochromines reached densities in 2001 that were similar to before the drastic decline, although consisting of fewer species and with some changes in their ecology.

== Food and game fish ==
Although cichlids are mostly small- to medium-sized, many are well-regarded as food and game fishes. With few thick rib bones and, according to George W. Barlow, tasty flesh, artisan fishing is not uncommon in Central America and South America, as well as areas surrounding the African rift lakes.

=== Tilapia ===
The most important food cichlids, however, are the tilapiines of North Africa. Fast growing, tolerant of stocking density, and adaptable, tilapiine species have been introduced and farmed extensively in many parts of Asia and are increasingly common aquaculture targets elsewhere.

Farmed tilapia production is about 1,500,000 tonnes (1,700,000 short tons) annually, with an estimated value of US$1.8 billion, about equal to that of salmon and trout.

Unlike those carnivorous fish, tilapia can feed on algae or any plant-based food. This reduces the cost of tilapia farming, reduces fishing pressure on prey species, avoids concentrating toxins that accumulate at higher levels of the food chain, and makes tilapia the preferred "aquatic chickens" of the trade.

=== Game fish ===
Many large cichlids are popular game fish. The peacock bass (Cichla species) of South America is one of the most popular sportfish. It was introduced in many waters around the world. In Florida, this fish generates millions of hours of fishing and sportfishing revenue of more than US$8 million a year. Other cichlids preferred by anglers include the oscar, Mayan cichlid (Cichlasoma urophthalmus), and jaguar cichlid (Parachromis managuensis).

== Aquarium fish ==
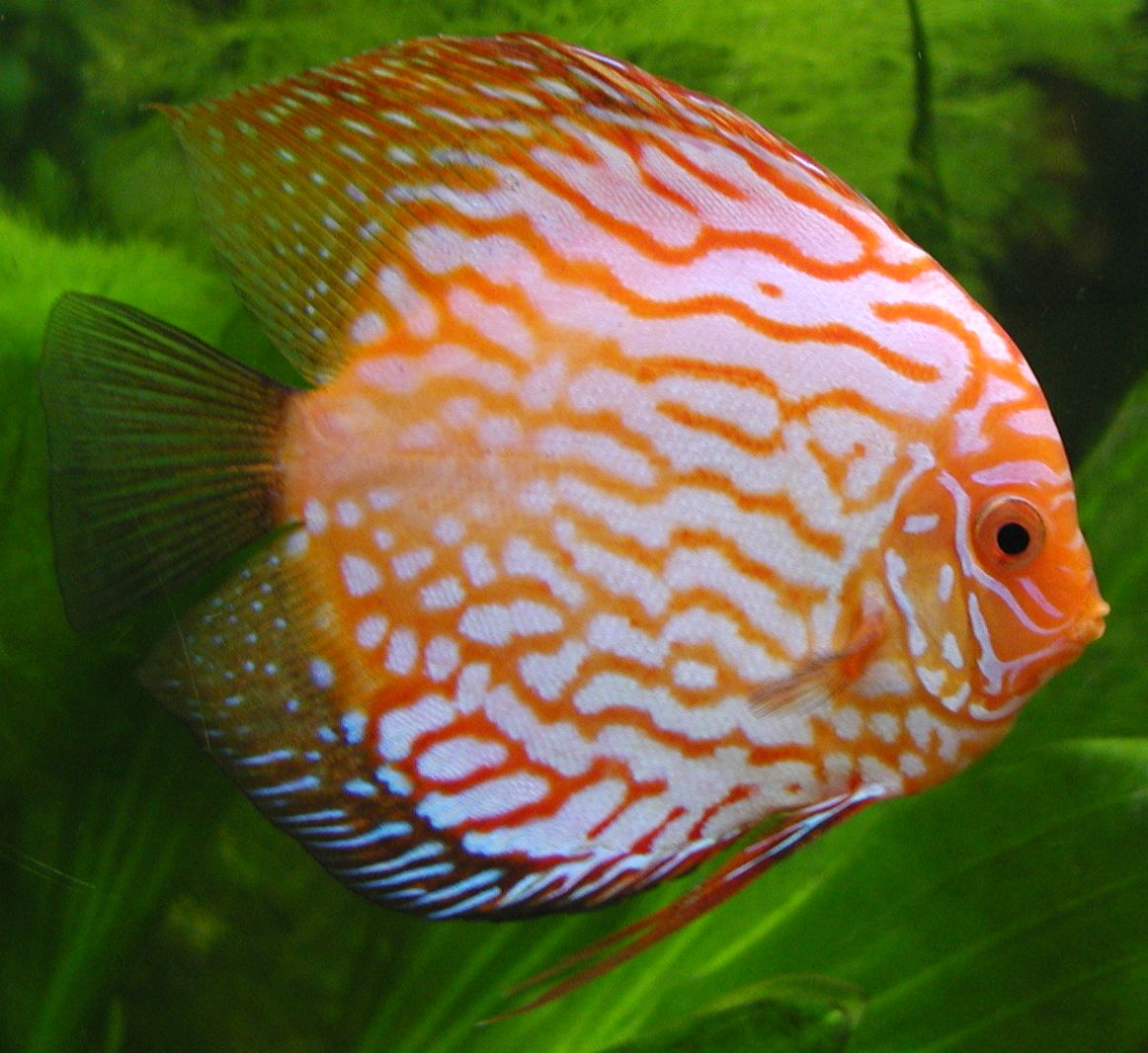
The discus, Symphysodon spp., has been popular among aquarium enthusiasts.

Since 1945, cichlids have become increasingly popular as aquarium fish.

The most common species in hobbyist aquaria is Pterophyllum scalare from the Amazon River basin in tropical South America, known in the trade as the "angelfish". Other popular or readily available species include the oscar (Astronotus ocellatus), convict cichlid (Archocentrus nigrofasciatus) and discus fish (Symphysodon).

== Hybrids and selective breeding ==
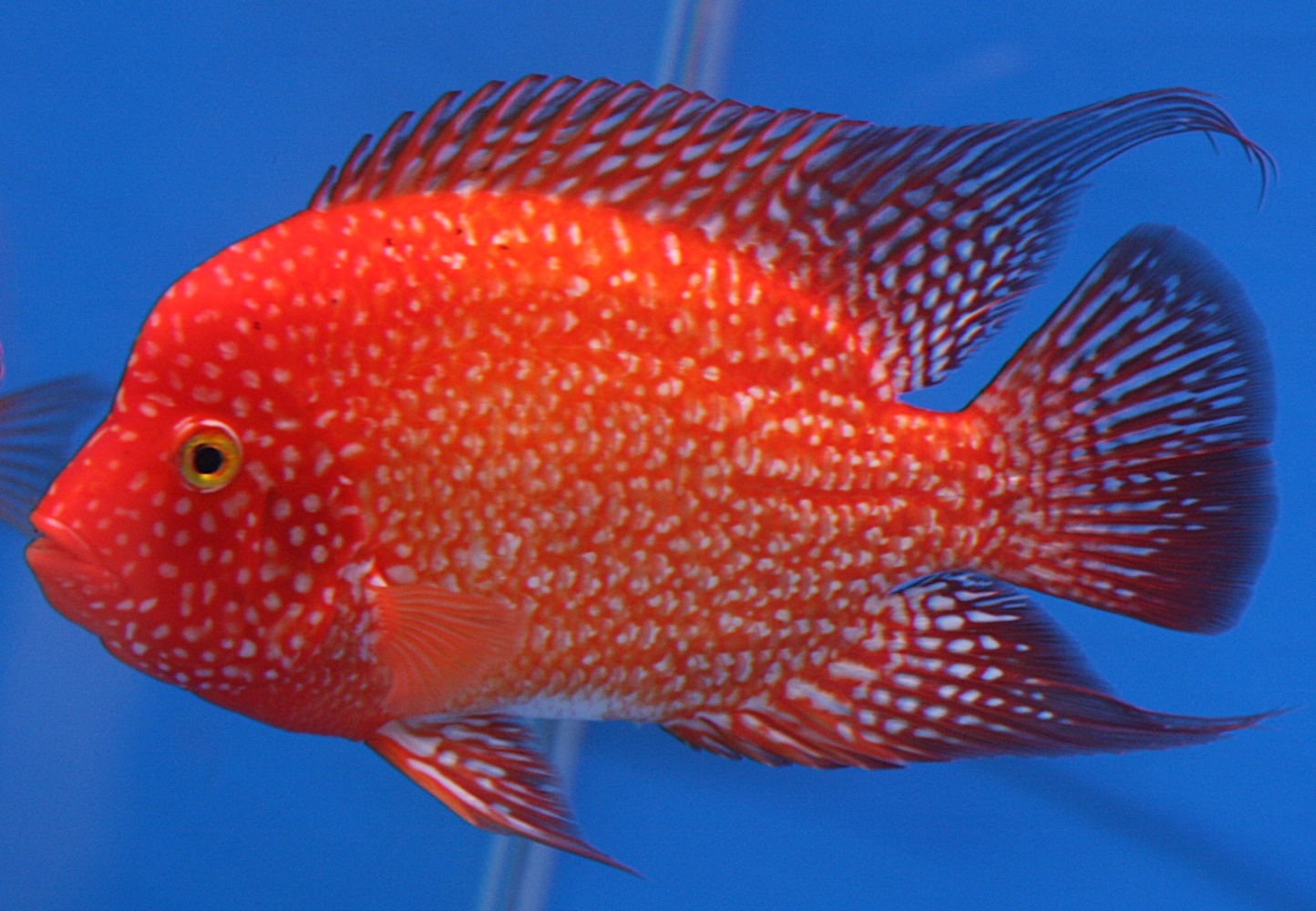
The "red Texas cichlid" is not a Texas cichlid (Herichthys cyanoguttatus) but a cross-genus hybrid of Herichthys and Amphilophus parents.

Some cichlids readily hybridize with related species, both in the wild and under artificial conditions. Other groups of fishes, such as European cyprinids, also hybridize. Unusually, cichlid hybrids have been put to extensive commercial use, in particular for aquaculture and aquaria. The hybrid red strain of tilapia, for example, is often preferred in aquaculture for its rapid growth. Tilapia hybridization can produce all-male populations to control stock density or prevent reproduction in ponds.

=== Aquarium hybrids ===
The most common aquarium hybrid is perhaps the blood parrot cichlid, which is a cross of several species, especially from species in the genus Amphilophus. There are many hypotheses, but the most likely is: Amphilophus labiatus × Vieja synspillus With a triangular-shaped mouth, an abnormal spine, and an occasionally missing caudal fin (known as the "love heart" parrot cichlid), the fish is controversial among aquarists. Some have called blood parrot cichlids "the Frankenstein monster of the fish world". Another notable hybrid, the flowerhorn cichlid, was very popular in some parts of Asia from 2001 until late 2003, and is believed to bring good luck to its owner. The popularity of the flowerhorn cichlid declined in 2004. Owners released many specimens into the rivers and canals of Malaysia and Singapore, where they threaten endemic communities.

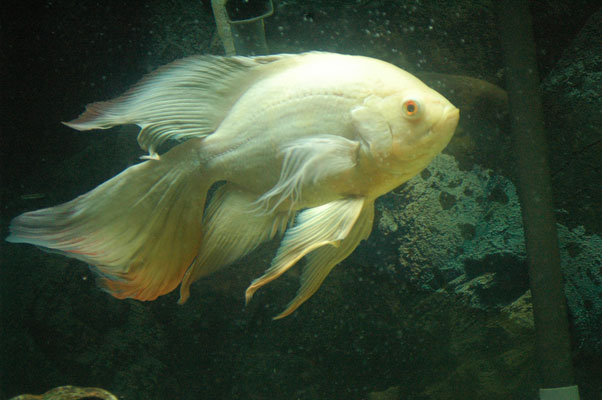
A leucistic long-finned form of the oscar, A. ocellatus

Numerous cichlid species have been selectively bred to develop ornamental aquarium strains. The most intensive programs have involved angelfish and discus, and many mutations that affect both coloration and fins are known. Other cichlids have been bred for albino, leucistic, and xanthistic pigment mutations, including oscars, convict cichlid and Pelvicachromis pulcher. Both dominant and recessive pigment mutations have been observed. In convict cichlids, for example, a leucistic coloration is recessively inherited, while in Oreochromis niloticus niloticus, red coloration is caused by a dominant inherited mutation.

This selective breeding may have unintended consequences. For example, hybrid strains of Mikrogeophagus ramirezi have health and fertility problems. Similarly, intentional inbreeding can cause physical abnormalities, such as the notched phenotype in angelfish.

== Genera ==
The genus list is as per FishBase. Studies are continuing, however, on the members of this family, particularly the haplochromine cichlids of the African rift lakes.

- Abactochromis Oliver & Arnegard 2010
- Acarichthys C. H. Eigenmann 1912
- Acaronia Myers 1940
- Alcolapia Thys van den Audenaerde 1969
- Allochromis Greenwood 1980
- Alticorpus Stauffer & McKaye 1988
- Altolamprologus Poll 1986
- Amatitlania Schmitter-Soto, 2007
- Amphilophus Agassiz, 1859
- Andinoacara Musilova, Rican, & Novak 2009
- Anomalochromis Greenwood 1985
- Apistogramma Regan 1913
- Apistogrammoides Meinken 1965
- Aristochromis Trewavas, 1935
- Asprotilapia Boulenger 1901
- Astatoreochromis Pellegrin 1904
- Astatotilapia Pellegrin 1904
- Astronotus Swainson 1839
- Aulonocara Regan 1922
- Aulonocranus Regan 1920
- Australoheros Rican & Kullander 2006
- Baileychromis Poll 1986
- Bathybates Boulenger 1898
- Benitochromis Lamboj 2001
- Benthochromis Poll 1986
- Biotodoma Eigenmann & Kennedy 1903
- Biotoecus Eigenmann & Kennedy 1903
- Boulengerochromis Pellegrin 1904
- Buccochromis Eccles & Trewavas 1989
- Bujurquina Kullander 1986
- Callochromis Regan 1920
- Caprichromis Eccles & Trewavas 1989
- Caquetaia Fowler 1945
- Cardiopharynx Poll 1942
- Chaetobranchopsis Steindachner, 1875
- Chaetobranchus Heckel, 1840
- Chalinochromis Poll 1974
- Champsochromis Boulenger 1915
- Cheilochromis Eccles & Trewavas 1989
- Chetia Trewavas 1961
- Chilochromis Boulenger 1902
- Chilotilapia Boulenger 1908
- Chindongo Li, Konings & Stauffer 2016
- Chromidotilapia Boulenger 1898
- Cichla Bloch & Schneider 1801
- Cichlasoma Swainson 1839
- Cleithracara Kullander & Nijssen 1989
- Coelotilapia
- Congochromis Stiassny & Schliewen 2007
- Congolapia Dunz, Vreven & Schliewen 2012
- Copadichromis Eccles & Trewavas 1989
- Coptodon Gervais 1853
- Corematodus Boulenger 1897
- Crenicara Steindachner 1875
- Crenicichla Heckel 1840
- Cryptoheros Allgayer 2001
- Ctenochromis Pfeffer 1893
- Ctenopharynx Eccles & Trewavas 1989
- Cunningtonia Boulenger 1906
- Cyathochromis Trewavas 1935
- Cyathopharynx Regan 1920
- Cyclopharynx Poll 1948
- Cynotilapia Regan 1922
- Cyphotilapia Regan 1920
- Cyprichromis Scheuermann 1977
- Cyrtocara Boulenger 1902
- Danakilia Thys van den Audenaerde 1969
- Dicrossus Steindachner 1875
- Dimidiochromis Eccles & Trewavas 1989
- Diplotaxodon Trewavas 1935
- Divandu Lamboj & Snoeks 2000
- Docimodus Boulenger 1897
- Eclectochromis Eccles & Trewavas 1989
- Ectodus Boulenger 1898
- Enantiopus Boulenger 1906
- Enigmatochromis Lamboj 2009
- Eretmodus Boulenger 1898
- Etia Schliewen & Stiassny 2003
- Etroplus Cuvier 1830
- Exochochromis Eccles & Trewavas 1989
- Fossorochromis Eccles & Trewavas 1989
- Genyochromis Trewavas 1935
- Geophagus Heckel 1840
- Gephyrochromis Boulenger 1901
- Gnathochromis Poll 1981
- Gobiocichla Kanazawa 1951
- Grammatotria Boulenger 1899
- Greenwoodochromis Poll 1983
- Guianacara Kullander & Nijssen 1989
- Gymnogeophagus Miranda Ribeiro 1918
- Haplochromis Hilgendorf 1888
- Haplotaxodon Boulenger 1906
- Hemeraia Varella, Kullander, Menezes, López-Fernández & Oliveira, 2023
- Hemibates Regan 1920
- Hemichromis Peters 1857
- Hemitaeniochromis Eccles & Trewavas 1989
- Hemitilapia Boulenger 1902
- Herichthys Baird & Girard 1854
- Heroina Kullander, 1996
- Heros Heckel, 1840
- Heterochromis Regan 1922
- Heterotilapia Regan 1920
- Hoplarchus Kaup,1860
- Hypselecara Kullander 1986
- Hypsophrys Agassiz 1859
- Interochromis Yamaoka, Hori & Kuwamura 1988
- Iodotropheus Oliver & Loiselle 1972
- Iranocichla Coad 1982
- Jabarichromis Haefeli, Schedel, Ronco, Indermaur & Salzburger, 2024
- Julidochromis Boulenger 1898
- Katria Stiassny & Sparks 2006
- Konia Trewavas 1972
- Krobia Kullander & Nijssen 1989
- Labeotropheus Ahl 1926
- Labidochromis Trewavas 1935
- Laetacara Kullander 1986
- Lamprologus Schilthuis 1891
- Lepidiolamprologus Pellegrin 1904
- Lestradea Poll 1943
- Lethrinops Regan 1922
- Lichnochromis Trewavas 1935
- Limbochromis Greenwood 1987
- Limnochromis Regan 1920
- Limnotilapia Regan 1920
- Lithochromis Lippitsch & Seehausen 1998
- Lobochilotes Boulenger 1915
- †Mahengechromis Murray 2001
- Lugubria Varella, Kullander, Menezes, López-Fernández & Oliveira, 2023
- Maylandia Meyer & Foerster 1984
- Mazarunia Kullander 1990
- Mbipia Lippitsch & Seehausen 1998
- Mchenga Stauffer & Konings, 2006
- Melanochromis Trewavas, 1935
- Mesonauta Günther, 1862
- Microchromis Johnson 1975
- Microdontochromis Poll 1986
- Mikrogeophagus Meulengracht-Madson 1968
- Myaka Trewavas 1972
- Mylochromis Regan 1920
- Naevochromis Eccles & Trewavas 1989
- Nandopsis Gill, 1862
- Nannacara Regan 1905
- Nanochromis Pellegrin 1904
- Neochromis Regan 1920
- Neolamprologus Colombe & Allgayer 1985
- Nimbochromis Eccles & Trewavas 1989
- Nyassachromis Eccles & Trewavas 1989
- Ophthalmotilapia Pellegrin 1904
- Oreochromis Günther 1889
- Orthochromis Greenwood 1954
- Otopharynx Regan 1920
- Oxylapia Kiener & Maugé 1966
- Pallidochromis Turner 1994
- Parachromis Agassiz 1859
- Paracyprichromis Poll 1986
- Parananochromis Greenwood 1987
- Paraneetroplus Regan 1905
- Paratilapia Bleeker, 1868
- Paretroplus Bleeker, 1868
- Pelmatochromis Steindachner 1894
- Pelmatolapia Thys van den Audenaerde 1969
- Pelvicachromis Thys van den Audenaerde 1968
- Perissodus Boulenger 1898
- Petenia Günther, 1862
- Petrochromis Boulenger 1898
- Petrotilapia Trewavas 1935
- Pharyngochromis Greenwood 1979
- Placidochromis Eccles & Trewavas 1989
- Plecodus Boulenger 1898
- †Plesioheros Malabarba, Zuleta & del Papa 2006
- †Proterocara Perez, Malabarba, & del Papa 2010
- Protomelas Eccles & Trewavas 1989
- Pseudocrenilabrus Fowler 1934
- Pseudosimochromis Nelissen 1977
- Pseudotropheus Regan 1922
- Pterochromis Trewavas 1973
- Pterophyllum Heckel 1840
- Ptychochromis Steindachner 1880
- Ptychochromoides Kiener & Mauge 1966
- Pundamilia Seehausen & Lippitsch 1998
- Pungu Trewavas 1972
- Reganochromis Whitley 1929
- Retroculus Eigenmann & Bray 1894
- Rhamphochromis Regan 1922
- Rocio Schmitter-Soto, 2007
- Sargochromis Regan 1920
- Sarotherodon Rppell 1852
- Satanoperca Günther, 1862
- Saxatilia Varella, Kullander, Menezes, López-Fernández & Oliveira, 2023
- Schwetzochromis Poll 1948
- Sciaenochromis Eccles & Trewavas 1989
- Serranochromis Regan 1920
- Shuja Genner, Ngatunga & Turner 2022
- Simochromis Boulenger 1898
- Spathodus Boulenger 1900
- Steatocranus Boulenger 1899
- Stigmatochromis Eccles & Trewavas 1989
- Stomatepia Trewavas 1962
- Symphysodon Heckel 1840
- Taeniacara Myers 1935
- Taeniochromis Eccles & Trewavas 1989
- Taeniolethrinops Eccles & Trewavas 1989
- Tahuantinsuyoa Kullander 1991
- Tangachromis Poll 1981
- Tanganicodus Poll 1950
- Teleocichla Kullander 1988
- Teleogramma Boulenger 1899
- Telmatochromis Boulenger 1898
- Theraps Günther, 1862
- Thoracochromis Greenwood 1979
- Thorichthys Meek 1904
- Thysochromis Daget 1988
- Tilapia Smith, 1840 See also: Tilapiine cichlids
- Tomocichla Regan 1908
- Tramitichromis Eccles & Trewavas 1989
- Trematocara Boulenger 1899
- Trematocranus Trewavas 1935
- †Tremembichthys Malabarba & Malabarba 2008
- Triglachromis Poll & Thys van den Audenaerde 1974
- Tristramella Trewavas 1942
- Tropheops Trewavas 1984
- Tropheus Boulenger 1898
- Tylochromis Regan 1920
- Tyrannochromis Eccles & Trewavas 1989
- Uaru Heckel 1840
- Variabilichromis Colombe & Allgayer 1985
- Wallaciia Varella, Kullander, Menezes, López-Fernández & Oliveira, 2023
- †Warilochromis Altner, Ruthensteiner & Reichenbacher 2008
- Xenochromis Boulenger 1899
- Xenotilapia Boulenger 1899

== Gallery ==
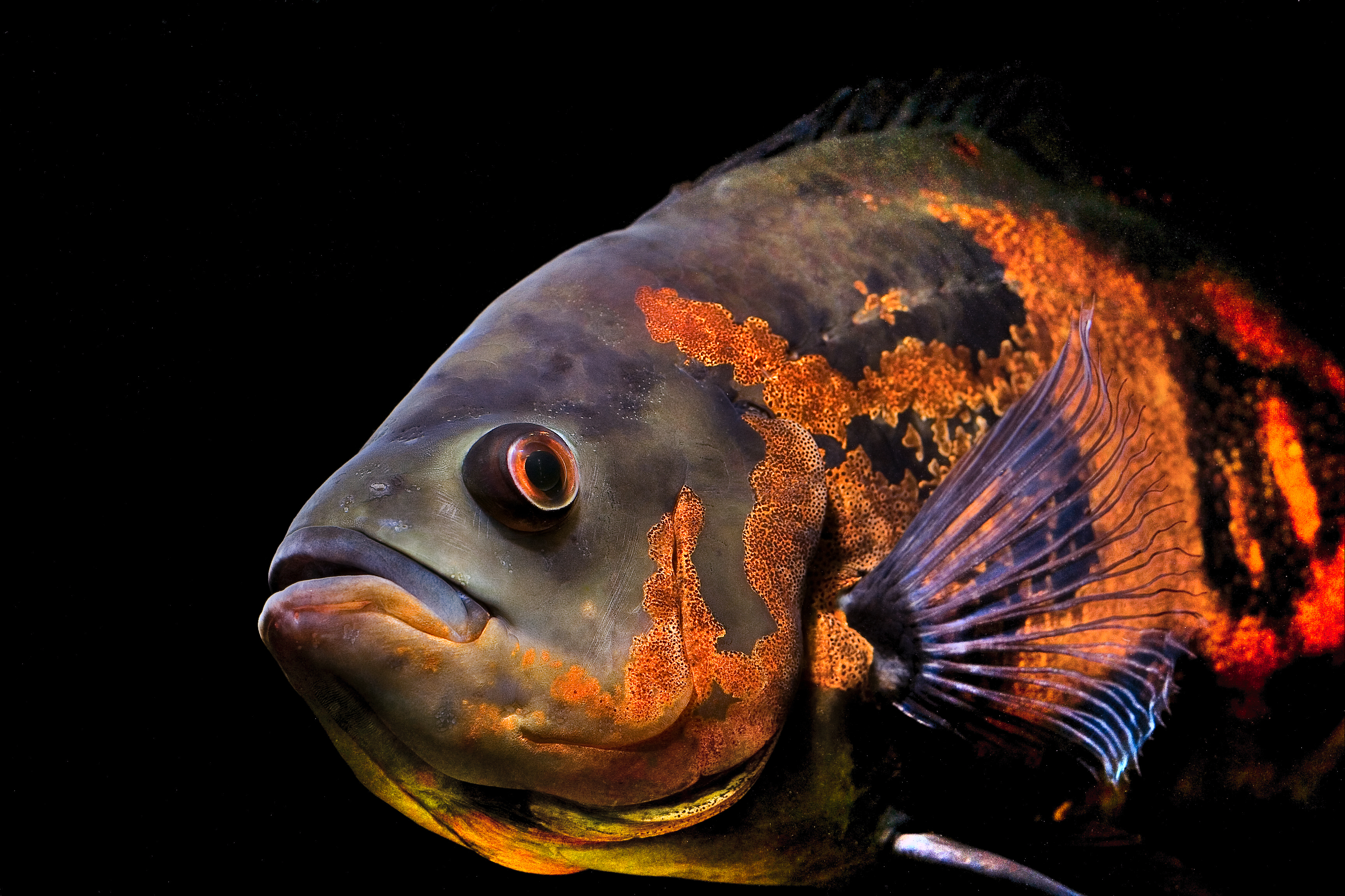
The oscar (Astronotus ocellatus) is one of the most popular cichlids in the fishkeeping hobby.

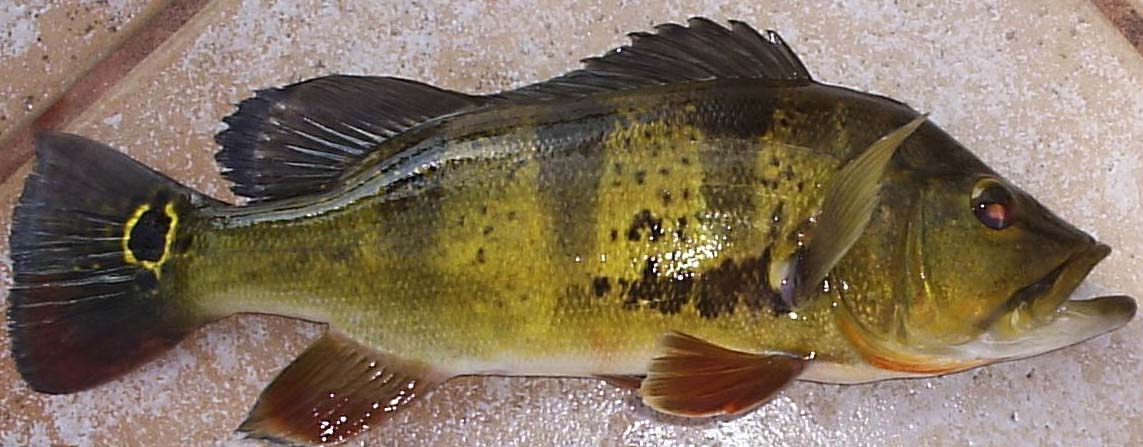
The butterfly peacock bass (Cichla ocellaris) was introduced intentionally in Florida as gamefish.

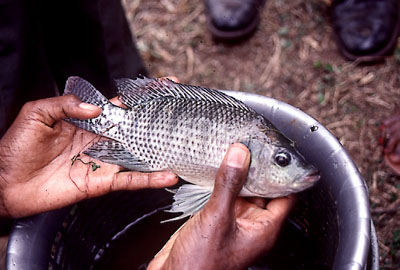
The Nile tilapia (Oreochromis niloticus) is farmed extensively as food fish in many parts of the world.

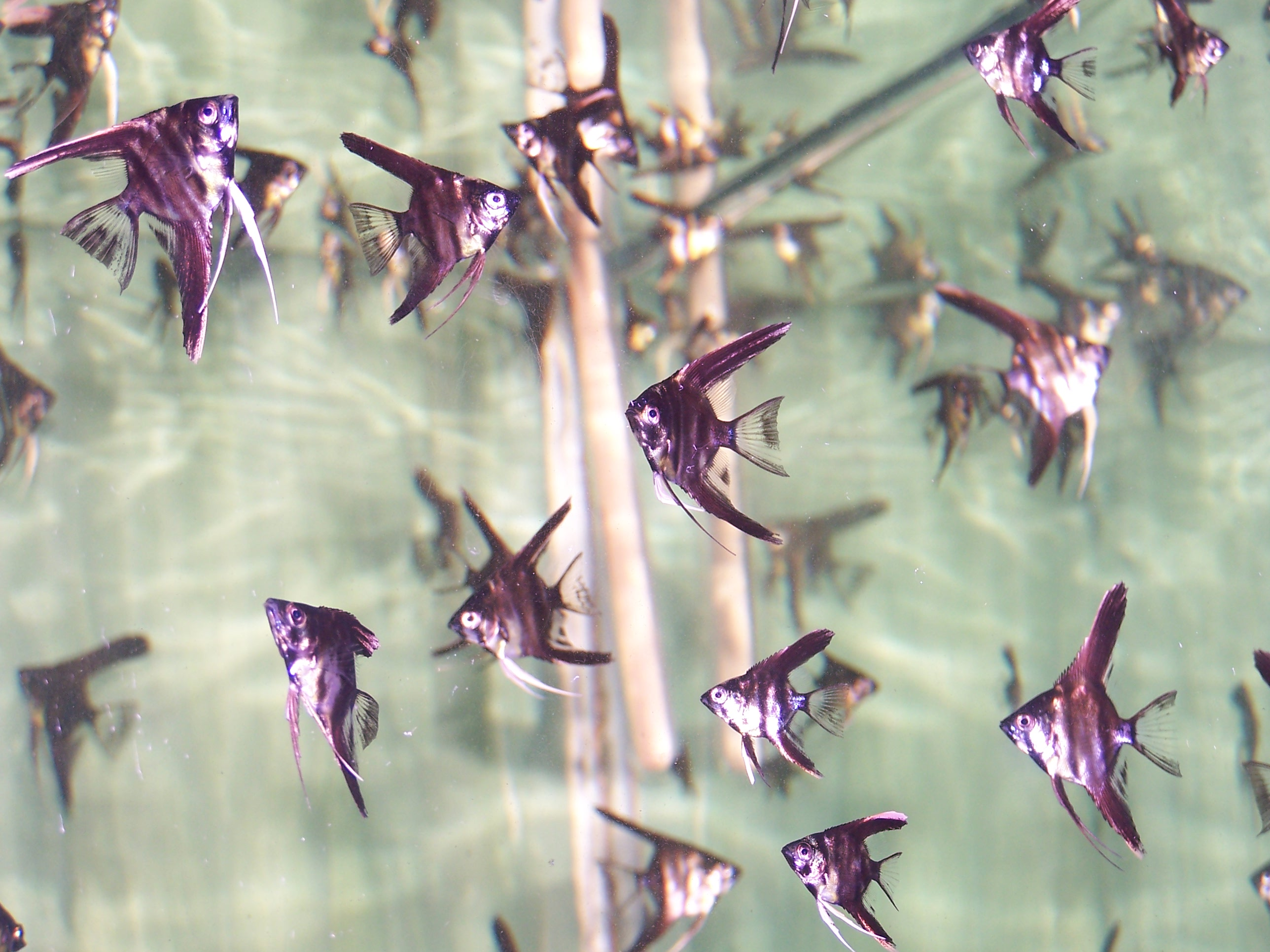
The angelfish (Pterophyllum scalare) has long been commercially bred for the aquarium trade.

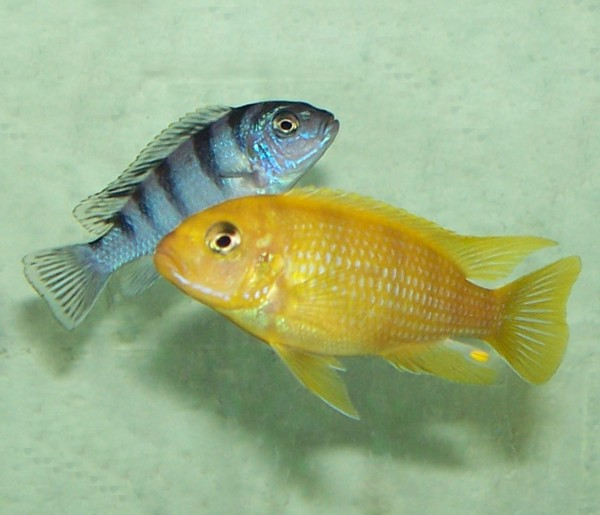
Sexual dimorphism is common in cichlids. Shown here are a male (front, with egg spots) and a female (rear) Maylandia lombardoi.

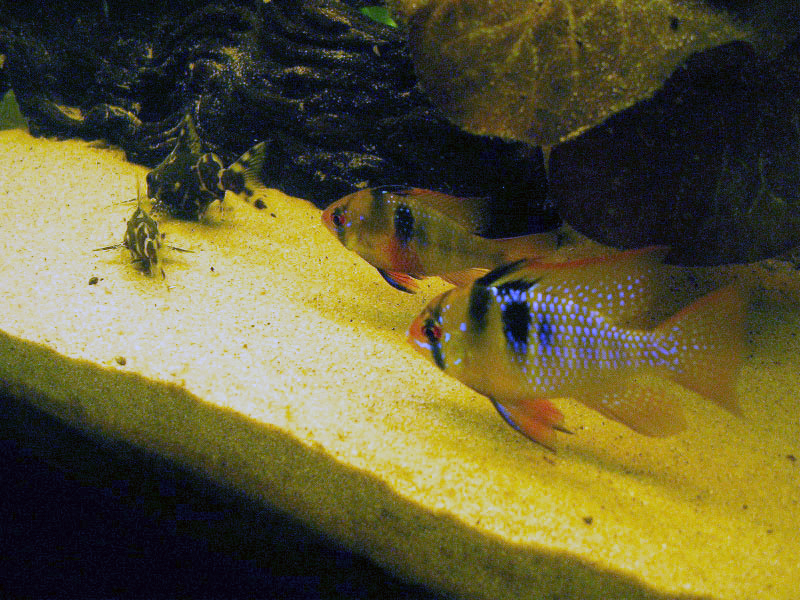
A pair of blue rams (Mikrogeophagus ramirezi), male in front, female behind. Many cichlids form strong pair bonds while breeding.

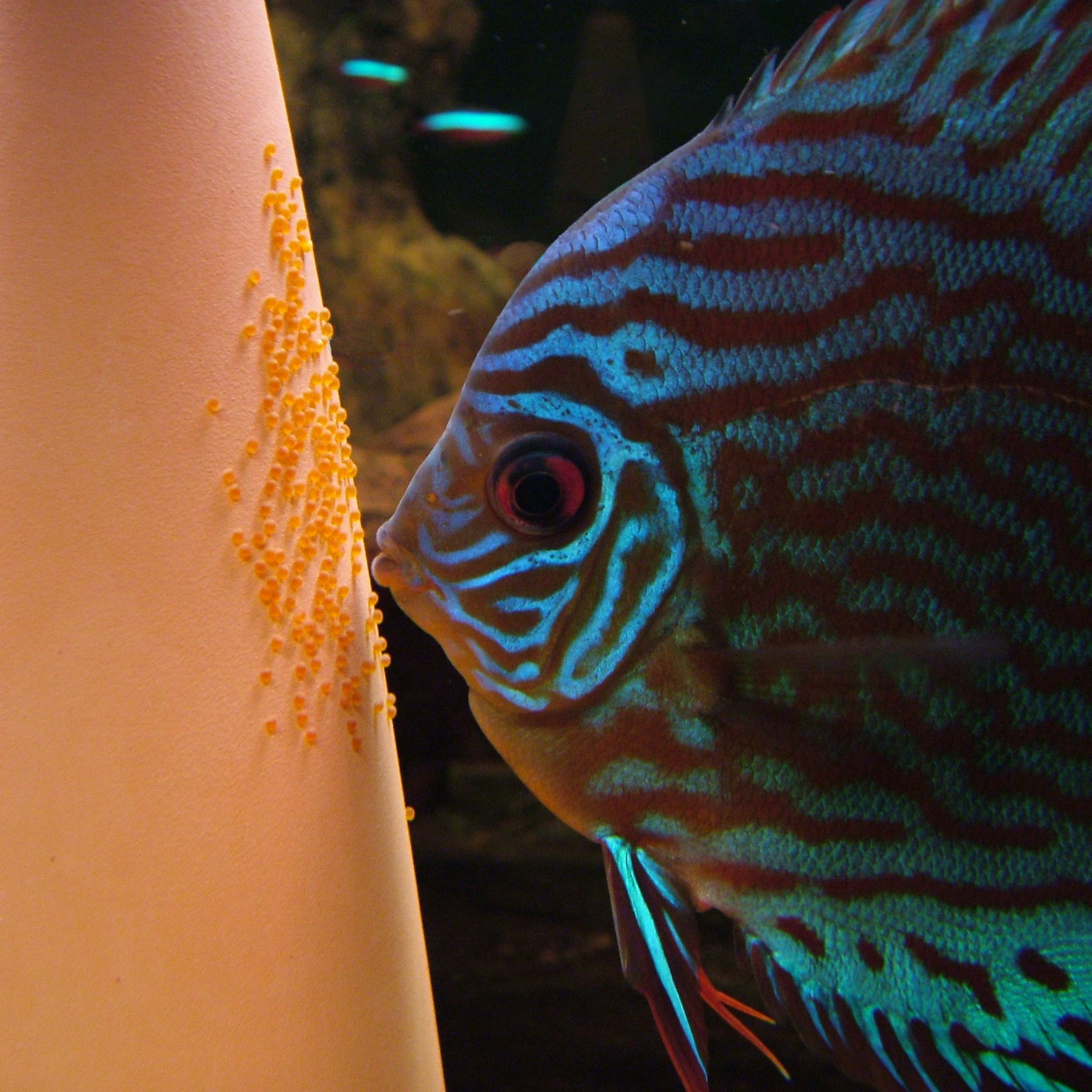
A discus (Symphysodon spp.) is guarding its eggs. Advanced broodcare is one of the defining characteristics of cichlids.

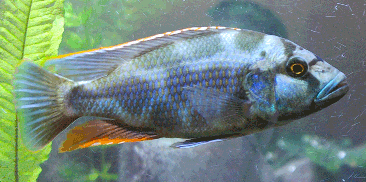
Lake Malawi, Eastern Africa, is home to numerous cichild species including this Livingston's cichlid (Nimbochromis livingstonii).

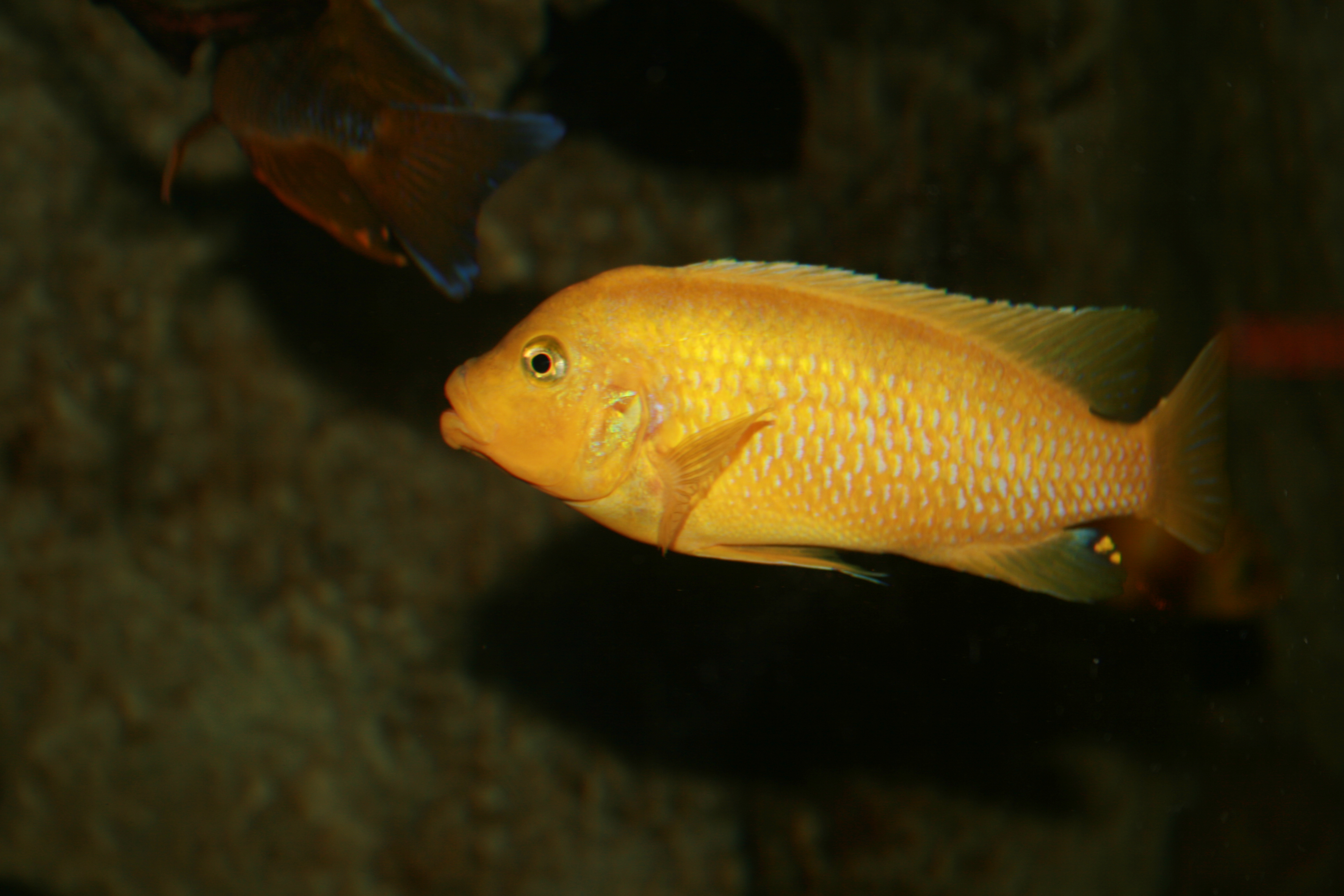
Also from Lake Malawi

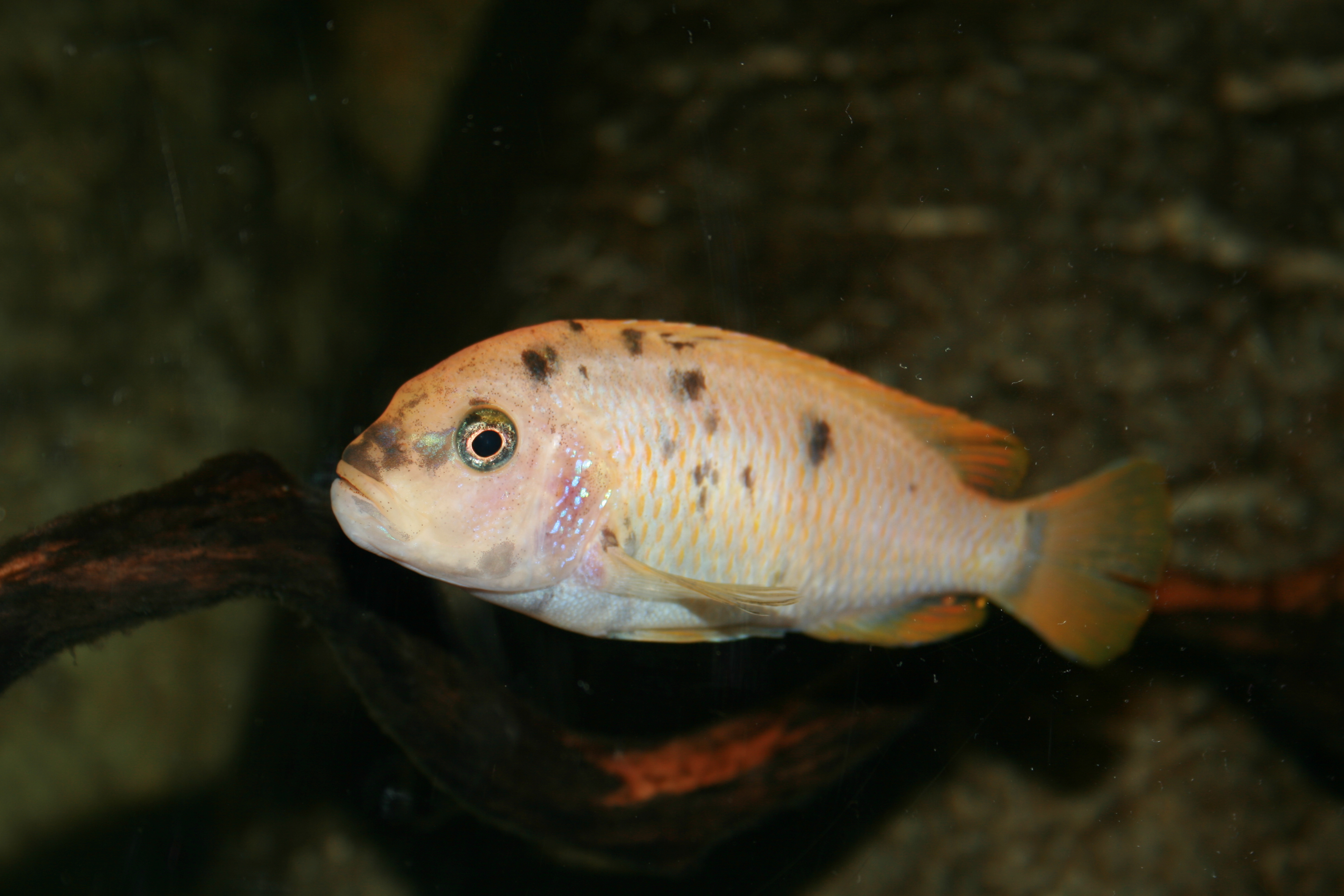
Also from Lake Malawi

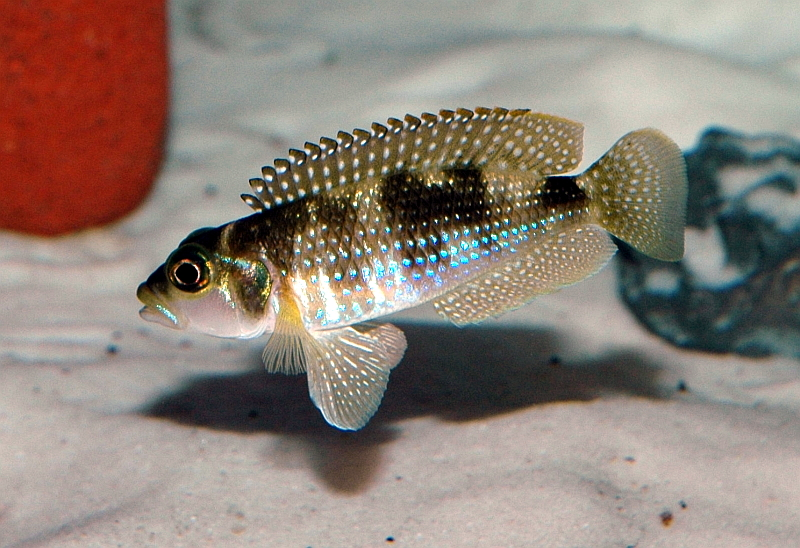
A shell-brooding cichlid of the genus Lamprologus from Lake Tanganyika in East Africa

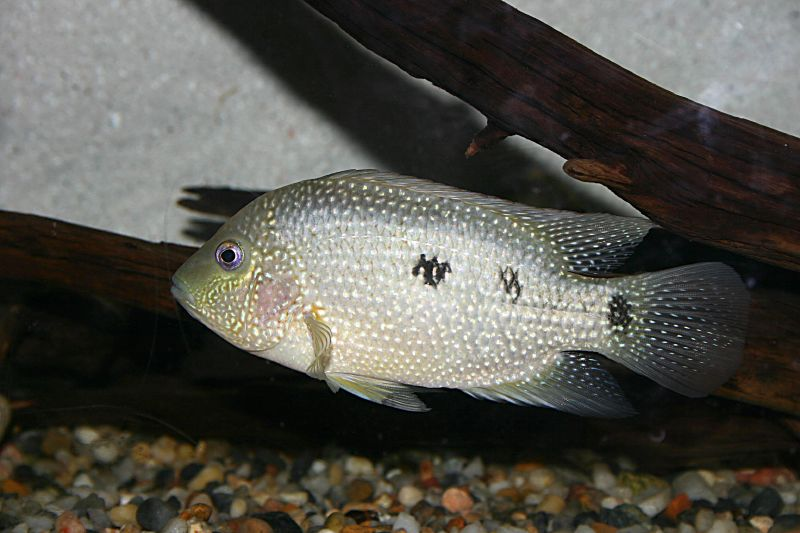
The Texas cichlid (Herichthys cyanoguttatus) is the only cichlid native to the United States.

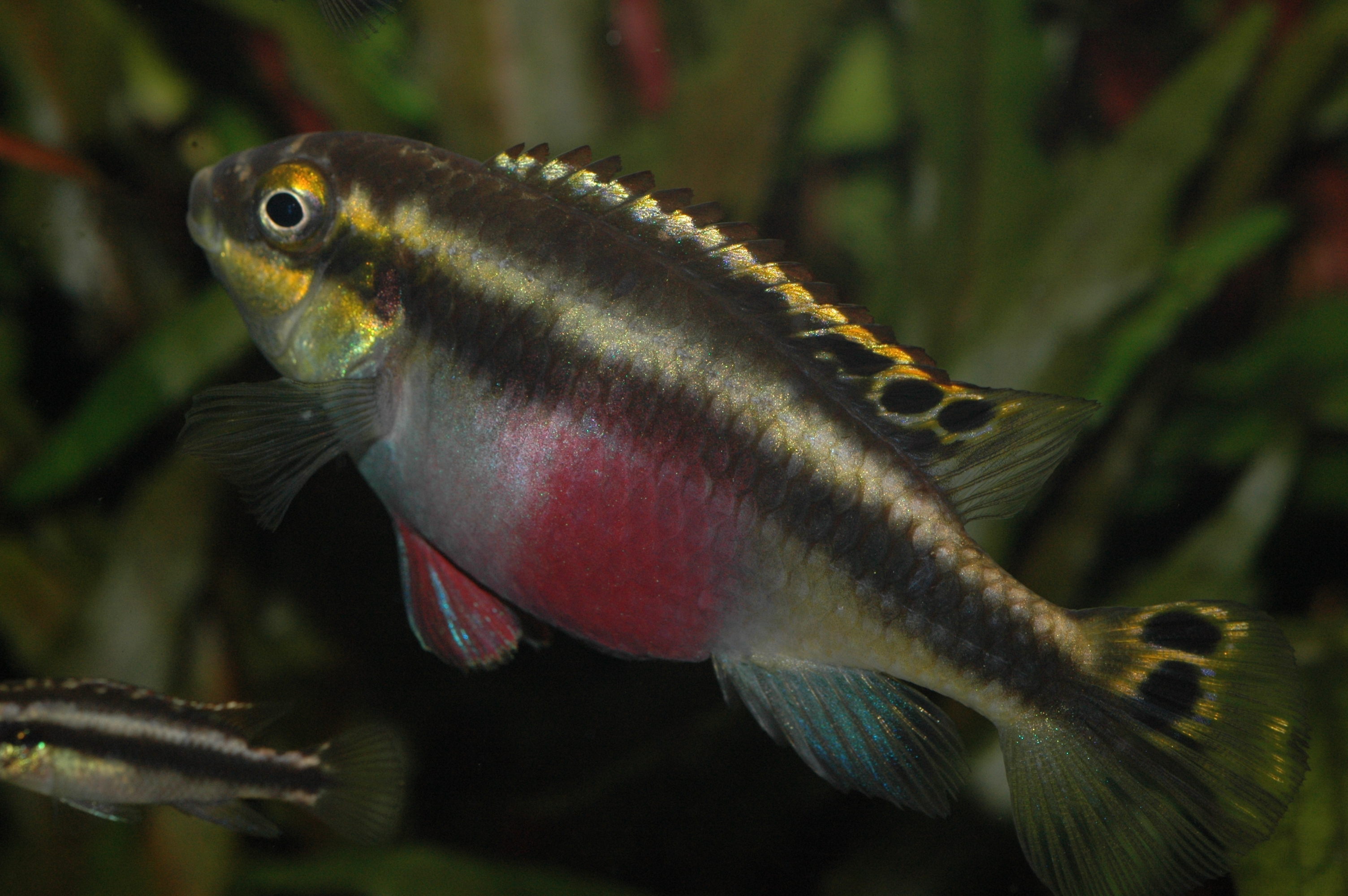
Pelvicachromis pulcher is a West African riverine cichlid, and part of the aquarists dwarf cichlid group.

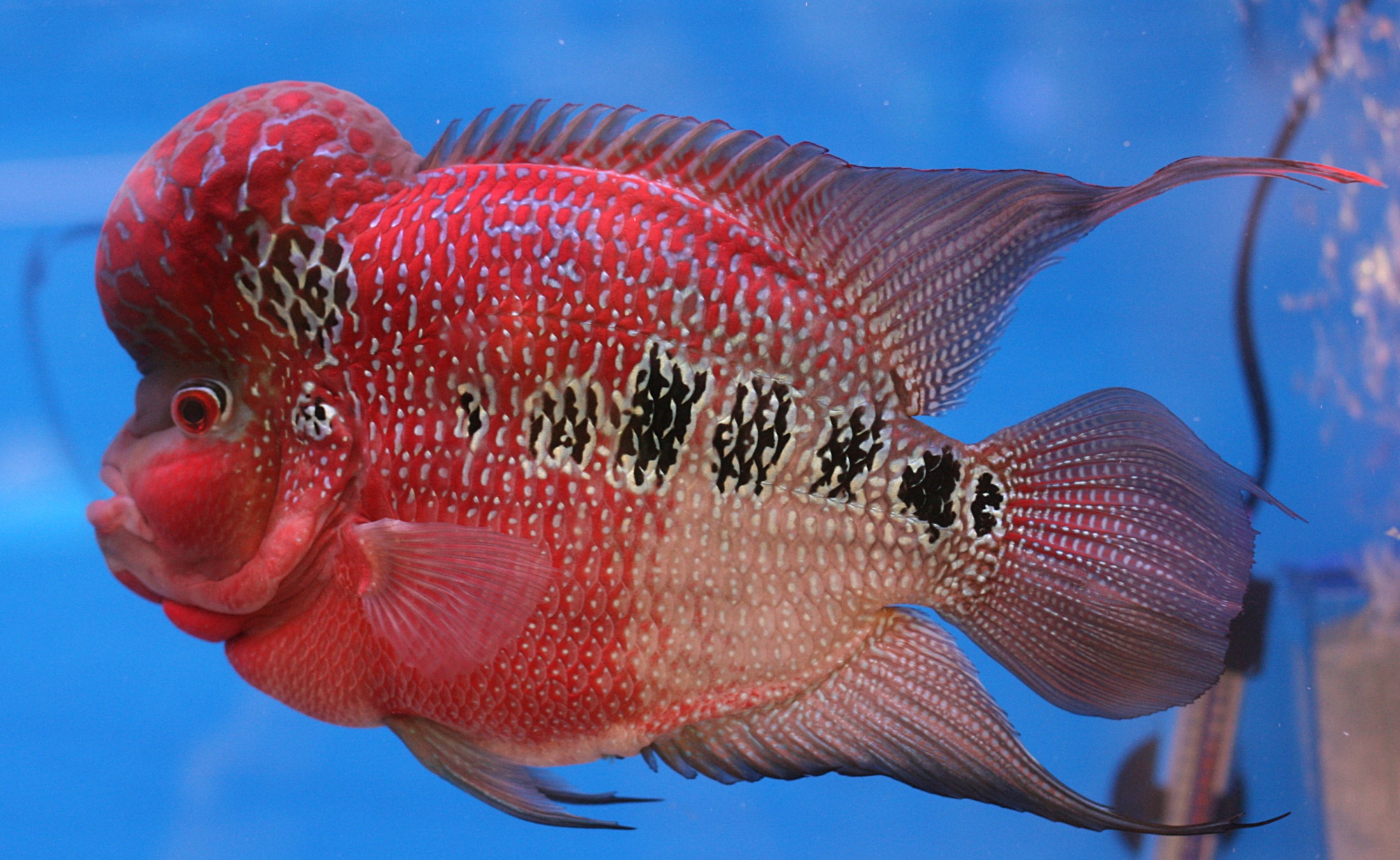
The flowerhorn cichlid is a man-made hybrid that has recently gained popularity among aquarists, particularly in Asia.

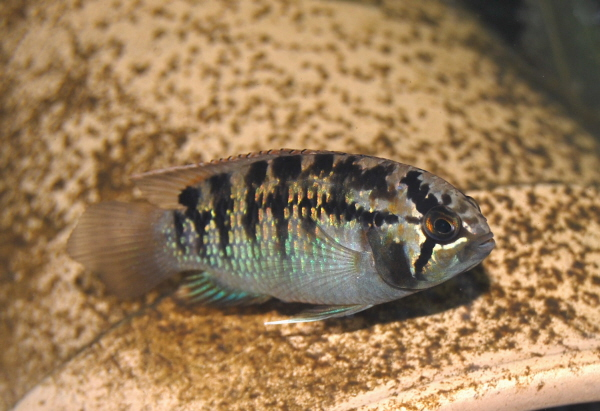
Ivanacara adoketa, a dwarf cichlid from Brazil

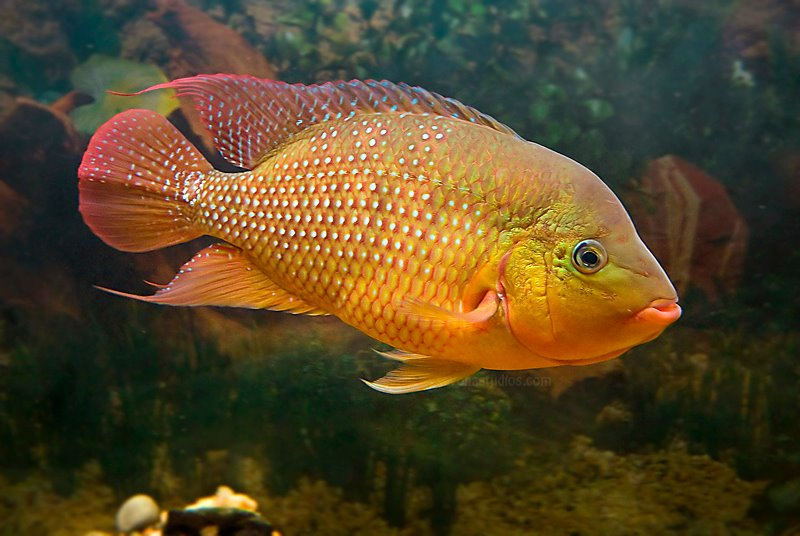
The red terror cichlid is a highly aggressive species from the rivers of Northeast South America.

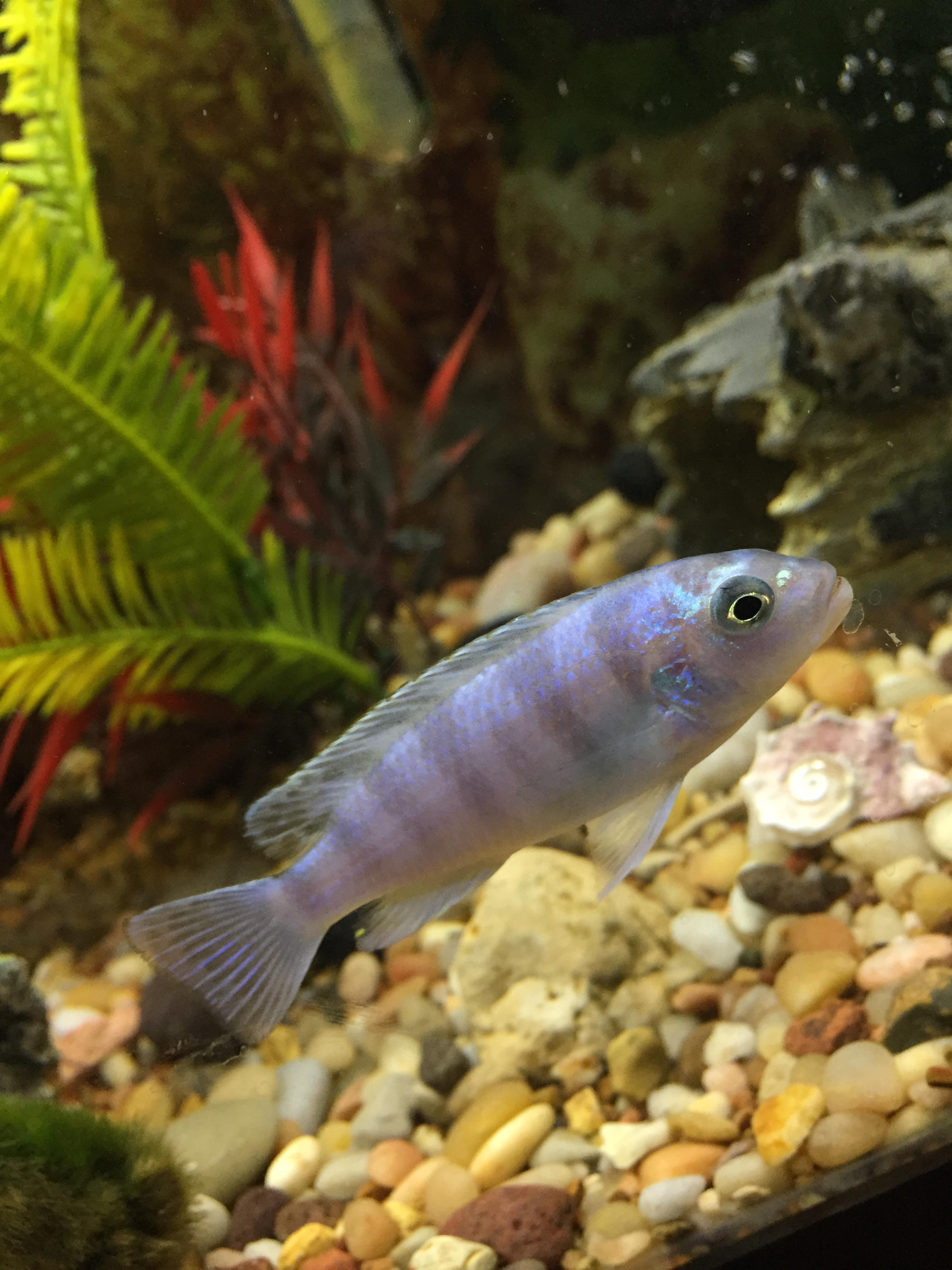
A juvenile female Maylandia lombardoi with faint stripes

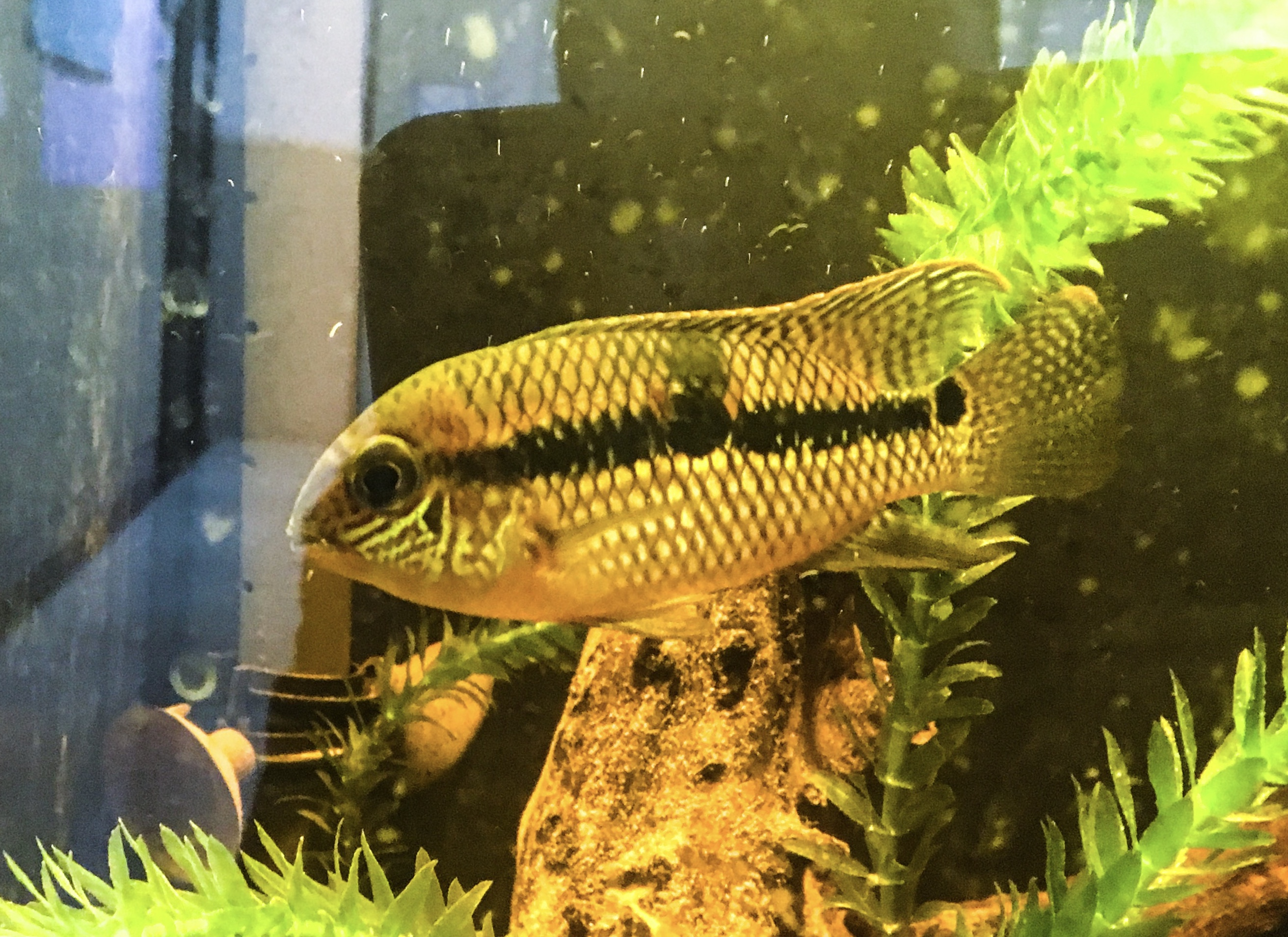
A juvenile Aequidens diadema
