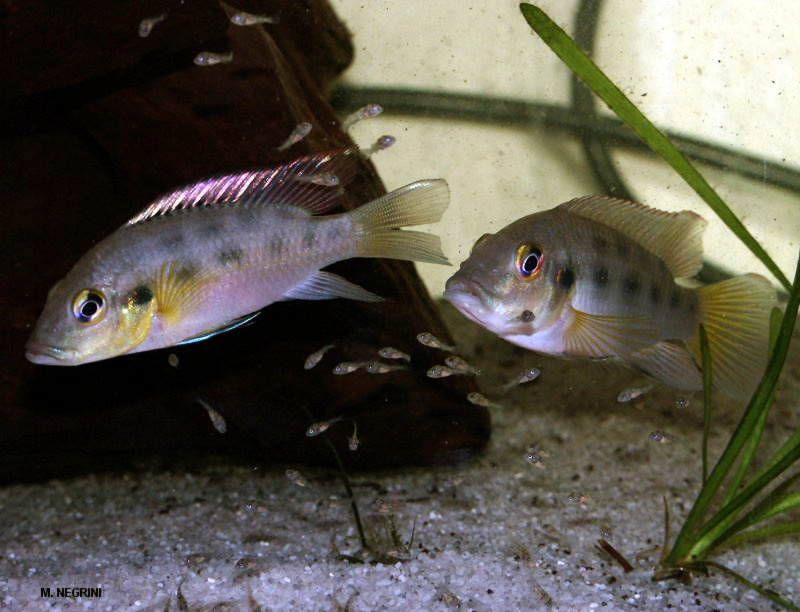
- Günther's mouthbrooder (C. guntheri) pair with fry, female on left

Scientific classification
- Kingdom: Animalia
- Phylum: Chordata
- Class: Actinopterygii
- Order: Cichliformes
- Family: Cichlidae
- Subfamily: Pseudocrenilabrinae
- Tribe: Chromidotilapiini
- Genus: Chromidotilapia; Boulenger, 1898

Type species
- Chromidotilapia kingsleyae Boulenger, 1898

= Chromidotilapia =

Genus of fishes

Chromidotilapia is a genus of cichlid fishes. The genus contains 11 species. Of these, 9 are from Central Africa, one (C. guentheri) is found from Liberia to Cameroon, while the remaining species (C. cavalliensis) is restricted to Côte d'Ivoire.

== Species ==
There are currently 11 recognized species in this genus:

- Chromidotilapia cavalliensis (Thys van den Audenaerde & Loiselle, 1971)
- Chromidotilapia elongata Lamboj, 1999
- Chromidotilapia guntheri (Sauvage, 1882) (Günther's mouthbrooder)
- Chromidotilapia kingsleyae Boulenger, 1898
- Chromidotilapia linkei Staeck, 1980
- Chromidotilapia mamonekenei Lamboj, 1999
- Chromidotilapia melaniae Lamboj, 2003
- Chromidotilapia mrac Lamboj, 2002
- Chromidotilapia nana Lamboj, 2003
- Chromidotilapia regani (Pellegrin, 1906)
- Chromidotilapia schoutedeni (Poll & Thys van den Audenaerde, 1967)
