= H. flavus =

H. flavus may refer to:

- Haplochromis flavus, a fish species endemic to Tanzania
- Helius flavus, a species of fly in the family Limoniidae
- Hemignathus flavus, the oʻahu ʻamakihi, a bird species found in Hawaii
- Hyalobagrus flavus, a catfish species

== See also ==
- Flavus (disambiguation)
