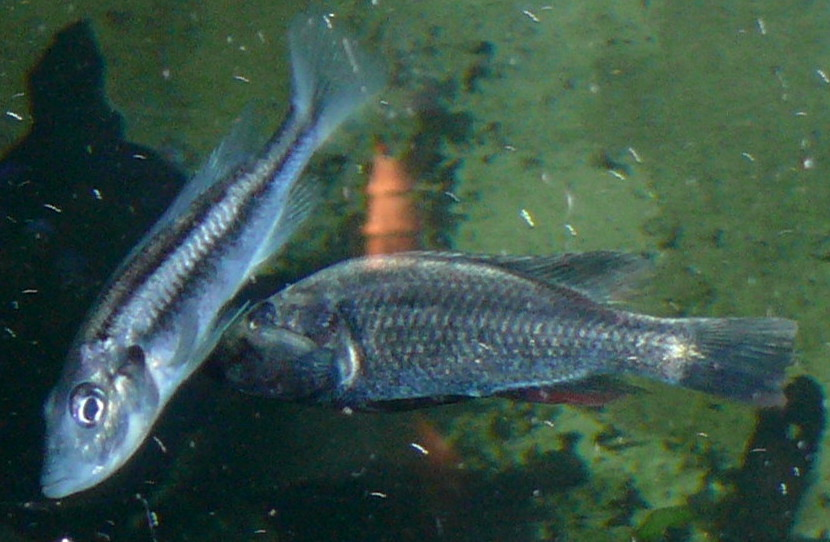
- Haplochromis thereuterion

Scientific classification
- Kingdom: Animalia
- Phylum: Chordata
- Class: Actinopterygii
- Division: Teleostei
- Order: Cichliformes
- Family: Cichlidae
- Subfamily: Pseudocrenilabrinae
- Genus: Haplochromis; Hilgendorf, 1888

Type species
- Chromis obliquidens Hilgendorf, 1888

Synonyms
- Many, see text

= Haplochromis =

Genus of fishes

Haplochromis is a ray-finned fish genus in the family Cichlidae. It has been used as the default "wastebin taxon" for Pseudocrenilabrinae cichlids of the East African Rift, and as such became the "largest" fish "genus". Many of these cichlids are popular aquarium fishes; like similar Haplochromini they are known as "haplos", "happies" or "haps" among aquarium enthusiasts.

The genus was established by F.M. Hilgendorf in 1888. It was originally conceived as a subgenus of A.C.L.G. Günther's "Chromis", at that time an even larger "wastebin genus" for Pseudocrenilabrinae cichlids. The type species of Hilgendorf was H. obliquidens. "Chromis" of Günther turned out to be a junior homonym of G. Cuvier's ocean fish genus Chromis, already established in 1814, and was abolished. As the years went by, other genera of (mostly) Haplochromini were lumped with and split again from Haplochromis, and the final delimitation of the clade around H. obliquidens is not yet done.

== Extinction crisis in Lake Victoria ==
The introduction of Nile perch (Lates niloticus) to Lake Victoria after 1954 severely upset the lake's ecosystem. By the late 1970s, the perch's population was approaching carrying capacity, and the smaller cichlids were fair game for the huge carnivorous Lates. The Nile tilapia (Oreochromis niloticus), an adaptable generalist, was also introduced and competed with the often specialized endemic cichlids of the lake for food and other resources. When the Nile perch stocks finally declined again in the late 1980s, an estimated 200 Haplochromini species (mostly Haplochromis) may have become extinct – many of these had only been scientifically described a few years before their demise, and additional ones were only known or suspected to exist, but never properly studied or described.

While the stocks of those species that survived are in many cases recovering, the lake ecosystem has changed irrevocably. The entire trophic web has been observed to be upset. But still, evolution runs its course: those Lake Victoria Haplochromis species that still exist are in many cases adapting to new food sources, and in time, speciation is likely to set in and produce a new adaptive radiation of these fishes. Until then, however, the ecological balance of the lake is still on the brink, and many of the cichlids that survived the peak population of Lates are still critically endangered and close to extinction.

== Systematics and taxonomy ==
Haplochromis is the type genus of the tribe Haplochromini. Most of the tribe's members were at one time or another included in the present genus, but in many cases this was only temporary. Around the year 1900, as well 100 years later, the trend was to split up the genus; especially in the mid-20th century, on the other hand, most authors lumped any and all Haplochromini that were not conspicuously distinct in the type genus.

While a number of African Rift Valley cichlids are certainly very close relatives of H. obliquidens, the type species of the present genus, it is not very clear where to draw the boundary of Haplochromis with regard to its relatives. Still, several genera are now recognized as distinct by many authors and scientific databases, such as FishBase (see below); in particular the Haplochromini from Lake Tanganyika and Lake Malawi are usually removed from Haplochromis. The genus delimitation in the entire tribe remains badly resolved, however, and further changes in taxonomy are likely in the future. In particular, between Haplochromis, Astatotilapia and Thoracochromis, species have been moved to and from over the years. The habit of Pseudocrenilabrinae to hybridize is hampering molecular phylogenetic studies based on mtDNA alone, while trophic morphs of a single species may appear to be distinct "species" if they are not phylogenetically studied. Several proposed genera are again included in Haplochromis at present, but it cannot be ruled out that some of these will eventually be recognized as valid again.

== Species ==
There are currently 227 recognized species in this genus:

- Haplochromis acidens Greenwood, 1967
- Haplochromis adolphifrederici (Boulenger, 1914)
- Haplochromis aelocephalus Greenwood, 1959
- Haplochromis aeneocolor Greenwood, 1973
- Haplochromis akika Lippitsch, 2003
- Haplochromis albertianus Regan, 1929
- Haplochromis altigenis Regan, 1922
- Haplochromis ampullarostratus Schraml, 2004
- Haplochromis angustifrons Boulenger, 1914
- Haplochromis annectidens Trewavas, 1933
- Haplochromis antleter Mietes & F. Witte, 2010
- Haplochromis apogonoides Greenwood, 1967
- Haplochromis aquila Vranken, van Steenberge, Heylen, Decru & Snoeks, 2022
- Haplochromis arcanus Greenwood & Gee, 1969
- Haplochromis argens de Zeeuw, Westbroek & F. Witte, 2013
- Haplochromis argenteus Regan, 1922
- Haplochromis artaxerxes Greenwood, 1962
- Haplochromis astatodon Regan, 1921
- Haplochromis avium Regan, 1929 (incertae sedis)
- Haplochromis bakongo Thys van den Audenaerde, 1964
- Haplochromis barbarae Greenwood, 1967
- Haplochromis bareli van Oijen, 1991
- Haplochromis bartoni Greenwood, 1962
- Haplochromis bayoni Boulenger, 1909
- Haplochromis beadlei Trewavas, 1933
- Haplochromis bicolor Boulenger, 1906
- Haplochromis boops Greenwood, 1967
- Haplochromis brauschi Poll & Thys van den Audenaerde, 1965
- Haplochromis brownae Greenwood, 1962
- Haplochromis bullatus Trewavas, 1938
- Haplochromis bwathondii Niemantsverdriet & F. Witte, 2010
- Haplochromis callichromus (Poll, 1948)
- Haplochromis cassius Greenwood & Barel, 1978
- Haplochromis cavifrons Hilgendorf, 1888
- Haplochromis chilotes Boulenger, 1911
- Haplochromis chlorochrous Greenwood & Gee, 1969
- Haplochromis chromogynos Greenwood, 1959
- Haplochromis chrysogynaion van Oijen, 1991
- Haplochromis cinctus Greenwood & Gee, 1969
- Haplochromis cinereus Boulenger, 1906
- Haplochromis cnester F. Witte & Witte-Maas, 1981
- Haplochromis commutabilis Schraml, 2004 (Kachira blue)
- Haplochromis coprologus Niemantsverdriet & F. Witte, 2010
- Haplochromis crassilabris Boulenger, 1906
- Haplochromis crebridens Snoeks, De Vos, Coenen & Thys van den Audenaerde, 1990
- Haplochromis crocopeplus Greenwood & Barel, 1978
- Haplochromis cronus Greenwood, 1959
- Haplochromis cryptodon Greenwood, 1959
- Haplochromis cryptogramma Greenwood & Gee, 1969
- Haplochromis cyaneus Seehausen, Bouton & Zwennes, 1998
- Haplochromis decticostoma Greenwood & Gee, 1969
- Haplochromis degeni Boulenger, 1906
- Haplochromis demeusii (Boulenger, 1899)
- Haplochromis dentex Regan, 1922
- Haplochromis dichrourus Regan, 1922
- Haplochromis diplotaenia Regan & Trewavas, 1928
- Haplochromis dolichorhynchus Greenwood & Gee, 1969
- Haplochromis dolorosus Trewavas, 1933
- Haplochromis eduardianus Boulenger, 1914
- Haplochromis eduardii Regan, 1921
- Haplochromis elegans Trewavas, 1933
- Haplochromis empodisma Greenwood, 1960
- Haplochromis engystoma Trewavas, 1933
- Haplochromis erythrocephalus Greenwood & Gee, 1969
- Haplochromis erythromaculatus De Vos, Snoeks & Thys van den Audenaerde, 1991
- Haplochromis estor Regan, 1929
- Haplochromis eutaenia Regan & Trewavas, 1928
- Haplochromis exspectatus Schraml, 2004
- Haplochromis fasciatus (Perugia, 1892)
- Haplochromis fischeri Seegers, 2008
- Haplochromis flavipinnis Boulenger, 1906
- Haplochromis flavus Seehausen, Zwennes & Lippitsch, 1998
- Haplochromis fuelleborni Hilgendorf & Pappenheim, 1903 (Fuelleborn's mouthbrooder)
- Haplochromis fuscus Regan, 1925
- Haplochromis fusiformis Greenwood & Gee, 1969
- Haplochromis gigliolii Pfeffer, 1896
- Haplochromis gilberti Greenwood & Gee, 1969
- Haplochromis goldschmidti F. Witte, Westbroek & de Zeeuw, 2013
- Haplochromis gowersii Trewavas, 1928
- Haplochromis gracilior Boulenger, 1914 (Torpedostripe haplochromis)
- Haplochromis granti Boulenger, 1906
- Haplochromis graueri Boulenger, 1914
- Haplochromis guiarti Pellegrin, 1904
- Haplochromis harpakteridion van Oijen, 1991
- Haplochromis heusinkveldi F. Wittee & Witte-Maas, 1987
- Haplochromis hiatus Hoogerhoud & F. Witte, 1981
- Haplochromis howesi van Oijen, 1992
- Haplochromis humilior Boulenger, 1911
- Haplochromis humilis Steindachner, 1866
- Haplochromis insidiae Snoeks, 1994
- Haplochromis iris Hoogerhoud & F. Witte, 1981
- Haplochromis ishmaeli Boulenger, 1906
- Haplochromis kamiranzovu Snoeks, Coenen & Thys van den Audenaerde, 1984
- Haplochromis katavi Seegers, 1996 (Katavi mouthbrooder)
- Haplochromis katonga Schraml & Tichy, 2010
- Haplochromis katunzii ter Huurne & F. Witte, 2010
- Haplochromis kujunjui van Oijen, 1991
- Haplochromis labiatus Trewavas, 1933
- Haplochromis labriformis Nichols & La Monte, 1938
- Haplochromis lacrimosus Boulenger, 1906
- Haplochromis laparogramma Greenwood & Gee, 1969
- Haplochromis latifasciatus Regan, 1929
- Haplochromis limax Trewavas, 1933
- Haplochromis lividus Greenwood, 1956
- Haplochromis loati Greenwood, 1971
- Haplochromis longirostris Hilgendorf, 1888
- Haplochromis luluae (Fowler, 1930
- Haplochromis luteus Seehausen & Bouton, 1998
- Haplochromis macconneli Greenwood, 1974
- Haplochromis macrognathus Regan, 1922
- Haplochromis macrops Boulenger, 1911
- Haplochromis macropsoides Greenwood, 1973
- Haplochromis maculipinna Pellegrin, 1913
- Haplochromis mahagiensis L. R. David & Poll, 1937
- Haplochromis maisomei van Oijen, 1991
- Haplochromis malacophagus Poll & Damas, 1939
- Haplochromis mandibularis Greenwood, 1962
- Haplochromis martini Boulenger, 1906
- Haplochromis maxillaris Trewavas, 1928
- Haplochromis megalops Greenwood & Gee, 1969
- Haplochromis melanopterus Trewavas, 1928
- Haplochromis melanopus Regan, 1922
- Haplochromis melichrous Greenwood & Gee, 1969
- Haplochromis mentatus Regan, 1925
- Haplochromis mento Regan, 1922
- Haplochromis michaeli Trewavas, 1928
- Haplochromis microchrysomelas Snoeks, 1994
- Haplochromis microdon Boulenger, 1906
- Haplochromis moeruensis (Boulenger, 1899)
- Haplochromis multiocellatus Boulenger, 1913
- Haplochromis mylergates Greenwood & Barel, 1978
- Haplochromis mylodon Greenwood, 1973
- Haplochromis nanoserranus Greenwood & Barel, 1978
- Haplochromis nigrescens Pellegrin, 1909
- Haplochromis nigripinnis Regan, 1921
- Haplochromis nigroides Pellegrin, 1928
- Haplochromis niloticus Greenwood, 1960
- Haplochromis nubilus Boulenger, 1906 (Blue Victoria mouthbrooder)
- Haplochromis nuchisquamulatus Hilgendorf, 1888
- Haplochromis nyanzae Greenwood, 1962
- Haplochromis obesus Boulenger, 1906
- Haplochromis obliquidens Hilgendorf, 1888
- Haplochromis obtusidens Trewavas, 1928
- Haplochromis occultidens Snoeks, 1988
- Haplochromis oligolepis Lippitsch, 2003
- Haplochromis olivaceus Snoeks, De Vos, Coenen & Thys van den Audenaerde, 1990
- Haplochromis oregosoma Greenwood, 1973
- Haplochromis orthostoma Regan, 1922
- Haplochromis pachycephalus Greenwood, 1967
- Haplochromis pallidus Boulenger, 1911
- Haplochromis paludinosus (Greenwood, 1980)f
- Haplochromis pancitrinus Mietes & F. Witte, 2010
- Haplochromis pappenheimi Boulenger, 1914
- Haplochromis paradoxus Lippitsch & Kaufman, 2003
- Haplochromis paraguiarti Greenwood, 1967
- Haplochromis paraplagiostoma Greenwood & Gee, 1969
- Haplochromis paropius Greenwood & Gee, 1969
- Haplochromis parorthostoma Greenwood, 1967
- Haplochromis parvidens Boulenger, 1911
- Haplochromis paucidens Regan, 1921
- Haplochromis pellegrini Regan, 1922
- Haplochromis percoides Boulenger, 1906
- Haplochromis perrieri Pellegrin, 1909
- Haplochromis petronius Greenwood, 1973
- Haplochromis pharyngalis Poll & Damas, 1939
- Haplochromis pharyngomylus Regan, 1929
- Haplochromis phytophagus Greenwood, 1966
- Haplochromis piceatus Greenwood & Gee, 1969
- Haplochromis pitmani Fowler, 1936
- Haplochromis placodus Poll & Damas, 1939
- Haplochromis plagiodon Regan & Trewavas, 1928
- Haplochromis plagiostoma Regan, 1922
- Haplochromis plutonius Greenwood & Barel, 1978
- Haplochromis prodromus Trewavas, 1935
- Haplochromis prognathus Pellegrin, 1904
- Haplochromis pseudopellegrini Greenwood, 1967
- Haplochromis ptistes Greenwood & Barel, 1978
- Haplochromis pyrrhocephalus F. Witte & Witte-Maas, 1987
- Haplochromis pyrrhopteryx van Oijen, 1991
- Haplochromis retrodens Hilgendorf, 1888
- Haplochromis riponianus Boulenger, 1911
- Haplochromis rubescens Snoeks, 1994
- Haplochromis rudolfianus Trewavas, 1933
- Haplochromis sauvagei Pfeffer, 1896
- Haplochromis saxicola Greenwood, 1960
- Haplochromis scheffersi Snoeks, De Vos & Thys van den Audenaerde, 1987
- Haplochromis schubotzi Boulenger, 1914
- Haplochromis schubotziellus Greenwood, 1973
- Haplochromis schwetzi Poll, 1967
- Haplochromis serranus Pfeffer, 1896
- Haplochromis serridens Regan, 1925
- Haplochromis simpsoni Greenwood, 1965
- Haplochromis smithii Castelnau, 1861
- Haplochromis snoeksi Wamuini Lunkayilakio & Vreven, 2010
- Haplochromis spekii Boulenger, 1906
- Haplochromis sphex ter Huurne & F. Witte, 2010
- Haplochromis squamipinnis Regan, 1921
- Haplochromis squamulatus Regan, 1922
- Haplochromis stigmatogenys (Boulenger, 1913)
- Haplochromis sulphureus Greenwood & Barel, 1978
- Haplochromis tanaos van Oijen & F. Witte, 1996
- Haplochromis taurinus Trewavas, 1933
- Haplochromis teegelaari Greenwood & Barel, 1978
- Haplochromis teunisrasi F. Witte & Witte-Maas, 1981
- Haplochromis theliodon Greenwood, 1960
- Haplochromis thereuterion van Oijen & F. Witte, 1996
- Haplochromis thuragnathus Greenwood, 1967
- Haplochromis tridens Regan & Trewavas, 1928
- Haplochromis turkanae Greenwood, 1974 (Turkana haplo)
- Haplochromis tyrianthinus Greenwood & Gee, 1969
- Haplochromis ushindi van Oijen, 2004
- Haplochromis vanheusdeni F. D. B. Schedel, Friel & U. K. Schliewen, 2014
- Haplochromis vanoijeni de Zeeuw & F. Witte, 2010
- Haplochromis velifer Trewavas, 1933
- Haplochromis venator Greenwood, 1965
- Haplochromis vicarius Trewavas, 1933
- Haplochromis victoriae Greenwood, 1956
- Haplochromis victorianus Pellegrin, 1904
- Haplochromis vittatus Boulenger, 1901
- Haplochromis vonlinnei van Oijen & de Zeeuw, 2008
- Haplochromis welcommei Greenwood, 1966
- Haplochromis worthingtoni Regan, 1929
- Haplochromis xenognathus Greenwood, 1957
- Haplochromis xenostoma Regan, 1922

=== Undescribed species ===
These populations are typically referred to by the names they have in the aquarium fish trade. A number of them are likely to represent undescribed distinct species; others might just be subspecies or color morphs. Whether they all belong in Haplochromis is, of course, doubtful. Some of these populations are:

- Haplochromis sp. '75'
- Haplochromis sp. 'Amboseli'
- Haplochromis sp. 'backflash cryptodon'
- Haplochromis sp. 'black cryptodon'
- Haplochromis sp. 'Chala'
- Haplochromis sp. 'dusky wine-red fin'
- Haplochromis sp. 'frogmouth'
- Haplochromis sp. 'Kyoga flameback'
- Haplochromis sp. 'long snout'
- Haplochromis sp. 'Migori'
- Haplochromis sp. 'nigrofasciatus'
- Haplochromis sp. 'parvidens-like'
- Haplochromis sp. 'purple head'
- Haplochromis sp. 'ruby'
- Haplochromis sp. 'Rusinga oral sheller'
- Haplochromis sp. 'rainbow sheller'
- Haplochromis sp. 'small obesoid'

=== Formerly in Haplochromis ===
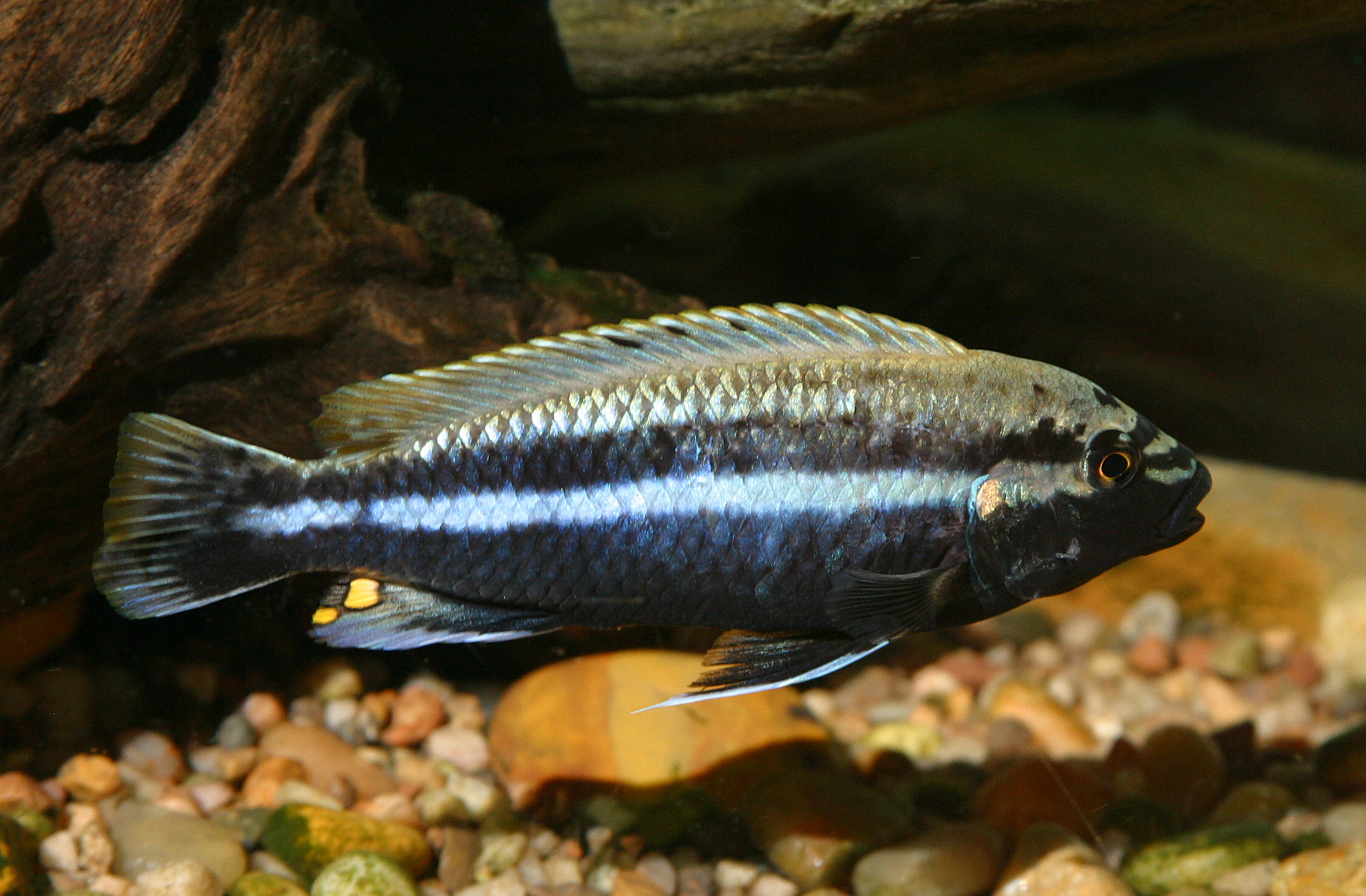
Adult male Golden Mbuna (Melanochromis auratus)

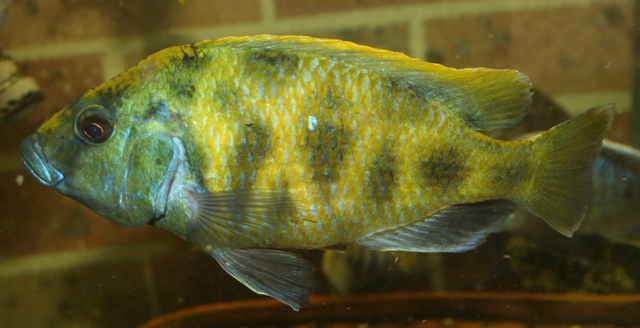
Giraffe Hap (Nimbochromis venustus)

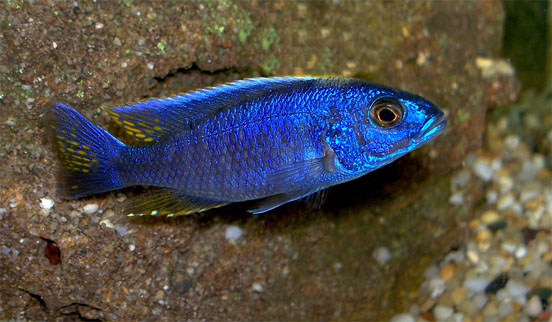
Adult male Sciaenochromis fryeri

Among other genera of Haplochromini that were formerly included here, many are small or monotypic. The distinctness of these is highly doubtful, as they may just be distinct lineages of Haplochromis or other haplochromines. That nonwithstanding, Haplochromini genera to which some former "Haplochromis" have been removed are in particular:

- Astatoreochromis (3 species)
- Astatotilapia (9 described species)
- Aulonocara (22 species)
- Buccochromis (7 species)
- Caprichromis (2 species)
- Champsochromis (2 species)
- Cheilochromis (monotypic)
- Chetia (6 species)
- Copadichromis (25 described species)
- Ctenochromis (2 species)
- Ctenopharynx (3 species)
- Cyrtocara (monotypic)
- Dimidiochromis (4 species)
- Eclectochromis (2 species)
- Fossorochromis (monotypic)
- Hemitaeniochromis (monotypic)
- Lethrinops (24 species)
- Lithochromis (3 species)
- Maylandia/Metriaclima (25 species)
- Mbipia (2 species)
- Mchenga (6 species)
- Melanochromis (27 species)
- Mylochromis (21 species)
- Naevochromis (monotypic)
- Neochromis (6 species)
- Nimbochromis (5 species)
- Nyassachromis (8 species)
- Orthochromis (14 species)
- Otopharynx (13 species)
- Pharyngochromis (2 species)
- Placidochromis (43 species)
- Protomelas (15 species)
- Pundamilia (5 species)
- Pseudocrenilabrus (3 species)
- Sargochromis (8 species)
- Schwetzochromis (monotypic)
- Sciaenochromis (4 species)
- Shuja (monotypic)
- Stigmatochromis (4 species)
- Taeniochromis (monotypic)
- Taeniolethrinops (4 species)
- Thoracochromis (4 species)
- Tramitichromis (5 species)
- Trematocranus (3 species)
- Tyrannochromis (4 species)

Some other Pseudocrenilabrinae were also – mainly by early authors – included in Haplochromis, though they are not members of its tribe. These are:

- Anomalochromis thomasi of the Hemichromini
- Altolamprologus compressiceps of the Lamprologini
- Tilapia jallae of the Tilapiini

=== Synonyms of Haplochromis ===
With all the taxonomic and systematic confusion affecting Haplochromis and its allies, it is hardly surprising that the genus has a large number of junior synonyms. Most referred to small or monotypic genera that were once considered distinct, but are now included in Haplochromis again, if only to wait for a major review of their status. Synonyms are:

- Allochromis Greenwood, 1980
- Cleptochromis Greenwood, 1980
- Enterochromis Greenwood, 1980
- Gaurochromis Greenwood, 1980
- Harpagochromis Greenwood, 1980
- Labrochromis Regan, 1920
- Lipochromis Regan, 1920
- Platytaeniodus Boulenger, 1906
- Prognathochromis Greenwood, 1980
- Ptyochromis Greenwood, 1980
- Psammochromis Greenwood, 1980
- Tridontochromis Greenwood, 1980
- Xystichromis Greenwood, 1980
- Yssichromis Greenwood, 1980

Sometimes other genera listed above are also synonymized.
