= H. microdon =

H. microdon may refer to:

- Haplochromis microdon, a fish species endemic to Tanzania
- Hyaenodon microdon, an extinct mammal species

== See also ==
- Microdon disambiguation
