= Haplochromis scheffersi =

Conservation status
- Least Concern (IUCN 3.1)

Scientific classification
- Kingdom: Animalia
- Phylum: Chordata
- Class: Actinopterygii
- Order: Cichliformes
- Family: Cichlidae
- Genus: Haplochromis
- Species: H. scheffersi

Binomial name
- Haplochromis scheffersi Snoeks, De Vos & Thys van den Audenaerde, 1987

Species of fish

Haplochromis scheffersi is a species of cichlid endemic to Lake Kivu on the border of the Democratic Republic of the Congo and Rwanda. This species reaches a length of 8.5 centimetres (3.3 in) SL. The specific name of this species honours W. Scheffers who was the Director of the FAO Project for Fisheries Development at Lake Kivu when the authors were collecting at that lake.
