= Mbipia =

Scientific classification
- Kingdom: Animalia
- Phylum: Chordata
- Class: Actinopterygii
- Order: Cichliformes
- Family: Cichlidae
- Tribe: Haplochromini
- Genus: Mbipia; Lippitsch & Seehausen, 1998

Type species
- Mbipia mbipi Lippitsch & Bouton

Genus of fishes

Mbipia is a putative genus of haplochromine cichlids which is endemic to Lake Victoria. This taxa within the genus Mbipia are currently considered by FishBase to be contained within Haplochromis until a comprehensive review of that genus is conducted, however other authorities recognise its validity.

If eventually separated from Haplochromis it would probably contain the following species:

- Mbipia lutea Seehausen & Bouton, 1998
- Mbipia mbipi Lippitsch & Bouton, 1998
