= Haplochromis olivaceus =

Conservation status
- Least Concern (IUCN 3.1)

Scientific classification
- Kingdom: Animalia
- Phylum: Chordata
- Class: Actinopterygii
- Order: Cichliformes
- Family: Cichlidae
- Genus: Haplochromis
- Species: H. olivaceus

Binomial name
- Haplochromis olivaceus Snoeks, De Vos, Coenen & Thys van den Audenaerde, 1990

Species of fish

Haplochromis olivaceus is a species of cichlid endemic to Lake Kivu on the border of the Democratic Republic of the Congo and Rwanda. This species can reach a length of 8.9 centimetres (3.5 in) SL.
