= Parvidens =

Parvidens may refer to:

- Cheiromeles parvidens, species of bat in the family Molossidae
- Hylogomphus parvidens, species of dragonfly in family Gomphidae
- Lipochromis sp. nov. 'parvidens-like', species of fish in the family Cichlidae
- Mautodontha parvidens, species of gastropod in the family Charopidae
- Parvidens, a genus of fly (Psychodidae, Phlebotominae)
