= Haplochromis erythromaculatus =

Conservation status
- Endangered (IUCN 3.1)

Scientific classification
- Kingdom: Animalia
- Phylum: Chordata
- Class: Actinopterygii
- Order: Cichliformes
- Family: Cichlidae
- Genus: Haplochromis
- Species: H. erythromaculatus

Binomial name
- Haplochromis erythromaculatus De Vos, Snoeks & Thys van den Audenaerde, 1991

Species of fish

Haplochromis erythromaculatus is a species of cichlid endemic to Rwanda where it occurs in Lake Bulera, Lake Ruhondo and their feeder rivers. This species can reach a length of 10.3 centimetres (4.1 in) SL.
