= Haplochromis kamiranzovu =

Conservation status
- Least Concern (IUCN 3.1)

Scientific classification
- Kingdom: Animalia
- Phylum: Chordata
- Class: Actinopterygii
- Order: Cichliformes
- Family: Cichlidae
- Genus: Haplochromis
- Species: H. kamiranzovu

Binomial name
- Haplochromis kamiranzovu Snoeks, Coenen & Thys van den Audenaerde, 1984

Species of fish

Haplochromis kamiranzovu is a species of cichlid endemic to Lake Kivu on the border of the Democratic Republic of the Congo and Rwanda. This species can reach a length of 9.4 centimetres (3.7 in) SL.
