= Haplochromis limax =

Conservation status
- Least Concern (IUCN 3.1)

Scientific classification
- Kingdom: Animalia
- Phylum: Chordata
- Class: Actinopterygii
- Order: Cichliformes
- Family: Cichlidae
- Genus: Haplochromis
- Species: H. limax

Binomial name
- Haplochromis limax Trewavas, 1933

Species of fish

Haplochromis limax is a species of cichlid found in the Democratic Republic of the Congo and Uganda where it occurs in Lake George and Lake Edward. This species can reach a length of 8.4 centimetres (3.3 in) SL.
