= Haplochromis pseudopellegrini =

Conservation status
- Data Deficient (IUCN 3.1)

Scientific classification
- Kingdom: Animalia
- Phylum: Chordata
- Class: Actinopterygii
- Order: Cichliformes
- Family: Cichlidae
- Genus: Haplochromis
- Species: H. pseudopellegrini

Binomial name
- Haplochromis pseudopellegrini Greenwood, 1967

Synonyms
- Prognathochromis pseudopellegrini (Greenwood, 1967)

Species of fish

Haplochromis pseudopellegrini is a species of cichlid populating Africa's freshwater Lake Victoria. This species can reach a length of 15 centimetres (5.9 in) SL.

== Lifestyle ==
Haplochromis pseudopellegrini is a carnivore that is usually in close offshore areas and some deep areas, and near the lake's muddy floor.

=== Diet ===
Haplochromis pseudopellegrini feeds on other freshwater fish in its lake habitat. There is little data on the cichlid's exact diet. The cichlid is harmless to humans.
