= Haplochromis thuragnathus =

Conservation status
- Data Deficient (IUCN 3.1)

Scientific classification
- Kingdom: Animalia
- Phylum: Chordata
- Class: Actinopterygii
- Order: Cichliformes
- Family: Cichlidae
- Genus: Haplochromis
- Species: H. thuragnathus

Binomial name
- Haplochromis thuragnathus Greenwood, 1967

Synonyms
- Harpagochromis thuragnathus (Greenwood, 1967)

Species of fish

Haplochromis thuragnathus is a species of cichlid endemic to Lake Victoria in Africa. This species reaches a length of 20 centimetres (7.9 in) SL.
