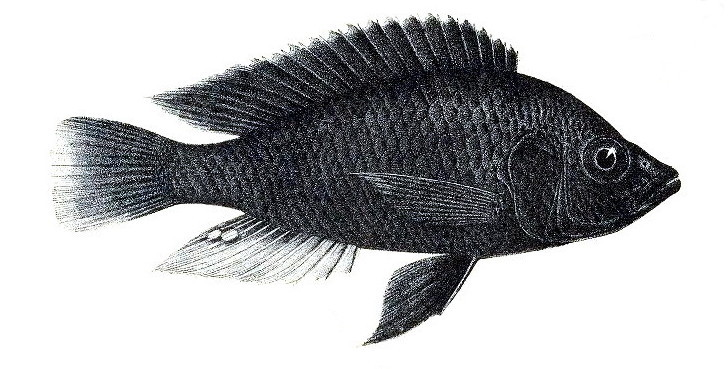

Conservation status
- Vulnerable (IUCN 3.1)

Scientific classification
- Kingdom: Animalia
- Phylum: Chordata
- Class: Actinopterygii
- Order: Cichliformes
- Family: Cichlidae
- Genus: Haplochromis
- Species: H. nubilus

Binomial name
- Haplochromis nubilus (Boulenger, 1906)

Synonyms
- Tilapia nubila Boulenger, 1906

= Haplochromis nubilus =

Blue Victoria mouthbrooder

Species of fish

Haplochromis nubilus, the blue Victoria mouthbrooder, is a species of cichlid found in the Lake Victoria system in East Africa. It inhabits shallow areas near shores. This species can reach a standard length of 9.3 cm (3.7 in). It is omnivorous and feeds on algae, small crustaceans, and insect larvae.

== Description ==
Males are black during spawning with red anal and dorsal fins. Females have dull coloration consisting of brown and green shades. Dominant males become very aggressive and territorial when spawning. As with other cichlids, their life expectancy is around 10 years.

== See also ==
- List of freshwater aquarium fish species
