= Haplochromis macropsoides =

Conservation status
- Least Concern (IUCN 3.1)

Scientific classification
- Kingdom: Animalia
- Phylum: Chordata
- Class: Actinopterygii
- Order: Cichliformes
- Family: Cichlidae
- Genus: Haplochromis
- Species: H. macropsoides

Binomial name
- Haplochromis macropsoides Greenwood, 1973

Synonyms
- Astatotilapia macropsoides (Greenwood, 1973)

Species of fish

Haplochromis macropsoides is a species of cichlid endemic to Uganda where it is known to occur in Lake George and the Kazinga Channel and may also be found in Lake Edward.

This species can reach a length of 7.7 centimetres (3.0 in) SL.
