= Haplochromis microchrysomelas =

Conservation status
- Least Concern (IUCN 3.1)

Scientific classification
- Kingdom: Animalia
- Phylum: Chordata
- Class: Actinopterygii
- Order: Cichliformes
- Family: Cichlidae
- Genus: Haplochromis
- Species: H. microchrysomelas

Binomial name
- Haplochromis microchrysomelas Snoeks, 1994

Species of fish

Haplochromis microchrysomelas is a species of cichlid endemic to Lake Kivu in Rwanda. This species can reach a length of 8.3 centimetres (3.3 in) SL.
