= Haplochromis xenognathus =

Conservation status
- Least Concern (IUCN 3.1)

Scientific classification
- Kingdom: Animalia
- Phylum: Chordata
- Class: Actinopterygii
- Order: Cichliformes
- Family: Cichlidae
- Genus: Haplochromis
- Species: H. xenognathus

Binomial name
- Haplochromis xenognathus Greenwood, 1957

Synonyms
- Ptyochromis xenognathus (Greenwood, 1957)

Species of fish

Haplochromis xenognathus is a species of cichlid endemic to Lake Victoria. This species reaches a length of 11.3 centimetres (4.4 in) SL.
