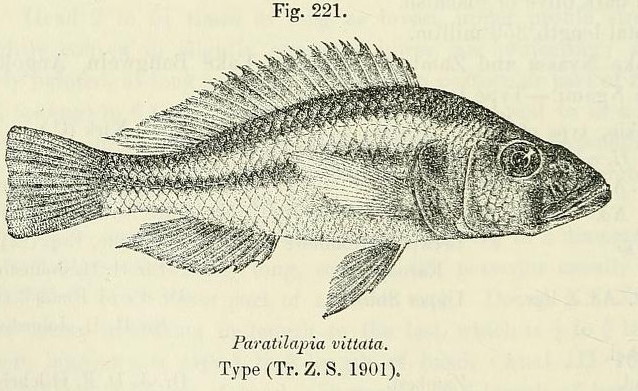

Conservation status
- Least Concern (IUCN 3.1)

Scientific classification
- Kingdom: Animalia
- Phylum: Chordata
- Class: Actinopterygii
- Order: Cichliformes
- Family: Cichlidae
- Genus: Haplochromis
- Species: H. vittatus

Binomial name
- Haplochromis vittatus (Boulenger, 1901)

Synonyms
- Paratilapia vittata Boulenger, 1901; Prognathochromis vittatus (Boulenger, 1901)

= Haplochromis vittatus =

Species of fish

Haplochromis vittatus is a species of cichlid endemic to Lake Kivu in East Africa. This species reaches a length of 19.1 centimetres (7.5 in) SL.
