= Haplochromis pharyngomylus =

Conservation status
- Data Deficient (IUCN 3.1)

Scientific classification
- Kingdom: Animalia
- Phylum: Chordata
- Class: Actinopterygii
- Order: Cichliformes
- Family: Cichlidae
- Genus: Haplochromis
- Species: H. pharyngomylus

Binomial name
- Haplochromis pharyngomylus Regan, 1929

Synonyms
- Labrochromis pharyngomylus (Regan, 1929)

Species of fish

Haplochromis pharyngomylus is a species of cichlid endemic to Lake Victoria. This species can reach a length of 12.6 centimetres (5.0 in) SL. This species feeds mainly on mollusks with both bivalves and gastropods eaten in approximately equal proportions.

It is only found in the littoral and sub-littoral zone with a firm substrate such as sand or rock and it feeds on molluscs which it crushes using its pharyngeal teeth.
