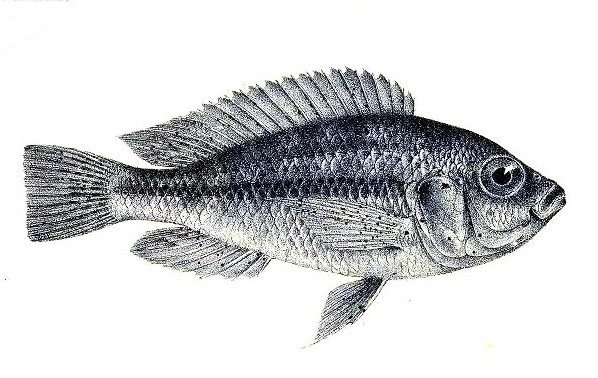

Conservation status
- Critically endangered, possibly extinct (IUCN 3.1)

Scientific classification
- Kingdom: Animalia
- Phylum: Chordata
- Class: Actinopterygii
- Order: Cichliformes
- Family: Cichlidae
- Genus: Haplochromis
- Species: H. crassilabris

Binomial name
- Haplochromis crassilabris Boulenger, 1906

Synonyms
- Paralabidochromis crassilabris (Boulenger, 1906); Paratilapia crassilabris (Boulenger, 1906)

= Haplochromis crassilabris =

Species of fish

Haplochromis crassilabris is a species of cichlid endemic to Lake Victoria, though it may now be extinct. This species grows to a length of 15 centimetres (5.9 in) TL.
