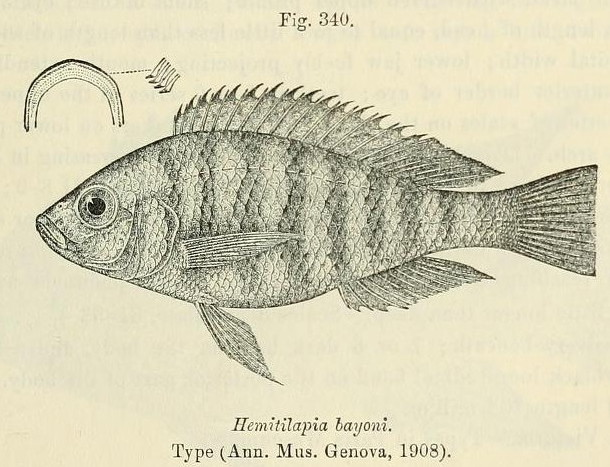

Conservation status
- Vulnerable (IUCN 3.1)

Scientific classification
- Kingdom: Animalia
- Phylum: Chordata
- Class: Actinopterygii
- Order: Cichliformes
- Family: Cichlidae
- Genus: Haplochromis
- Species: H. obliquidens

Binomial name
- Haplochromis obliquidens (Hilgendorf, 1888)

Synonyms
- Chromis obliquidens Hilgendorf, 1888; Ctenochromis obliquidens (Hilgendorf, 1888); Tilapia obliquidens (Hilgendorf, 1888); Hemitilapia bayoni Boulenger, 1908; Clinodon bayoni (Boulenger, 1908)

= Haplochromis obliquidens =

Species of fish

Haplochromis obliquidens is an African species of cichlid found in Lake Victoria and the adjacent reaches of the Nile. This species can reach a standard length of 8.9 cm (3.5 in). Another species sometimes seen in the aquarium trade, Astatotilapia latifasciata of the Lake Kyoga system, is frequently labelled as Haplochromis "zebra obliquidens", which sometimes cause confusion between the species. Unlike that species, H. obliquidens is not known from the aquarium trade.
