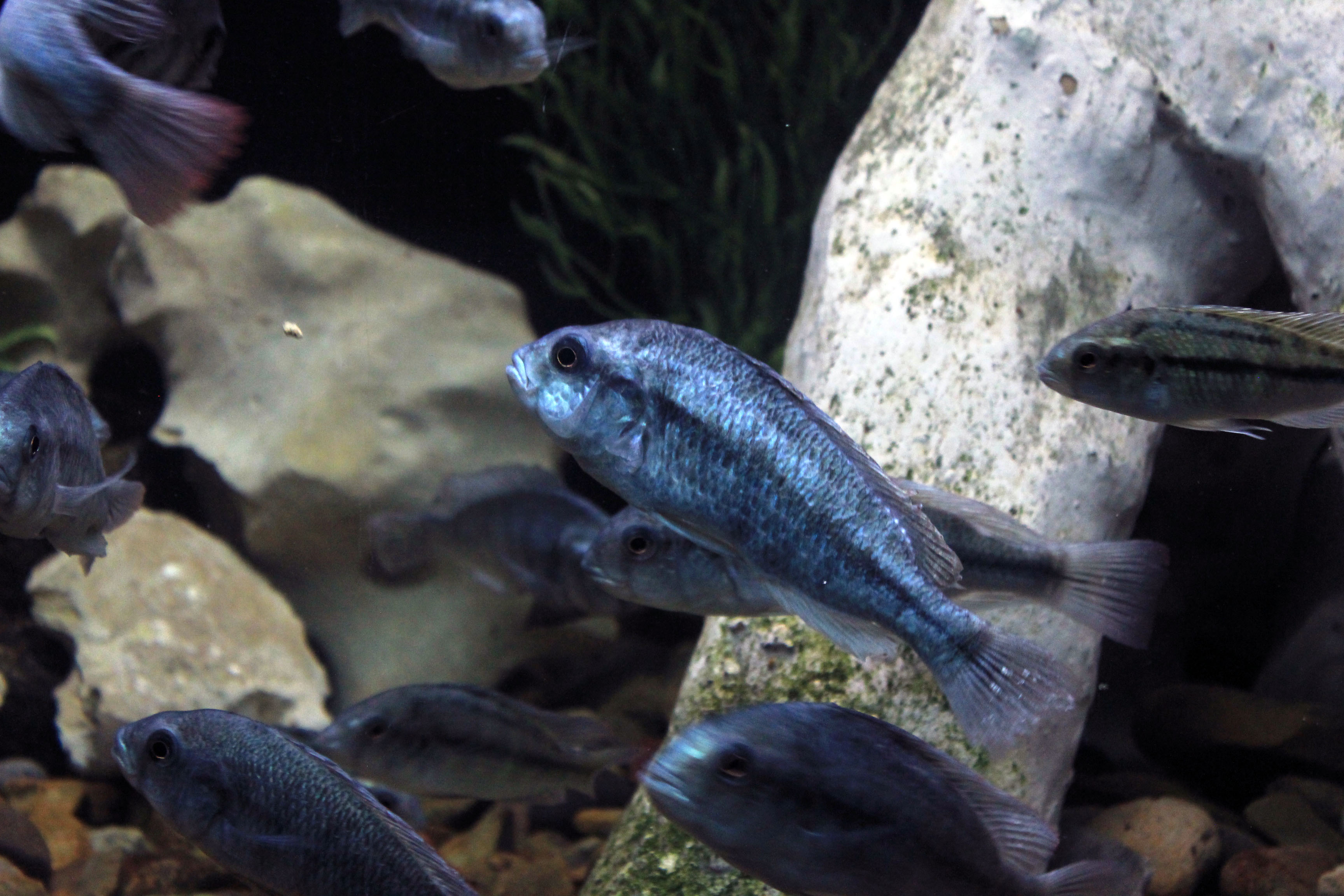

Conservation status
- Least Concern (IUCN 3.1)

Scientific classification
- Kingdom: Animalia
- Phylum: Chordata
- Class: Actinopterygii
- Order: Cichliformes
- Family: Cichlidae
- Genus: Haplochromis
- Species: H. degeni

Binomial name
- Haplochromis degeni (Boulenger, 1906)

Synonyms
- Platytaeniodus degeni Boulenger, 1906

= Haplochromis degeni =

Species of fish

Haplochromis degeni is a species of cichlid endemic to Lake Victoria. It is sometimes placed in the monotypic genus Platytaeniodus, but FishBase leaves it in Haplochromis pending a thorough review of that group. This species grows to a length of 15.4 centimetres (6.1 in) SL.

== Etymology ==
The specific name honours the Swiss naturalist Edward Degen (1852-1922) who collected fishes, including the type of this species.
