= Haplochromis melanopterus =

Conservation status
- Vulnerable (IUCN 3.1)

Scientific classification
- Kingdom: Animalia
- Phylum: Chordata
- Class: Actinopterygii
- Order: Cichliformes
- Family: Cichlidae
- Genus: Haplochromis
- Species: H. melanopterus

Binomial name
- Haplochromis melanopterus Trewavas,1928

Species of fish

Haplochromis melanopterus is a species of cichlid endemic to the Tanzanian portion of Lake Victoria where it occurs in Smith Sound. This species can reach a length of 12.7 centimetres (5.0 in) SL.
