= Haplochromis schubotziellus =

Conservation status
- Least Concern (IUCN 3.1)

Scientific classification
- Kingdom: Animalia
- Phylum: Chordata
- Class: Actinopterygii
- Order: Cichliformes
- Family: Cichlidae
- Genus: Haplochromis
- Species: H. schubotziellus

Binomial name
- Haplochromis schubotziellus Greenwood, 1973

Synonyms
- Astatotilapia schubotziella (Greenwood, 1973)

Species of fish

Haplochromis schubotziellus is a species of cichlid found in Lake George and the Kazinga Channel and possibly also in Lake Edward. This species reaches a length of 7.9 centimetres (3.1 in) SL.
