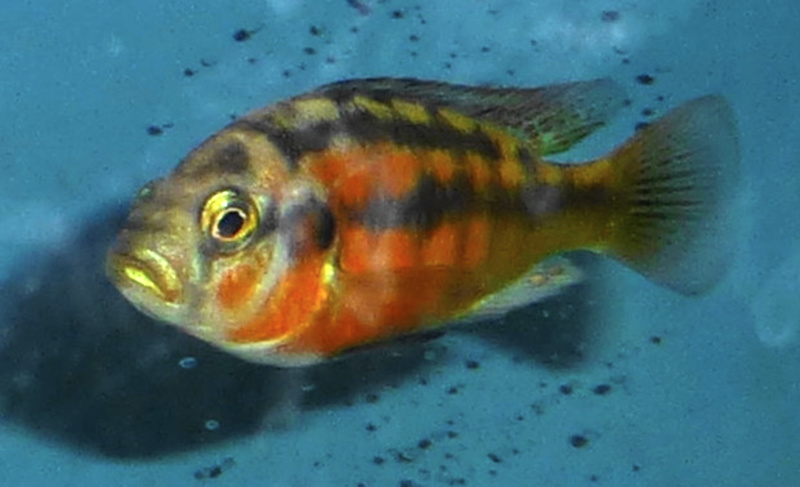

Conservation status
- Vulnerable (IUCN 3.1)

Scientific classification
- Kingdom: Animalia
- Phylum: Chordata
- Class: Actinopterygii
- Order: Cichliformes
- Family: Cichlidae
- Genus: Haplochromis
- Species: H. sauvagei

Binomial name
- Haplochromis sauvagei (Pfeffer, 1896)

Synonyms
- Ctenochromis sauvagei Pfeffer, 1896; Ptyochromis sauvagei (Pfeffer, 1896)

= Haplochromis sauvagei =

Species of fish

Haplochromis sauvagei is a species of cichlid endemic to Lake Victoria. This species reaches a length of 10.5 centimetres (4.1 in) SL. Its specific name honours the French paleontologist and ichthyologist Henri Émile Sauvage (1842–1917).
