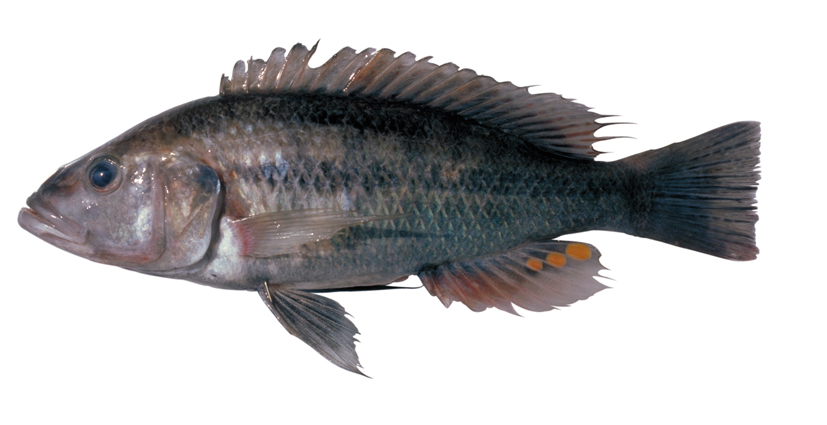

Conservation status
- Critically endangered, possibly extinct (IUCN 3.1)

Scientific classification
- Kingdom: Animalia
- Phylum: Chordata
- Class: Actinopterygii
- Order: Cichliformes
- Family: Cichlidae
- Genus: Haplochromis
- Species: H. vonlinnei

Binomial name
- Haplochromis vonlinnei van Oijen & de Zeeuw, 2008

= Haplochromis vonlinnei =

Species of fish

Haplochromis vonlinnei is a species of cichlid endemic to Lake Victoria. It is greyish in color with a distinct mid-lateral band, and a rather slender shape. It feeds mainly on smaller fish. This species can reach a length of 15.9 centimetres (6.3 in) SL. The population of the species has declined due to the introduction of the Nile perch in the 1950s. It has not been recorded since 1980 and the IUCN lists it as "Critically Endangered" and considers it may already be extinct. This fish is named in honour of the Swedish naturalist, Carl Linnaeus.

== Description ==
Haplochromis vonlinnei is a moderate-sized, slender cichlid with an acute snout, slightly protruding lower jaw and curved teeth. It is a greyish color with a narrow, intermittent blackish dorsal-lateral band and a broader, more distinct mid-lateral band. The flanks are yellowish and the belly white. In the male, the anal fin is grey with two to four bright orange circular spots with thin white rims (egg dummies). In the female, the anal fin is yellowish with two darker yellow spots. Haplochromis vonlinnei ranges in size from 115 to 159 mm (4.5 to 6.3 in).

Among other fish in the genus Haplochromis found in Lake Victoria, it is similar in shape to H. pyrrhopteryx but differs in colouring as that species lacks a mid-lateral band. It also resembles H. altigenis in morphology, but that species has a differently shaped head and less-curved teeth.

== Distribution and habitat ==
Haplochromis vonlinnei is endemic to Lake Victoria where it is known from the Mwanza Gulf region in Tanzania. It is presumed to be a demersal fish and is found near the lakebed over muddy substrates at depths between 5.5 and 18 m (18 and 59 ft).

== Status ==
The Nile perch (Lates niloticus) was introduced into Lake Victoria in the 1950s with the objective of making the lake fisheries more productive. It is a fish-eating predator and since its introduction, many species of cichlid in the genus Haplochromis have suffered significant declines in number, and Haplochromis vonlinnei is one of these. The fish was already uncommon in the 1970s, and it has not been recorded since 1980, when several specimens were caught by trawling during a survey undertaken by Tanzania. The IUCN has listed Haplochromis vonlinnei as being "Critically Endangered" and suggests it is either exceedingly rare with very few individuals remaining, or may already be extinct. Another factor that may affect any remaining fish is the diminished clarity of the water which may make mate recognition more difficult.
