= Haplochromis taurinus =

Conservation status
- Least Concern (IUCN 3.1)

Scientific classification
- Kingdom: Animalia
- Phylum: Chordata
- Class: Actinopterygii
- Order: Cichliformes
- Family: Cichlidae
- Genus: Haplochromis
- Species: H. taurinus

Binomial name
- Haplochromis taurinus Trewavas, 1933

Synonyms
- Lipochromis taurinus (Trewavas, 1933)

Species of fish

Haplochromis taurinus is a species of cichlid found in the Democratic Republic of the Congo and Uganda where it occurs in Lake George, Lake Edward and the Kazinga Channel. This species reaches a length of 14 centimetres (5.5 in) SL.
