= Haplochromis insidiae =

Conservation status
- Least Concern (IUCN 3.1)

Scientific classification
- Kingdom: Animalia
- Phylum: Chordata
- Class: Actinopterygii
- Order: Cichliformes
- Family: Cichlidae
- Genus: Haplochromis
- Species: H. insidiae

Binomial name
- Haplochromis insidiae Snoeks, 1994

Synonyms
- Haplochromis insidae (lapsus)

Species of fish

Haplochromis insidiae is a species of cichlid endemic to Lake Kivu on the border of the Democratic Republic of the Congo and Rwanda. This species can reach a length of 9.4 centimetres (3.7 in) SL.
