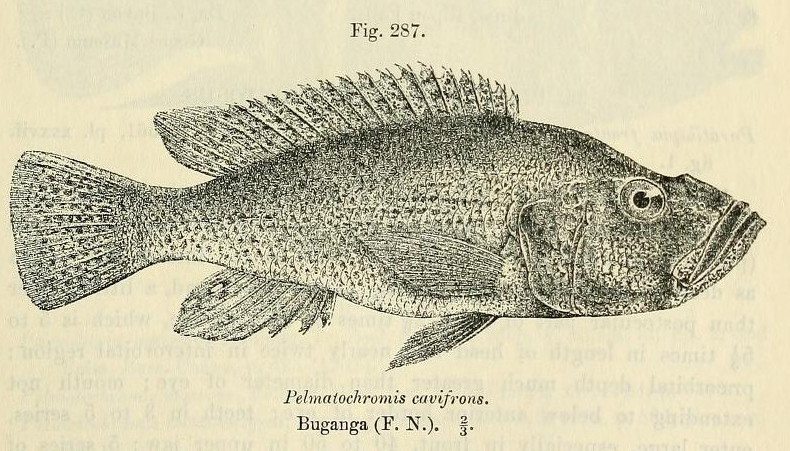

Conservation status
- Data Deficient (IUCN 3.1)

Scientific classification
- Kingdom: Animalia
- Phylum: Chordata
- Class: Actinopterygii
- Order: Cichliformes
- Family: Cichlidae
- Genus: Haplochromis
- Species: H. cavifrons

Binomial name
- Haplochromis cavifrons (Hilgendorf, 1888)

Synonyms
- Paratilapia cavifrons Hilgendorf, 1888; Harpagochromis cavifrons (Hilgendorf, 1888); Hemichromis cavifrons (Hilgendorf, 1888); Pelmatochromis cavifrons (Hilgendorf, 1888)

= Haplochromis cavifrons =

Species of fish

Haplochromis cavifrons is a species of cichlid endemic to Lake Victoria. It is a benthopelagic fish, and is generally found a few hundred metres beyond the shore over hard substrate. This species grows to a length of 19.5 centimetres (7.7 in) SL.
