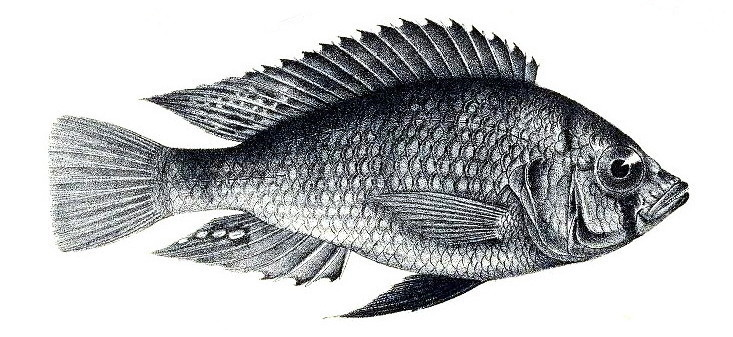

Conservation status
- Data Deficient (IUCN 3.1)

Scientific classification
- Kingdom: Animalia
- Phylum: Chordata
- Class: Actinopterygii
- Order: Cichliformes
- Family: Cichlidae
- Genus: Haplochromis
- Species: H. nuchisquamulatus

Binomial name
- Haplochromis nuchisquamulatus (Hilgendorf, 1888)

Synonyms
- Chromis nuchisquamulatus Hilgendorf, 1888; Ctenochromis nuchisquamulatus (Hilgendorf, 1888); Tilapia nuchisquamulata (Hilgendorf, 1888); Xystichromis nuchisquamulatus (Hilgendorf, 1888)

= Haplochromis nuchisquamulatus =

Species of fish

Haplochromis nuchisquamulatus is a species of cichlid found in Lake Victoria and the adjacent reaches of the Nile. This species can reach a length of 11.3 centimetres (4.4 in) SL.
