= Haplochromis victoriae =

Conservation status
- Data Deficient (IUCN 3.1)

Scientific classification
- Kingdom: Animalia
- Phylum: Chordata
- Class: Actinopterygii
- Order: Cichliformes
- Family: Cichlidae
- Genus: Haplochromis
- Species: H. victoriae

Binomial name
- Haplochromis victoriae (Greenwood, 1956)

Synonyms
- Paralabidochromis victoriae Greenwood, 1956

Species of fish

Haplochromis victoriae is a species of cichlid endemic to Lake Victoria. This species can reach a length of 7.6 centimetres (3.0 in) SL.
