= Haplochromis rudolfianus =

Conservation status
- Least Concern (IUCN 3.1)

Scientific classification
- Kingdom: Animalia
- Phylum: Chordata
- Class: Actinopterygii
- Order: Cichliformes
- Family: Cichlidae
- Genus: Haplochromis
- Species: H. rudolfianus

Binomial name
- Haplochromis rudolfianus Trewavas, 1933

Synonyms
- Thoracochromis rudolfianus (Trewavas, 1933)

Species of fish

Haplochromis rudolfianus is a species of cichlid endemic to Lake Turkana. This species can reach a length of 5.8 centimetres (2.3 in) SL.
