= Haplochromis aelocephalus =

Conservation status
- Critically endangered, possibly extinct (IUCN 3.1)

Scientific classification
- Kingdom: Animalia
- Phylum: Chordata
- Class: Actinopterygii
- Order: Cichliformes
- Family: Cichlidae
- Genus: Haplochromis
- Species: H. aelocephalus

Binomial name
- Haplochromis aelocephalus Greenwood, 1959

Synonyms
- Psammochromis aelocephalus Greenwood, 1959

Species of fish

Haplochromis aelocephalus is a species of cichlid endemic to Lake Victoria, but has not been seen since 1985. It may be extinct, but is maintained as Critically Endangered by the IUCN in the small chance that a tiny –but currently unknown– population survives. This species can reach a length of 12 centimetres (4.7 in) SL.
