= Haplochromis sp. nov. 'Amboseli' =

Conservation status
- Critically Endangered (IUCN 3.1)

Scientific classification
- Kingdom: Animalia
- Phylum: Chordata
- Class: Actinopterygii
- Order: Cichliformes
- Family: Cichlidae
- Subfamily: Pseudocrenilabrinae
- Genus: Haplochromis
- Species: H. sp. nov. 'Amboseli'

Binomial name
- Haplochromis sp. nov. 'Amboseli'

Species of fish

Haplochromis sp. nov. 'Amboseli' is a species of fish in the family Cichlidae. It is endemic to Kenya. Its natural habitat is swamps. It is threatened by habitat loss.
