= Haplochromis paropius =

Conservation status
- Least Concern (IUCN 3.1)

Scientific classification
- Kingdom: Animalia
- Phylum: Chordata
- Class: Actinopterygii
- Order: Cichliformes
- Family: Cichlidae
- Genus: Haplochromis
- Species: H. paropius

Binomial name
- Haplochromis paropius Greenwood & Gee, 1969

Synonyms
- Enterochromis paropius (Greenwood & Gee, 1969)

Species of fish

Haplochromis paropius is a species of cichlid endemic to Lake Victoria. This species can reach a length of 8.7 centimetres (3.4 in) SL.
