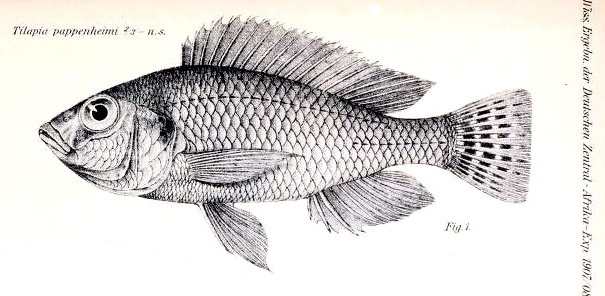

Conservation status
- Least Concern (IUCN 3.1)

Scientific classification
- Kingdom: Animalia
- Phylum: Chordata
- Class: Actinopterygii
- Order: Cichliformes
- Family: Cichlidae
- Genus: Haplochromis
- Species: H. pappenheimi

Binomial name
- Haplochromis pappenheimi (Boulenger, 1914)

Synonyms
- Tilapia pappenheimi Boulenger, 1914; Yssichromis pappenheimi (Boulenger, 1914)

= Haplochromis pappenheimi =

Species of fish

Haplochromis pappenheimi is a species of cichlid found in the Democratic Republic of the Congo and Uganda where it occurs in Lake Edward, Lake George and the Kazinga Channel. This species can reach a length of 6.1 centimetres (2.4 in) SL. The specific name honours the curator of fishes at the Royal Museum, Berlin Paul Pappenheim (1878-1945), who was the co-author of the paper in which this species was described.
