= Katavi mouthbrooder =

Conservation status
- Vulnerable (IUCN 3.1)

Scientific classification
- Kingdom: Animalia
- Phylum: Chordata
- Class: Actinopterygii
- Order: Cichliformes
- Family: Cichlidae
- Genus: Haplochromis
- Species: H. katavi

Binomial name
- Haplochromis katavi Seegers, 1996

Species of fish

The Katavi mouthbrooder (Haplochromis katavi) is a species of cichlid fish endemic to Tanzania where it is found in the Lake Rukwa drainage. This species can reach a length of 9.9 centimetres (3.9 in) TL.
