= Haplochromis laparogramma =

Conservation status
- Least Concern (IUCN 3.1)

Scientific classification
- Kingdom: Animalia
- Phylum: Chordata
- Class: Actinopterygii
- Order: Cichliformes
- Family: Cichlidae
- Genus: Haplochromis
- Species: H. laparogramma

Binomial name
- Haplochromis laparogramma Greenwood & Gee, 1969

Synonyms
- Yssichromis laparogramma (Greenwood & Gee, 1969)

Species of fish

Haplochromis laparogramma is a species of cichlid endemic to Lake Victoria. This species can reach a length of 8.5 centimetres (3.3 in) SL.
