= Haplochromis teegelaari =

Conservation status
- Critically endangered, possibly extinct (IUCN 3.1)

Scientific classification
- Kingdom: Animalia
- Phylum: Chordata
- Class: Actinopterygii
- Order: Cichliformes
- Family: Cichlidae
- Genus: Haplochromis
- Species: H. teegelaari

Binomial name
- Haplochromis teegelaari Greenwood & Barel, 1978

Synonyms
- Labrochromis teegelaari (Greenwood & Barel, 1978)

Species of fish

Haplochromis teegelaari is a species of cichlid endemic to Lake Victoria. It is critically endangered, though it may now be extinct. This species reaches a length of 10.1 centimetres (4.0 in) SL. Its specific name honours the Dutch biological artist Nico Teegelaar.
