= Haplochromis barbarae =

Conservation status
- Critically endangered, possibly extinct (IUCN 3.1)

Scientific classification
- Kingdom: Animalia
- Phylum: Chordata
- Class: Actinopterygii
- Order: Cichliformes
- Family: Cichlidae
- Genus: Haplochromis
- Species: H. barbarae

Binomial name
- Haplochromis barbarae Greenwood, 1967

Synonyms
- Astatotilapia barbarae (Greenwood, 1967)

Species of fish

Haplochromis barbarae is a species of cichlid endemic to Lake Victoria where it may now be extinct. This species can reach a length of 10.6 centimetres (4.2 in) SL. The honors Barbara Williams who illustrated many of Greenwood's papers.
