= Haplochromis petronius =

Conservation status
- Vulnerable (IUCN 3.1)

Scientific classification
- Kingdom: Animalia
- Phylum: Chordata
- Class: Actinopterygii
- Order: Cichliformes
- Family: Cichlidae
- Genus: Haplochromis
- Species: H. petronius

Binomial name
- Haplochromis petronius Greenwood, 1973

Synonyms
- Thoracochromis petronius (Greenwood, 1973)

Species of fish

Haplochromis petronius is a species of cichlid endemic to Lake George, Uganda. This species can reach a length of 8.8 centimetres (3.5 in) SL.
