= Haplochromis occultidens =

Conservation status
- Least Concern (IUCN 3.1)

Scientific classification
- Kingdom: Animalia
- Phylum: Chordata
- Class: Actinopterygii
- Order: Cichliformes
- Family: Cichlidae
- Genus: Haplochromis
- Species: H. occultidens

Binomial name
- Haplochromis occultidens Snoeks, 1988

Species of fish

Haplochromis occultidens is a species of cichlid endemic to Lake Kivu on the border of the Democratic Republic of the Congo and Rwanda. This species can reach a length of 12.3 centimetres (4.8 in) SL.
