= Haplochromis nigripinnis =

Conservation status
- Least Concern (IUCN 3.1)

Scientific classification
- Kingdom: Animalia
- Phylum: Chordata
- Class: Actinopterygii
- Order: Cichliformes
- Family: Cichlidae
- Genus: Haplochromis
- Species: H. nigripinnis

Binomial name
- Haplochromis nigripinnis Regan, 1921

Synonyms
- Enterochromis nigripinnis (Regan, 1921)

Species of fish

Haplochromis nigripinnis is a species of cichlid found in the Democratic Republic of the Congo and Uganda where it occurs in Lake George, Lake Edward and the Kazinga Channel. This species can reach a length of 6.8 centimetres (2.7 in) SL.
