= Haplochromis howesi =

Conservation status
- Vulnerable (IUCN 3.1)

Scientific classification
- Kingdom: Animalia
- Phylum: Chordata
- Class: Actinopterygii
- Order: Cichliformes
- Family: Cichlidae
- Genus: Haplochromis
- Species: H. howesi

Binomial name
- Haplochromis howesi van Oijen, 1992

Species of fish

Haplochromis howesi is a species of cichlid endemic to Lake Victoria. This species can reach a length of 16.3 centimetres (6.4 in) SL. The specific name honours the British taxonomist Gordon J. Howes (1938-2013) of the British Museum (Natural History).
