= Haplochromis nigroides =

Conservation status
- Least Concern (IUCN 3.1)

Scientific classification
- Kingdom: Animalia
- Phylum: Chordata
- Class: Actinopterygii
- Order: Cichliformes
- Family: Cichlidae
- Genus: Haplochromis
- Species: H. nigroides

Binomial name
- Haplochromis nigroides (Pellegrin, 1928)

Synonyms
- Astatotilapia astatodon nigroides Pellegrin, 1928; Haplochromis astatodon nigroides (Pellegrin, 1928)

Species of fish

Haplochromis nigroides is a species of cichlid endemic to Lake Kivu on the border of the Democratic Republic of the Congo and Rwanda. This species can reach a length of 7.5 centimetres (3.0 in) SL.
