= Haplochromis obtusidens =

Conservation status
- Data Deficient (IUCN 3.1)

Scientific classification
- Kingdom: Animalia
- Phylum: Chordata
- Class: Actinopterygii
- Order: Cichliformes
- Family: Cichlidae
- Genus: Haplochromis
- Species: H. obtusidens

Binomial name
- Haplochromis obtusidens Trewavas, 1928

Synonyms
- Gaurochromis obtusidens (Trewavas, 1928)

Species of fish

Haplochromis obtusidens is a species of cichlid endemic to Lake Victoria. This species can reach a length of 11.4 centimetres (4.5 in) SL.
