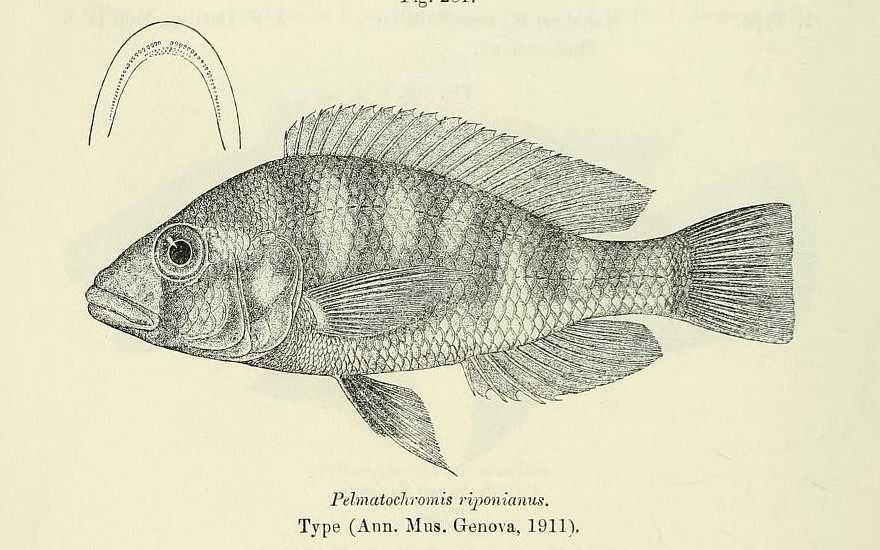

Conservation status
- Least Concern (IUCN 3.1)

Scientific classification
- Kingdom: Animalia
- Phylum: Chordata
- Class: Actinopterygii
- Order: Cichliformes
- Family: Cichlidae
- Genus: Haplochromis
- Species: H. riponianus

Binomial name
- Haplochromis riponianus (Boulenger, 1911)

Synonyms
- Pelmatochromis riponianus Boulenger, 1911; Psammochromis riponianus (Boulenger, 1911)

= Haplochromis riponianus =

Species of fish

Haplochromis riponianus is a species of cichlid found in Lake Victoria and possibly in the adjacent reaches of the Nile. This species can reach a length of 10.4 centimetres (4.1 in) SL.
