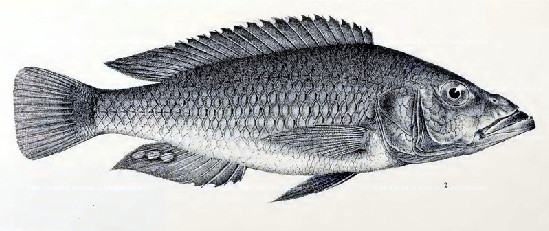

Conservation status
- Data Deficient (IUCN 3.1)

Scientific classification
- Kingdom: Animalia
- Phylum: Chordata
- Class: Actinopterygii
- Order: Cichliformes
- Family: Cichlidae
- Genus: Haplochromis
- Species: H. mento

Binomial name
- Haplochromis mento Regan, 1922

Synonyms
- Prognathochromis mento (Regan, 1922)

= Haplochromis mento =

Species of fish

Haplochromis mento is a species of cichlid endemic to Lake Victoria. This species can reach a length of 17.8 centimetres (7.0 in) SL.
