= Haplochromis estor =

Conservation status
- Data Deficient (IUCN 3.1)

Scientific classification
- Kingdom: Animalia
- Phylum: Chordata
- Class: Actinopterygii
- Order: Cichliformes
- Family: Cichlidae
- Genus: Haplochromis
- Species: H. estor

Binomial name
- Haplochromis estor Regan, 1929

Synonyms
- Prognathochromis estor (Regan, 1929)

Species of fish

Haplochromis estor is a piscivorous species of cichlid endemic to Lake Victoria. This species can reach a length of 17 centimetres (6.7 in) SL. This cichlid was first documented by Charles Tate Regan.
