= Haplochromis maxillaris =

Conservation status
- Vulnerable (IUCN 3.1)

Scientific classification
- Kingdom: Animalia
- Phylum: Chordata
- Class: Actinopterygii
- Order: Cichliformes
- Family: Cichlidae
- Genus: Haplochromis
- Species: H. maxillaris

Binomial name
- Haplochromis maxillaris Trewavas, 1928

Synonyms
- Lipochromis maxillaris (Trewavas, 1928)

Species of fish

Haplochromis maxillaris is a species of cichlid endemic to Lake Victoria. This species can reach a length of 16 centimetres (6.3 in) SL.
