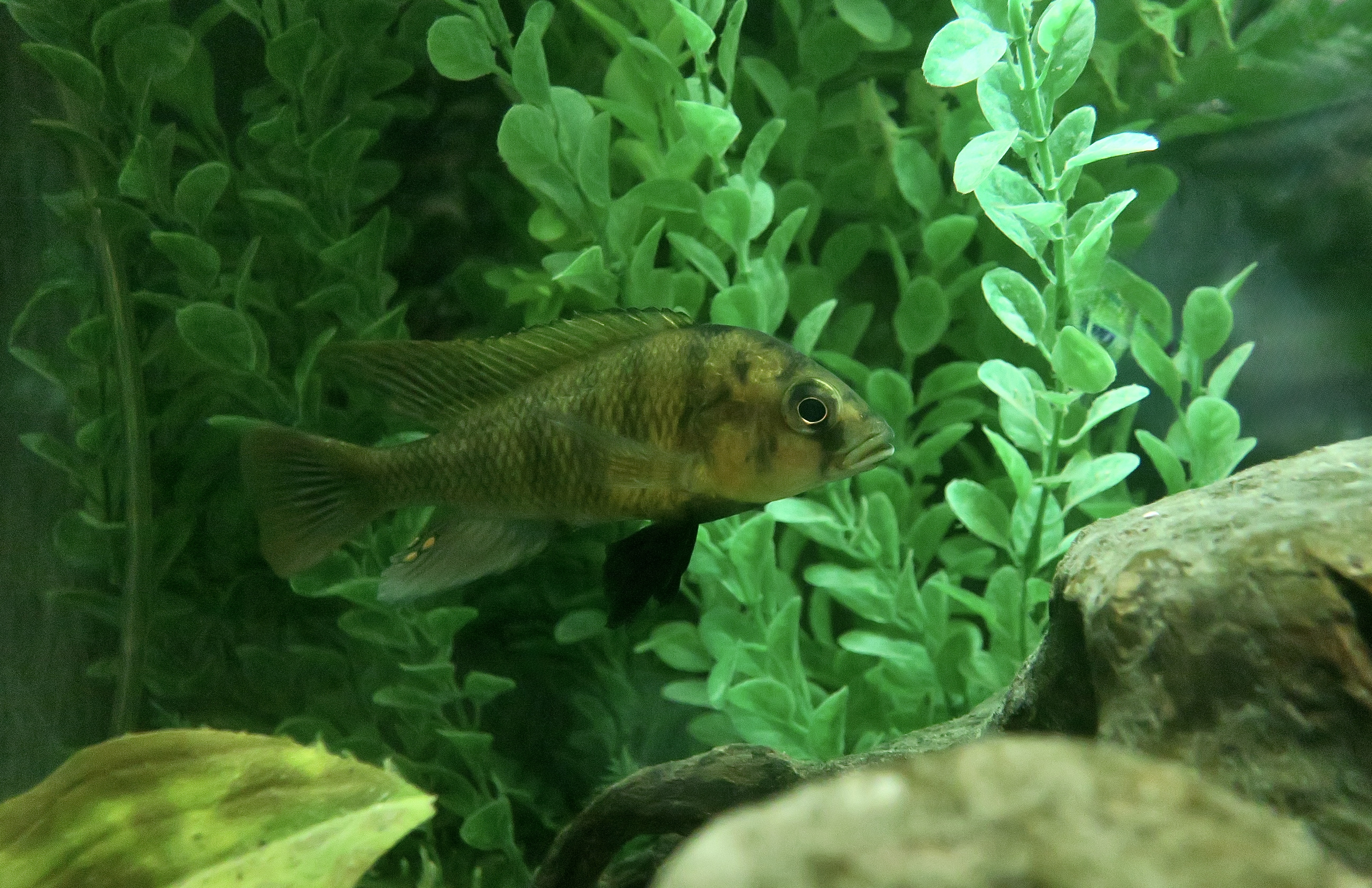
- At Bronx Zoo.

Conservation status
- Critically endangered, possibly extinct (IUCN 3.1)

Scientific classification
- Kingdom: Animalia
- Phylum: Chordata
- Class: Actinopterygii
- Order: Cichliformes
- Family: Cichlidae
- Genus: Haplochromis
- Species: H. ishmaeli

Binomial name
- Haplochromis ishmaeli Boulenger, 1906

Synonyms
- Labrochromis ishmaeli (Boulenger, 1906)

= Haplochromis ishmaeli =

Species of fish

Haplochromis ishmaeli is a species of cichlid endemic to Lake Victoria. It is currently considered to be critically endangered, though it may now be extinct in the wild. This species can reach a length of 13.6 centimetres (5.4 in) SL. A captive "insurance population" is maintained.

== Etymology ==
The specific name honours George Ishmael, who was an interpreter at the Police Court in Entebbe, who gave valuable assistance to the Swiss ornithologist Edward Degen while he was in Uganda.

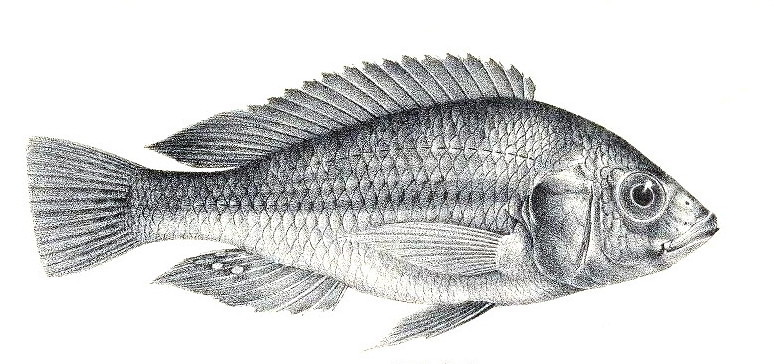
A drawing of H. ishmaeli from 1907 by George Albert Boulenger.
