= Haplochromis cassius =

Conservation status
- Critically endangered, possibly extinct (IUCN 3.1)

Scientific classification
- Kingdom: Animalia
- Phylum: Chordata
- Class: Actinopterygii
- Order: Cichliformes
- Family: Cichlidae
- Genus: Haplochromis
- Species: H. cassius

Binomial name
- Haplochromis cassius Greenwood & Barel, 1978

Synonyms
- Psammochromis cassius (Greenwood & Barel, 1978)

Species of fish

Haplochromis cassius is a species of cichlid endemic to Lake Victoria where it may now be extinct. This species grows to a length of 9.8 centimetres (3.9 in) SL.
