= Haplochromis paludinosus =

Conservation status
- Least Concern (IUCN 3.1)

Scientific classification
- Kingdom: Animalia
- Phylum: Chordata
- Class: Actinopterygii
- Order: Cichliformes
- Family: Cichlidae
- Genus: Haplochromis
- Species: H. paludinosus

Binomial name
- Haplochromis paludinosus (Greenwood, 1980)

Synonyms
- Astatotilapia paludinosa Greenwood, 1980; Haplochromis paludinosa (Greenwood, 1980)

Species of fish

Haplochromis paludinosus is a species of cichlid endemic to Tanzania where it is found in the lower Malagarasi River and the surrounding swamps. This species can reach a length of 14 centimetres (5.5 in) SL.
