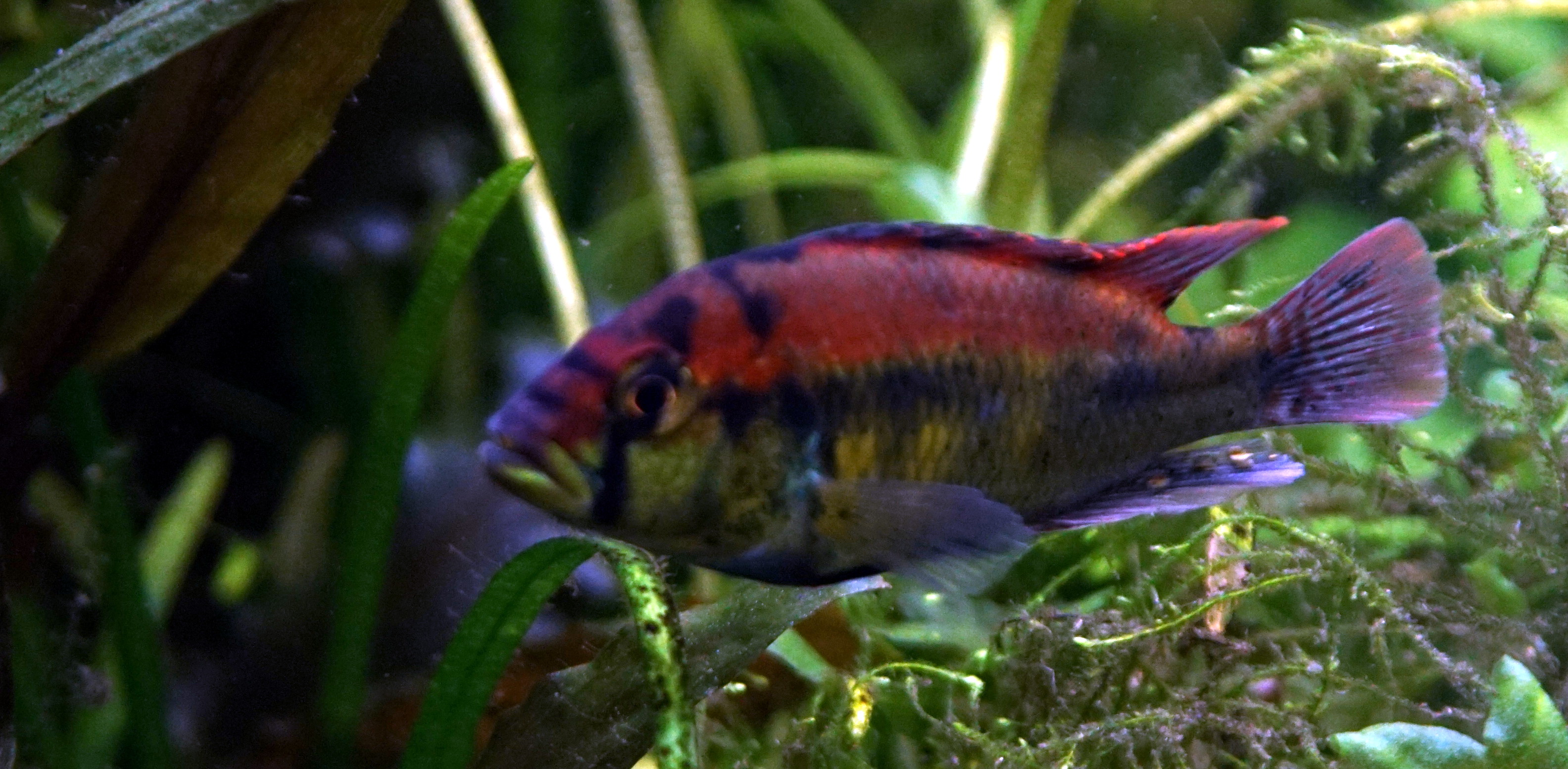

Conservation status
- Vulnerable (IUCN 3.1)

Scientific classification
- Kingdom: Animalia
- Phylum: Chordata
- Class: Actinopterygii
- Order: Cichliformes
- Family: Cichlidae
- Genus: Haplochromis
- Species: H. aeneocolor

Binomial name
- Haplochromis aeneocolor Greenwood, 1973

Synonyms
- Astatotilapia aeneocolor (Greenwood, 1973)

= Haplochromis aeneocolor =

Species of fish

Haplochromis aeneocolor is a species of cichlid endemic to Uganda where it is found in Lake George and the Kazinga Channel. This species can reach a length of 7.5 centimetres (3.0 in) SL.
