= Haplochromis decticostoma =

Conservation status
- Data Deficient (IUCN 3.1)

Scientific classification
- Kingdom: Animalia
- Phylum: Chordata
- Class: Actinopterygii
- Order: Cichliformes
- Family: Cichlidae
- Genus: Haplochromis
- Species: H. decticostoma

Binomial name
- Haplochromis decticostoma Greenwood & Gee, 1969

Synonyms
- Prognathochromis decticostoma (Greenwood & Gee, 1969)

Species of fish

Haplochromis decticostoma is a species of cichlid endemic to Lake Victoria. This species grows to a length of 22.9 centimetres (9.0 in) SL.
