= Haplochromis apogonoides =

Conservation status
- Critically endangered, possibly extinct (IUCN 3.1)

Scientific classification
- Kingdom: Animalia
- Phylum: Chordata
- Class: Actinopterygii
- Order: Cichliformes
- Family: Cichlidae
- Genus: Haplochromis
- Species: H. apogonoides

Binomial name
- Haplochromis apogonoides Greenwood, 1967

Species of fish

Haplochromis apogonoides is a species of cichlid endemic to Lake Victoria, but has not been seen since 1983. It may be extinct, but is maintained as Critically Endangered by the IUCN in the small chance that a tiny –but currently unknown– population survives. This species can reach a length of 13.2 centimetres (5.2 in) SL.
