= Haplochromis oregosoma =

Conservation status
- Near Threatened (IUCN 3.1)

Scientific classification
- Kingdom: Animalia
- Phylum: Chordata
- Class: Actinopterygii
- Order: Cichliformes
- Family: Cichlidae
- Genus: Haplochromis
- Species: H. oregosoma

Binomial name
- Haplochromis oregosoma Greenwood, 1973

Synonyms
- Astatotilapia oregosoma (Greenwood, 1973)

Species of fish

Haplochromis oregosoma is a species of cichlid endemic to Uganda where it occurs in Lake George (Uganda) and the Kazinga Channel. This species can reach a length of 7.3 centimetres (2.9 in) SL.
