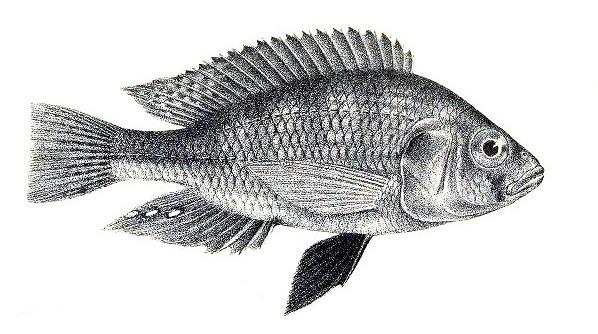

Conservation status
- Critically endangered, possibly extinct (IUCN 3.1)

Scientific classification
- Kingdom: Animalia
- Phylum: Chordata
- Class: Actinopterygii
- Order: Cichliformes
- Family: Cichlidae
- Genus: Haplochromis
- Species: H. victorianus

Binomial name
- Haplochromis victorianus (Pellegrin, 1904)

Synonyms
- Paratilapia victoriana Pellegrin, 1904: Harpagochromis victorianus (Pellegrin, 1904)

= Haplochromis victorianus =

Species of fish

Haplochromis victorianus is a species of cichlid endemic to Lake Victoria. It is critically endangered, though it may now be extinct. This species reaches a length of 16.6 centimetres (6.5 in) SL.
