= Haplochromis mandibularis =

Conservation status
- Data Deficient (IUCN 3.1)

Scientific classification
- Kingdom: Animalia
- Phylum: Chordata
- Class: Actinopterygii
- Order: Cichliformes
- Family: Cichlidae
- Genus: Haplochromis
- Species: H. mandibularis

Binomial name
- Haplochromis mandibularis Greenwood, 1962

Synonyms
- Prognathochromis mandibularis (Greenwood, 1962)

Species of fish

Haplochromis mandibularis is a species of cichlid endemic to Lake Victoria. This species can reach a length of 17.4 centimetres (6.9 in) SL.
