= Haplochromis paucidens =

Conservation status
- Least Concern (IUCN 3.1)

Scientific classification
- Kingdom: Animalia
- Phylum: Chordata
- Class: Actinopterygii
- Order: Cichliformes
- Family: Cichlidae
- Genus: Haplochromis
- Species: H. paucidens

Binomial name
- Haplochromis paucidens Regan, 1921

Synonyms
- Astatotilapia paucidens (Regan, 1921); Paralabidochromis paucidens (Regan, 1921); Haplochromis schoutedeni Poll, 1932; Haplochromis wittei Poll, 1939

Species of fish

Haplochromis paucidens is a species of fish in the family Cichlidae. It is found in the Democratic Republic of the Congo and Rwanda. Its natural habitat is freshwater lakes.
