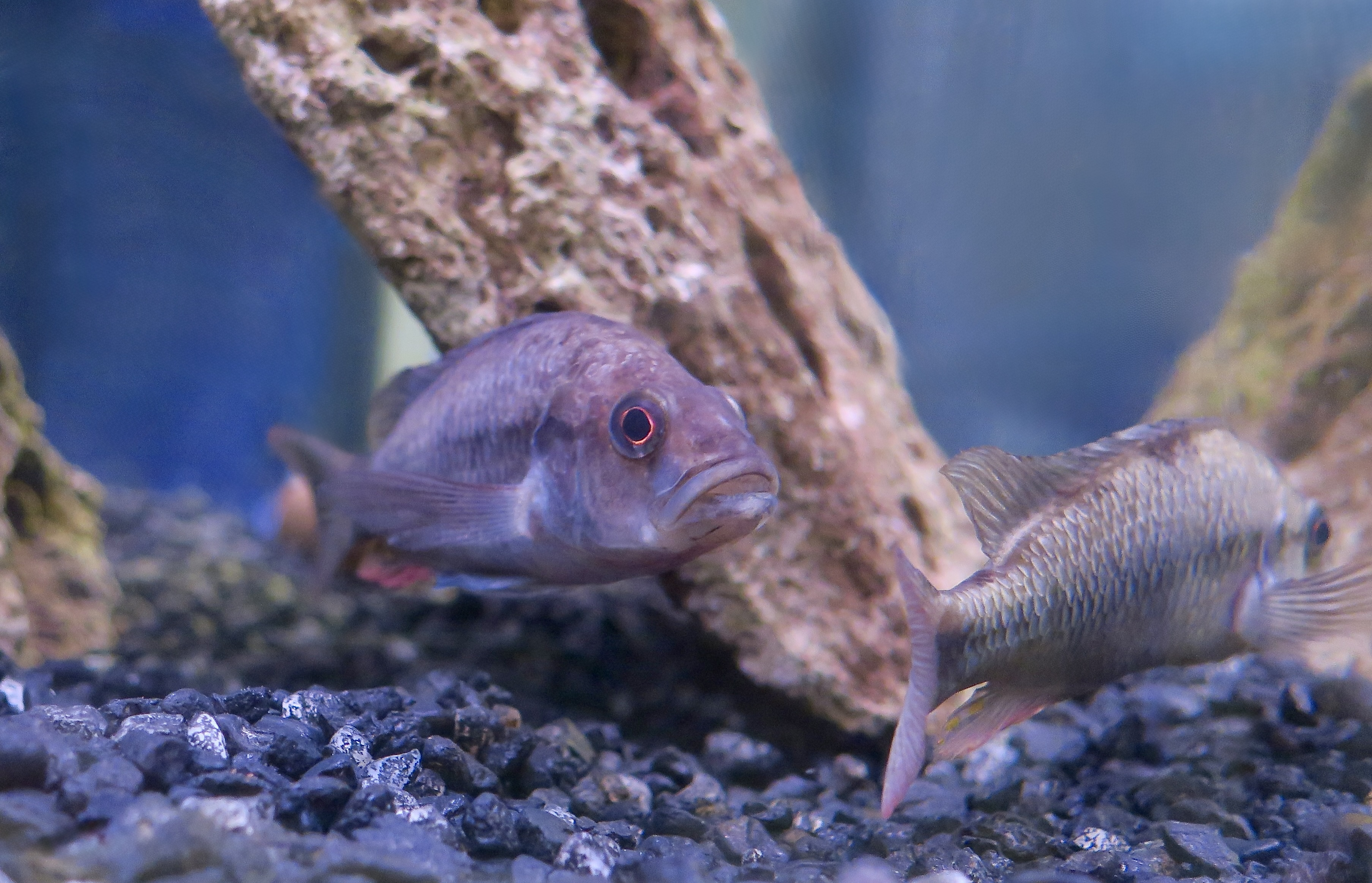
- At New York Aquarium.

Conservation status
- Critically endangered, possibly extinct (IUCN 3.1)

Scientific classification
- Kingdom: Animalia
- Phylum: Chordata
- Class: Actinopterygii
- Order: Cichliformes
- Family: Cichlidae
- Genus: Haplochromis
- Species: H. perrieri

Binomial name
- Haplochromis perrieri (Pellegrin, 1909)

Synonyms
- Tilapia perrieri Pellegrin, 1909; Prognathochromis perrieri (Pellegrin, 1909)

= Haplochromis perrieri =

Species of fish

Haplochromis perrieri is a species of cichlid endemic to Lake Victoria that may now be extinct in the wild. These fish are part of the Lake Victoria Species Survival Program, and captive populations exist within the public aquarium community. This species can reach a length of 6 centimetres (2.4 in) SL. This species' specific name honours the French zoologist Edmond Perrier (1844-1921) who was the director of Muséum National d'Histoire Naturelle from 1900–1919.
