= Haplochromis paraplagiostoma =

Conservation status
- Data Deficient (IUCN 3.1)

Scientific classification
- Kingdom: Animalia
- Phylum: Chordata
- Class: Actinopterygii
- Order: Cichliformes
- Family: Cichlidae
- Genus: Haplochromis
- Species: H. paraplagiostoma

Binomial name
- Haplochromis paraplagiostoma Greenwood & Gee, 1969

Synonyms
- Harpagochromis paraplagiostoma (Greenwood & Gee, 1969)

Species of fish

Haplochromis paraplagiostoma was a species of cichlid endemic to Lake Victoria. This species could reach a length of 9.8 centimetres (3.9 in) SL. The species is now presumed extinct.
