= Haplochromis piceatus =

Conservation status
- Vulnerable (IUCN 3.1)

Scientific classification
- Kingdom: Animalia
- Phylum: Chordata
- Class: Actinopterygii
- Order: Cichliformes
- Family: Cichlidae
- Genus: Haplochromis
- Species: H. piceatus

Binomial name
- Haplochromis piceatus Greenwood & Gee, 1969

Synonyms
- Astatotilapia piceata (Greenwood & Gee, 1969); Astatotilapia piceatus (Greenwood & Gee, 1969)

Species of fish

Haplochromis piceatus is a species of cichlid fish endemic to Lake Victoria in East Africa. Although listed as vulnerable by the IUCN, since 2005, surveys have failed to find them in their home lake and they are possibly extinct in the wild. Captive "safety populations" are maintained at several public aquariums.

This species can reach a standard length of 9 cm (3.5 in). Males are bluish-black with orange fins and females are grayish. The species generally resembles H. cinereus and H. macrops, also from Lake Victoria, but they differs in having a longer jaw and a higher gill raker count. In the wild they are typically found over muddy bottoms at depths of about 14–18 m (46–59 ft) where they feed on zooplankton and insect larvae, but in captivity they will eat a wide range of standard aquarium fish food.
