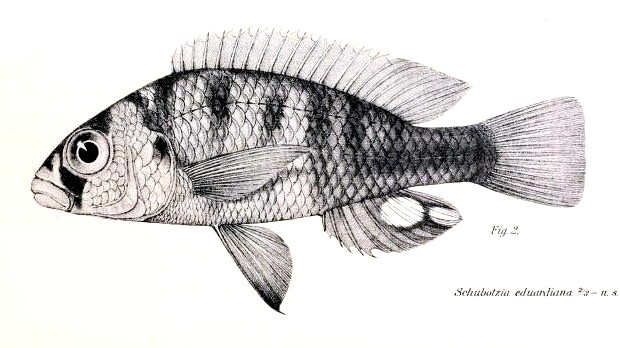

Conservation status
- Least Concern (IUCN 3.1)

Scientific classification
- Kingdom: Animalia
- Phylum: Chordata
- Class: Actinopterygii
- Order: Cichliformes
- Family: Cichlidae
- Genus: Haplochromis
- Species: H. eduardianus

Binomial name
- Haplochromis eduardianus (Boulenger, 1914)

Synonyms
- Schubotzia eduardiana Boulenger, 1914

= Haplochromis eduardianus =

Species of fish

Haplochromis eduardianus is a species of cichlid endemic to Uganda where it is found in Lake George, Lake Edward and the Kazinga Channel. This species can reach a length of 7.9 centimetres (3.1 in) SL.
