= Haplochromis parorthostoma =

Conservation status
- Data Deficient (IUCN 3.1)

Scientific classification
- Kingdom: Animalia
- Phylum: Chordata
- Class: Actinopterygii
- Order: Cichliformes
- Family: Cichlidae
- Genus: Haplochromis
- Species: H. parorthostoma

Binomial name
- Haplochromis parorthostoma Greenwood, 1967

Synonyms
- Pyxichromis parorthostoma (Greenwood, 1967)

Species of fish

Haplochromis parorthostoma is a species of cichlid endemic to Lake Victoria where it is known from areas with hard substrates. This species can reach a length of 11.7 centimetres (4.6 in) SL.
