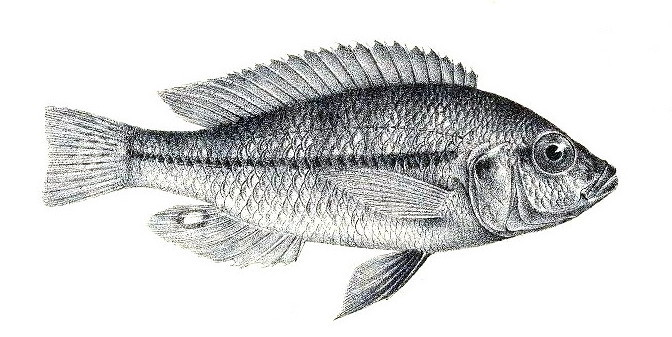

Conservation status
- Critically endangered, possibly extinct (IUCN 3.1)

Scientific classification
- Kingdom: Animalia
- Phylum: Chordata
- Class: Actinopterygii
- Order: Cichliformes
- Family: Cichlidae
- Genus: Haplochromis
- Species: H. granti

Binomial name
- Haplochromis granti Boulenger, 1906

= Haplochromis granti =

Species of fish

Haplochromis granti is a species of cichlid endemic to Lake Victoria, though it may now be extinct. This species can reach a length of 12.2 centimetres (4.8 in) SL. The specific name honours the Scottish naturalist and explorer James Augustus Grant (1827-1892) who was the co-discoverer of Lake Victoria's role as a major source of the Nile, alongside John Henning Speke.
