= Haplochromis saxicola =

Conservation status
- Data Deficient (IUCN 3.1)

Scientific classification
- Kingdom: Animalia
- Phylum: Chordata
- Class: Actinopterygii
- Order: Cichliformes
- Family: Cichlidae
- Genus: Haplochromis
- Species: H. saxicola

Binomial name
- Haplochromis saxicola Greenwood, 1960

Synonyms
- Psammochromis saxicola (Greenwood, 1960)

Species of fish

Haplochromis saxicola is a species of cichlid found in Lake Victoria and may possibly occur in the adjacent reaches of the Nile. This species reaches a length of 12.3 centimetres (4.8 in) SL.
