= Haplochromis rubescens =

Conservation status
- Least Concern (IUCN 3.1)

Scientific classification
- Kingdom: Animalia
- Phylum: Chordata
- Class: Actinopterygii
- Order: Cichliformes
- Family: Cichlidae
- Genus: Haplochromis
- Species: H. rubescens

Binomial name
- Haplochromis rubescens Snoeks, 1994

Species of fish

Haplochromis rubescens is a species of cichlid endemic to the Rwandan portions of Lake Kivu. This species can reach a length of 11.4 centimetres (4.5 in) SL.
