= Haplochromis sp. 'Chala' =

Conservation status
- Data Deficient (IUCN 3.1)

Scientific classification
- Kingdom: Animalia
- Phylum: Chordata
- Class: Actinopterygii
- Order: Cichliformes
- Family: Cichlidae
- Subfamily: Pseudocrenilabrinae
- Genus: Haplochromis
- Species: H. sp. 'Chala'

Binomial name
- Haplochromis sp. 'Chala'

Species of fish

Haplochromis sp. 'Chala' is a species of fish in the family Cichlidae. It is found in Kenya and Tanzania. Its natural habitat is freshwater lakes.
