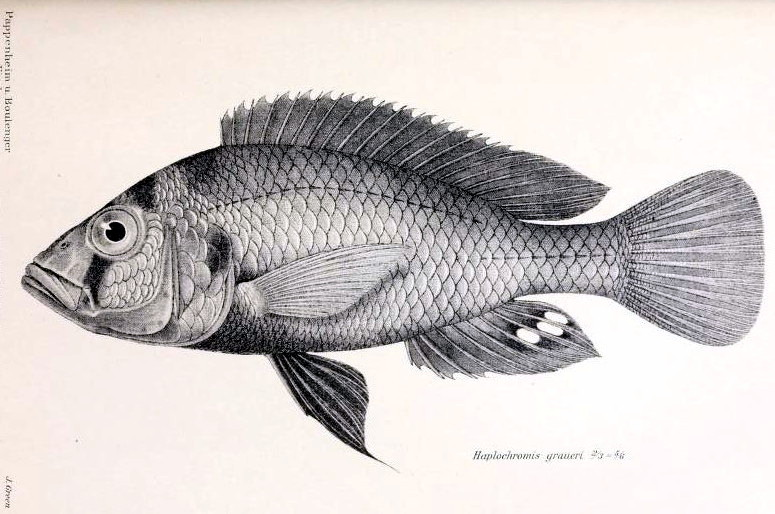

Conservation status
- Least Concern (IUCN 3.1)

Scientific classification
- Kingdom: Animalia
- Phylum: Chordata
- Class: Actinopterygii
- Order: Cichliformes
- Family: Cichlidae
- Genus: Haplochromis
- Species: H. graueri

Binomial name
- Haplochromis graueri Boulenger, 1914

= Haplochromis graueri =

Species of fish

Haplochromis graueri is a species of cichlid endemic to Lake Kivu on the border of the Democratic Republic of the Congo, and Rwanda. This species can reach a length of 11.8 centimetres (4.6 in) SL.
