= Haplochromis cyaneus =

Conservation status
- Endangered (IUCN 3.1)

Scientific classification
- Kingdom: Animalia
- Phylum: Chordata
- Class: Actinopterygii
- Order: Cichliformes
- Family: Cichlidae
- Genus: Haplochromis
- Species: H. cyaneus

Binomial name
- Haplochromis cyaneus Seehausen, Bouton & Zwennes, 1998

Species of fish

Haplochromis sp. nov. "Blue Rockpicker" is a species of cichlid endemic to the Tanzanian part of Lake Victoria. Its natural habitat is freshwater lakes. This species grows to a length of 10.7 centimetres (4.2 in) SL.

This species is medium-sized and has a steep, slightly indented dorsal head profile with a small mouth which has forceps like teeth. It has an obvious pattern of longitudinal stripes and vertical bars. It is sexually dimorphic with the sexes differing on colourat and the length of the head.

This species is only found over rocky substrates, where lives and feeds on the surface of rocky lake beds or shores which are exposed to the action of the waves and it has never been observed or collected in crevices, and it has rarely been collected in sheltered bays. Its main food is the larvae of chironomid larvae which it forages for among algal filaments growing on the surface of rocks. This species is a polygynous maternal mouthbrooder.

The name Haplochromis cyanues was applied to this species by Seehausen, Bouton & Zwennes but according to Eschmeyer this name is not valid. Ethelwynn Trewavas used that name to describe a cichlid from Lake Malawi, Haplochromis cyaneus Trewavas, 1935, a name that is no longer valid, the valid name for that species is now Copadichromis cyaneus. However, the species this article is about is the species described by Seehausen, Bouton & Zwennes, which has no valid name at the moment. However, FishBase appears to argue that according to the International Code of Zoological Nomenclature a replacement name is unnecessary and Haplochromis cyaneus can be used for this species. A further caveat is that Catalog of Fishes states that this species may not be within the genus Haplochromis.
