= Haplochromis lividus =

Conservation status
- Data Deficient (IUCN 3.1)

Scientific classification
- Kingdom: Animalia
- Phylum: Chordata
- Class: Actinopterygii
- Order: Cichliformes
- Family: Cichlidae
- Genus: Haplochromis
- Species: H. lividus

Binomial name
- Haplochromis lividus Greenwood, 1956

Species of fish

Haplochromis lividus is a species of cichlid endemic to Lake Victoria. This species can reach a length of 9 centimetres (3.5 in) SL.
