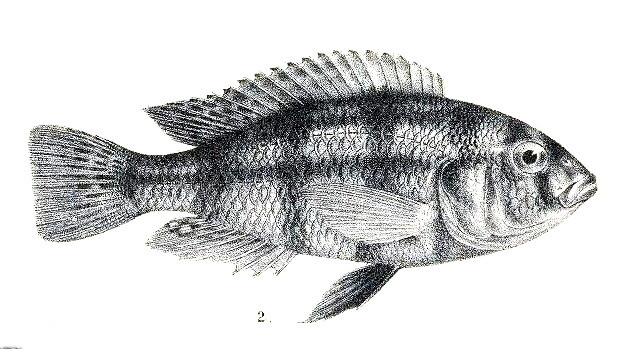

Conservation status
- Vulnerable (IUCN 3.1)

Scientific classification
- Kingdom: Animalia
- Phylum: Chordata
- Class: Actinopterygii
- Order: Cichliformes
- Family: Cichlidae
- Subfamily: Pseudocrenilabrinae
- Genus: Haplochromis
- Species: H. retrodens

Binomial name
- Haplochromis retrodens (Hilgendorf, 1888)

Synonyms
- Paratilapia retrodens Hilgendorf, 1888; Haplochromis retrodens (Hilgendorf, 1888); Hemichromis retrodens (Hilgendorf, 1888); Hoplotilapia retrodens (Hilgendorf, 1888); Paratilapia polyodon Boulenger, 1909; Cnestrostoma polyodon (Boulenger, 1909)

= Haplochromis retrodens =

Species of fish

Haplochromis retrodens is a species of cichlid fish endemic to Lake Victoria in East Africa. The species is a representative of the genus Haplochromis,

The species was common until the mid-1980s where it rapidly declined. It was listed by the IUCN as extinct in 1996, though Harrison and Stiassny (1999) considered its status unresolved. The conservation status was reassessed in 2010 and the IUCN now list it as vulnerable. There were no records of the species between 1991 and 2004 and later records have been very few, including an individual seen in 2010.
