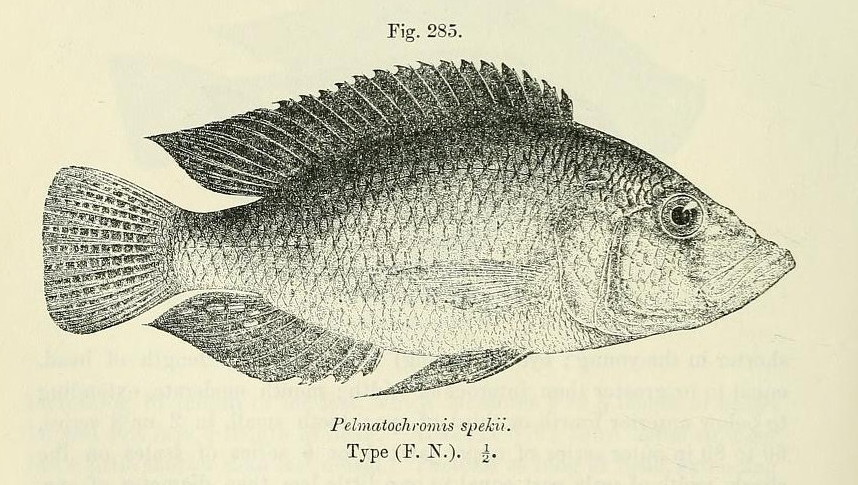

Conservation status
- Data Deficient (IUCN 3.1)

Scientific classification
- Kingdom: Animalia
- Phylum: Chordata
- Class: Actinopterygii
- Order: Cichliformes
- Family: Cichlidae
- Genus: Haplochromis
- Species: H. spekii

Binomial name
- Haplochromis spekii (Boulenger, 1906)

Synonyms
- Harpagochromis spekii (Boulenger, 1906); Pelmatochromis spekii Boulenger, 1906; Paratilapia serranus (Pfeffer, 1896); Haplochromis serranoides Regan, 1922

= Haplochromis spekii =

Species of fish

Haplochromis spekii is a species of cichlid found in Lake Victoria and the adjacent reaches of the Nile. This species reaches a length of 22 centimetres (8.7 in) SL. The specific name of this species honours John Henning Speke (1827-1864), the English explorer who, with James Augustus Grant, discovered a major source of the Nile was Lake Victoria.
