= Haplochromis gracilior =

Conservation status
- Least Concern (IUCN 3.1)

Scientific classification
- Kingdom: Animalia
- Phylum: Chordata
- Class: Actinopterygii
- Order: Cichliformes
- Family: Cichlidae
- Genus: Haplochromis
- Species: H. gracilior

Binomial name
- Haplochromis gracilior Boulenger, 1914

Species of fish

Haplochromis gracilior, known in Rwanda as the Boulenger's Kivu haplo and in the aquarium fish trade as Haplochromis 'torpedo stripe', is a species of cichlid fish endemic to Lake Kivu on the border of the Democratic Republic of the Congo and Rwanda. This species can reach a length of 10.4 centimetres (4.1 in) SL.
