= Haplochromis mylodon =

Conservation status
- Least Concern (IUCN 3.1)

Scientific classification
- Kingdom: Animalia
- Phylum: Chordata
- Class: Actinopterygii
- Order: Cichliformes
- Family: Cichlidae
- Genus: Haplochromis
- Species: H. mylodon

Binomial name
- Haplochromis mylodon Greenwood, 1973

Synonyms
- Labrochromis mylodon (Greenwood, 1973)

Species of fish

Haplochromis mylodon is a species of cichlid found in the Democratic Republic of the Congo and Uganda where it occurs in the Kazinga Channel, Lake George and Lake Edward. This species can reach a length of 11.5 centimetres (4.5 in) SL.
