= Haplochromis heusinkveldi =

Conservation status
- Critically endangered, possibly extinct (IUCN 3.1)

Scientific classification
- Kingdom: Animalia
- Phylum: Chordata
- Class: Actinopterygii
- Order: Cichliformes
- Family: Cichlidae
- Genus: Haplochromis
- Species: H. heusinkveldi

Binomial name
- Haplochromis heusinkveldi F. Wittee & Witte-Maas, 1987

Species of fish

Haplochromis heusinkveldi is a species of cichlid endemic to Lake Victoria though it may now be extinct. This species can reach a length of 7.6 centimetres (3.0 in) SL.
