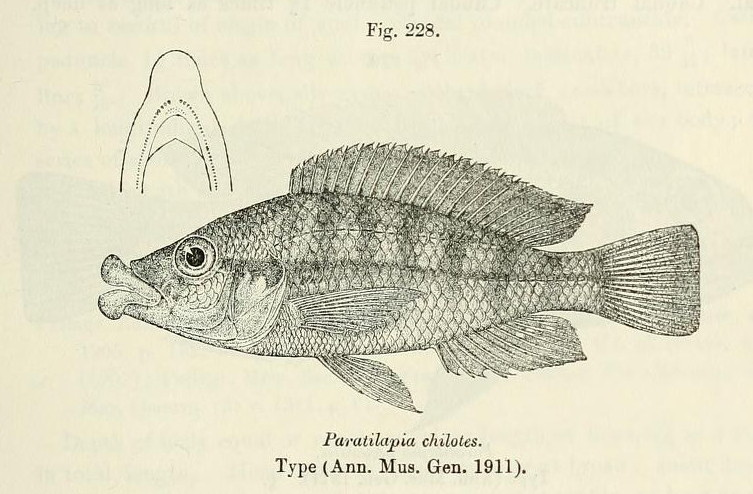

Conservation status
- Least Concern (IUCN 3.1)

Scientific classification
- Kingdom: Animalia
- Phylum: Chordata
- Class: Actinopterygii
- Order: Cichliformes
- Family: Cichlidae
- Genus: Haplochromis
- Species: H. chilotes

Binomial name
- Haplochromis chilotes (Boulenger, 1911)

Synonyms
- Paratilapia chilotes Boulenger, 1911; Paralabidochromis chilotes (Boulenger, 1911)

= Haplochromis chilotes =

Species of fish

Haplochromis chilotes is a species of cichlid endemic to Lake Victoria. This species grows to a length of 14.8 centimetres (5.8 in) SL.
