= Haplochromis paraguiarti =

Conservation status
- Data Deficient (IUCN 3.1)

Scientific classification
- Kingdom: Animalia
- Phylum: Chordata
- Class: Actinopterygii
- Order: Cichliformes
- Family: Cichlidae
- Genus: Haplochromis
- Species: H. paraguiarti

Binomial name
- Haplochromis paraguiarti Greenwood, 1967

Synonyms
- Prognathochromis paraguiarti (Greenwood, 1967)

Species of fish

Haplochromis paraguiarti is a species of cichlid endemic to Lake Victoria. This species can reach a length of 15.6 centimetres (6.1 in) SL.
