= Haplochromis cryptodon =

Conservation status
- Data Deficient (IUCN 3.1)

Scientific classification
- Kingdom: Animalia
- Phylum: Chordata
- Class: Actinopterygii
- Order: Cichliformes
- Family: Cichlidae
- Genus: Haplochromis
- Species: H. cryptodon

Binomial name
- Haplochromis cryptodon Greenwood, 1959

Synonyms
- Lipochromis cryptodon (Greenwood, 1959)

Species of fish

Haplochromis cryptodon is a species of cichlid endemic to Lake Victoria. This species grows to a length of 13 centimetres (5.1 in) SL.
