= Haplochromis paradoxus =

Conservation status
- Data Deficient (IUCN 3.1)

Scientific classification
- Kingdom: Animalia
- Phylum: Chordata
- Class: Actinopterygii
- Order: Cichliformes
- Family: Cichlidae
- Genus: Haplochromis
- Species: H. paradoxus

Binomial name
- Haplochromis paradoxus (Lippitsch & Kaufman, 2003)

Synonyms
- Pyxichromis paradoxus Lippitsch & Kaufman, 2003

Species of fish

Haplochromis paradoxus is a species of haplochromine cichlid endemic to Lake Edward where it is known to be benthopelagic. This species can reach a length of 7.4 centimetres (2.9 in) SL.
