= Haplochromis nanoserranus =

Conservation status
- Critically endangered, possibly extinct (IUCN 3.1)

Scientific classification
- Kingdom: Animalia
- Phylum: Chordata
- Class: Actinopterygii
- Order: Cichliformes
- Family: Cichlidae
- Genus: Haplochromis
- Species: H. nanoserranus

Binomial name
- Haplochromis nanoserranus Greenwood & Barel, 1978

Synonyms
- Prognathochromis nanoserranus (Greenwood & Barel, 1978)

Species of fish

Haplochromis nanoserranus is a species of cichlid endemic to Lake Victoria. It is critically endangered, though it may be extinct. This species can reach a length of 7.6 centimetres (3.0 in) SL.
