= Haplochromis dichrourus =

Conservation status
- Critically endangered, possibly extinct (IUCN 3.1)

Scientific classification
- Kingdom: Animalia
- Phylum: Chordata
- Class: Actinopterygii
- Order: Cichliformes
- Family: Cichlidae
- Genus: Haplochromis
- Species: H. dichrourus

Binomial name
- Haplochromis dichrourus Regan, 1922

Synonyms
- Prognathochromis dichrourus (Regan, 1922)

Species of fish

Haplochromis dichrourus is a species of cichlid endemic to Lake Victoria, but has not been seen since 1986. This species grows to a length of 18.6 centimetres (7.3 in) SL. It may be extinct, but is maintained as Critically Endangered by the IUCN in the small chance that a tiny –but currently unknown– population survives.
