= Haplochromis labiatus =

Conservation status
- Near Threatened (IUCN 3.1)

Scientific classification
- Kingdom: Animalia
- Phylum: Chordata
- Class: Actinopterygii
- Order: Cichliformes
- Family: Cichlidae
- Genus: Haplochromis
- Species: H. labiatus

Binomial name
- Haplochromis labiatus Trewavas 1933

Synonyms
- Paralabidochromis labiatus (Trewavas, 1933)

Species of fish

Haplochromis labiatus is a species of cichlid found in the Democratic Republic of the Congo and Uganda where it is found in Lake Edward and Lake George. This species can reach a length of 10.9 centimetres (4.3 in) SL.
