= Haplochromis squamipinnis =

Conservation status
- Least Concern (IUCN 3.1)

Scientific classification
- Kingdom: Animalia
- Phylum: Chordata
- Class: Actinopterygii
- Order: Cichliformes
- Family: Cichlidae
- Genus: Haplochromis
- Species: H. squamipinnis

Binomial name
- Haplochromis squamipinnis Regan, 1921

Synonyms
- Harpagochromis squamipinnis (Regan, 1921)

Species of fish

Haplochromis squamipinnis is a species of cichlid found in the Democratic Republic of the Congo and Uganda where it occurs in Lake George, Lake Edward and the Kazinga Channel. This species reaches a length of 20.2 centimetres (8.0 in) SL.
