= Haplochromis mylergates =

Conservation status
- Critically endangered, possibly extinct (IUCN 3.1)

Scientific classification
- Kingdom: Animalia
- Phylum: Chordata
- Class: Actinopterygii
- Order: Cichliformes
- Family: Cichlidae
- Genus: Haplochromis
- Species: H. mylergates

Binomial name
- Haplochromis mylergates Greenwood & Barel, 1978

Synonyms
- Labrochromis mylergates (Greenwood & Barel, 1978)

Species of cichlid fish

Haplochromis mylergates is a species of cichlid endemic to Lake Victoria. It is critically endangered, though it may now be extinct. This species can reach a length of 13.7 centimetres (5.4 in) SL.
