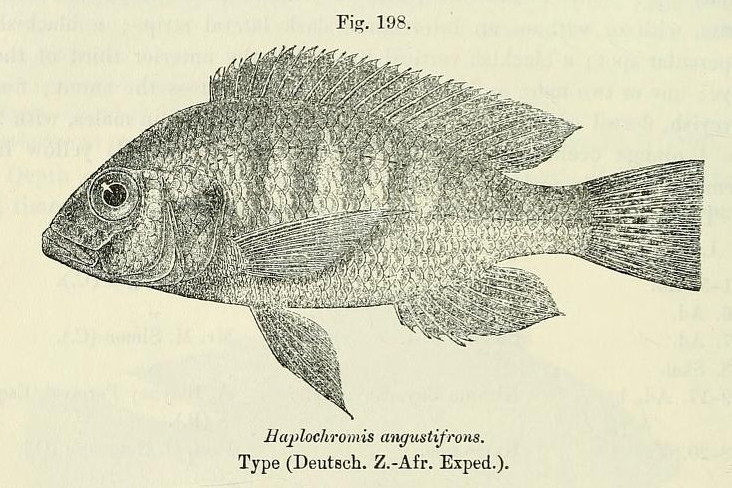

Conservation status
- Least Concern (IUCN 3.1)

Scientific classification
- Kingdom: Animalia
- Phylum: Chordata
- Class: Actinopterygii
- Order: Cichliformes
- Family: Cichlidae
- Genus: Haplochromis
- Species: H. angustifrons

Binomial name
- Haplochromis angustifrons Boulenger, 1914

Synonyms
- Gaurochromis angustifrons (Boulenger, 1914)

= Haplochromis angustifrons =

Species of fish

Haplochromis angustifrons is a species of cichlid endemic to Uganda where it is found in Lake George, Lake Edward and the Kazinga Channel. This species reaches a length of 9 centimetres (3.5 in) SL.
