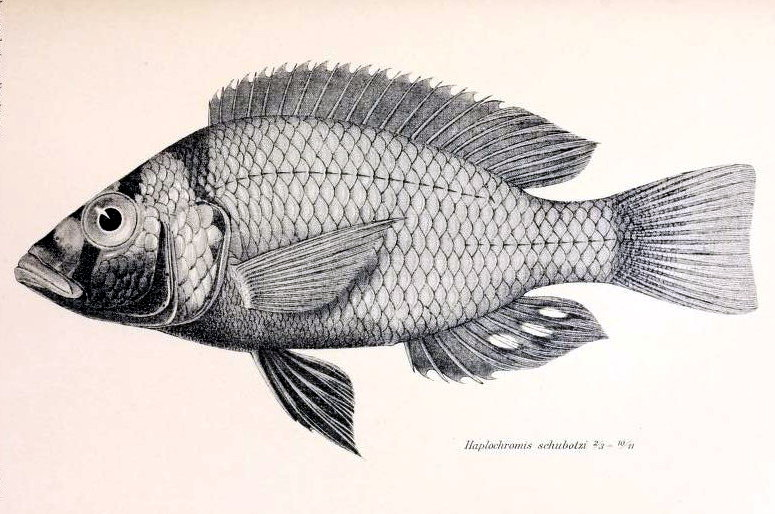

Conservation status
- Least Concern (IUCN 3.1)

Scientific classification
- Kingdom: Animalia
- Phylum: Chordata
- Class: Actinopterygii
- Order: Cichliformes
- Family: Cichlidae
- Genus: Haplochromis
- Species: H. schubotzi

Binomial name
- Haplochromis schubotzi Boulenger, 1914

Synonyms
- Psammochromis schubotzi (Boulenger, 1914)

= Haplochromis schubotzi =

Species of fish

Haplochromis schubotzi is a species of cichlid native to the Democratic Republic of the Congo and Uganda, where it inhabits Lake George, Lake Edward, and the Kazinga Channel. This species reaches a length of 12.5 centimetres (4.9 in) SL. Its specific name honours German zoologist Johann G. Hermann Schubotz (1881-1955), a member of the Deutsche Zentral-Afrika Expedition of 1907–1908, during which he collected many fish specimens, including the type of this species.
