= Haplochromis maculipinna =

Conservation status
- Data Deficient (IUCN 3.1)

Scientific classification
- Kingdom: Animalia
- Phylum: Chordata
- Class: Actinopterygii
- Order: Cichliformes
- Family: Cichlidae
- Genus: Haplochromis
- Species: H. maculipinna

Binomial name
- Haplochromis maculipinna (Pellegrin, 1913)

Synonyms
- Paratilapia maculipinna Pellegrin, 1913; Harpagochromis maculipinna (Pellegrin, 1913)

Species of fish

Haplochromis maculipinna is a species of cichlid endemic to Lake Victoria. This species can reach a length of 16.6 centimetres (6.5 in) SL.
