= Haplochromis boops =

Conservation status
- Data Deficient (IUCN 3.1)

Scientific classification
- Kingdom: Animalia
- Phylum: Chordata
- Class: Actinopterygii
- Order: Cichliformes
- Family: Cichlidae
- Genus: Haplochromis
- Species: H. boops

Binomial name
- Haplochromis boops Greenwood, 1967

Synonyms
- Harpagochromis boops (Greenwood, 1967)

Species of fish

Haplochromis boops is a species of cichlid endemic to Lake Victoria. This species can reach a length of 19.4 centimetres (7.6 in) SL.
