= Haplochromis pachycephalus =

Conservation status
- Data Deficient (IUCN 3.1)

Scientific classification
- Kingdom: Animalia
- Phylum: Chordata
- Class: Actinopterygii
- Order: Cichliformes
- Family: Cichlidae
- Genus: Haplochromis
- Species: H. pachycephalus

Binomial name
- Haplochromis pachycephalus Greenwood, 1967

Synonyms
- Harpagochromis pachycephalus (Greenwood, 1967)

Species of fish

Haplochromis pachycephalus is a species of cichlid endemic to Lake Victoria. This species can reach a length of 23.2 centimetres (9.1 in) SL.
