= Haplochromis plagiostoma =

Conservation status
- Data Deficient (IUCN 3.1)

Scientific classification
- Kingdom: Animalia
- Phylum: Chordata
- Class: Actinopterygii
- Order: Cichliformes
- Family: Cichlidae
- Genus: Haplochromis
- Species: H. plagiostoma

Binomial name
- Haplochromis plagiostoma Regan,1922

Synonyms
- Harpagochromis plagiostoma (Regan, 1922)

Species of fish

Haplochromis plagiostoma is a species of cichlid endemic to Lake Victoria. This species can reach a length of 14.7 centimetres (5.8 in) SL.
