= Haplochromis macconneli =

Conservation status
- Least Concern (IUCN 3.1)

Scientific classification
- Kingdom: Animalia
- Phylum: Chordata
- Class: Actinopterygii
- Order: Cichliformes
- Family: Cichlidae
- Genus: Haplochromis
- Species: H. macconneli

Binomial name
- Haplochromis macconneli Greenwood, 1974

Synonyms
- Thoracochromis macconneli (Greenwood, 1974)

Species of fish

Haplochromis macconneli is a species of cichlid endemic to Lake Turkana, northern Kenya. This species can reach a length of 7.7 centimetres (3.0 in) SL. The specific name honours the Officer in Charge of the Fisheries Department at Lake Rudolf (now known as Lake Turkana), R. B. McConnell, for the assistance he gave to the Lake Rudolf Research Project.
