= Haplochromis sp. 'backflash cryptodon' =

Conservation status
- Critically Endangered (IUCN 2.3)

Scientific classification
- Kingdom: Animalia
- Phylum: Chordata
- Class: Actinopterygii
- Order: Cichliformes
- Family: Cichlidae
- Subfamily: Pseudocrenilabrinae
- Genus: Haplochromis
- Species: H. sp. 'backflash cryptodon'

Binomial name
- Haplochromis sp. 'backflash cryptodon'

Species of fish

Haplochromis sp. 'backflash cryptodon' is a species of fish in the family Cichlidae. It is endemic to Uganda.
