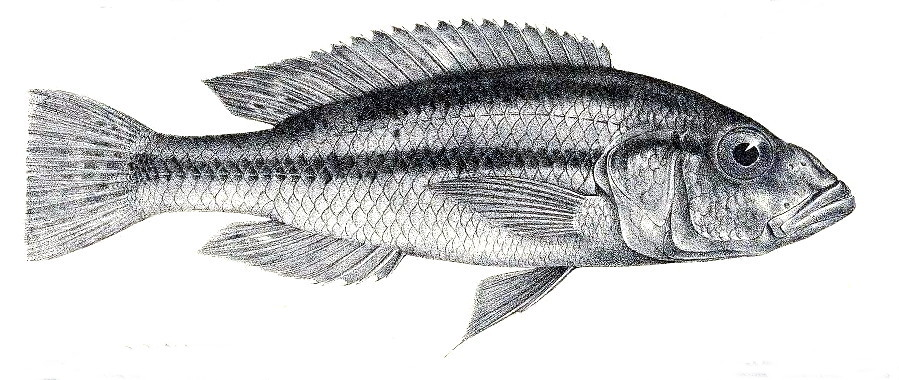

Conservation status
- Data Deficient (IUCN 3.1)

Scientific classification
- Kingdom: Animalia
- Phylum: Chordata
- Class: Actinopterygii
- Order: Cichliformes
- Family: Cichlidae
- Genus: Haplochromis
- Species: H. serranus

Binomial name
- Haplochromis serranus (Pfeffer, 1896)

Synonyms
- Haplochromis serranus (Pfeffer, 1896); Hemichromis serranus Pfeffer, 1896; Harpagochromis serranus (Pfeffer, 1896); Paratilapia serranus (Pfeffer, 1896); Haplochromis acutirostris Regan, 1922

= Haplochromis serranus =

Species of fish

Haplochromis serranus is a species of cichlid endemic to Lake Victoria. This species reaches a length of 20.5 centimetres (8.1 in) SL.
