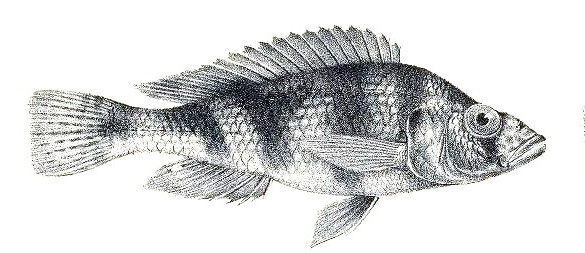

Conservation status
- Critically endangered, possibly extinct (IUCN 3.1)

Scientific classification
- Kingdom: Animalia
- Phylum: Chordata
- Class: Actinopterygii
- Order: Cichliformes
- Family: Cichlidae
- Genus: Haplochromis
- Species: H. percoides

Binomial name
- Haplochromis percoides Boulenger, 1906

Synonyms
- Prognathochromis percoides (Boulenger, 1906); Astatilapia percoides (Boulenger, 1906)

= Haplochromis percoides =

Species of fish

Haplochromis percoides is a species of cichlid endemic to Lake Victoria. It is critically endangered, though it may now be extinct. This species can reach a length of 9.3 centimetres (3.7 in) SL.
