= Haplochromis dentex =

Conservation status
- Critically endangered, possibly extinct (IUCN 3.1)

Scientific classification
- Kingdom: Animalia
- Phylum: Chordata
- Class: Actinopterygii
- Order: Cichliformes
- Family: Cichlidae
- Genus: Haplochromis
- Species: H. dentex

Binomial name
- Haplochromis dentex Regan, 1922

Synonyms
- Prognathochromis dentex (Regan, 1922)

Species of fish

Haplochromis dentex is a species of cichlid endemic to Lake Victoria, but has not been seen since 1987. It may be extinct, but is maintained as Critically Endangered by the IUCN in the small chance that a tiny –but currently unknown– population survives. This species grows to a length of 15.9 centimetres (6.3 in) SL.
