= Haplochromis nyanzae =

Conservation status
- Data Deficient (IUCN 3.1)

Scientific classification
- Kingdom: Animalia
- Phylum: Chordata
- Class: Actinopterygii
- Order: Cichliformes
- Family: Cichlidae
- Genus: Haplochromis
- Species: H. nyanzae

Binomial name
- Haplochromis nyanzae Greenwood, 1962

Synonyms
- Harpagochromis nyanzae (Greenwood, 1962)

Species of fish

Haplochromis nyanzae is a species of cichlid endemic to Lake Victoria. This species can reach a length of 17.1 centimetres (6.7 in) SL.
