= Haplochromis turkanae =

Conservation status
- Least Concern (IUCN 3.1)

Scientific classification
- Kingdom: Animalia
- Phylum: Chordata
- Class: Actinopterygii
- Order: Cichliformes
- Family: Cichlidae
- Genus: Haplochromis
- Species: H. turkanae

Binomial name
- Haplochromis turkanae Greenwood, 1974

Synonyms
- Thoracochromis turkanae (Greenwood, 1974)

Species of fish

Haplochromis turkanae, the Turkana haplochromis, also known in brief as Turkana haplo, is a species of cichlid endemic to Lake Turkana. This species reaches a length of 8.6 centimetres (3.4 in) SL.
