= Haplochromis gilberti =

Conservation status
- Data Deficient (IUCN 3.1)

Scientific classification
- Kingdom: Animalia
- Phylum: Chordata
- Class: Actinopterygii
- Order: Cichliformes
- Family: Cichlidae
- Genus: Haplochromis
- Species: H. gilberti

Binomial name
- Haplochromis gilberti Greenwood & Gee, 1969

Synonyms
- Prognathochromis gilberti (Greenwood & Gee, 1969)

Species of fish

Haplochromis gilberti is a species of cichlid endemic to Lake Victoria. This species can reach a length of 15 centimetres (5.9 in) SL. The specific name honours Michael Gilbert who was the Experimental Fisheries Officer at the East African Freshwater Fisheries Research Organisation.
