= Haplochromis artaxerxes =

Conservation status
- Data Deficient (IUCN 3.1)

Scientific classification
- Kingdom: Animalia
- Phylum: Chordata
- Class: Actinopterygii
- Order: Cichliformes
- Family: Cichlidae
- Genus: Haplochromis
- Species: H. artaxerxes

Binomial name
- Haplochromis artaxerxes Greenwood, 1962

Synonyms
- Harpagochromis artaxerxes (Greenwood, 1962)

Species of fish

Haplochromis artaxerxes was a species of cichlid endemic to Lake Victoria where it is only known from the Napoleon Gulf, in Uganda. This species can reach a length of 14.7 centimetres (5.8 in) SL. The specific name uses the name of Artaxerxes I of Persia who was known as "long-handed", a reference to this species extremely long pectoral fins.
