= Haplochromis arcanus =

Conservation status
- Data Deficient (IUCN 3.1)

Scientific classification
- Kingdom: Animalia
- Phylum: Chordata
- Class: Actinopterygii
- Order: Cichliformes
- Family: Cichlidae
- Genus: Haplochromis
- Species: H. arcanus

Binomial name
- Haplochromis arcanus Greenwood & Gee, 1969

Synonyms
- Prognathochromis arcanus (Greenwood, 1967)

Species of fish

Haplochromis arcanus is a species of cichlid of unclear conservation status endemic to Lake Victoria. This species can reach a length of 14.2 centimetres (5.6 in) SL.
