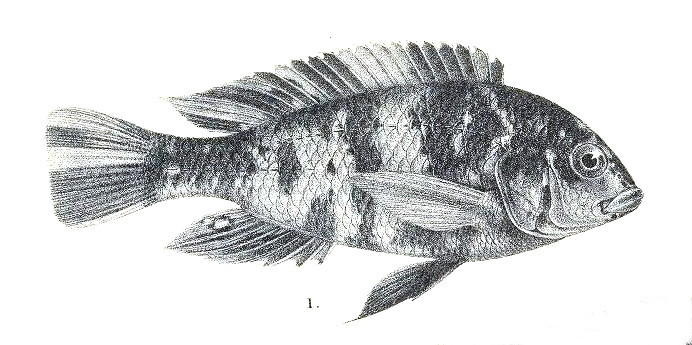

Conservation status
- Vulnerable (IUCN 3.1)

Scientific classification
- Kingdom: Animalia
- Phylum: Chordata
- Class: Actinopterygii
- Order: Cichliformes
- Family: Cichlidae
- Genus: Haplochromis
- Species: H. bicolor

Binomial name
- Haplochromis bicolor Boulenger, 1906

Synonyms
- Macropleurodus bicolor (Boulenger, 1906)

= Haplochromis bicolor =

Species of fish

Haplochromis bicolor is a species of cichlid endemic to Lake Victoria where it prefers areas with hard substrates. This species can reach a length of 15 centimetres (5.9 in) SL. This species has been placed in the genus Macropleurodus and may belong in that genus pending comprehensive revision of the genus Haplochromis.
