= Haplochromis chromogynos =

Conservation status
- Vulnerable (IUCN 3.1)

Scientific classification
- Kingdom: Animalia
- Phylum: Chordata
- Class: Actinopterygii
- Order: Cichliformes
- Family: Cichlidae
- Genus: Haplochromis
- Species: H. chromogynos

Binomial name
- Haplochromis chromogynos Greenwood, 1959

Synonyms
- Paralabidochromis chromogynos (Greenwood, 1959)

Species of fish

Haplochromis chromogynos is a species of cichlid endemic to Lake Victoria. This species grows to a length of 11 centimetres (4.3 in) SL.
