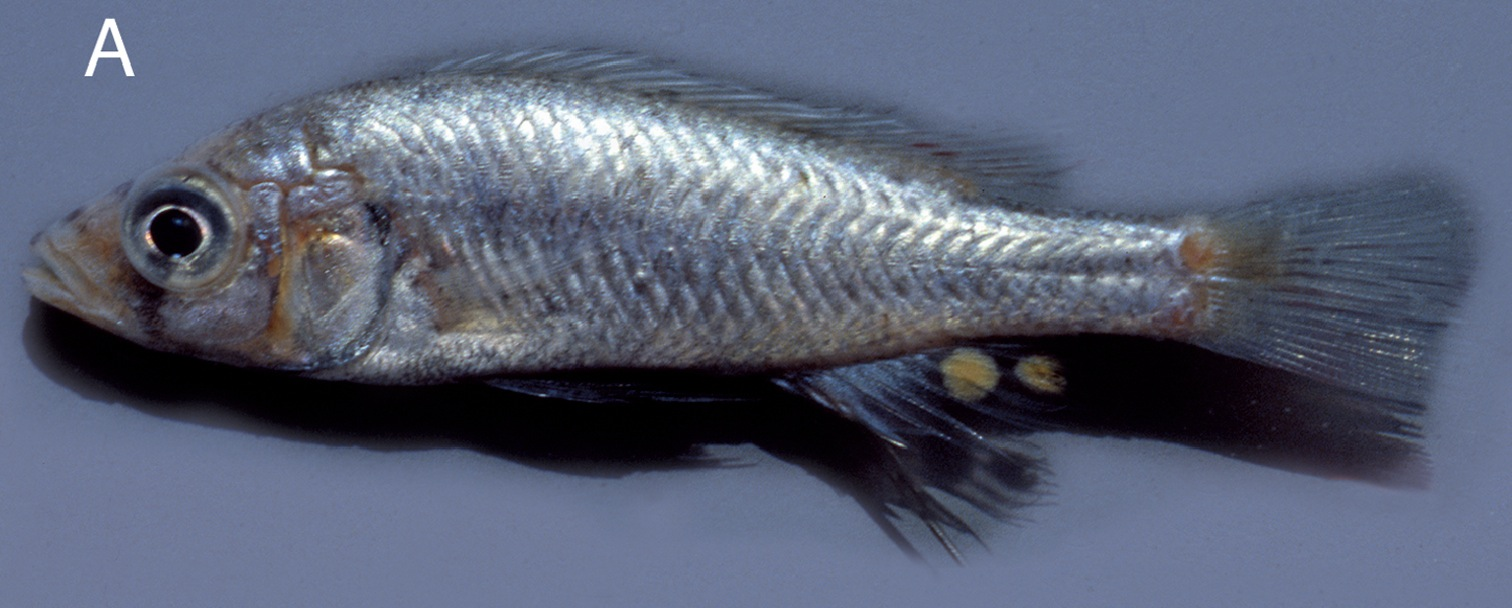

Conservation status
- Data Deficient (IUCN 3.1)

Scientific classification
- Kingdom: Animalia
- Phylum: Chordata
- Class: Actinopterygii
- Order: Cichliformes
- Family: Cichlidae
- Genus: Haplochromis
- Species: H. goldschmidti

Binomial name
- Haplochromis goldschmidti Witte, Westbroek & de Zeeuw, 2013

= Haplochromis goldschmidti =

Species of fish

Haplochromis goldschmidti is a species of cichlid endemic to Lake Victoria, where it is only known to occur with certainty in the southern part of the Emin Pasha Gulf. It feeds mainly on zooplankton and some insects. This species can reach a length of 6.9 centimetres (2.7 in) SL. The specific name honours the Dutch evolutionary biologist Paul-Tijs (Tijs) Goldschmidt (born 30 January 1953 in Amsterdam) who he studied cichlids in Lake Victoria as a researcher from Leiden University.
