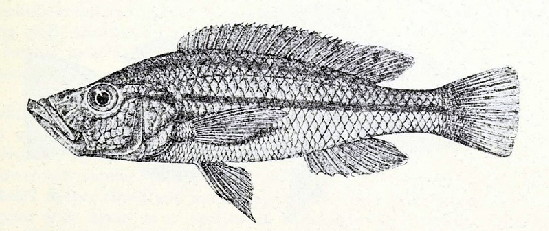

Conservation status
- Critically endangered, possibly extinct (IUCN 3.1)

Scientific classification
- Kingdom: Animalia
- Phylum: Chordata
- Class: Actinopterygii
- Order: Cichliformes
- Family: Cichlidae
- Genus: Haplochromis
- Species: H. xenostoma

Binomial name
- Haplochromis xenostoma Regan, 1922

Synonyms
- Prognathochromis xenostoma (Regan, 1922)

= Haplochromis xenostoma =

Species of fish

Haplochromis xenostoma is a species of cichlid endemic to Lake Victoria, though it may be extinct. This species reaches a length of 20.3 centimetres (8.0 in) SL.
