= Haplochromis megalops =

Conservation status
- Vulnerable (IUCN 3.1)

Scientific classification
- Kingdom: Animalia
- Phylum: Chordata
- Class: Actinopterygii
- Order: Cichliformes
- Family: Cichlidae
- Genus: Haplochromis
- Species: H. megalops

Binomial name
- Haplochromis megalops Greenwood & Gee, 1969

Synonyms
- Astatotilapia megalops (Greenwood & Gee, 1969)

Species of fish

Haplochromis megalops is a species of cichlid endemic to Lake Victoria. This species can reach a length of 8.1 centimetres (3.2 in) SL.
