= Haplochromis luteus =

Conservation status
- Vulnerable (IUCN 3.1)

Scientific classification
- Kingdom: Animalia
- Phylum: Chordata
- Class: Actinopterygii
- Order: Cichliformes
- Family: Cichlidae
- Genus: Haplochromis
- Species: H. luteus

Binomial name
- Haplochromis luteus (Seehausen & Bouton, 1998)

Synonyms
- Mbipia lutea Seehausen & Bouton, 1998

Species of fish

Haplochromis luteus is a species of cichlid endemic to Lake Victoria where it is known from the western park of Speke Gulf and also from the Sengerema region, all in Tanzania. This shallow water species, 0 to 2 metres (0.0 to 6.6 ft), is found along gently sloping rocky shores. This species can reach a length of 13.3 centimetres (5.2 in) SL. This species was originally described in the genus Mbipia, however not all scientists have accepted such placement. It may be placed back in Mbipia should a comprehensive review of the genus Haplochromis be conducted.
