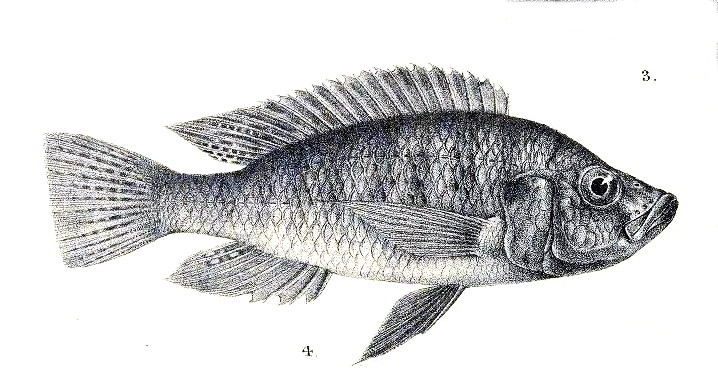

Conservation status
- Critically endangered, possibly extinct (IUCN 3.1)

Scientific classification
- Kingdom: Animalia
- Phylum: Chordata
- Class: Actinopterygii
- Order: Cichliformes
- Family: Cichlidae
- Genus: Haplochromis
- Species: H. microdon

Binomial name
- Haplochromis microdon (Boulenger, 1906)

Synonyms
- Pelmatochromis microdon Boulenger, 1906; Lipochromis microdon (Boulenger, 1906)

= Haplochromis microdon =

Species of fish

Haplochromis microdon is a species of cichlid endemic to Lake Victoria. It is critically endangered, though it may now be extinct. This species can reach a length of 14.8 centimetres (5.8 in) SL.
