= Haplochromis flavus =

Conservation status
- Least Concern (IUCN 3.1)

Scientific classification
- Kingdom: Animalia
- Phylum: Chordata
- Class: Actinopterygii
- Order: Cichliformes
- Family: Cichlidae
- Genus: Haplochromis
- Species: H. flavus

Binomial name
- Haplochromis flavus Seehausen, Zwennes & Lippitsch, 1998

Species of fish

Haplochromis flavus, the yellow rockpicker, is a species of cichlid endemic to the Tanzanian portion of Lake Victoria. This species can reach a length of 11.9 centimetres (4.7 in) SL.
