= Dirk Thys van den Audenaerde =

Belgian ichthyologist

Dirk Frans Elisabeth Thys van den Audenaerde (born 14 March 1934 in Mechelen) is a Belgian ichthyologist. He is an honorary director of the Royal Museum for Central Africa and professor emeritus at the KU Leuven.
