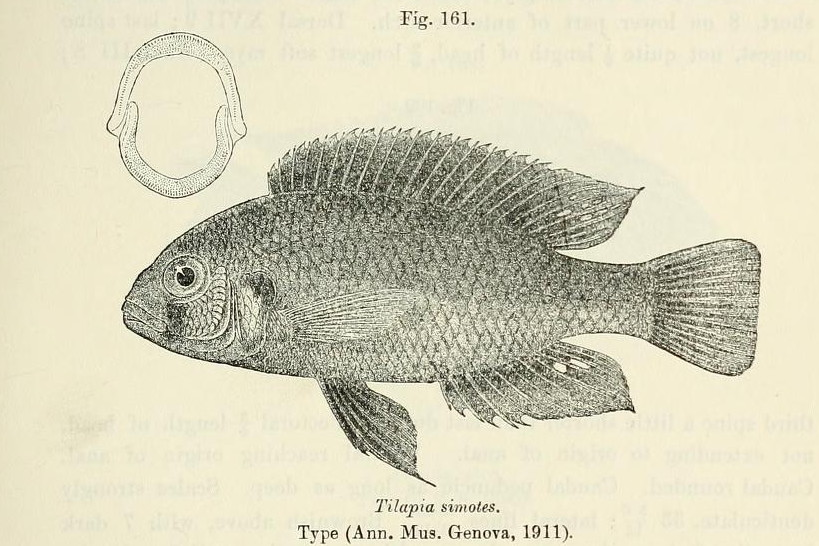
- Neochromis simotes

Scientific classification
- Kingdom: Animalia
- Phylum: Chordata
- Class: Actinopterygii
- Order: Cichliformes
- Family: Cichlidae
- Tribe: Haplochromini
- Genus: Neochromis; Regan, 1920

Type species
- Tilapia simotes Boulenger, 1911

= Neochromis =

Genus of fishes

Neochromis is a genus of haplochromine cichlids endemic to Lake Victoria. This genus is currently considered a synonym of Haplochromis pending a comprehensive review of the haplochromine cichlids, though if recognized as a valid genus it would contain the following species

- Neochromis gigas Seehausen & Lippitsch, 1998
- Neochromis greenwoodi Seehausen & Bouton, 1998
- Neochromis nigricans (Boulenger, 1906)
- Neochromis omnicaeruleus Seehausen & Bouton, 1998
- Neochromis rufocaudalis Seehausen & Bouton, 1998
- Neochromis simotes (Boulenger, 1911)
