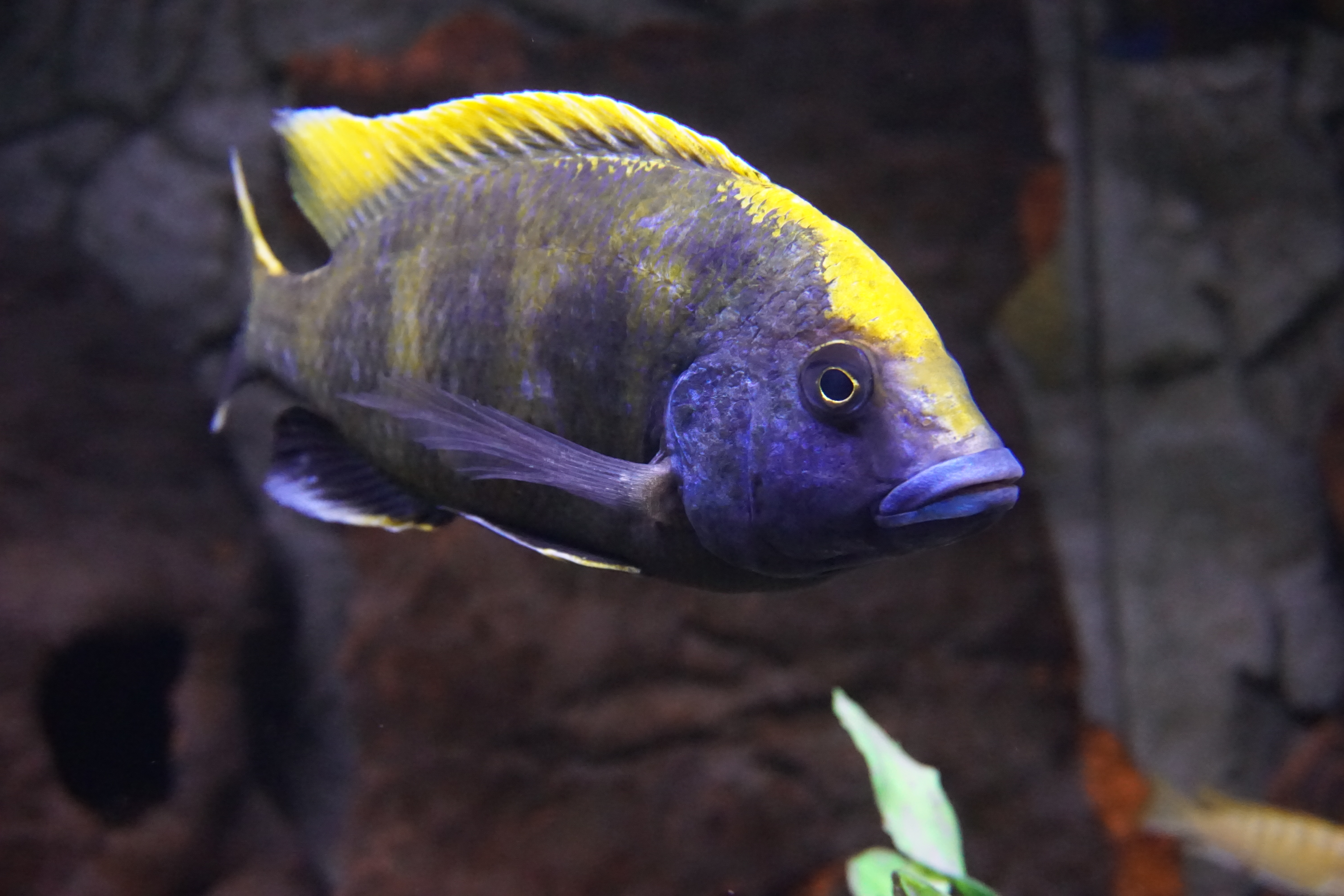
- At Natural History Museum University of Pisa

Conservation status
- Least Concern (IUCN 3.1)

Scientific classification
- Kingdom: Animalia
- Phylum: Chordata
- Class: Actinopterygii
- Order: Cichliformes
- Family: Cichlidae
- Genus: Nimbochromis
- Species: N. venustus

Binomial name
- Nimbochromis venustus (Boulenger, 1908)

Synonyms
- Haplochromis venustus Boulenger, 1908; Cyrtocara venusta (Boulenger, 1908); Haplochromis simulans Regan, 1922

= Nimbochromis venustus =

Species of fish

Nimbochromis venustus, commonly called venustus hap or giraffe hap, is a Haplochromine cichlid endemic to Lake Malawi in Africa. It prefers the deeper regions of the lake (6 to 23 metres (20 to 75 ft)) where it hunts smaller juvenile cichlids with a specialised hunting technique. After spotting prey, it will partially submerge itself into the sand and lie motionless until the chosen fish comes within reach. It will then dart out of the sand and strike. It is related to Nimbochromis livingstonii. In the wild it is known to grow to 25 centimetres (9.8 in) TL though usually not exceeding a length of 22.5 centimetres (8.9 in) TL.

It is a popular freshwater aquarium fish. The fish are generally yellow with a pattern of darker, melanic blotches. Males will have a blue head and other blue colouring when they reach sexual maturity.

== See also ==
- List of freshwater aquarium fish species
