= Microchromis =

Scientific classification
- Domain: Eukaryota
- Kingdom: Animalia
- Phylum: Chordata
- Class: Actinopterygii
- Order: Cichliformes
- Family: Cichlidae
- Subfamily: Pseudocrenilabrinae
- Tribe: Haplochromini
- Genus: Microchromis; D.S. Johnson, 1975

Type species
- Microchromis zebroides D.S. Johnson, 1975

Genus of fishes

Microchromis is a small genus of haplochromine cichlids which are endemic to Lake Malawi.

== Species ==
There are two species in the genus Microchromis:

- Microchromis aurifrons Tawil, 2011
- Microchromis zebroides D.S. Johnson, 1975

== Synonymy ==
Although FishBase recognises the genus Microchromis other authorities treat it as a junior synonym of Cynotilapia.
