= Haplochromis greenwoodi =

Conservation status
- Least Concern (IUCN 3.1)

Scientific classification
- Kingdom: Animalia
- Phylum: Chordata
- Class: Actinopterygii
- Order: Cichliformes
- Family: Cichlidae
- Genus: Haplochromis
- Species: H. greenwoodi

Binomial name
- Haplochromis greenwoodi (Seehausen & Bouton, 1998)

Synonyms
- Neochromis greenwoodi Seehausen & Bouton, 1998

Species of fish

Haplochromis greenwoodi is a species of cichlid endemic to Lake Victoria where they are found in the southeastern portion of the lake. Its preferred habitat consists of areas with rocky substrates. This species can reach a length of 13.5 centimetres (5.3 in) SL. The specific name honours the British ichthyologist Humphry Greenwood (1927-1995) for his contribution to the knowledge of the systematics of the Lake Victoria cichlids. This species is placed in the genus Neochromis by some authorities.
