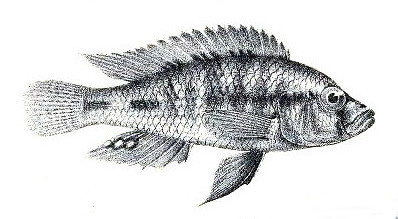
- Thoracochromis wingatii

Scientific classification
- Kingdom: Animalia
- Phylum: Chordata
- Class: Actinopterygii
- Order: Cichliformes
- Family: Cichlidae
- Tribe: Haplochromini
- Genus: Thoracochromis; Greenwood, 1979

Type species
- Paratilapia wingatii Boulenger, 1902

= Thoracochromis =

Genus of fishes

Thoracochromis is a fish genus of haplochromine cichlids that are endemic to Africa. Most species are from rivers in Angola and Namibia, or the Congo River Basin in Central Africa, but T. wingatii is from the Nile system. Additionally, there are a few apparently undescribed species from the Nile system (two in its delta and one from lakes near Fayum), which appear to be close relatives of T. wingatii or Haplochromis loati. Many species have been moved between this genus and Haplochromis, and while some consensus has been reached in recent years, their mutual delimitation is still far from settled.

== Species ==
There are currently four recognized species in this genus:

- Thoracochromis albolabris (Trewavas & Thys van den Audenaerde, 1969) (Thicklipped Happy)
- Thoracochromis buysi (M. L. Penrith, 1970) (Namib Happy)
- Thoracochromis lucullae (Boulenger, 1913)
- Thoracochromis wingatii (Boulenger, 1902)

== Distribution ==
T. buysi is endemic to the Kunene River.
