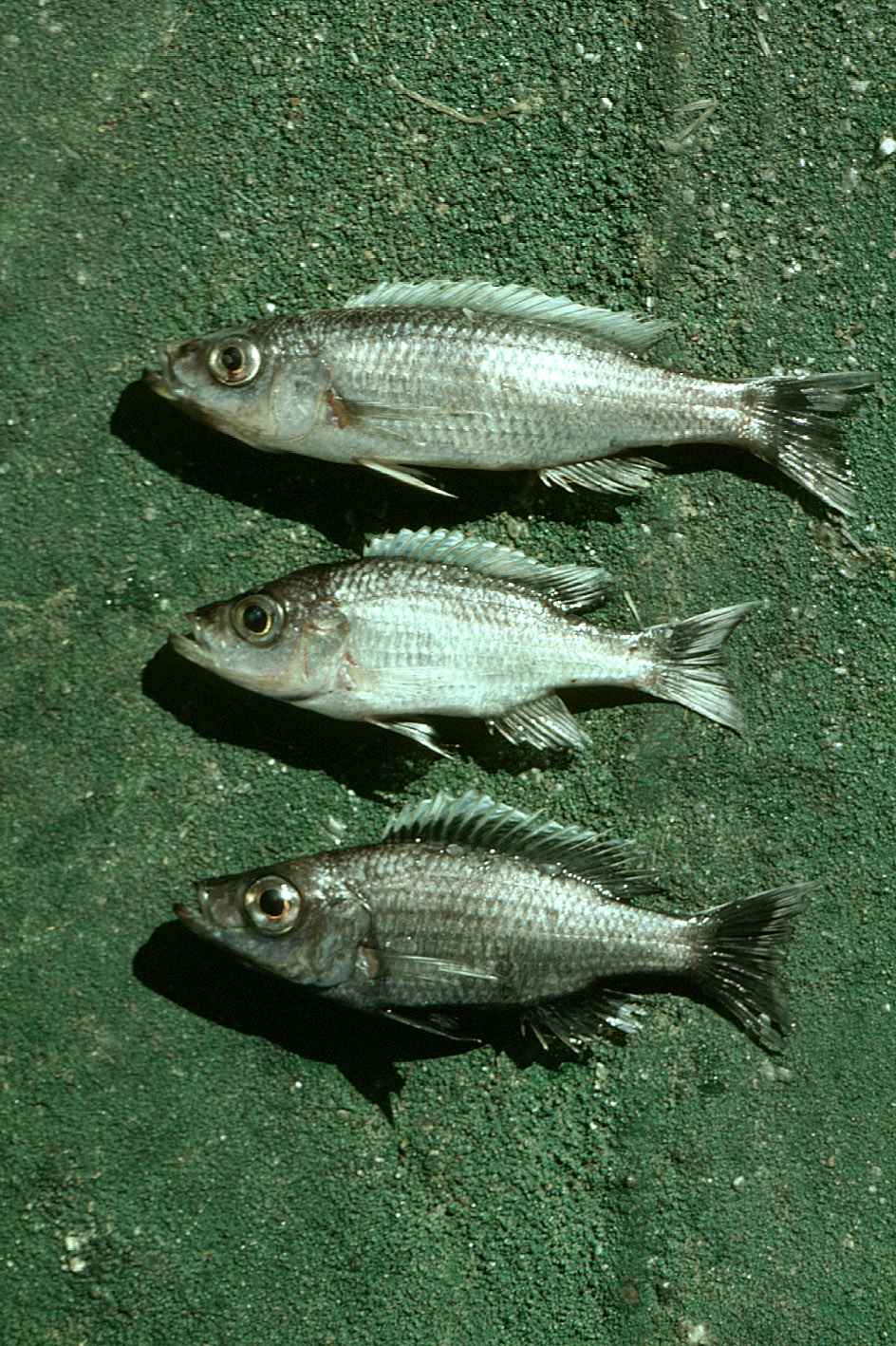
- Diplotaxodon macrops (at bottom)

Conservation status
- Least Concern (IUCN 3.1)

Scientific classification
- Kingdom: Animalia
- Phylum: Chordata
- Class: Actinopterygii
- Order: Cichliformes
- Family: Cichlidae
- Genus: Diplotaxodon
- Species: D. macrops

Binomial name
- Diplotaxodon macrops G. F. Turner & Stauffer, 1998

= Diplotaxodon macrops =

Species of fish

Diplotaxodon macrops is a species of haplochromine cichlid which is endemic to Lake Malawi. It is found throughout the lake in Malawi, Mozambique, and Tanzania. Within Lake Malawi it is abundant near the lake bed over rock shelves. It appears to be a plankton-eating species that feeds on insect larvae, crustaceans, and diatoms.
