= Diplotaxodon argenteus =

Conservation status
- Least Concern (IUCN 3.1)

Scientific classification
- Kingdom: Animalia
- Phylum: Chordata
- Class: Actinopterygii
- Order: Cichliformes
- Family: Cichlidae
- Genus: Diplotaxodon
- Species: D. argenteus

Binomial name
- Diplotaxodon argenteus Trewavas, 1935

Species of fish

Diplotaxodon argenteus is a species of haplochromine cichlid fish in the family Cichlidae. It is endemic to Lake Malawi. It occurs throughout the lake and therefore is found in Malawi, Mozambique, and Tanzania.
