= M. robustus =

M. robustus may refer to:

- Macropus robustus, the Eastern wallaroo, common wallaroo, hill wallaroo or euro, a large mammal species found throughout much of the Australian mainland
- Melanochromis robustus, a fish species found in Malawi and Tanzania
- Melichneutes robustus, the lyre-tailed honeyguide, a bird species found in Africa

== Synonyms ==
- Moroteuthis robustus, a synonym for Moroteuthis robusta, the robust clubhook squid, a squid species found primarily in the boreal to temperate North Pacific
