= Diplotaxodon ecclesi =

Conservation status
- Least Concern (IUCN 3.1)

Scientific classification
- Kingdom: Animalia
- Phylum: Chordata
- Class: Actinopterygii
- Order: Cichliformes
- Family: Cichlidae
- Genus: Diplotaxodon
- Species: D. ecclesi

Binomial name
- Diplotaxodon ecclesi W. E. Burgess & H. R. Axelrod, 1973

Synonyms
- Diplotaxodon apogon Turner & Stauffer, 1998

Species of fish

Diplotaxodon ecclesi is a species of haplochromine cichlid. It is endemic to Lake Malawi, in East Africa, where it is found in open water at mainly at the deeper levels, although it is rarely caught by trawling. Its main prey is the Lake Malawi sardine (Engraulicypris sardella).

== Etymology ==
The specific name honours the Senior Fisheries Research Officer of Malawi, David Henry Eccles (b. 1932).
