= Diplotaxodon greenwoodi =

Conservation status
- Least Concern (IUCN 3.1)

Scientific classification
- Kingdom: Animalia
- Phylum: Chordata
- Class: Actinopterygii
- Order: Cichliformes
- Family: Cichlidae
- Genus: Diplotaxodon
- Species: D. greenwoodi

Binomial name
- Diplotaxodon greenwoodi Stauffer & McKaye, 1986

Species of fish

Diplotaxodon greenwoodi is a species of haplochromine cichlid which is endemic to Lake Malawi. It occurs in the reef and shelf zones of the lake where it preys on small cichlids. The specific name honours the English ichthyologist Peter Humphry Greenwood (1927–1995).
