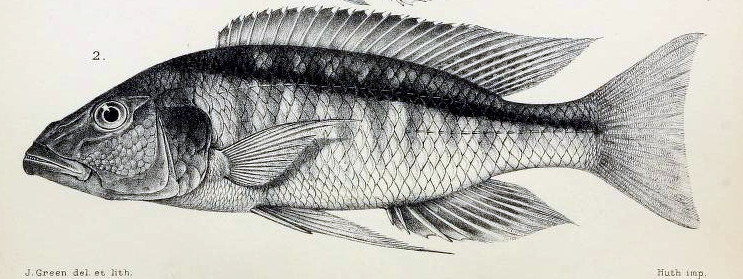

Conservation status
- Endangered (IUCN 3.1)

Scientific classification
- Kingdom: Animalia
- Phylum: Chordata
- Class: Actinopterygii
- Order: Cichliformes
- Family: Cichlidae
- Genus: Champsochromis
- Species: C. spilorhynchus

Binomial name
- Champsochromis spilorhynchus (Regan, 1922)

Synonyms
- Haplochromis spilorhynchus Regan, 1922; Cyrtocara spilorhyncha (Regan, 1922); Cyrtocara spilorhynchus (Regan, 1922); Haplochromis longipes Regan, 1922

= Champsochromis spilorhynchus =

Species of fish

Champsochromis spilorhynchus is a species of haplochromine cichlid. It is found in Malawi, Mozambique, and Tanzania in Lake Malawi, Lake Malombe and the upper Shire River.

== Photo link ==
- Malawicichlids.com
