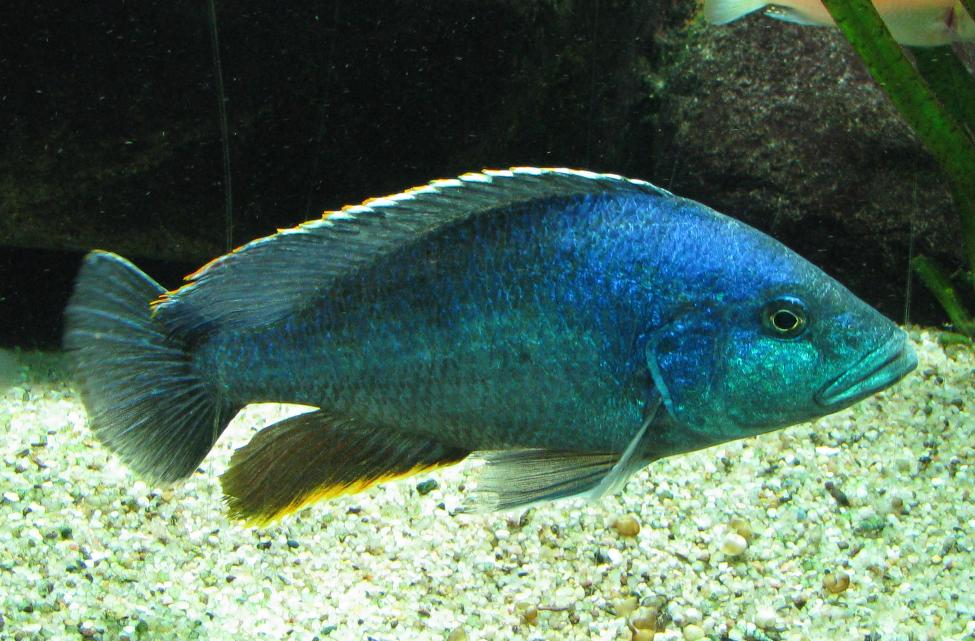

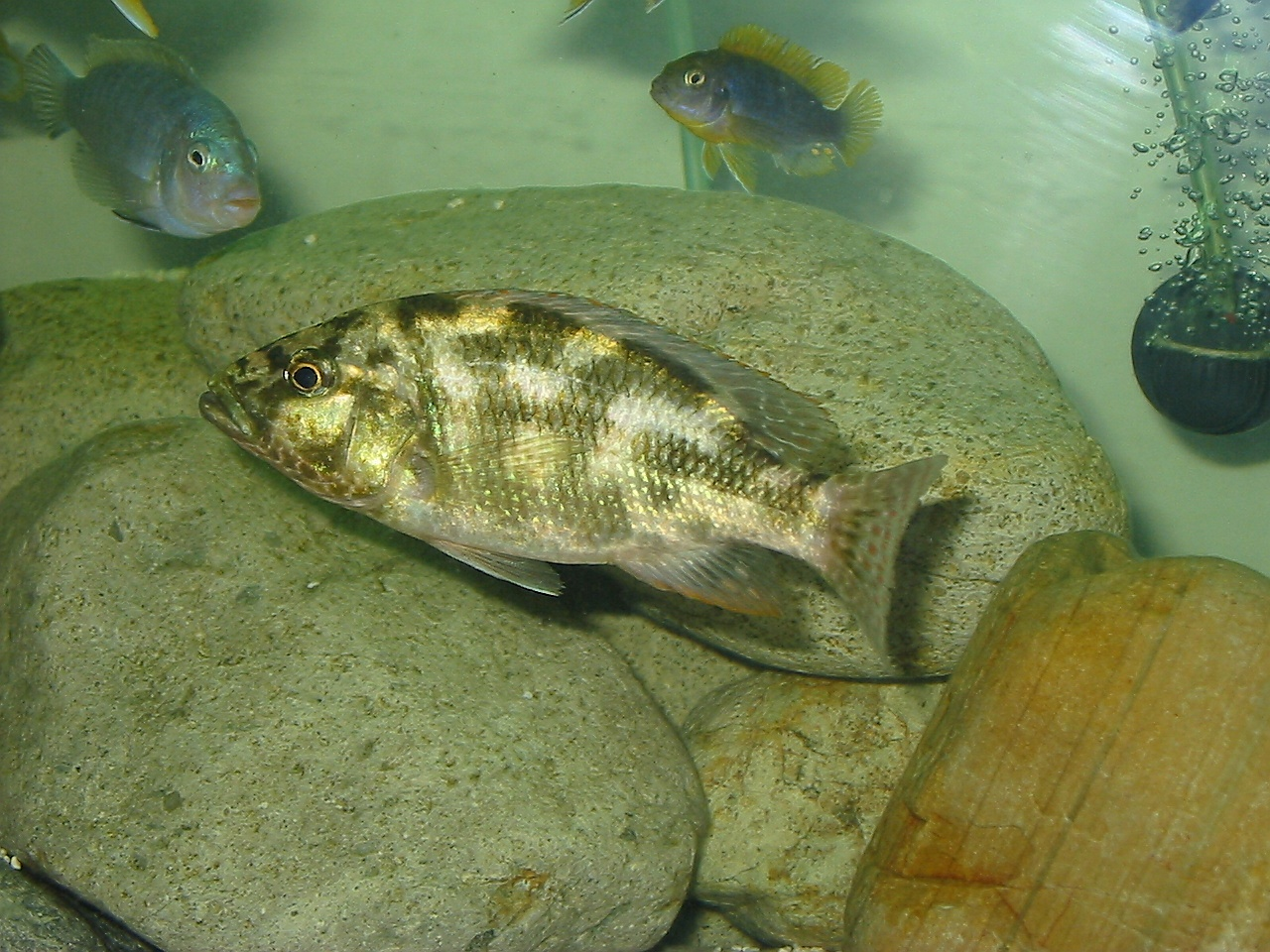
- Adult male in full breeding dress (above) and female/immature (below)

Conservation status
- Least Concern (IUCN 3.1)

Scientific classification
- Kingdom: Animalia
- Phylum: Chordata
- Class: Actinopterygii
- Order: Cichliformes
- Family: Cichlidae
- Genus: Nimbochromis
- Species: N. polystigma

Binomial name
- Nimbochromis polystigma (Regan, 1922)

Synonyms
- Haplochromis polystigma Regan, 1922; Cyrtocara polystigma (Regan, 1922); Haplochromis maculimanus Regan, 1922; Cyrtocara maculimanus (Regan, 1922); Nimbochromis maculimanus (Regan, 1922); Haplochromis pardalis Trewavas, 1935; Cyrtocara pardalis (Trewavas, 1935); Nimbochromis pardalis (Trewavas, 1935)

= Nimbochromis polystigma =

Species of fish

Nimbochromis polystigma is a species of cichlid endemic to Lake Malawi, in the Great Rift Valley system of Africa. This species prefers areas with rock/sand substrate or areas with plentiful vegetation. It can grow to a length of 23 centimetres (9.1 in) TL.

== General ==
Occurring throughout the lake, Nimbochromis polystigma is a piscivorous fish, often preying upon juvenile cichlids. The local name for the fish is Kaligono, meaning 'sleeper' in the chiCheŵa language. It shares this name with other Nimbochromis species due to their hunting technique, which involves lying motionless on the bottom, sometimes on its side as if feigning death, until small fish approach to investigate, then pouncing on the prey. When hunting this way their colour will fade, apparently as the whiter colour attracts more small cichlids. They will also sometimes launch ambush attacks on small fish from the cover of vegetation, with their colouration acting as disruptive camouflage.

Like most Lake Malawi cichlids, Nimbochromis polystigma is a mouthbrooder, with the female carrying her young in her mouth for two to three weeks before being released.

== In the aquarium ==
Nimbochromis polystigma is a relatively peaceful species, as long as its cohabitants are not small enough to be considered prey. It's an enthusiastic feeder, and will eat all of the usual foods given to cichlids, and has the rather endearing habit of leaping from the water to try to get at food or fingers.

In aquaria it can grow to 30 cm (12 in), and requires a large aquarium—at least 300 litres (80 US gal)—and can be kept with other haplochromines and most mbuna. It is best to have some rocks for them to hide in when threatened, but they also need room to swim.
