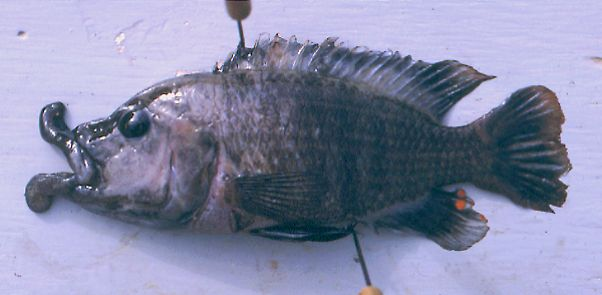

Conservation status
- Least Concern (IUCN 3.1)

Scientific classification
- Kingdom: Animalia
- Phylum: Chordata
- Class: Actinopterygii
- Division: Teleostei
- Order: Cichliformes
- Family: Cichlidae
- Tribe: Haplochromini
- Genus: Abactochromis; M. K. Oliver & Arnegard, 2010
- Species: A. labrosus

Binomial name
- Abactochromis labrosus (Trewavas, 1935)

Synonyms
- Melanochromis labrosus

= Abactochromis =

Genus of fishes

Abactochromis is a monotypic genus of cichlid fish containing the single species Abactochromis labrosus (formerly known as Melanochromis labrosus). The genus name combines the Latin for "driven away from" ("ab" - away from, "actus" - driven) with the commonly used haplochromine name "chromis". The name encompasses both the origin of the genus (the species was "banished" from the genus Melanochromis) and the fish's solitary, wandering behaviour (as if it had been driven away from the other cichlids).

A. labrosus is native to Lake Malawi. The largest known wild specimen (shown in the photo at right) had a standard length (without caudal fin) of 119 mm (4.7 in).
