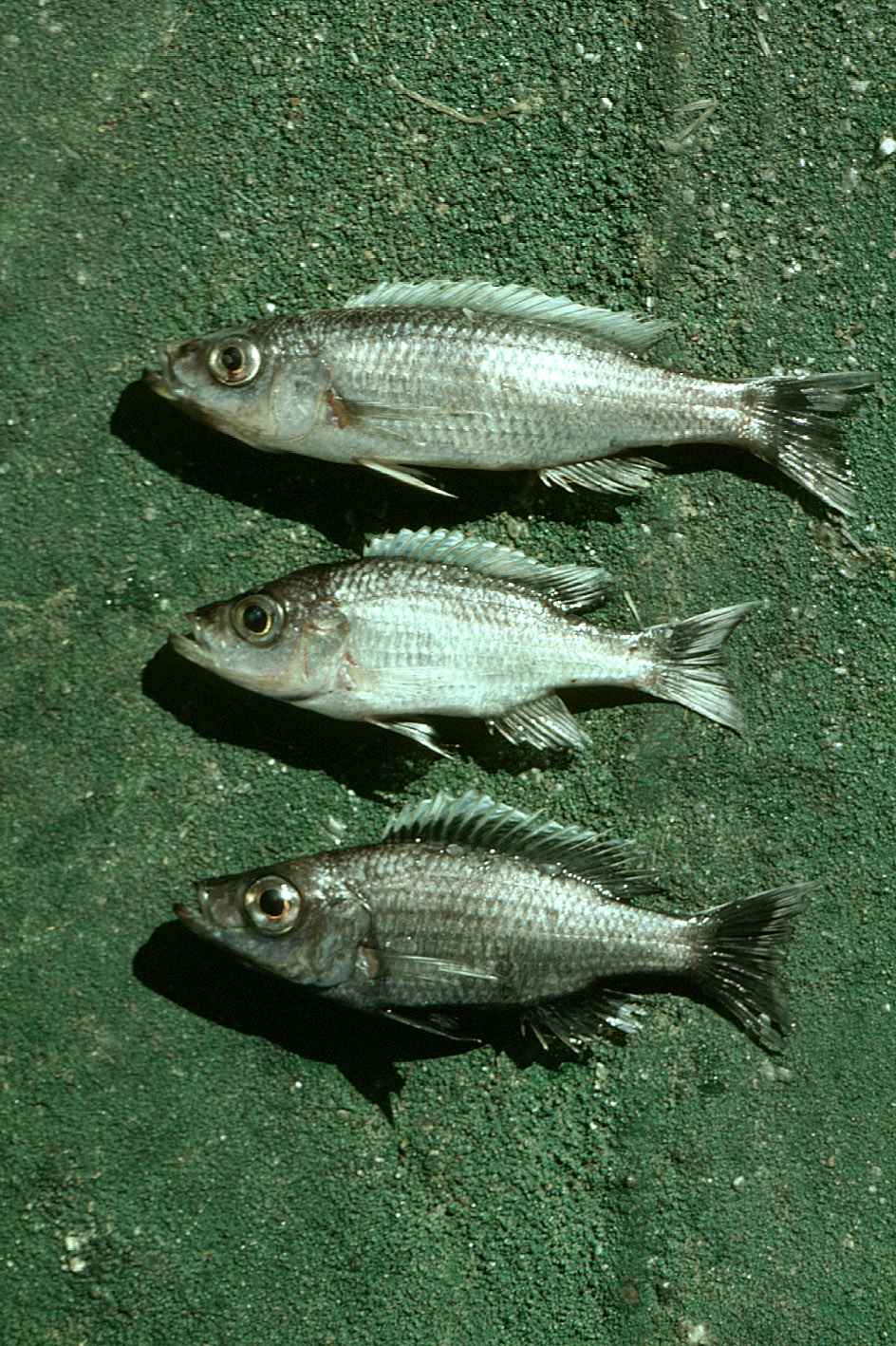
- top

Conservation status
- Least Concern (IUCN 3.1)

Scientific classification
- Kingdom: Animalia
- Phylum: Chordata
- Class: Actinopterygii
- Order: Cichliformes
- Family: Cichlidae
- Genus: Diplotaxodon
- Species: D. limnothrissa

Binomial name
- Diplotaxodon limnothrissa G. F. Turner, 1994

= Diplotaxodon limnothrissa =

Species of fish

Diplotaxodon limnothrissa is a species of haplochromine cichlid which is endemic to Lake Malawi and it is found in Malawi, Mozambique, and Tanzania. It occurs in inshore and offshore waters, on reefs and over the rock shelf; and it is abundant over the anoxic zone. It is a maternal mouthbrooder and it feeds on zooplankton. It is probably the most abundant species of cichlid in Lake Malawi. The specific name references the clupeid Limnothrissa miodon, the Lake Tanganyika sardine, to which this species bears some morphological and biological similarities.
