= Palaeopercichthys =

Palaeopercichthys Temporal range: Thanetian

Scientific classification
- Kingdom: Animalia
- Phylum: Chordata
- Class: Actinopterygii
- Order: Perciformes
- Genus: †Palaeopercichthys; Greenwood, 1983

Extinct genus of fishes

Palaeopercichthys is an extinct genus of prehistoric bony fish that lived during the Thanetian stage of the Paleocene epoch.
