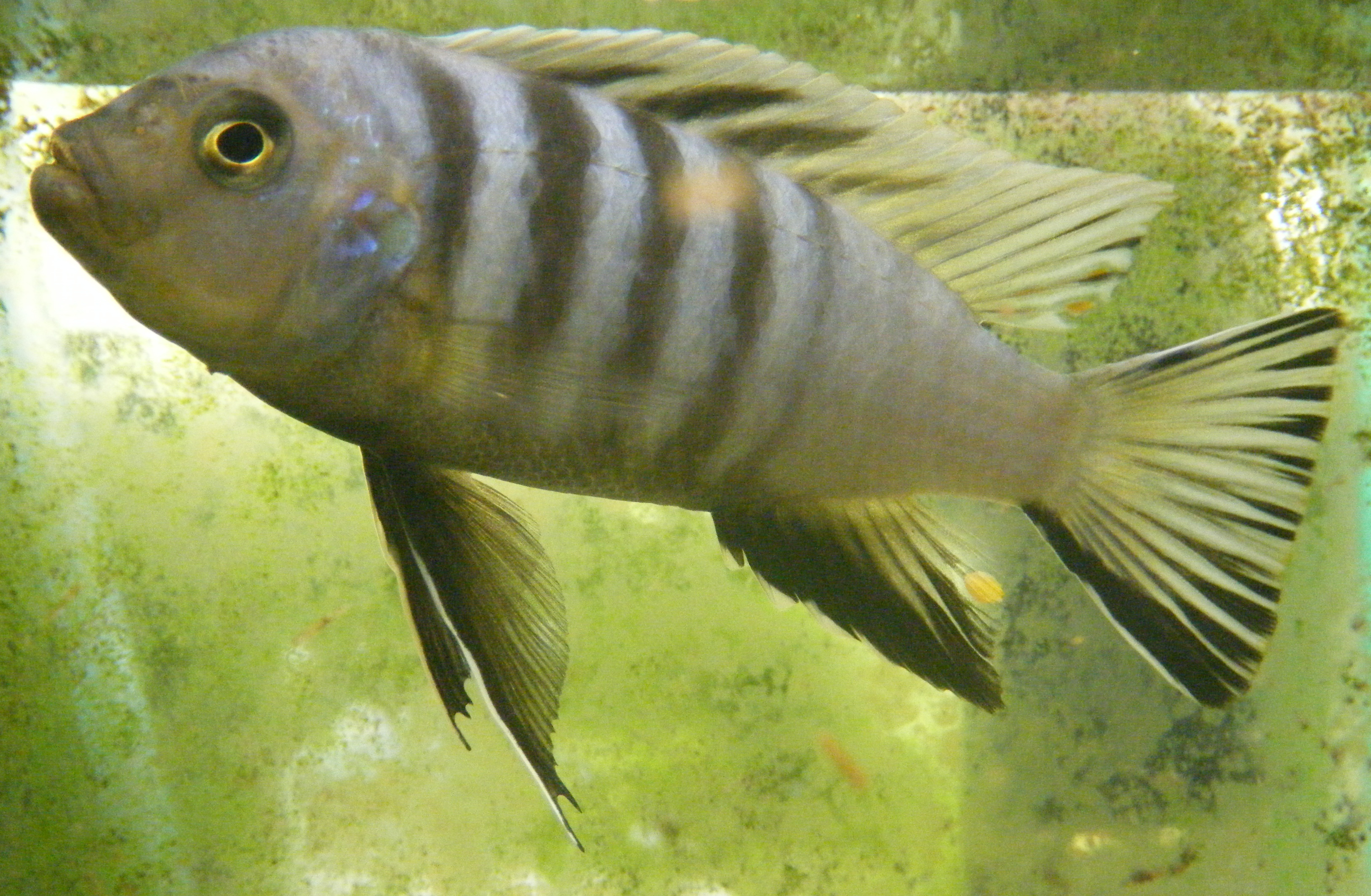

Conservation status
- Least Concern (IUCN 3.1)

Scientific classification
- Kingdom: Animalia
- Phylum: Chordata
- Class: Actinopterygii
- Order: Cichliformes
- Family: Cichlidae
- Genus: Cynotilapia
- Species: C. axelrodi

Binomial name
- Cynotilapia axelrodi W. E. Burgess, 1976

= Cynotilapia axelrodi =

Species of fish

Cynotilapia axelrodi is a species haplochromine cichlid which is endemic to Lake Malawi where it occurs in Nkhata Bay and Chirombo Point, Malawi.

== Etymology ==
The specific name honours the publisher Herbert R. Axelrod (1927-2017).
