= Lumphead cichlid =

Lumphead cichlid may refer to:

- Cyrtocara moorii, a fish
- Steatocranus casuarius, a fish
