= Pyxichromis =

Scientific classification
- Kingdom: Animalia
- Phylum: Chordata
- Class: Actinopterygii
- Order: Cichliformes
- Family: Cichlidae
- Tribe: Haplochromini
- Genus: Pyxichromis; Greenwood, 1980

Type species
- Haplochromis parorthostoma Greenwood, 1967

Genus of fishes

Pyxichromis is a genus of haplochromine cichlids. The species in this genus are currently included in Haplochromis by FishBase. Each species is endemic to a different Rift Valley lake in East Africa.

== Species ==
It contains the following species:

- Pyxichromis orthostoma (Regan, 1922)
- Pyxichromis paradoxus (Lippitsch & Kaufman, 2003)
- Pyxichromis parorthostoma (Greenwood, 1967)
