= H. nigricans =

H. nigricans may refer to:

- Haplochromis nigricans, Boulenger, 1906, a fish species in the genus Haplochromis
- Heliotropium nigricans, a plant species endemic to Yemen
- Hexatoma nigricans, Edwards, 1927, a crane fly species in the genus Hexatoma
- Hirundo nigricans, the tree martin, a bird species found in Australia
- Hypoplectrus nigricans, a hamlet fish from the Western Atlantic
- Hypentelium nigricans, the northern hogsucker, a sucker fish species found in the rivers of the Mississippi basin from Oklahoma and Alabama northward to Minnesota

== Synonyms ==
- Hypostomus nigricans, a synonym for Parancistrus aurantiacus, a catfish species

== See also ==
- Nigricans (disambiguation)
