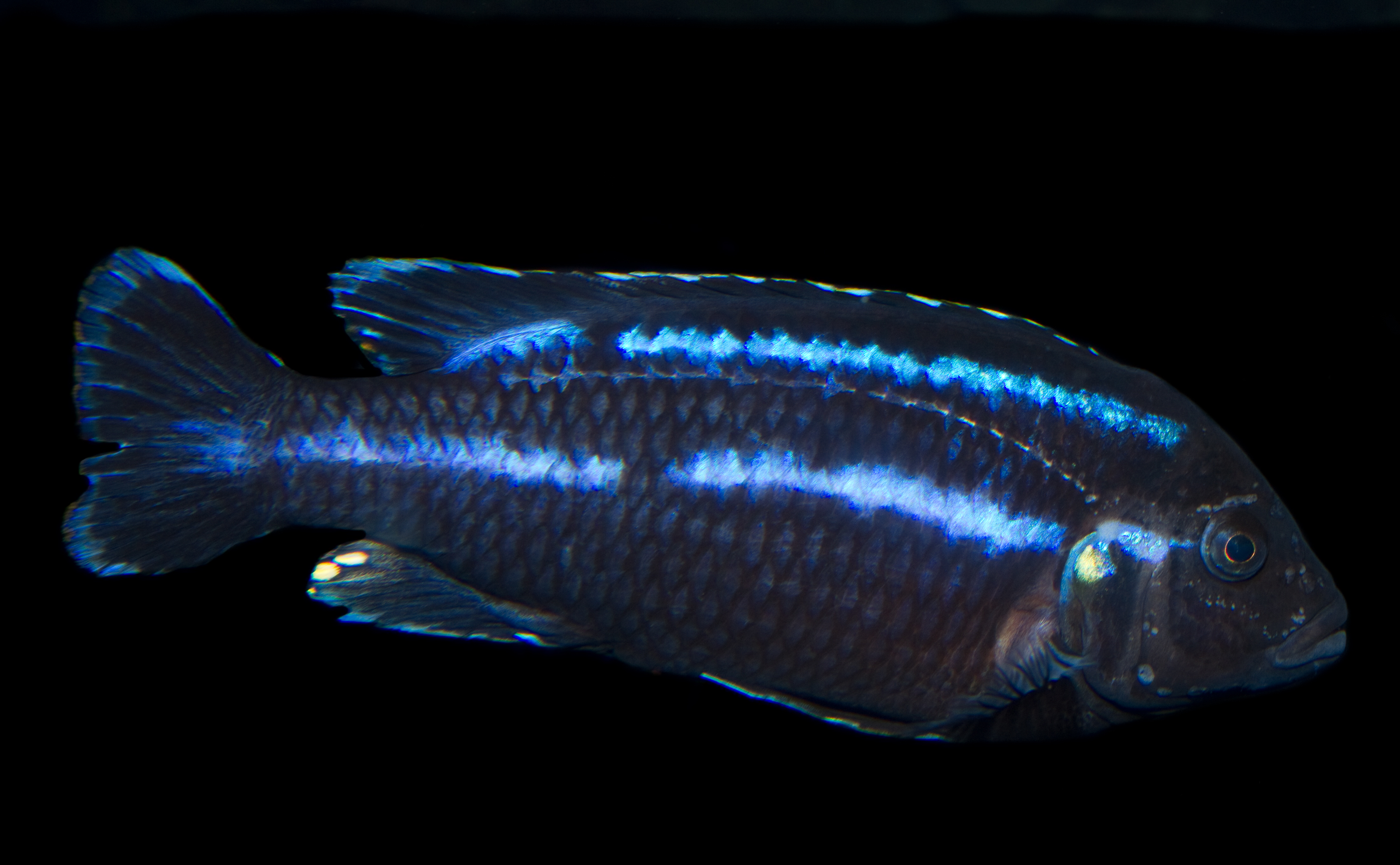
- Melanochromis parallelus, now synonymised with M. loriae

Conservation status
- Least Concern (IUCN 3.1)

Scientific classification
- Kingdom: Animalia
- Phylum: Chordata
- Class: Actinopterygii
- Order: Cichliformes
- Family: Cichlidae
- Genus: Melanochromis
- Species: M. loriae

Binomial name
- Melanochromis loriae D. S. Johnson, 1975

Synonyms
- Melanochromis parallelus Burgess & Axelrod, 1976

= Melanochromis loriae =

Species of fish

Melanochromis loriae is a species of cichlid in the Cichlidae endemic to Lake Malawi. This species can reach a length of 12.5 centimetres (4.9 in) TL.

Once believed to only occur around Chipoka Island, a revision in 2012 synonymized M. loriae with the parallel striped mbuna, M. parallelus, which has populations around Likoma Island, Chisumulu Island, and the northwestern coast.

Collection of specimens for the aquarium trade is a threat to its wild populations.

The specific name honours the daughter of the fish dealer John Lomardo, Lori.
