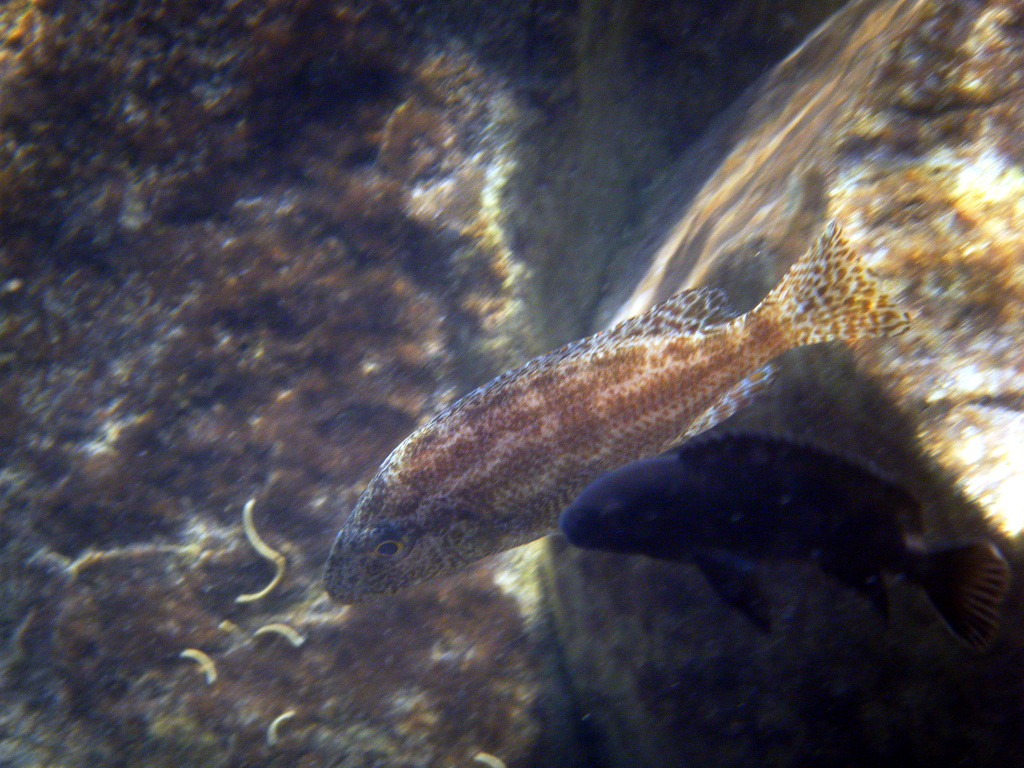

Conservation status
- Least Concern (IUCN 3.1)

Scientific classification
- Kingdom: Animalia
- Phylum: Chordata
- Class: Actinopterygii
- Order: Cichliformes
- Family: Cichlidae
- Genus: Nimbochromis
- Species: N. linni

Binomial name
- Nimbochromis linni (W. E. Burgess & H. R. Axelrod, 1975)

Synonyms
- Haplochromis linni W. E. Burgess & Axelrod, 1975; Cyrtocara linni (W. E. Burgess & Axelrod, 1975)

= Nimbochromis linni =

Species of fish

Nimbochromis linni is a species of cichlid endemic to Lake Malawi. This species can reach a length of 25 centimetres (9.8 in) TL. It can also be found in the aquarium trade. The specific name honours D. Wayne Linn of the Fisheries Office in Malawi, whose help to Herbert R. Axelrod made his field trip to Lake Malawi possible.

== Distribution and habitat ==
N. linni is widespread in Lake Malawi, occurring in rocky and intermediate demersal habitats in the range of 2–61 m (6 ft 7 in – 200 ft 2 in) deep.

== Behaviour ==
N. linni is a piscivore that has been observed ambushing prey. It is a mouthbrooding species that exhibits parental care.
