= Purple mbuna =

Conservation status
- Near Threatened (IUCN 3.1)

Scientific classification
- Kingdom: Animalia
- Phylum: Chordata
- Class: Actinopterygii
- Order: Cichliformes
- Family: Cichlidae
- Genus: Melanochromis
- Species: M. vermivorus

Binomial name
- Melanochromis vermivorus Trewavas, 1935

Species of fish

The purple mbuna (Melanochromis vermivorus) is a species of cichlid endemic to Lake Malawi. This species can reach a length of 7.4 centimetres (2.9 in) SL. It can also be found in the aquarium trade.
