= Melanochromis melanopterus =

Conservation status
- Least Concern (IUCN 3.1)

Scientific classification
- Kingdom: Animalia
- Phylum: Chordata
- Class: Actinopterygii
- Order: Cichliformes
- Family: Cichlidae
- Genus: Melanochromis
- Species: M. melanopterus

Binomial name
- Melanochromis melanopterus Trewavas, 1935

Synonyms
- Melanochromis mellitus Johnson, 1976

Species of fish

Melanochromis melanopterus is a species of cichlid endemic to Lake Malawi where it is found over rocky substrates. This species can reach a length of 11.4 centimetres (4.5 in) SL. It can also be found in the aquarium trade.
