= Fwa River =

River in the Democratic Republic of the Congo

Fwa River French: Rivière Fwa
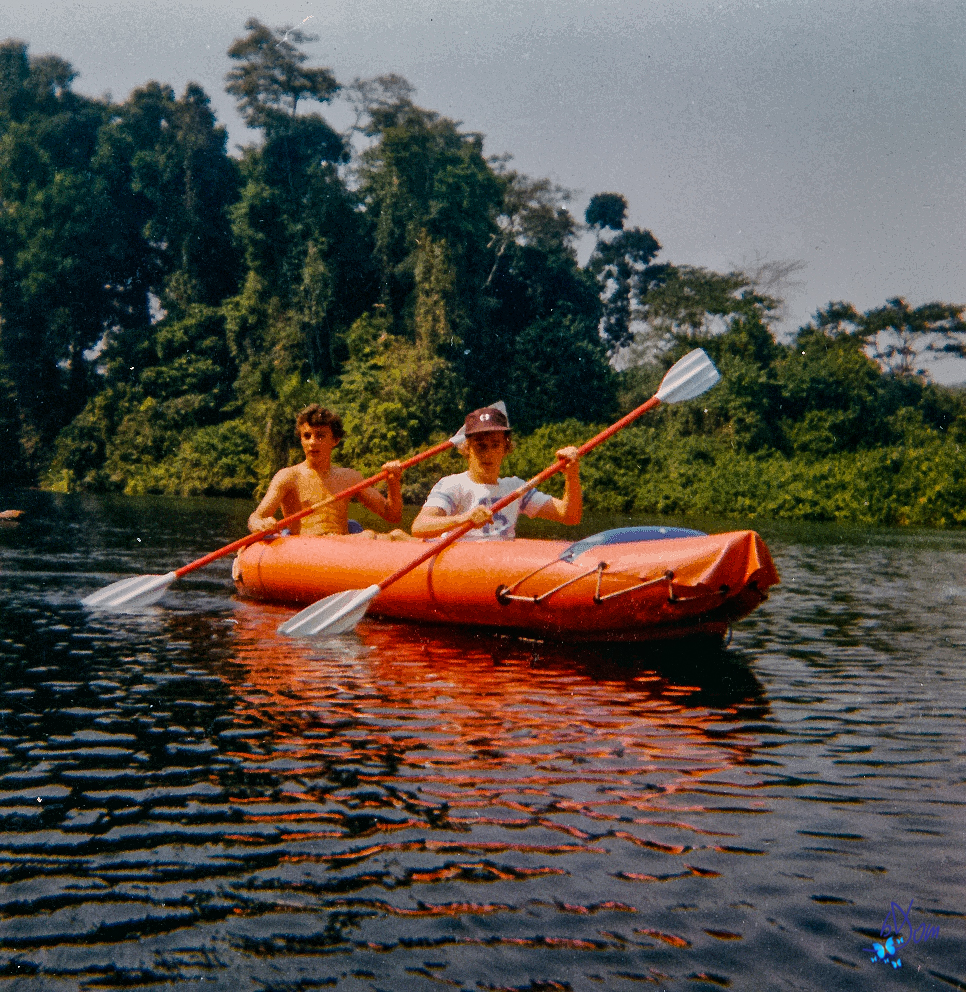
- Kayaking on Lake Fwa on the Fwa River

- Where the Fwa River flows into the Lubi River

Physical characteristics
- Mouth: Lubi River
  - location: Kasaï-Oriental and Kasaï-Central
  - coordinates: 5.71108°S 23.41759°E

The Fwa (French: Rivière Fwa) is a river in the Democratic Republic of the Congo in central Africa, flowing through Kasai-Oriental province. The river is a tributary of the Lubi River, which is a tributary to the Sankuru River, in the southeastern Congo River drainage basin.

== Fauna ==
The river is particularly notable for its diverse community of fish. This community includes five endemic cichlid species: Cyclopharynx fwae, C. schwetzi, Schwetzochromis neodon, Thoracochromis brauschi and T. callichromus.
