= Melanochromis lepidiadaptes =

Conservation status
- Critically Endangered (IUCN 3.1)

Scientific classification
- Kingdom: Animalia
- Phylum: Chordata
- Class: Actinopterygii
- Order: Cichliformes
- Family: Cichlidae
- Genus: Melanochromis
- Species: M. lepidiadaptes

Binomial name
- Melanochromis lepidiadaptes Bowers & Stauffer, 1997

Species of fish

Melanochromis lepidiadaptes is a species of cichlid endemic to Lake Malawi where it is only known from off of Makanjila Point on the southeastern shore. This species can grow to a length of 8.7 centimetres (3.4 in) SL.
