= Melanochromis dialeptos =

Conservation status
- Least Concern (IUCN 3.1)

Scientific classification
- Kingdom: Animalia
- Phylum: Chordata
- Class: Actinopterygii
- Order: Cichliformes
- Family: Cichlidae
- Genus: Melanochromis
- Species: M. dialeptos

Binomial name
- Melanochromis dialeptos Bowers & Stauffer, 1997

Species of fish

Melanochromis dialeptos is a species of cichlid endemic to Lake Malawi where it is only known from rocky habitats near Masinje. This species can grow to a length of 7.9 centimetres (3.1 in) SL.
