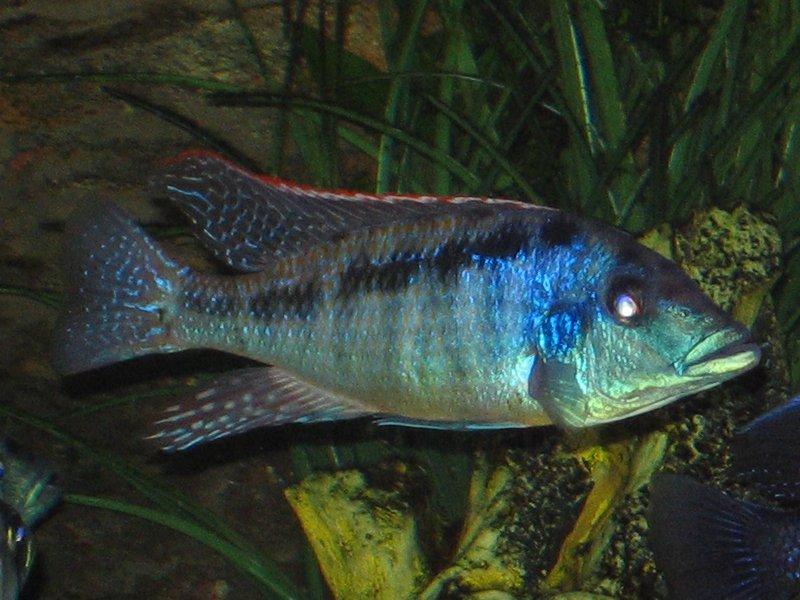
- L. acuticeps in the aquarium.

Conservation status
- Least Concern (IUCN 3.1)

Scientific classification
- Kingdom: Animalia
- Phylum: Chordata
- Class: Actinopterygii
- Order: Cichliformes
- Family: Cichlidae
- Tribe: Haplochromini
- Genus: Lichnochromis; Trewavas, 1935
- Species: L. acuticeps

Binomial name
- Lichnochromis acuticeps Trewavas, 1935

= Malawi gar =

Species of fish

The Malawi gar (Lichnochromis acuticeps) is a species of predatory cichlid endemic to Lake Malawi. This species can reach a length of 30 centimetres (12 in) TL. It can also be found in the aquarium trade. It is the only known species in its genus.
