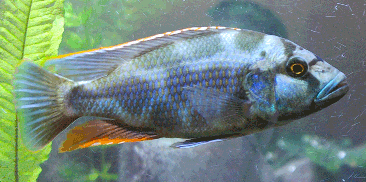
- Adult male Livingston's Cichlid (N. livingstonii)

Scientific classification
- Kingdom: Animalia
- Phylum: Chordata
- Class: Actinopterygii
- Division: Teleostei
- Order: Cichliformes
- Family: Cichlidae
- Subfamily: Pseudocrenilabrinae
- Tribe: Haplochromini
- Genus: Nimbochromis; Eccles & Trewavas, 1989

Type species
- Hemichromis livingstonii Günther, 1894

= Nimbochromis =

Sleeper cichlids

Genus of fishes

Nimbochromis is a genus of haplochromine cichlids mostly endemic to Lake Malawi in East Africa. They are known as sleeper cichlids or kaligono ("sleepers" in Chichewa) due to their unique hunting behaviour: these piscivorous species are often seen lying motionless on the lake bottom near rocks where mbuna live, even adopting an unusual sideways position rarely seen in living fish. When smaller fish approach, the Nimbochromis will "wake up" and try to seize them from ambush. Their coloration has an irregular dark cloudy pattern on lighter background (giving them their generic name) which provides camouflage, but it is also suspected that it is – at least in some species – evolving into aggressive mimicry (apparent death) by imitating a rotting fish carcass and thus luring scavengers to their demise.

== Species ==
There are currently five recognized species in this genus:

- Nimbochromis fuscotaeniatus (Regan, 1922) (Spothead Hap, Fuscotaeniatus Hap)
- Nimbochromis linni (W. E. Burgess & H. R. Axelrod, 1975)
- Nimbochromis livingstonii (Günther, 1894) (Livingston's Cichlid)
- Nimbochromis polystigma (Regan, 1922)
- Nimbochromis venustus (Boulenger, 1908) (Giraffe Hap, Venustus Hap)
