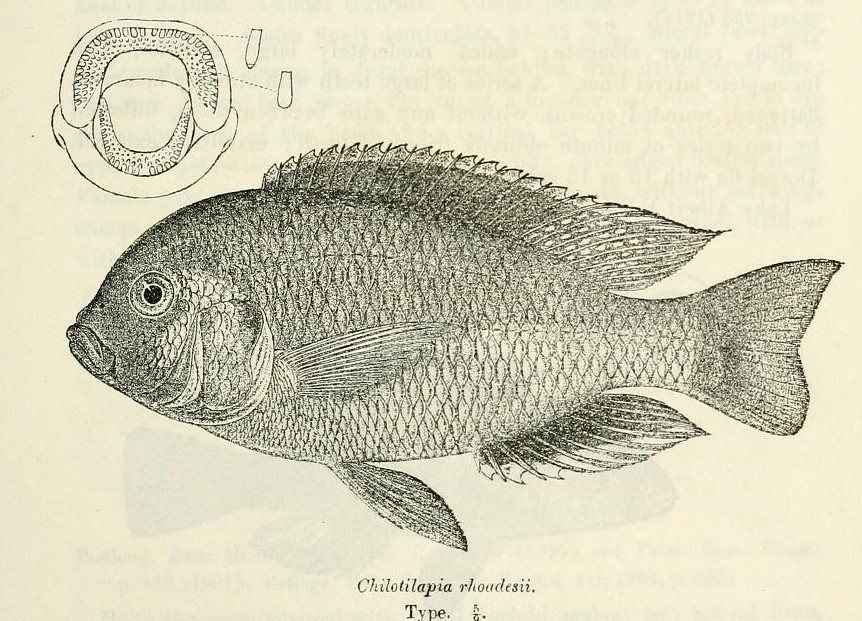

Conservation status
- Least Concern (IUCN 3.1)

Scientific classification
- Kingdom: Animalia
- Phylum: Chordata
- Class: Actinopterygii
- Order: Cichliformes
- Family: Cichlidae
- Subfamily: Pseudocrenilabrinae
- Tribe: Haplochromini
- Genus: Chilotilapia; Boulenger, 1908
- Species: C. rhoadesii

Binomial name
- Chilotilapia rhoadesii Boulenger, 1908

= Chilotilapia =

Malawi bream

Genus of fishes

Chilotilapia is a genus of freshwater fish in the cichlid family. It contains the sole species Chilotilapia rhoadesii, the Malawi bream, which is endemic to Lake Malawi in East Africa, where it prefers areas with muddy substrates from the shallows to quite deep waters. Its primary food consists of Melanoides and Lanistes snails. It can reach a length of 22.5 centimetres (8.9 in) TL. Though commonly called a "bream", this is due to its looks as it is quite unrelated to the breams proper, which are cypriniform fishes. This species is also found in the aquarium trade.
