= Melanochromis chipokae =

Conservation status
- Critically Endangered (IUCN 3.1)

Scientific classification
- Kingdom: Animalia
- Phylum: Chordata
- Class: Actinopterygii
- Order: Cichliformes
- Family: Cichlidae
- Genus: Melanochromis
- Species: M. chipokae

Binomial name
- Melanochromis chipokae D. S. Johnson, 1975

Synonyms
- Aulonocara chipokae (Johnson, 1975)

Species of fish

Melanochromis chipokae is a species of cichlid in the Cichlidae endemic to Lake Malawi where it is only known to occur at Chipoka. It lives in habitats characterized by patches of sand amongst rock. This piscivorous species can reach a length of 12 centimetres (4.7 in) SL. It can also be found in the aquarium trade, which is the main threat to this species and which has caused a 90% decline in the population. This has led to the IUCN assessing this species as Critically Endangered.

== See also ==
- List of freshwater aquarium fish species
