= Diplotaxodon aeneus =

Conservation status
- Least Concern (IUCN 3.1)

Scientific classification
- Kingdom: Animalia
- Phylum: Chordata
- Class: Actinopterygii
- Order: Cichliformes
- Family: Cichlidae
- Genus: Diplotaxodon
- Species: D. aeneus

Binomial name
- Diplotaxodon aeneus G. F. Turner & Stauffer, 1998

Species of fish

Diplotaxodon aeneus is a species of fish in the family Cichlidae. It is found in Malawi, Mozambique, and Tanzania. Its natural habitat is freshwater lakes.
