= Melanochromis simulans =

Conservation status
- Least Concern (IUCN 3.1)

Scientific classification
- Kingdom: Animalia
- Phylum: Chordata
- Class: Actinopterygii
- Order: Cichliformes
- Family: Cichlidae
- Genus: Melanochromis
- Species: M. simulans

Binomial name
- Melanochromis simulans Eccles, 1973

Species of fish

Melanochromis simulans is a species of cichlid endemic to Lake Malawi where it occurs in the Masinje Rocks and at Cape Ngombo. This species can reach a length of 7.4 centimetres (2.9 in) SL. It can also be found in the aquarium trade.
