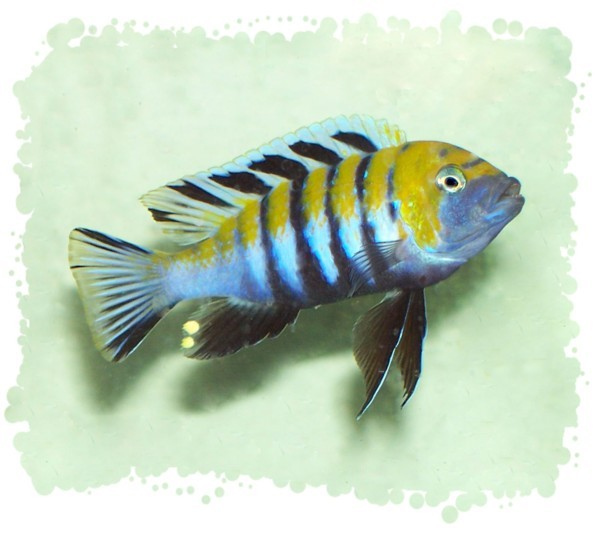

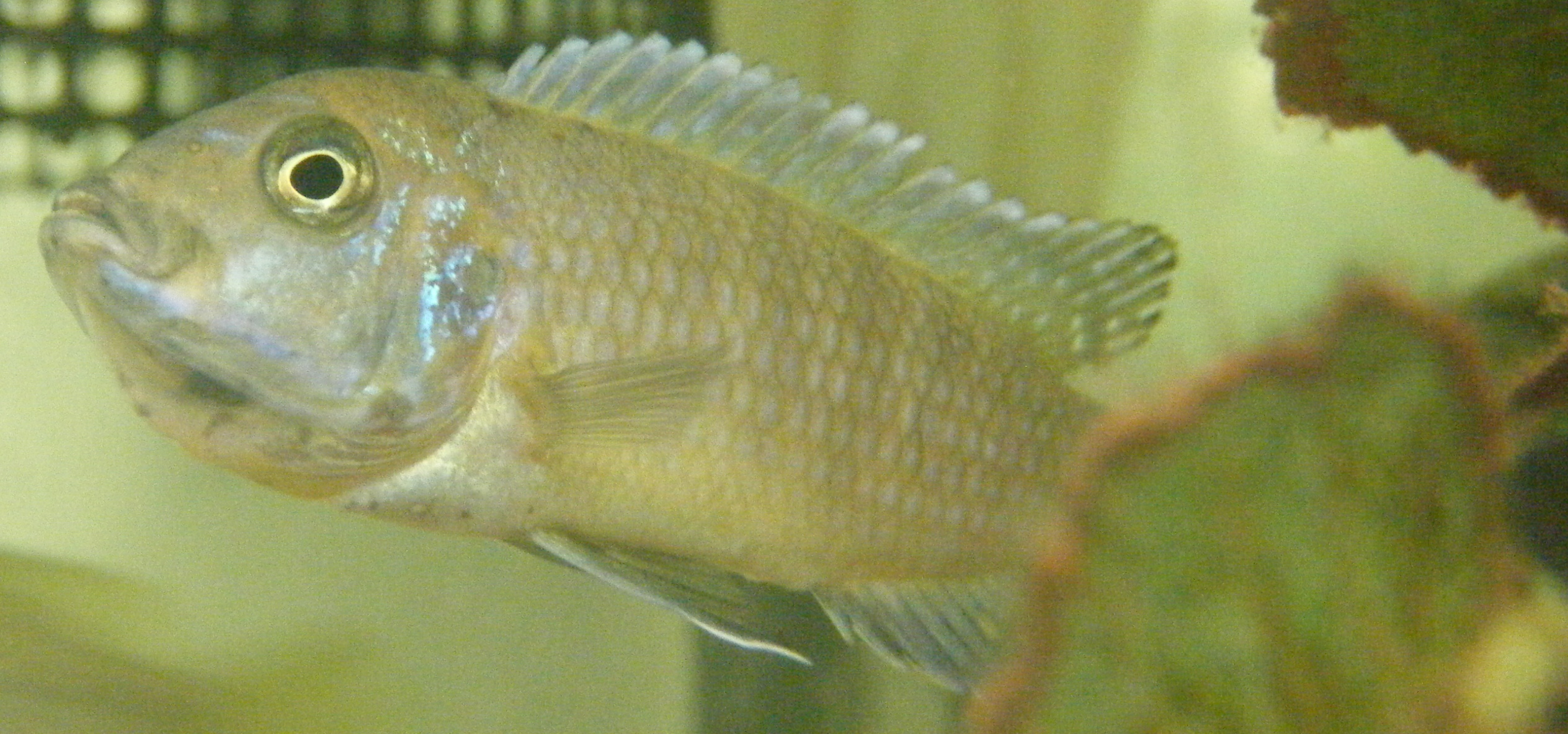
- Male "Cobue" variation (above) and female (below)

Conservation status
- Least Concern (IUCN 3.1)

Scientific classification
- Kingdom: Animalia
- Phylum: Chordata
- Class: Actinopterygii
- Order: Cichliformes
- Family: Cichlidae
- Genus: Cynotilapia
- Species: C. afra

Binomial name
- Cynotilapia afra (Günther, 1894)

Synonyms
- Hemichromis afer Günther, 1894; Paratilapia afer (Günther, 1894)

= Cynotilapia afra =

Afra cichlid

Species of fish

Cynotilapia afra, the afra cichlid or dogtooth cichlid, is a small species of cichlid fish from Lake Malawi in East Africa, where found in rocky habitats.

The genus name roughly translates as dogtooth cichlid (hence its common name) which describes the sharp, conical unicuspid teeth unique to this genus within the Lake Malawi species flock. This mbuna prefers a pH range of 7.5–8.5 and a temperature range of 23–27 °C.

The afra cichlid has an elongate body with vertical blue and black bars. However, there are many different coloration patterns depending on the region the fish is from, for example, the male fish from Cobue (usually seen spelled either Kobwe or Cobwe) is shown in the adjacent picture. The population from Jalo Reef show no yellow in the body but have a solid yellow dorsal fin. Other populations have no yellow highlights at all. Males can grow up to 10 cm., females usually somewhat smaller. Like most other cichlids from Lake Malawi, afras are mouthbrooders. Males defend territories near caves within the rock piles and feed from algae and micro-fauna on those rocks. Females congregate in mid-water and feed from plankton.

Other popular color variations are so named: Chewere, Chinuni, Chitande, Chuanga, Likoma, Lumbila, Lundu, Lupingu, Mbenji, Metangula, Minos Reef, Msobo, Ndumbi, Njambe, Nkhata Bay, and the Nkolongwe.

== Aquarium care ==
Like many mbuna, the afra is an aggressive and territorial fish that should be kept in a species-only or mixed mbuna tank. When mixing it is often better to avoid similar looking species. A common practice is to keep one male with several females, as afra are polygamous harem breeders. The tank arrangement should provide some open spaces but, have plenty of hiding spots and shelters.

== See also ==
- List of freshwater aquarium fish species
