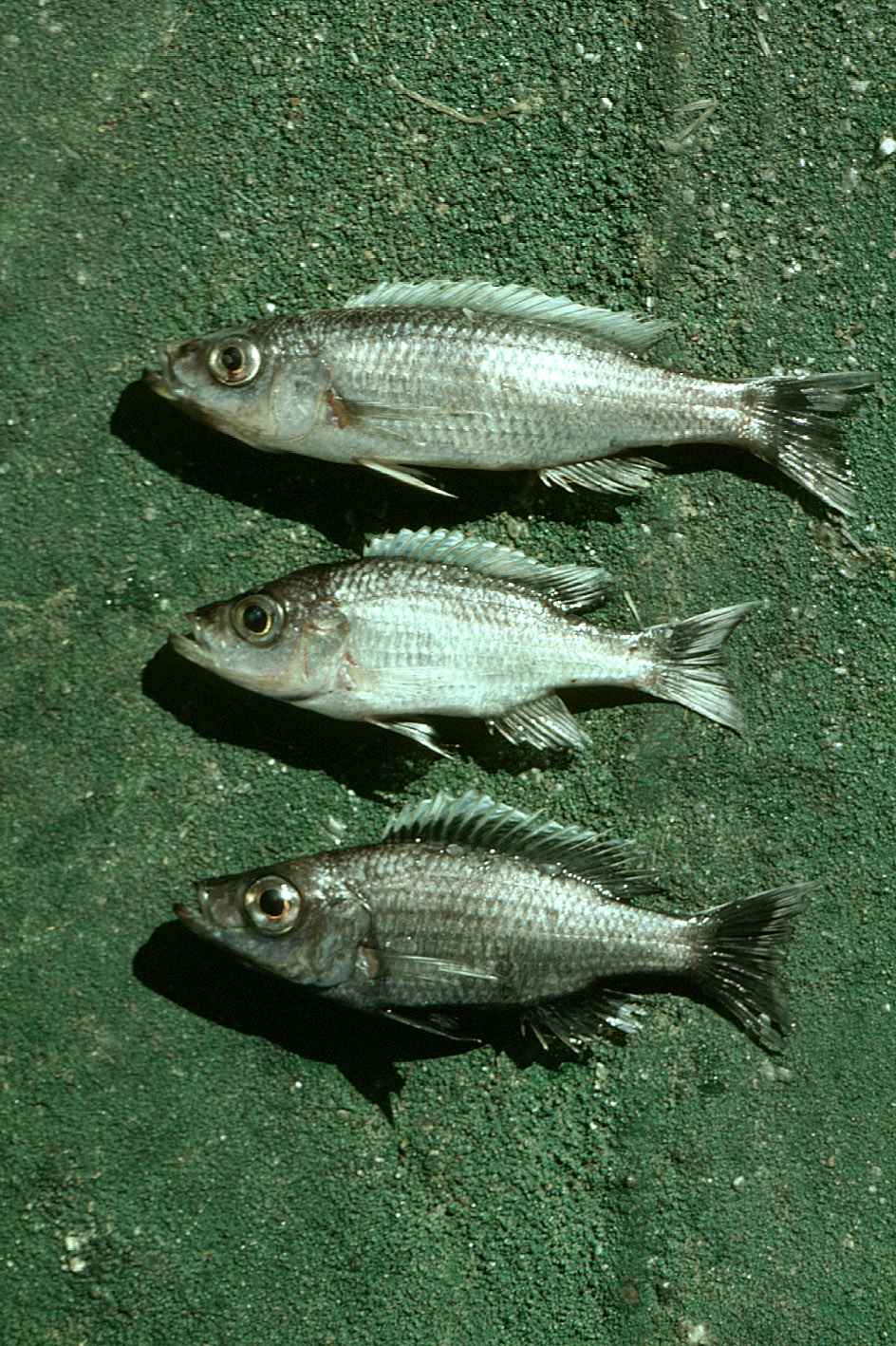
- From top, mature males of D. limnothrissa, D. apogon and D. macrops

Scientific classification
- Domain: Eukaryota
- Kingdom: Animalia
- Phylum: Chordata
- Class: Actinopterygii
- Order: Cichliformes
- Family: Cichlidae
- Tribe: Haplochromini
- Genus: Diplotaxodon; Trewavas, 1935

Type species
- Diplotaxodon argenteus Trewavas, 1935

= Diplotaxodon =

Genus of fishes

Diplotaxodon is a small genus of seven formally described, as well as a number of undescribed, deep-water species of cichlid fish endemic to Lake Malawi in east Africa. These fishes represent a remarkable adaptive radiation of offshore and deep-water adapted fish descended from ancestral shallow water forms. They include the dominant zooplankton-feeding fish of the offshore and deep-water regions of the lake, as well as a number of larger species that appear to feed on small pelagic fishes. Adult sizes range from 10 to 30 cm in total length, depending on species.

== Reproductive biology ==
Females and immature fish are silvery, like typical pelagic fish, but mature males develop stronger breeding colours, typically contrasting patterns of black, white and yellow. Females of several species have been found carrying eggs and young in their mouths and it is likely that all species are maternal mouthbrooders, like all other known haplochromine cichlids. Males in breeding dress with ripe gonads are often collected together in large numbers, along with a few ripe and mouthbrooding females, suggesting that these fishes gather together to breed in particular areas. Most species seem to breed between February and August. Females lay very few eggs- ranging on average from 16 to 40 in species examined. However, the eggs are very large - around 5-7mm in diameter. In common with other offshore-living cichlid fishes, these have evolved to have fewer, but larger offspring, perhaps to increase their chances of surviving predation and starvation in the open water habitats. Unlike some other offshore cichlid fish, none of the Diplotaxodon species are known to use inshore nursery areas for their young, and their entire life-cycle seems to be completed in the open waters of the lake.

== Evolution and population genetics ==
Molecular genetic studies suggest that Diplotaxodon species are all closely related and are ancestral to the more benthic-feeding Pallidochromis tokolosh, which together comprise a monophyletic group or clade which has evolved within Lake Malawi. Population genetic studies indicate that similar-looking forms with different male breeding colours represent distinct species. In marked contrast to the better known rocky shore 'mbuna' cichlids which are split into many geographically isolated populations on particular islands or rocky coastal regions, molecular studies indicate that there are few barriers to the movement and interbreeding of Diplotaxodon populations within the lake. This lack of geographic barriers in the present lake has made scientists consider that their species might have diverged either by the controversial mechanism of sympatric speciation. Alternatively, they may have diverged into new species when major droughts led to Lake Malawi partially drying up and forming 2 or more much smaller lakes.

== Human exploitation ==
Diplotaxodon species are important food fish around the lake, being collected by a number of small-scale fishing methods, such as Chirimila seines and baited hooks, as well as by trawling. Although they represent a potentially very large fishery stock (100,000 tonnes), with a potentially sustainable fishery yield of around 20,000 tonnes, their populations are spread thinly in inaccessible deep-water and offshore habitats, making them difficult to exploit economically, although some seasonal fisheries seem to exploit them heavily on traditional breeding grounds. A single species (D. limnothrissa) has occasionally been collected and bred as an aquarium fish.

== Species ==
As of 2021, there are 8 species of Diplotaxodon discovered with the most recent named as D. dentatus. During its discovery it was first inspected as D. argenteus because the teeth on oral jaws were fully exposed with closed mouth. It was then later separated from D. argenteus and named as D. dentatus because of the differences of its snout length.

- Diplotaxodon aeneus G. F. Turner & Stauffer, 1998
- Diplotaxodon altus Stauffer, Phiri & Konings, 2018
- Diplotaxodon apogon G. F. Turner & Stauffer, 1998
- Diplotaxodon argenteus Trewavas, 1935
- Diplotaxodon dentatus Stauffer & Konings, 2021
- Diplotaxodon ecclesi W. E. Burgess & H. R. Axelrod, 1973
- Diplotaxodon greenwoodi Stauffer & McKaye, 1986
- Diplotaxodon limnothrissa G. F. Turner, 1994
- Diplotaxodon longimaxilla Stauffer, Phiri & Konings, 2018
- Diplotaxodon macrops G. F. Turner & Stauffer, 1998
