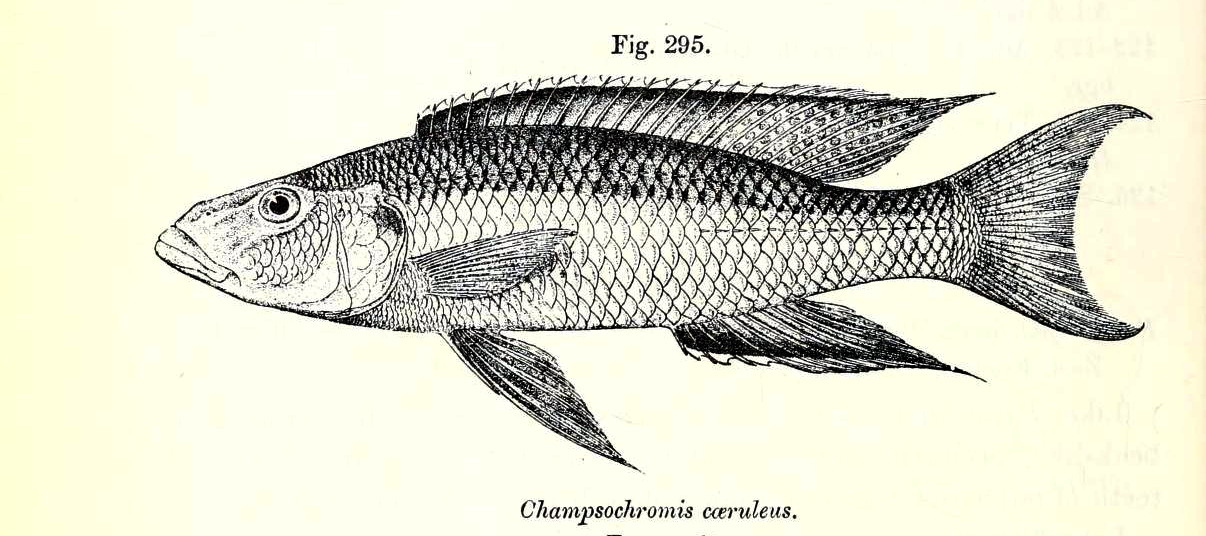

Scientific classification
- Kingdom: Animalia
- Phylum: Chordata
- Class: Actinopterygii
- Order: Cichliformes
- Family: Cichlidae
- Tribe: Haplochromini
- Genus: Champsochromis; Boulenger, 1915

Type species
- Paratilapia caerulea Boulenger, 1908

= Champsochromis =

Genus of fishes

Champsochromis is a small genus of cichlid fishes endemic to Lake Malawi in east Africa.

== Species ==
There are currently two recognized species in this genus:

- Champsochromis caeruleus (Boulenger, 1908)
- Champsochromis spilorhynchus (Regan, 1922)
