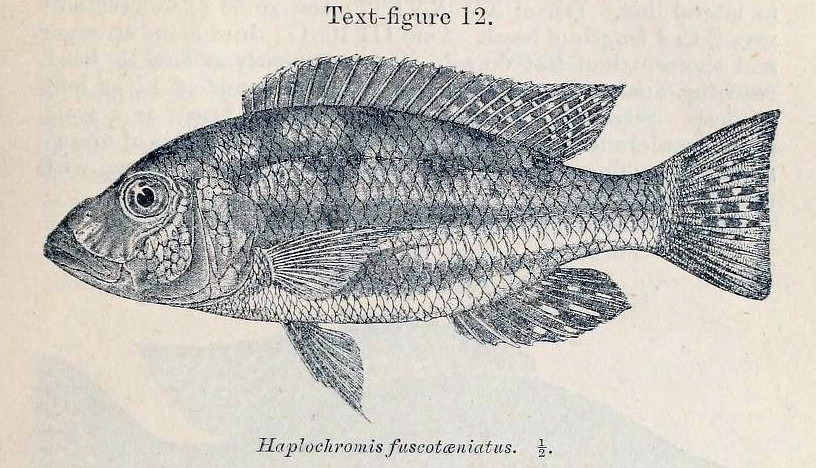

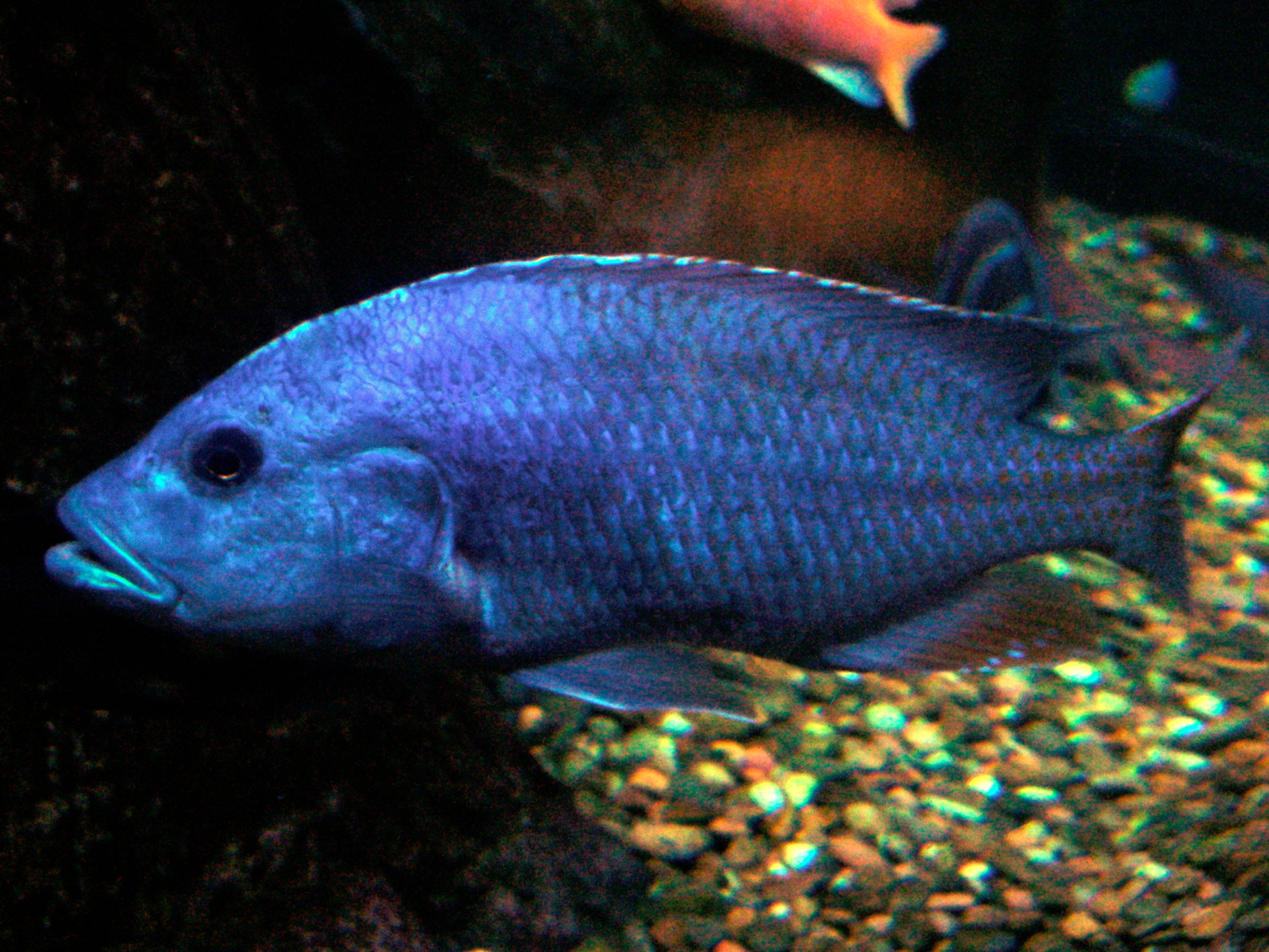
- male

Conservation status
- Vulnerable (IUCN 3.1)

Scientific classification
- Kingdom: Animalia
- Phylum: Chordata
- Class: Actinopterygii
- Order: Cichliformes
- Family: Cichlidae
- Genus: Nimbochromis
- Species: N. fuscotaeniatus

Binomial name
- Nimbochromis fuscotaeniatus (Regan, 1922)

Synonyms
- Haplochromis fuscotaeniatus Regan, 1922; Cyrtocara fuscotaeniatus (Regan, 1922); Cyrtocara fuscotaeniata (Regan, 1922)

= Nimbochromis fuscotaeniatus =

Species of fish

Nimbochromis fuscotaeniatus (spothead hap, fuscotaeniatus hap) is a species of cichlid endemic to Lake Malawi and Lake Malombe. Males of this species can reach a length of 25 centimetres (9.8 in) TL while the females grow to 20 centimetres (7.9 in) TL. It can also be found in the aquarium trade. It is an ambush predator and feeds on smaller cichlids. Females are smaller than males and a brownish color, while males are larger and blue in color. The species is a mouthbrooder that spawns readily in the aquarium.

== See also ==
- List of freshwater aquarium fish species
