= Enteromius greenwoodi =

Conservation status
- Data Deficient (IUCN 3.1)

Scientific classification
- Domain: Eukaryota
- Kingdom: Animalia
- Phylum: Chordata
- Class: Actinopterygii
- Order: Cypriniformes
- Family: Cyprinidae
- Subfamily: Smiliogastrinae
- Genus: Enteromius
- Species: E. greenwoodi

Binomial name
- Enteromius greenwoodi (Poll, 1967)

Synonyms
- Barbus greenwoodi Poll, 1967

Species of fish

Enteromius greenwoodi is a species of ray-finned fish in the genus Enteromius from Angola.

== Size ==
This species reaches a length of 3.1 cm (1.2 in).

== Etymology ==
The fish is named in honor of Peter Humphry Greenwood (1927-1995), the Curator of the Fish Section of the British Museum (Natural History), and author of many papers on African fishes in general and Enteromius in particular.
