= Cyclopharynx =

Scientific classification
- Kingdom: Animalia
- Phylum: Chordata
- Class: Actinopterygii
- Order: Cichliformes
- Family: Cichlidae
- Tribe: Haplochromini
- Genus: Cyclopharynx; Poll, 1948

Type species
- Cyclopharynx fwae Poll, 1948

Genus of fishes

Cyclopharynx is a small genus of two species of cichlid fish. Both species are endemic to the Fwa River in Democratic Republic of the Congo.

== Species ==
- Cyclopharynx fwae Poll, 1948
- Cyclopharynx schwetzi (Poll, 1948)
