= Melanochromis baliodigma =

Conservation status
- Least Concern (IUCN 3.1)

Scientific classification
- Kingdom: Animalia
- Phylum: Chordata
- Class: Actinopterygii
- Order: Cichliformes
- Family: Cichlidae
- Genus: Melanochromis
- Species: M. baliodigma

Binomial name
- Melanochromis baliodigma Bowers & Stauffer, 1997

Synonyms
- Melanochromis xanthodigma Bowers & Stauffer, 1997

Species of fish

Melanochromis baliodigma is a species of cichlid endemic to Lake Malawi where it is only known from the area around Membe Point in areas where sandy bottoms meet up with rocky areas. This species can grow to a length of 6.7 centimetres (2.6 in) SL.
