= Melanochromis heterochromis =

Conservation status
- Least Concern (IUCN 3.1)

Scientific classification
- Kingdom: Animalia
- Phylum: Chordata
- Class: Actinopterygii
- Order: Cichliformes
- Family: Cichlidae
- Genus: Melanochromis
- Species: M. heterochromis

Binomial name
- Melanochromis heterochromis Bowers & Stauffer, 1993

Species of fish

Melanochromis heterochromis is a species of cichlid endemic to Lake Malawi. This species can grow to a length of 9.7 centimetres (3.8 in) SL.
