= Haplochromis brauschi =

Conservation status
- Least Concern (IUCN 3.1)

Scientific classification
- Kingdom: Animalia
- Phylum: Chordata
- Class: Actinopterygii
- Order: Cichliformes
- Family: Cichlidae
- Genus: Haplochromis
- Species: H. brauschi

Binomial name
- Haplochromis brauschi Poll & Thys van den Audenaerde, 1965

Synonyms
- Thoracochromis brauschi (Poll & Thys van den Audenaerde, 1965)

Species of fish

Haplochromis brauschi is a species of cichlid endemic to the Fwa River in the Congo Basin, Democratic Republic of the Congo. This species can reach a length of 10.1 centimetres (4.0 in) TL.
