= Melanochromis robustus =

Conservation status
- Near Threatened (IUCN 3.1)

Scientific classification
- Kingdom: Animalia
- Phylum: Chordata
- Class: Actinopterygii
- Order: Cichliformes
- Family: Cichlidae
- Genus: Melanochromis
- Species: M. robustus

Binomial name
- Melanochromis robustus D. S. Johnson, 1985

Species of fish

Melanochromis robustus is a species of cichlid in the Cichlidae endemic to Lake Malawi. This species can reach a length of 20 centimetres (7.9 in) TL.
