= Schwetzochromis neodon =

Conservation status
- Least Concern (IUCN 3.1)

Scientific classification
- Kingdom: Animalia
- Phylum: Chordata
- Class: Actinopterygii
- Order: Cichliformes
- Family: Cichlidae
- Genus: Schwetzochromis
- Species: S. neodon

Binomial name
- Schwetzochromis neodon Poll, 1948

Synonyms
- Neopharynx neodon (Poll, 1948); Haplochromis rheophilus Poll, 1948

Species of fish

Schwetzochromis neodon is a species of rheophilic cichlid endemic to the Democratic Republic of the Congo where it is only known from the Fwa River in the Congo Basin. It can reach a length of 10.7 centimetres (4.2 in) SL. It is currently the only known member of its genus, but several others that formerly were included have been moved to Orthochromis.
