= Haplochromis rufocaudalis =

Conservation status
- Least Concern (IUCN 3.1)

Scientific classification
- Kingdom: Animalia
- Phylum: Chordata
- Class: Actinopterygii
- Order: Cichliformes
- Family: Cichlidae
- Genus: Haplochromis
- Species: H. rufocaudalis

Binomial name
- Haplochromis rufocaudalis (Seehausen & Bouton, 1998)

Synonyms
- Neochromis rufocaudalis Seehausen & Bouton, 1998

Species of fish

Haplochromis rufocaudalis is a species of cichlid endemic to Lake Victoria where it is known with certainty from Sengerema, the Speke Gulf and Mwanza Gulf though it may occur in other locations. This species can reach a length of 10 centimetres (3.9 in) SL.
