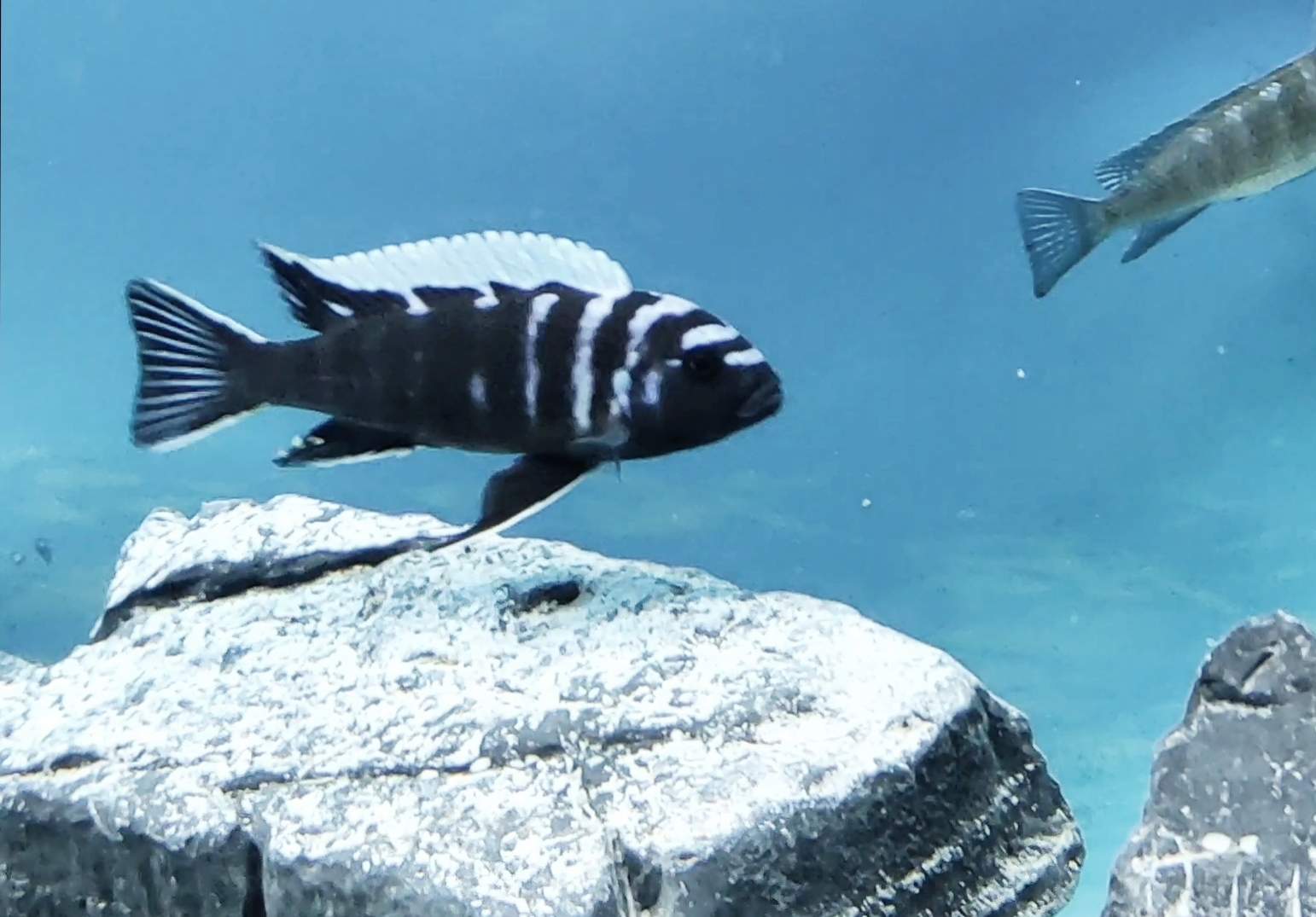
- Cynotilapia zebroides in Lake Malawi

Conservation status
- Least Concern (IUCN 3.1)

Scientific classification
- Kingdom: Animalia
- Phylum: Chordata
- Class: Actinopterygii
- Order: Cichliformes
- Family: Cichlidae
- Genus: Cynotilapia
- Species: C. zebroides

Binomial name
- Cynotilapia zebroides (D. S. Johnson, 1975)

Synonyms
- Microchromis zebroides Johnson, 1975

= Cynotilapia zebroides =

Species of fish

Cynotilapia zebroides is a species of cichlid endemic to Lake Malawi where it is only known to occur around Likoma Island where it prefers shallow, rocky areas. This species can reach a length of 8.6 centimetres (3.4 in) TL. This species can also be found in the aquarium trade where it is known as the Mini-zebra.
