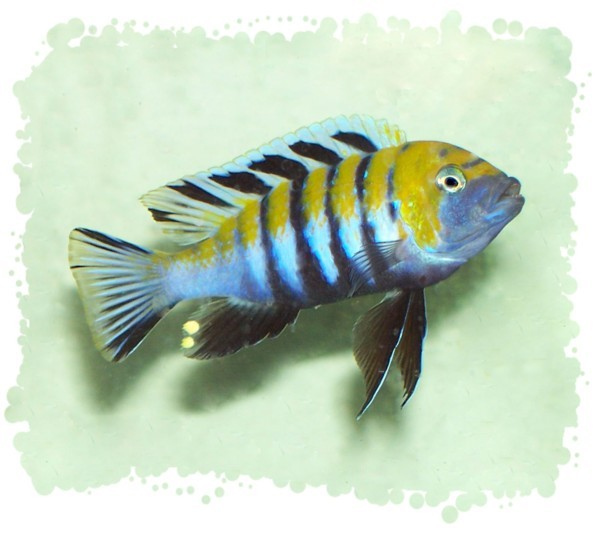
- C. afra

Scientific classification
- Kingdom: Animalia
- Phylum: Chordata
- Class: Actinopterygii
- Division: Teleostei
- Order: Cichliformes
- Family: Cichlidae
- Tribe: Haplochromini
- Genus: Cynotilapia; Regan, 1922

Type species
- Hemichromis afer Günther, 1894

Synonyms
- Microchromis Johnson, 1975

= Cynotilapia =

Genus of fishes

Cynotilapia is a genus of haplochromine cichlids. All fishes in these genus form part of the mbuna flock, the rock-dwelling fishes of Lake Malawi, in the rift valley of East Africa. All species are polygamous, maternal, ovophile mouthbrooders and carry their fry in this fashion for about 20–30 days.

== Species ==
There are currently 5 recognized species in this genus.

- Cynotilapia afra (Günther, 1894)
- Cynotilapia aurifrons (Tawil, 2011)
- Cynotilapia axelrodi W. E. Burgess, 1976
- Cynotilapia chilundu Li, Konings & Stauffer, 2016
- Cynotilapia zebroides (D. S. Johnson, 1975)
