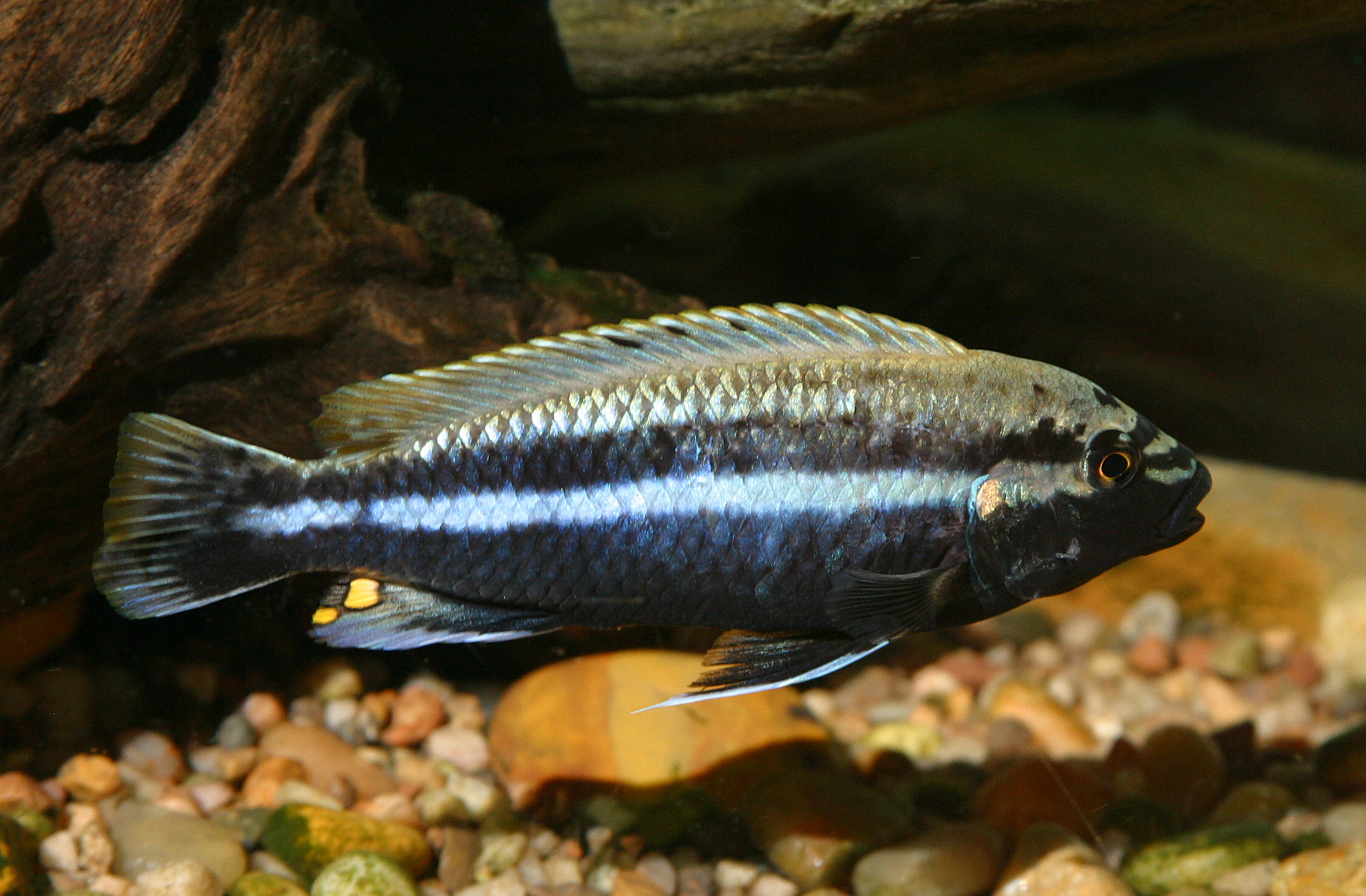
- An adult male auratus cichlid
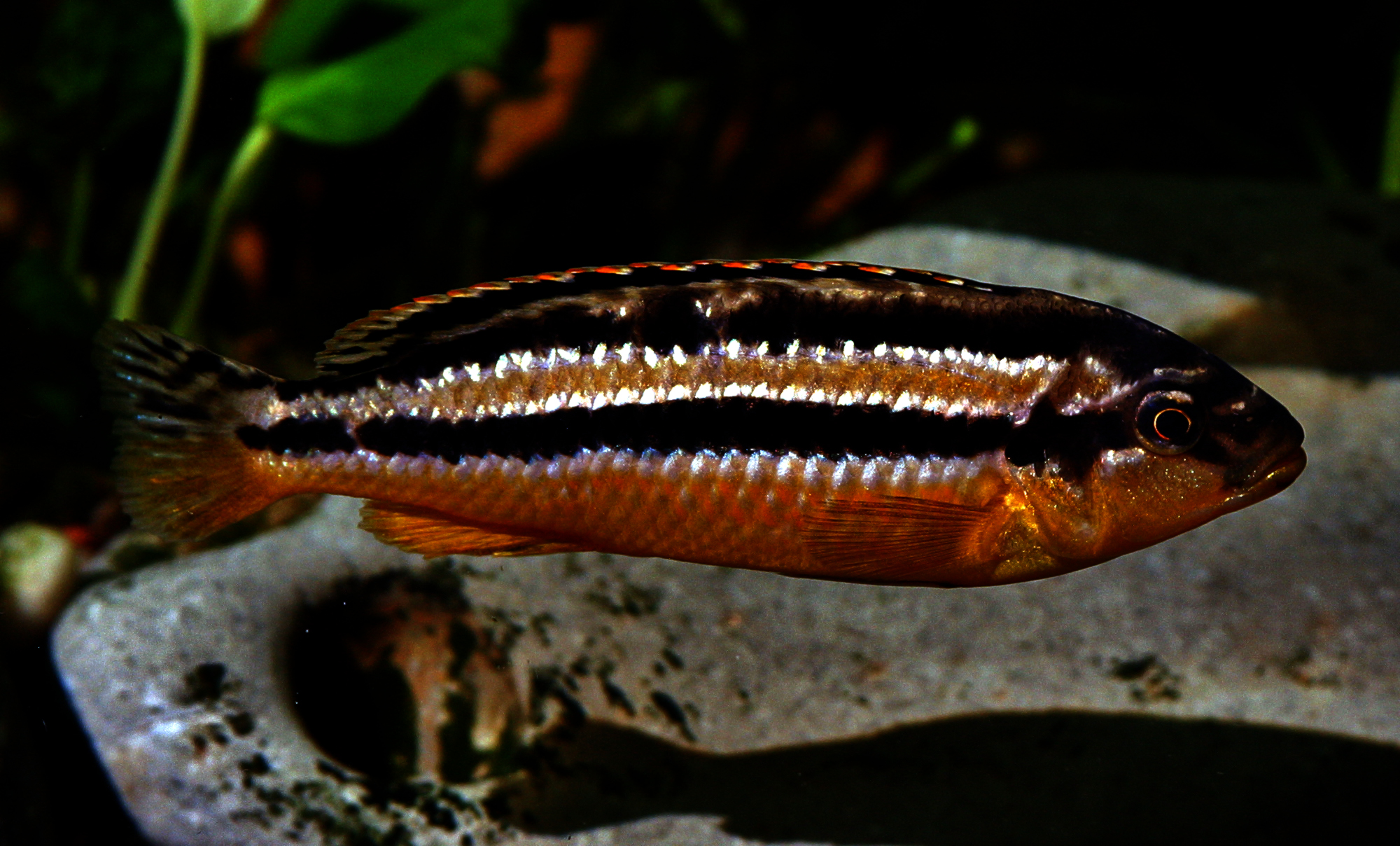
- An adult female auratus cichlid

Conservation status
- Least Concern (IUCN 3.1)

Scientific classification
- Kingdom: Animalia
- Phylum: Chordata
- Class: Actinopterygii
- Division: Teleostei
- Order: Cichliformes
- Family: Cichlidae
- Genus: Melanochromis
- Species: M. auratus

Binomial name
- Melanochromis auratus (Boulenger, 1897)

Synonyms
- Chromis auratus Boulenger, 1897; Pseudotropheus auratus (Boulenger, 1897); Tilapia aurata (Boulenger, 1897)

= Melanochromis auratus =

Species of fish

Melanochromis auratus, the auratus cichlid, is a freshwater fish of the cichlid family. It is also known as golden mbuna and Malawi golden cichlid. It is endemic to the southern region of Lake Malawi, particularly from Jalo Reef southward along the entire western coast down to Crocodile Rocks.

== Description ==
Auratus cichlids are small, elongate fish that can grow up to 11 centimetres (4.3 in). Juveniles and females are bright yellow with black and white stripes on the upper half of the body. Adult male coloration is drastically different with dark brown or black body and light blue or yellow stripes on the upper half of the body.

== In the Aquarium ==
The auratus cichlid is one of the most popular mbuna cichlids in the aquarium trade. In aquarium stores, there will usually be one dominant male that is colored black, the rest will display the submissive "female" coloration of yellow. If this male is sold, the next dominant male will take on the black color. When female *Auratus* are kept without a male for an extended period, one of the females often permanently changes color to resemble a male and assumes the role of the dominant individual. This also applies when only a single female is kept.

== Reproduction ==
Like many other cichlids from Lake Malawi, auratus cichlids are mouthbrooders. Females hold their fertilized eggs and fry in their mouth for a few weeks before releasing the fry.

== See also ==
- Mbuna
- List of freshwater aquarium fish species
