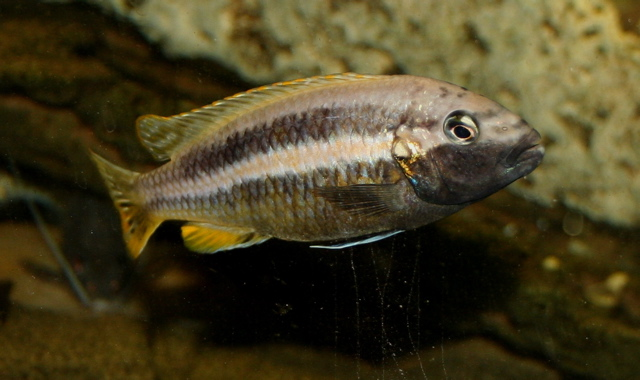
- Male Golden Mbuna (Melanochromis auratus)

Scientific classification
- Kingdom: Animalia
- Phylum: Chordata
- Class: Actinopterygii
- Order: Cichliformes
- Family: Cichlidae
- Tribe: Haplochromini
- Genus: Melanochromis; Trewavas, 1935

Type species
- Melanochromis melanopterus Trewavas, 1935

= Melanochromis =

Genus of fishes

Melanochromis is a genus of haplochromine cichlids endemic to Lake Malawi in Eastern Africa. Ecologically, they belong to the rock-dwelling mbuna cichlids of Lake Malawi.

Melanochromis are typically small, slim but muscular fishes with lengthwise stripes of black, yellow and blue. They usually display strong sexual dichromatism.

== Species ==
There are currently 15 recognized species in this genus:

- Melanochromis auratus (Boulenger, 1897) (Golden Mbuna, Auratus Cichlid, Malawi Golden Cichlid)
- Melanochromis baliodigma Bowers & Stauffer, 1997
- Melanochromis chipokae D. S. Johnson, 1975
- Melanochromis dialeptos Bowers & Stauffer, 1997
- Melanochromis heterochromis Bowers & Stauffer, 1993
- Melanochromis kaskazini Konings-Dudin, Konings & Stauffer, 2009
- Melanochromis lepidiadaptes Bowers & Stauffer, 1997
- Melanochromis loriae D. S. Johnson, 1975
- Melanochromis melanopterus Trewavas, 1935
- Melanochromis mossambiquensis Konings-Dudin, Konings & Stauffer, 2009
- Melanochromis mpoto Konings & Stauffer, 2012.
- Melanochromis robustus D. S. Johnson, 1985
- Melanochromis simulans Eccles, 1973
- Melanochromis vermivorus Trewavas, 1935 (Purple Mbuna)
- Melanochromis wochepa Konings-Dudin, Konings & Stauffer, 2009
