= Haplochromis omnicaeruleus =

Conservation status
- Least Concern (IUCN 3.1)

Scientific classification
- Kingdom: Animalia
- Phylum: Chordata
- Class: Actinopterygii
- Order: Cichliformes
- Family: Cichlidae
- Genus: Haplochromis
- Species: H. omnicaeruleus

Binomial name
- Haplochromis omnicaeruleus (Seehausen & Bouton, 1998)

Synonyms
- Neochromis omnicaeruleus Seehausen & Bouton, 1998

Species of fish

Haplochromis omnicaeruleus is a species of cichlid endemic to Lake Victoria where it is known from the southeastern portion of the lake. This species can reach a length of 11.9 centimetres (4.7 in) SL.
