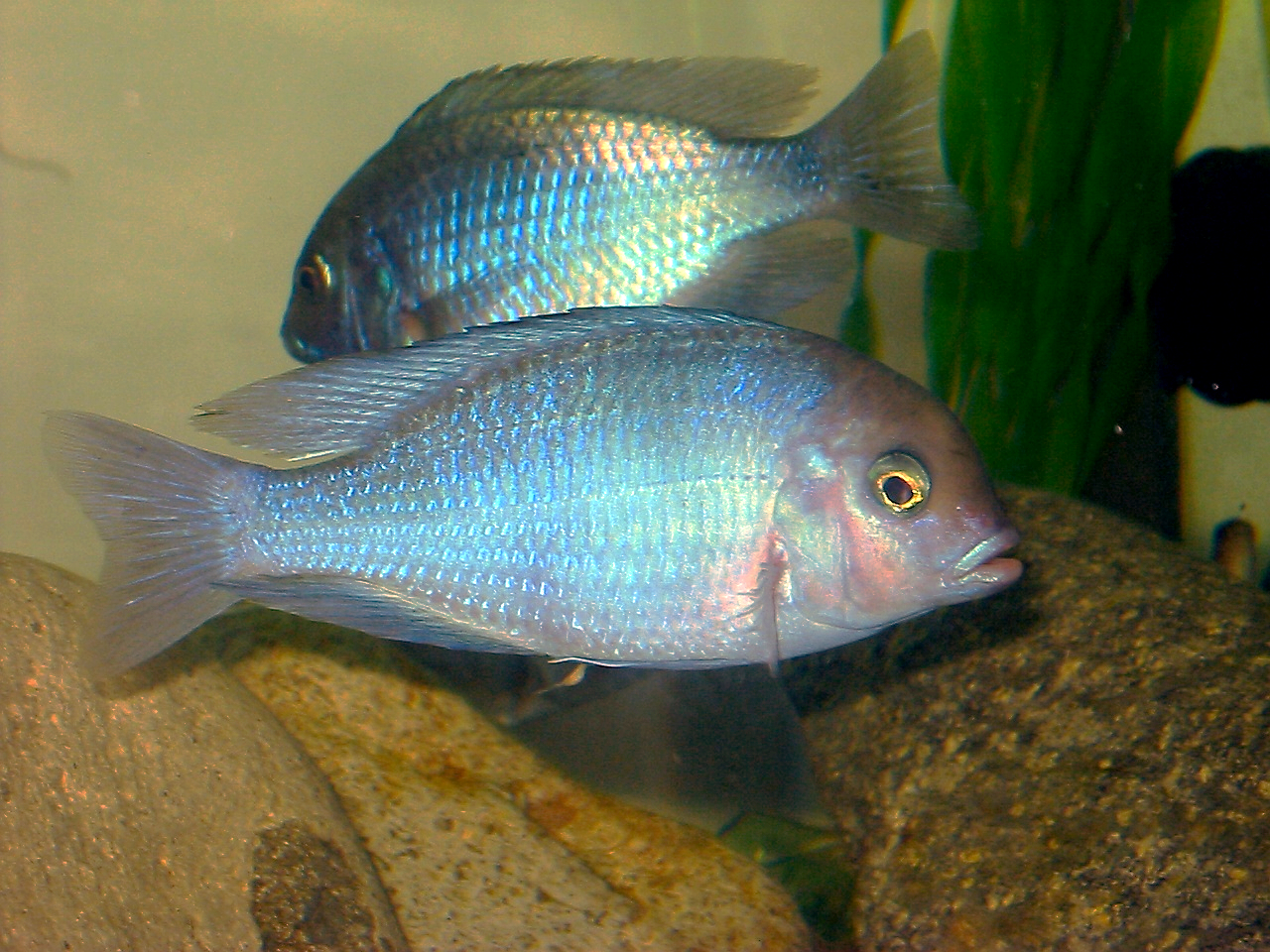

Conservation status
- Vulnerable (IUCN 3.1)

Scientific classification
- Kingdom: Animalia
- Phylum: Chordata
- Class: Actinopterygii
- Order: Cichliformes
- Family: Cichlidae
- Subfamily: Pseudocrenilabrinae
- Tribe: Haplochromini
- Genus: Cyrtocara; Boulenger, 1902
- Species: C. moorii

Binomial name
- Cyrtocara moorii Boulenger, 1902

= Cyrtocara =

Genus of fishes

Cyrtocara moorii, commonly known as the hump-head, is a species of haplochromine cichlid endemic to Lake Malawi in east Africa where they prefer areas with sandy substrates. It can grow to a length of 20 centimetres (7.9 in) TL. The species is popular among aquarium keepers where it is known as the hump-head cichlid, blue dolphin cichlid, Malawi dolphin or simply as moorii. It is currently the only known member of its genus. The specific name honours the English cytologist and biologist John Edmund Sharrock Moore (1870-1947).

== Description ==
They are varying shades of blue, ranging from turquoise to a silvery-blue, and grow a distinctive hump on their forehead. The male is usually brighter blue than the female.

== Aquarium care ==
The Malawi dolphin is best kept at temperatures of 75–78 °F (24–26 °C). It is relatively tame except when it is spawning.

The minimum aquarium size should be 48 US gallons (180 L; 40 imp gal) but increased as the fish grows larger.

== See also ==
- List of freshwater aquarium fish species
