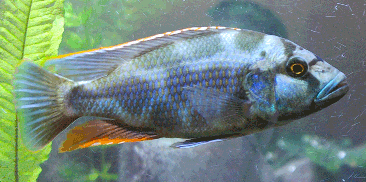
- An adult male
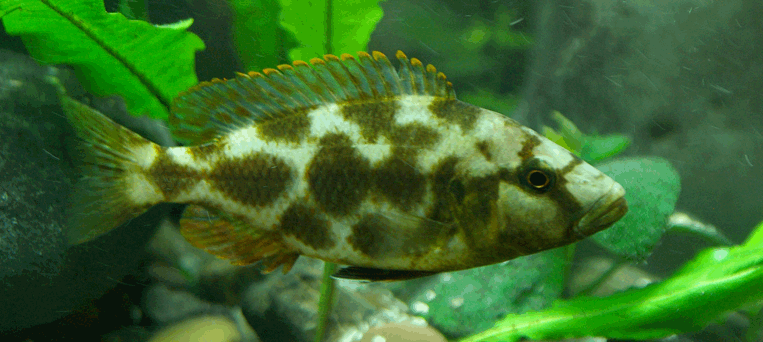
- A juvenile

Conservation status
- Least Concern (IUCN 3.1)

Scientific classification
- Kingdom: Animalia
- Phylum: Chordata
- Class: Actinopterygii
- Order: Cichliformes
- Family: Cichlidae
- Genus: Nimbochromis
- Species: N. livingstonii

Binomial name
- Nimbochromis livingstonii (Günther, 1894)

Synonyms
- Hemichromis livingstonii Günther, 1894; Astatotilapia livingstonii (Günther, 1894); Cyrtocara livingstonii (Günther, 1894); Haplochromis livingstonii (Günther, 1894); Paratilapia livingstonii (Günther, 1894)

= Nimbochromis livingstonii =

Species of fish

Nimbochromis livingstonii, Livingston's cichlid or, kalingono (in Chichewa), is a freshwater mouthbrooding cichlid native to Lake Malawi, an African Rift Lake. It is also found in the upper Shire River and Lake Malombe. They are found in inshore areas of the lake over sandy substrates. This species is thought to be one of the cichlids that feign death in order to lure their prey closer for a sudden strike and capture, a trait shared by other Nimbochromis spp. and some other cichlids.

== Taxonomy ==
The fish's unique hunting method gives it its Chichewan name, kalingono, which means "sleeper".

The generic name Nimbochromis is a combination of the Latin word nimbus and Greek chromis. Thus the genus could be translated as "clouded chromis", alluding to the fish's distinctive dark mottling (or "clouded" pattern) on white base coloration.

The identity of the person honoured in the specific name is not given in Günther's description but it is presumably Dr. David Livingstone (1813-1873) who was the first known European to discover Lake Malawi in 1856, collecting the first specimens of fish from the Lake.

== Morphology ==
The Livingston's cichlid is a laterally compressed fish with a large mouth. The maximum reported length of male fish in the wild is 25 centimetres (9.8 in) TL while females reach 20 centimetres (7.9 in) TL. The colouration is variable but typically mottled brown and white. The dorsal fin may be blue while maintaining an orange to red band and sometimes a white line. Adult males frequently "color up" in response to changing conditions and rapidly change from spotted camouflage to brilliant blues and greens, and may even exhibit a pale golden tone. Breeding males turn a dark blue which almost completely obscures their blotched pattern. The anal fin is usually orange to red. Females are similar, but usually lack the yellow "egg spot" markings on the anal fin. Juveniles display a brown and white spotted pattern.

== Biology ==
Wild and Aquarium specimens have been observed to lie on the substrate as if dead, waiting for small fish to come close in search of a meal; the distinctive colouration of this species is said to mimic that of a dead fish, and may aid its disguise. When a suitable target comes within range, the fish quickly lunges at the prey and usually attempts to swallow it whole. Wild fish feed primarily on small fish, in particular Lethrinops spp.

Males mate with multiple females; the female incubates up to 100 eggs in her mouth until they hatch and the fry becomes free swimming, much like the Astatotilapia burtoni which is of the same tribe.

== Economic importance ==
Nimbochromis livingstonii is fished locally for food and is also collected and traded as an aquarium fish.

== See also ==
- List of freshwater aquarium fish species
