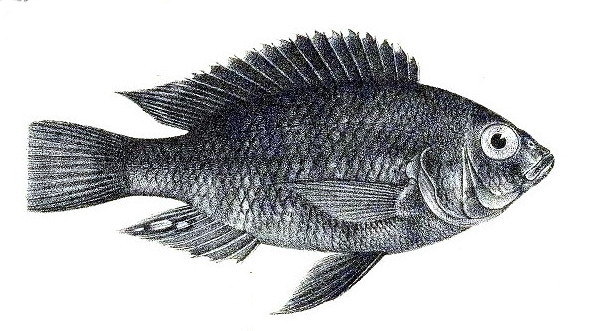

Conservation status
- Data Deficient (IUCN 3.1)

Scientific classification
- Kingdom: Animalia
- Phylum: Chordata
- Class: Actinopterygii
- Order: Cichliformes
- Family: Cichlidae
- Genus: Haplochromis
- Species: H. nigricans

Binomial name
- Haplochromis nigricans (Boulenger, 1906)

Synonyms
- Tilapia nigricans Boulenger, 1906; Coptodon nigricans (Boulenger, 1906); Neochromis nigricans (Boulenger, 1906)

= Haplochromis nigricans =

Species of fish

Haplochromis nigricans is a species of cichlid endemic to Lake Victoria where it is known only known with certainty from Entebbe, Uganda, other populations now placed in H. rufocaudalis. Its preferred habitat is shallow waters with rocky substrates. This species can reach a length of 9.4 centimetres (3.7 in) SL.
