= Humphry Greenwood =

English ichthyologist

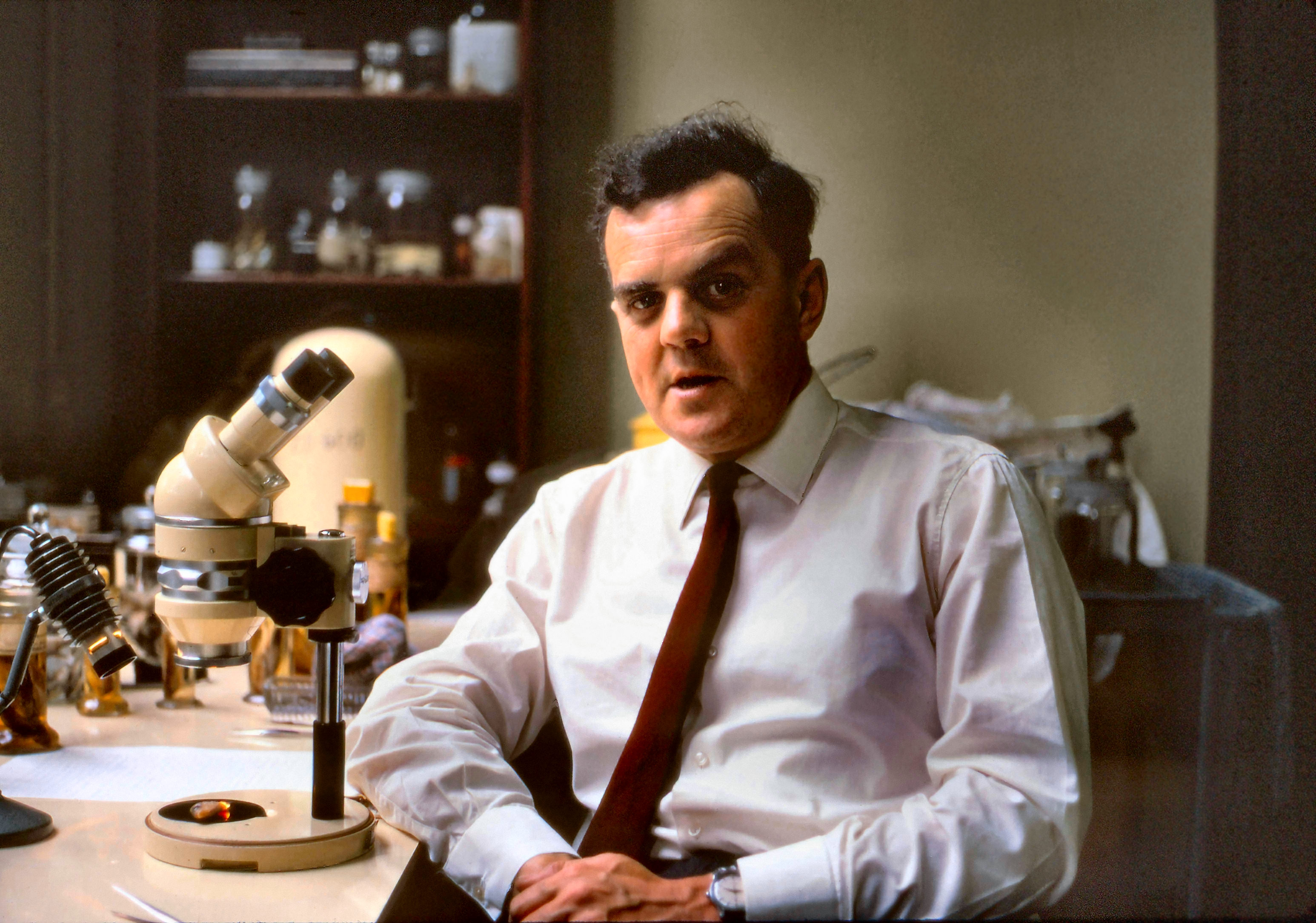
P. Humphry Greenwood

Peter Humphry Greenwood FRS FIBiol (21 April 1927 – 3 March 1995) was an English ichthyologist. He was elected a Fellow of the Royal Society in 1985. He was known for his work on the species flocks of cichlids in the African Great Lakes, and for studies of the phylogeny and systematics of teleosts.

== Tribute ==
The cichlid fish Diplotaxodon greenwoodi is named for him. Brachyaetoides greenwoodi Bonde, 2008 and Enteromius greenwoodi (Poll 1967) are also named for him.

== Personal life ==
Humphry married fellow student Marjorie George (1924–2006) in 1950.

== See also ==
- Category:Taxa named by Humphry Greenwood
