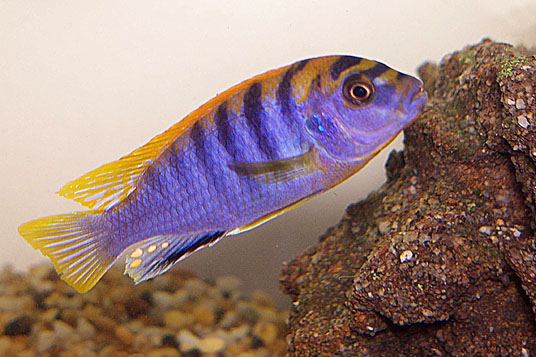
- A male of the undescribed (as of 2009) Labidochromis sp. 'Hongi Island'

Scientific classification
- Kingdom: Animalia
- Phylum: Chordata
- Class: Actinopterygii
- Division: Teleostei
- Order: Cichliformes
- Family: Cichlidae
- Subfamily: Pseudocrenilabrinae
- Tribe: Haplochromini; Poll, 1986

Synonyms
- Haplochrominae Hoedeman, 1947; Pseudocrenilabrini Fowler, 1935

= Haplochromine =

Haplochromines

Tribe of fishes

The haplochromine cichlids are a tribe of cichlids in subfamily Pseudocrenilabrinae called Haplochromini. This group includes the type genus Haplochromis plus a number of closely related genera such as Aulonocara, Astatotilapia, and Chilotilapia. They are endemic to eastern, southern and northern Africa, except for Astatotilapia flaviijosephi in the Middle East. A common name in a scientific context is East African cichlids—while they are not restricted to that region, they are the dominant Cichlidae there. This tribe was extensively studied by Ethelwynn Trewavas, who made major reviews in 1935 and 1989, at the beginning and at the end of her career in ichthyology. Even today, numerous new species are being described each year.

The haplochromines were in older times treated as subfamily Haplochrominae, However, the great African radiation of pseudocrenilabrine cichlids is certainly not monophyletic without them, and thus they are today ranked as a tribe therein. They do include, however, the type genus of the subfamily Pseudocrenilabrus. Since taxonomic tribes are treated like genera for purposes of biological nomenclature according to the ICZN, the Haplochromis is the type genus of this tribe, and not the (later-described) Pseudocrenilabrus, even though the tribe name Pseudocrenilabrini was proposed earlier.

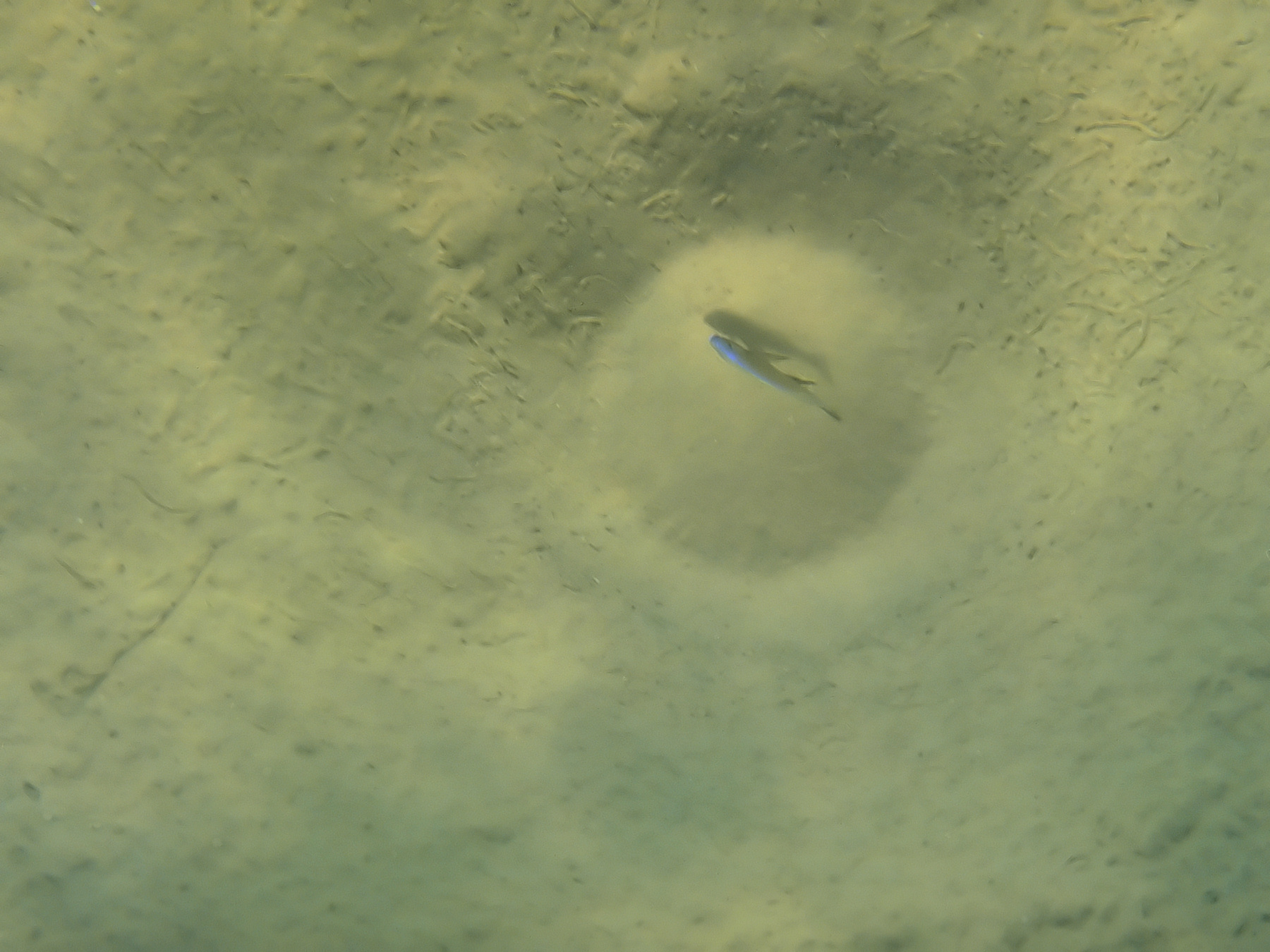
Male Copadichromis (probably C. azureus) guarding his nest-site in Lake Malawi

In the African Great Lakes, there has been an amazing adaptive radiation of Haplochromini. Many have interesting behavior (e.g. mouthbrooding in Astatotilapia burtoni or the "sleeper" ambushes of Nimbochromis), and brilliant colors are also widespread. Males and females are often strikingly sexually dichromatic. In the aquarium hobby, these fishes are popular; however due to their often aggressive behaviors and rather unusual water parameters, they are generally unsuitable for beginners or community tanks. There are some informal names used among aquarists for Haplochromini. Generally, any and all (as well as some similar-looking Pseudocrenilabrinae) may be referred to haplos, haps or happies. More specific terms are mbuna ("rock-dwelling browser") and utaka ("free-roaming hunter"), which are Bantu terms for these two ecological groups.

Haplochromines inhabit both rivers and lakes, but it is the lake species that have been most closely studied because of the species flocks known from some of the larger lakes, such as Lake Malawi. In the aquarium hobby, the "happies" are conveniently divided into four groups:

- Riverine species and those endemic to the northern Great Lakes such as Lake Kivu and Lake Victoria
- Mbuna, endemic to Lake Malawi
- Utaka and other non-mbuna species endemic to Lake Malawi
- Species endemic to Lake Tanganyika

Lake Victoria's trophic web was thoroughly upset in the second half of the 20th century, after Nile Perch (Lates niloticus) were introduced to the lake. Among the haplochromines found there, there have been many extinctions, and a number of other species only survive in aquaria. One monotypic genus, Hoplotilapia, is believed to be entirely extinct at least in the wild.

== Genera ==
As numerous Haplochromini, in particular those species still placed in the "wastebin genus" Haplochromis, are of unclear relationships, the number and validity of genera in this tribe is subject to change. Hybrid introgression is seriously hampering molecular phylogenetic studies of this group.

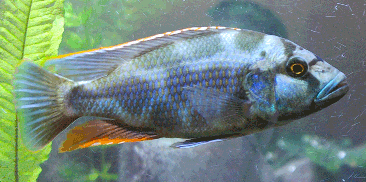
Male Livingston's cichlid (Nimbochromis livingstoni)

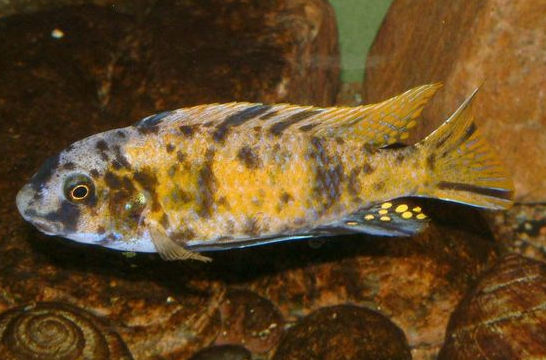
Male blue mbuna (Labeotropheus fuelleborni) of the blotched morph

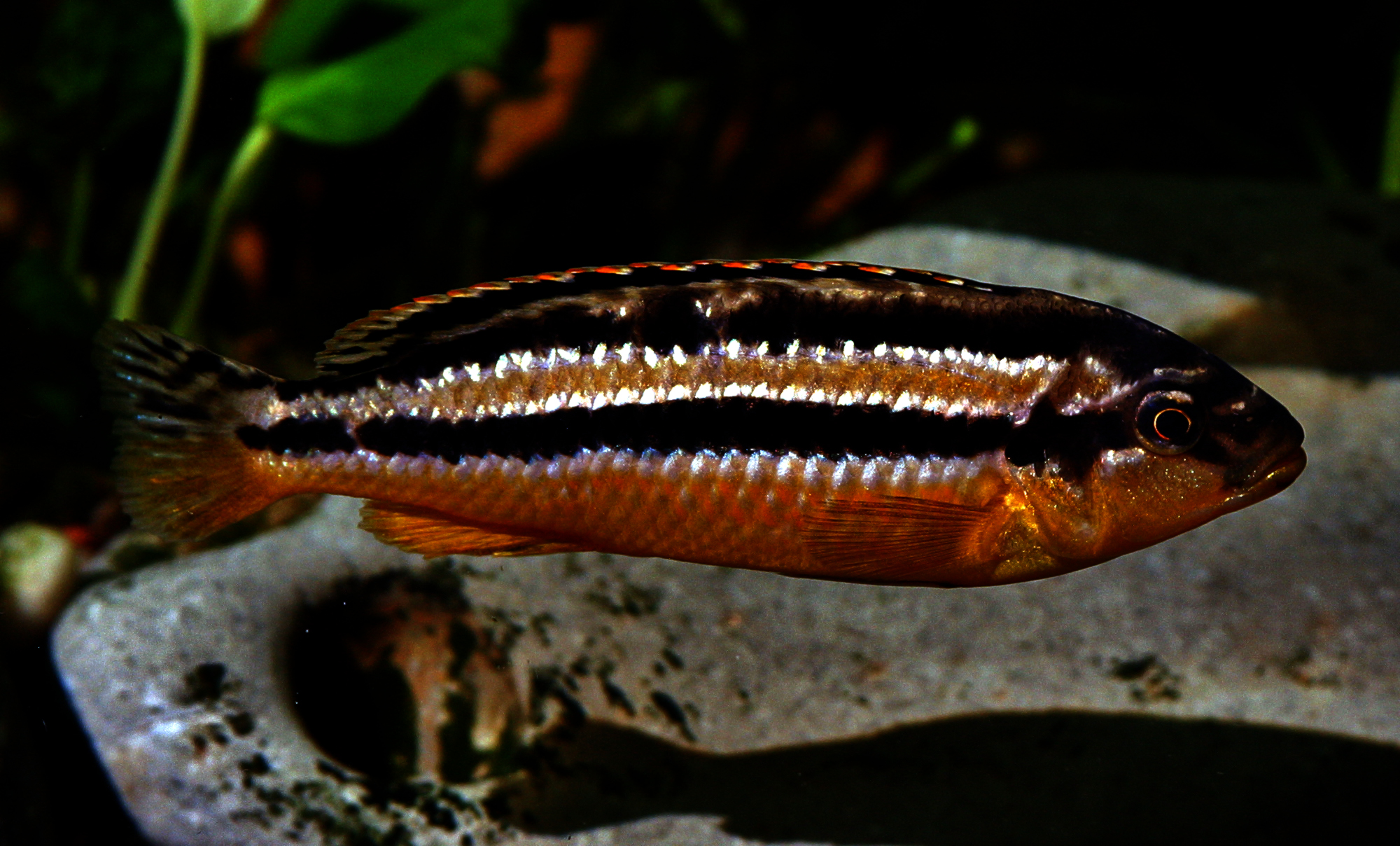
Female golden mbuna (Melanochromis auratus)
- Abactochromis
- Alticorpus
- Aristochromis
- Astatoreochromis
- Astatotilapia
- Aulonocara
- Buccochromis
- Caprichromis
- Champsochromis
- Cheilochromis
- Chetia
- Chilotilapia
- Copadichromis
- Corematodus
- Ctenochromis
- Ctenopharynx
- Cyathochromis
- Cyclopharynx
- Cynotilapia
- Cyrtocara
- Dimidiochromis
- Diplotaxodon
- Docimodus
- Eclectochromis
- Exochochromis
- Fossorochromis
- Genyochromis
- Gephyrochromis
- Haplochromis
- Hemitaeniochromis
- Hemitilapia
- Iodotropheus
- Konia
- Labeotropheus
- Labidochromis
- Lethrinops
- Lichnochromis
- Maylandia/Metriaclima
- Mbipia
- Mchenga
- Melanochromis
- Microchromis
- Mylochromis
- Naevochromis
- Neochromis
- Nimbochromis
- Nyassachromis
- Orthochromis
- Otopharynx
- Pallidochromis
- Petrotilapia
- Pharyngochromis
- Placidochromis
- Protomelas
- Pseudocrenilabrus
- Pseudotropheus
- Pundamilia
- Pungu
- Pyxichromis
- Rhamphochromis
- Sargochromis
- Sciaenochromis
- Schwetzochromis
- Serranochromis
- Stigmatochromis
- Taeniochromis
- Taeniolethrinops
- Thoracochromis
- Tramitichromis
- Trematocranus
- Trematochromis
- Tropheops
- Tyrannochromis

Two rather singular cichlids are also placed in the Haplochromini on occasion. These are the monotypic genera Etia and Myaka. But more usually, the former is considered incertae sedis among the Pseudocrenilabrinae, while the latter is placed in the Tilapiini.

== General and cited references ==
- International Union for the Conservation of Nature and Natural Resources (IUCN) (2009): 2009 IUCN Red List of Threatened Species. Version 2009.1. Retrieved 2009-SEP-20.
- Kishe-Machumu, Mary; Witte, Frans & Wanink, Jan H. (2008): Dietary shift in benthivorous cichlids after the ecological changes in Lake Victoria. Anim. Biol. 58(4): 401-417. doi:10.1163/157075608X383700 (HTML abstract)
- Loiselle Paul V. (1994): The Cichlid Aquarium (Expanded ed.). Voyageur Press. ISBN 1-56465-146-0.
- Nagl, Sandra; Tichy, Herbert; Mayer, Werner E.; Samonte, Irene E.; McAndrew, Brendan J. & Klein, Jan (2001): Classification and Phylogenetic Relationships of African Tilapiine Fishes Inferred from Mitochondrial DNA Sequences. Molecular Phylogenetics and Evolution 20(3): 361–374. doi:10.1006/mpev.2001.0979.
