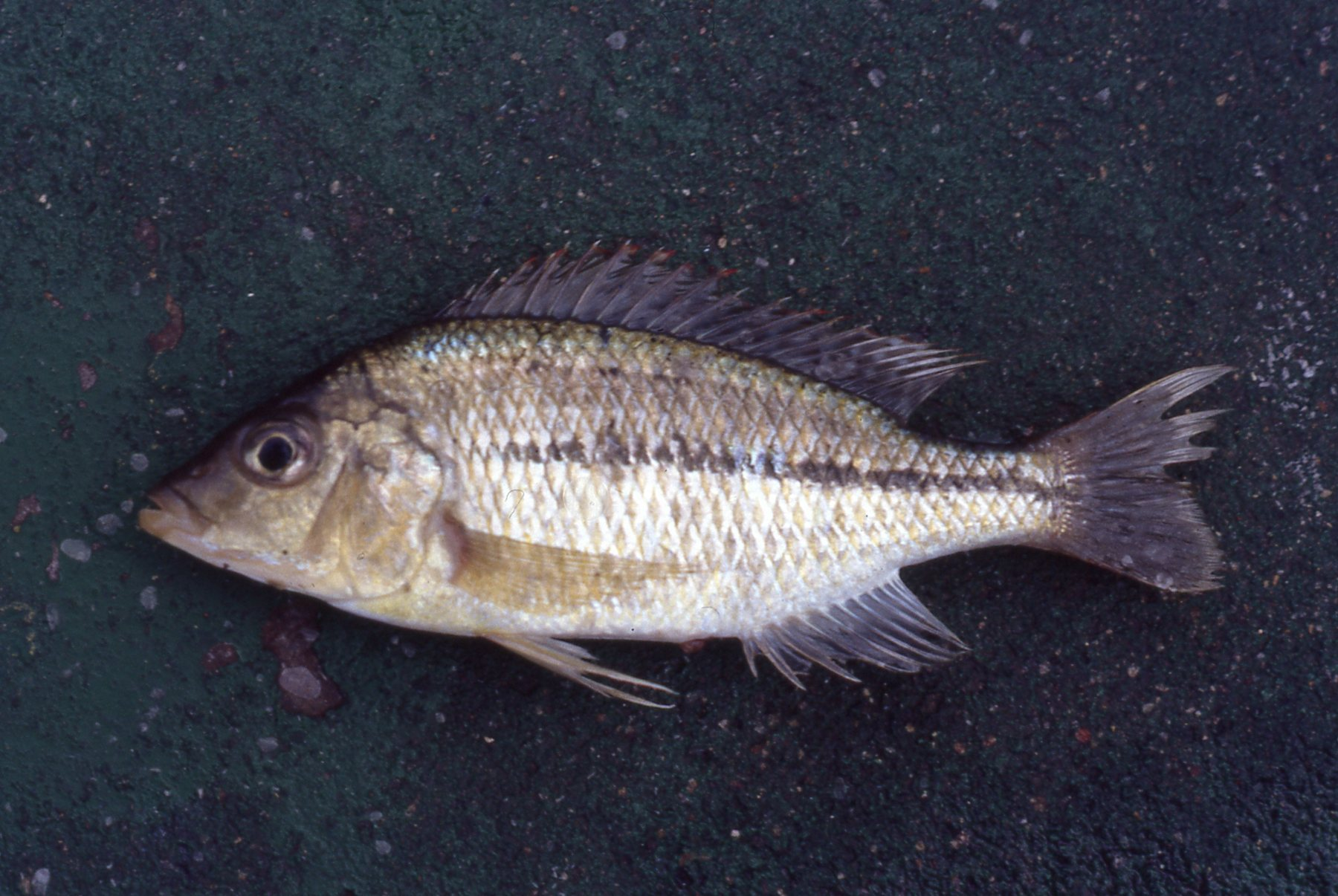
- Protomelas kirkii, female, freshly caught by beach seine in Monkey Bay, Lake Malawi in 1992

Conservation status
- Least Concern (IUCN 3.1)

Scientific classification
- Kingdom: Animalia
- Phylum: Chordata
- Class: Actinopterygii
- Order: Cichliformes
- Family: Cichlidae
- Genus: Protomelas
- Species: P. kirkii

Binomial name
- Protomelas kirkii (Günther, 1894)

Synonyms
- Chromis kirkii Günther, 1894; Ctenochromis kirkii (Günther, 1894); Cyrtocara kirkii (Günther, 1894); Haplochromis kirkii (Günther, 1894); Tilapia kirkii (Günther, 1894)

= Protomelas kirkii =

Species of fish

Protomelas kirkii is a species of cichlid endemic to Lake Malawi, where it is most commonly found in areas vegetated with Vallisneria. This species can reach a length of 18 centimetres (7.1 in) TL. It can also be found in the aquarium trade.

== Description ==
This cichlid fish is relatively deep-bodied, with a small mouth and a yellow-brown colour with an obvious horizontal flank stripe. It often lives together with the similar-looking Protomelas similis and P. labridens. Protomelas kirkii can be distinguished by its longer snout and small terminal (forward-facing) mouth. Females and immatures are countershaded, yellowish-brown on the upper surface, and paler on the flanks and underside. There is a strong dark horizontal stripe along the midline, and sometimes a thinner dark band about half-way between the midline band and the base of the dorsal fin. There are often dark blotches along the base of the dorsal fin. Faint dark vertical bars can sometimes be seen on the flanks. The tip of the dorsal fin is edged in red. Mature males, which are generally much larger than adult females, are bright metallic blue-green with numerous orange-red spots on the dorsal and caudal (tail) fins. The anal fin is dark reddish with numerous yellow-white spots and streaks. The male also has reddish edges on many of the scales behind the head.

== Systematics ==
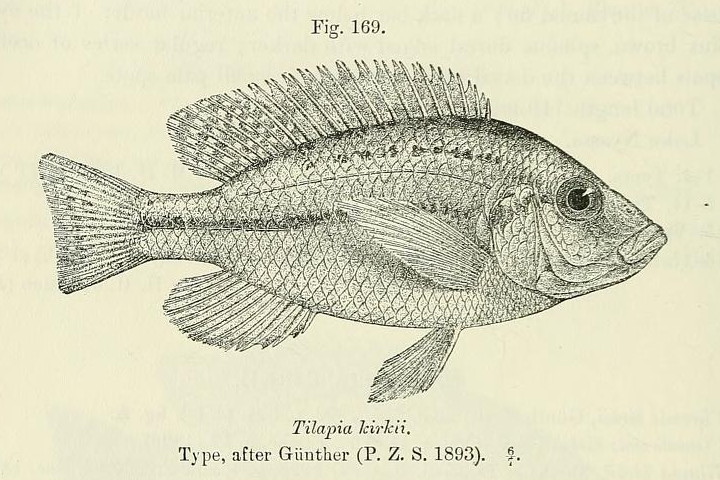
Protomelas kirkii: illustration from the Catalogue of the fresh-water fishes of Africa in the British Museum, 1915 as Tilapia kirkii

The species was described as Chromis kirkii in 1894 by Albert Günther at the Natural History Museum in London, from specimens sent by Sir Harry Johnston, then colonial governor of British Central Africa. The reason for the species name is not given, but Günther mentions receiving a previous set of zoological specimens from Sir John Kirk, who accompanied David Livingstone on some of his explorations of the area, so the specific name was a dedication to Kirk. The genus Chromis is now used for marine fishes of the family Pomacentridae, and C. kirkii was moved around various genera, most notably residing in the genus Haplochromis from the 1920s to 1980s. In 1989, David Eccles and Ethelwynn Trewavas designated C. kirkii as the type species for their new genus Protomelas, which then contained some 14 endemic Lake Malawi cichlid fish species united by a shared body pattern (in females and immatures) comprising both horizontal and vertical dark markings. It has been informally proposed that the genus Eclectochromis should be combined with Protomelas.

== Distribution ==
The species is endemic to Lake Malawi and its catchment. It is found throughout the lake in suitable habitats, and penetrates into rivers, being found downstream in the Shire River as far as the Kapachira Falls and in Lake Malombe.

== Behaviour & ecology ==
Protomelas kirkii is confined to shallow, weedy parts of the lake and associated rivers. They are reported to feed on small invertebrates collected from the lake bottom. The species is a typical maternal mouthbrooder. Males build a small mound of sediment, often in an area cleared of weeds in shallow water (less than 2m deep). They defend their territories and try to attract females to spawn with them. Females collect the eggs in their mouths and release the free-swimming young after a few weeks.

== Exploitation & conservation ==
The species is caught as a food fish using beach seines in shallow waters around the lake. In Malawi, it is generally known as 'Kambuzi', although this term is often applied to other small fishes caught in shallow water. It is also occasionally traded as an aquarium fish. It is said to be robust in captivity, although it requires alkaline water (pH 7–8.5). Males are said to be permanently territorial and so no more than one should be kept in a standard home aquarium.

It is presently rated 'least concern' in the IUCN Red List.
