= Protomelas dejunctus =

Fire blue hap

Conservation status
- Vulnerable (IUCN 3.1)

Scientific classification
- Kingdom: Animalia
- Phylum: Chordata
- Class: Actinopterygii
- Order: Cichliformes
- Family: Cichlidae
- Genus: Protomelas
- Species: P. dejunctus

Binomial name
- Protomelas dejunctus Stauffer, 1993

Species of fish

Protomelas dejunctus, the fire blue hap, is a species of cichlid endemic to Lake Malawi where it is only known from around Chinyankwazi Island and Chinyamwezi Island in the southern portion of the lake. It is known from depths of from 2 to 10 metres (6.6 to 32.8 ft). This species can reach a length of 13.8 centimetres (5.4 in) SL. Some authorities have revised this taxon's status to that of a subspecies of Protomelas taeniolatus.
