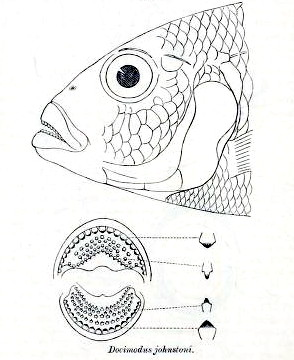
- Docimodus johnstoni

Scientific classification
- Kingdom: Animalia
- Phylum: Chordata
- Class: Actinopterygii
- Division: Teleostei
- Order: Cichliformes
- Family: Cichlidae
- Tribe: Haplochromini
- Genus: Docimodus; Boulenger, 1897

Type species
- Docimodus johnstoni Boulenger, 1897

= Docimodus =

Genus of fishes

Docimodus is a small genus of cichlids native to east Africa where they are found in Lake Malawi, though one species, (D. johnstoni) also occurs in Lake Malombe and the upper portion of the Shire River.

The species of this genus have unusual feeding habits: they feed on scales, fins, or skin of other fishes.

== Species ==
There are currently two recognized species in this genus:

- Docimodus evelynae Eccles & D. S. C. Lewis, 1976
- Docimodus johnstoni Boulenger, 1897
