= P. insignis =

P. insignis may refer to:

- Pachylemur insignis, an extinct lemur speciesonly known from subfossil remains found at sites in central and southwestern Madagascar
- Panterpe insignis, the fiery-throated hummingbird, a medium-sized hummingbird species found in Costa Rica and western Panama
- Patelloida insignis, a sea snail species
- Philonectria insignis, a fungus species
- Platonia insignis, a plant species found in South America
- Ploceus insignis, the brown-capped weaver, a bird species found in Africa
- Polihierax insignis, the white-rumped falcon or white-rumped Pygmy-falcon, a bird of prey species found in Cambodia, Laos, Myanmar, Thailand and Vietnam
- Pothos insignis, flowering plant species in the genus Pothos
- Protomelas insignis, the one-and-a-half-stripe hap, a fish species found in Malawi, Mozambique and Tanzania
- Pselliophora insignis, a crane fly species in the genus Pselliophora

== Synonyms ==
- Pimelodus insignis, a synonym for Pinirampus pirinampu, the flatwhiskered catfish, a catfish species found in Brazil
- Pseudophoenix insignis, a synonym for Pseudophoenix vinifera, a palm species
