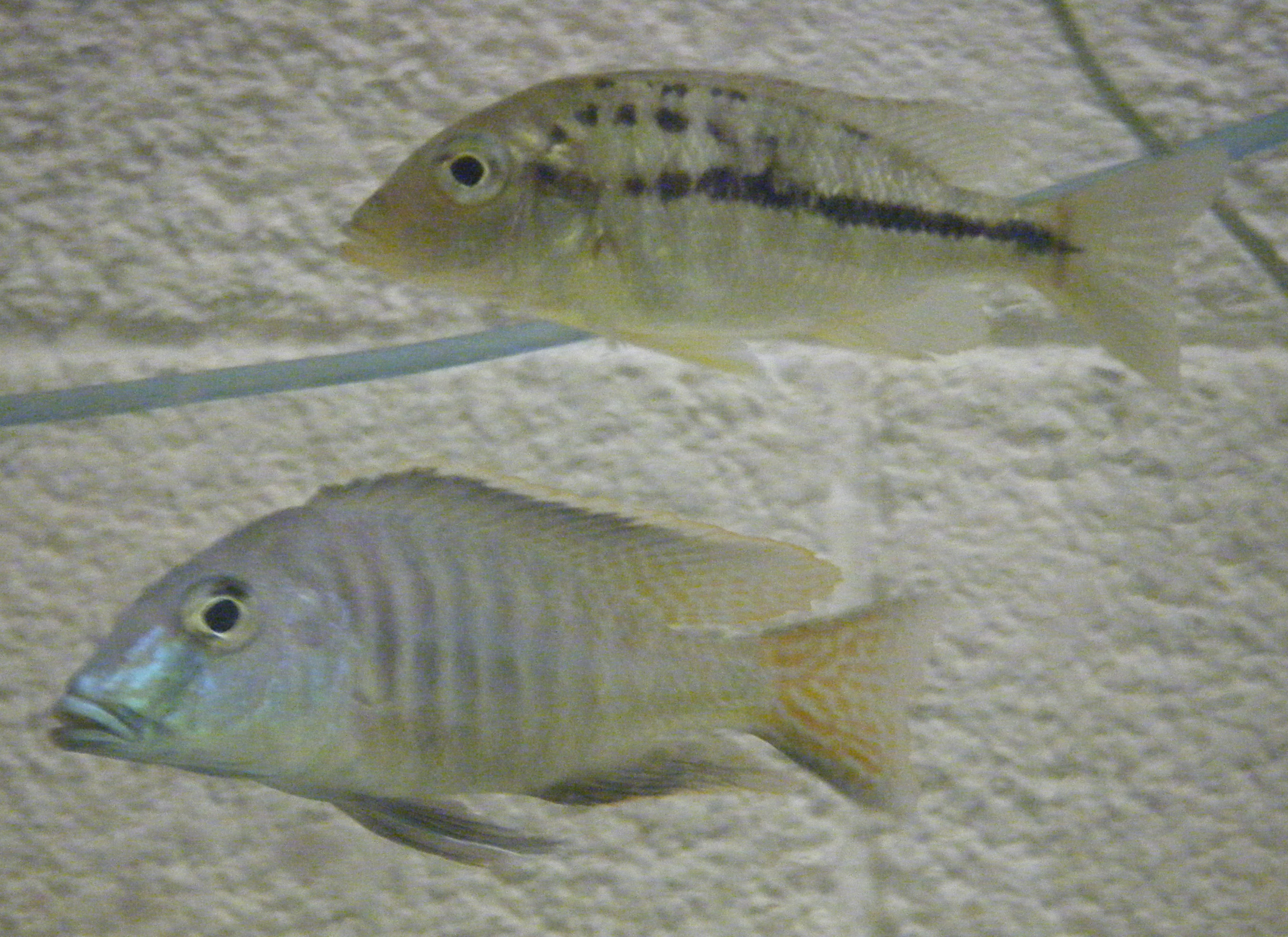
- Lethrinops lethrinus

Scientific classification
- Kingdom: Animalia
- Phylum: Chordata
- Class: Actinopterygii
- Division: Teleostei
- Order: Cichliformes
- Family: Cichlidae
- Tribe: Haplochromini
- Genus: Lethrinops; Regan, 1922

Type species
- Chromis lethrinus Günther, 1894

= Lethrinops =

Genus of fishes

Lethrinops is a genus of haplochromine cichlids endemic to Lake Malawi in East Africa. Particularly in the aquarium hobby, they are known as the sandeaters or sandsifters. Cichlid fishes of the Lethrinops genus have been studied in biology and ichthyology, primarily due to their radiated speciation and rapid evolution in their native habitat of Malawi. In biology, the speciation seen in these fish is known as explosive speciation. Numerous environmental pressures, such as overfishing, invasive species, and pollution threaten species of the Lethrinops genus. Malawi has established a national park to protect the cichlid species within the lakes.

== Species ==
There are currently 25 recognized species in this genus:

- Lethrinops albus Regan, 1922
- Lethrinops altus Trewavas, 1931
- Lethrinops argenteus C. G. E. Ahl, 1926
- Lethrinops atrilabris G. F. Turner. 2022
- Lethrinops auritus (Regan, 1922) (golden sand-eater)
- Lethrinops chilingali Turner, Crampton & Genner, 2023
- Lethrinops christyi Trewavas, 1931
- Lethrinops furcifer Trewavas, 1931 (greenface sandsifter)
- Lethrinops gossei W. E. Burgess & H. R. Axelrod, 1973
- Lethrinops leptodon Regan, 1922
- Lethrinops lethrinus (Günther, 1894)
- Lethrinops longimanus Trewavas, 1931
- Lethrinops longipinnis Eccles & D. S. C. Lewis, 1978
- Lethrinops lunaris Trewavas, 1931
- Lethrinops macracanthus Trewavas, 1931
- Lethrinops macrochir (Regan, 1922)
- Lethrinops macrophthalmus (Boulenger, 1908)
- Lethrinops marginatus C. G. E. Ahl, 1926 (Lethrinops rounded head)
- Lethrinops micrentodon (Regan, 1922)
- Lethrinops microdon Eccles & D. S. C. Lewis, 1977
- Lethrinops microstoma Trewavas, 1931 (littletooth sandeater)
- Lethrinops mylodon Eccles & D. S. C. Lewis, 1979
- Lethrinops parvidens Trewavas, 1931 (Lethrinops red flush)
- Lethrinops stridei Eccles & D. S. C. Lewis, 1977
- Lethrinops turneri Ngatunga & Snoeks, 2003

Synonyms

- Lethrinops oculatus Trewavas, 1931; valid as L. marginatus

== See also ==
- Eartheaters, a group of South American cichlids with a similar niche
