= Utaka (disambiguation) =

Utaka is a fish.

Utaka may also refer to:

== People ==
- John Utaka (born 1982), Nigerian footballer
- Peter Utaka (born 1984), Nigerian footballer

== Other uses ==
- Small green utaka, fish
