= Lethrinops oculatus =

Conservation status
- Vulnerable (IUCN 3.1)

Scientific classification
- Kingdom: Animalia
- Phylum: Chordata
- Class: Actinopterygii
- Order: Cichliformes
- Family: Cichlidae
- Genus: Lethrinops
- Species: L. oculatus

Binomial name
- Lethrinops oculatus Trewavas,1931

Species of fish

Lethrinops oculatus is a species of cichlid endemic to Lake Malawi where it is only known from the southern part of the lake over sandy substrates. This species grows to a length of 13.5 centimetres (5.3 in) TL. It can also be found in the aquarium trade. The 2018 version of The IUCN Red List of Threatened Species treats this taxon as a junior synonyms of Lethrinops marginatus, as does the Catalog of Fishes.
