= L. albus =

L. albus may refer to:

- Lethrinops albus, a fish species endemic to Lake Malawi
- Loxechinus albus, a sea urchin species found in Chile
- Luciogobius albus, a fish species
- Lupinus albus, a traditional white lupin pulse species cultivated in the Mediterranean region

== See also ==
- Albus (disambiguation)
