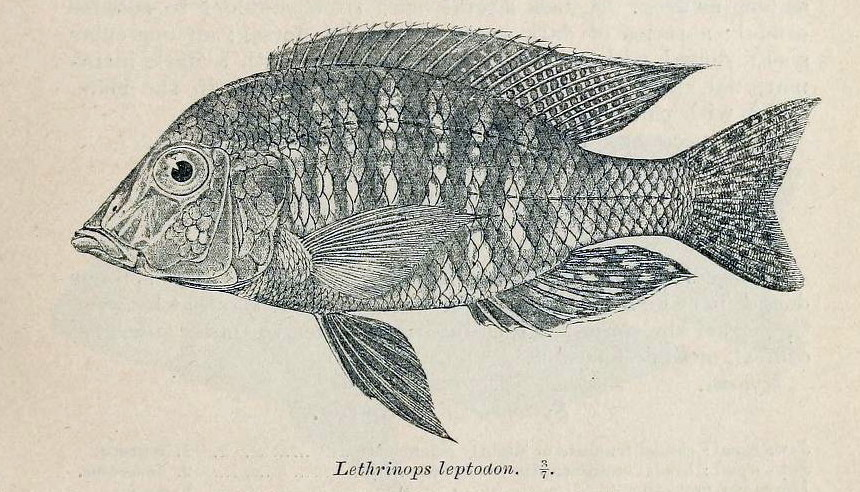

Conservation status
- Least Concern (IUCN 3.1)

Scientific classification
- Kingdom: Animalia
- Phylum: Chordata
- Class: Actinopterygii
- Order: Cichliformes
- Family: Cichlidae
- Genus: Lethrinops
- Species: L. leptodon

Binomial name
- Lethrinops leptodon Regan, 1922

= Lethrinops leptodon =

Species of fish

Lethrinops leptodon is a species of cichlid endemic to Lake Malawi where it prefers areas with sandy substrates. This species grows to a length of 20 centimetres (7.9 in) TL. It can also be found in the aquarium trade.
