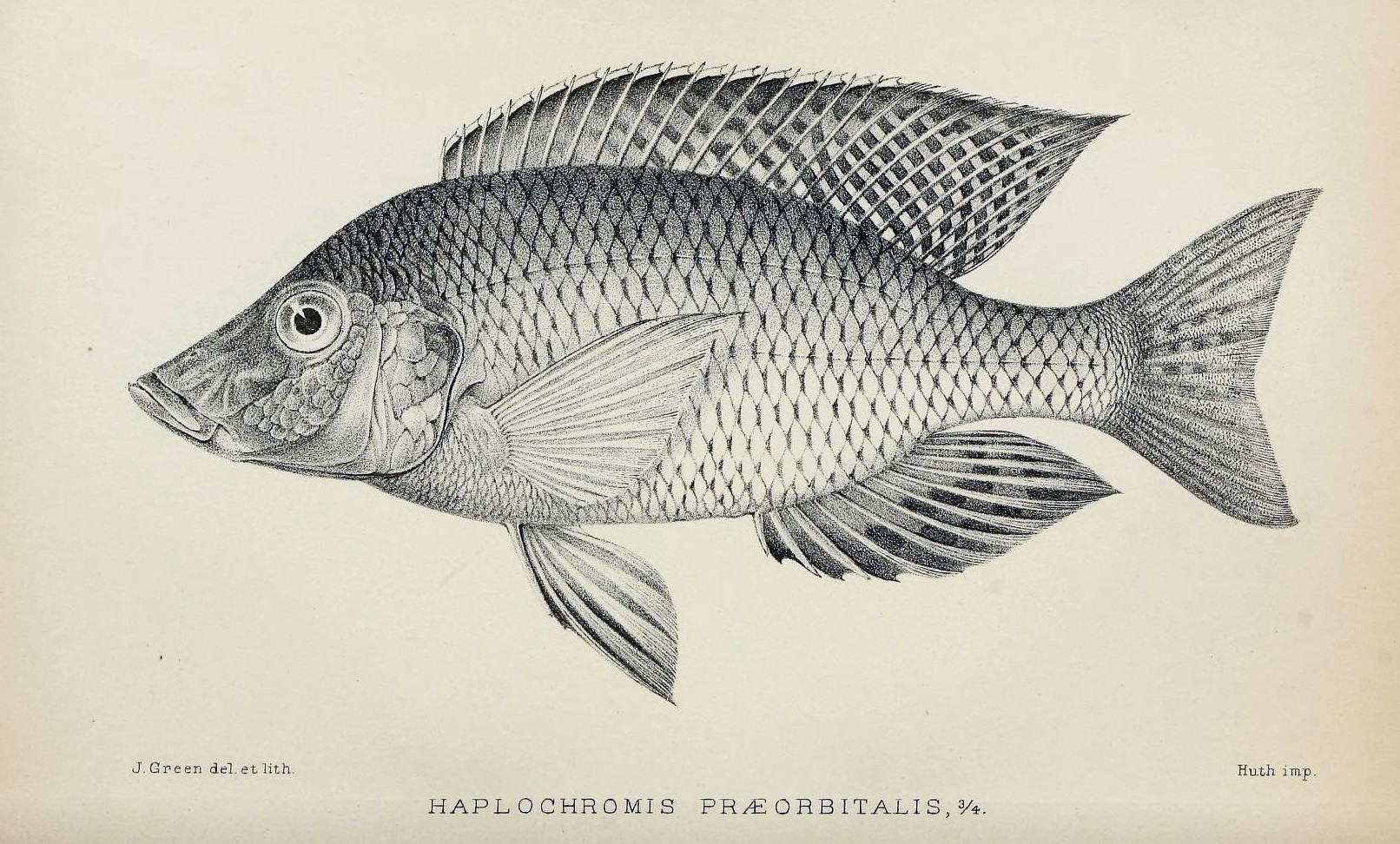

Conservation status
- Least Concern (IUCN 3.1)

Scientific classification
- Kingdom: Animalia
- Phylum: Chordata
- Class: Actinopterygii
- Order: Cichliformes
- Family: Cichlidae
- Genus: Taeniolethrinops
- Species: T. praeorbitalis

Binomial name
- Taeniolethrinops praeorbitalis (Regan, 1922)

Synonyms
- Haplochromis praeorbitalis Regan, 1922; Lethrinops praeorbitalis (Regan, 1922); Lethrinops macrorhynchus Regan, 1922; Lethrinops fasciatus C. G. E. Ahl, 1926

= Taeniolethrinops praeorbitalis =

Species of fish

Taeniolethrinops praeorbitalis is a species of cichlid endemic to Lake Malawi where it prefers shallow waters with sandy substrates but can occur as deep as approximately 50 metres (160 ft). This species can reach a length of 30 centimetres (12 in) TL. It can also be found in the aquarium trade.
