= Lethrinops longimanus =

Conservation status
- Least Concern (IUCN 3.1)

Scientific classification
- Kingdom: Animalia
- Phylum: Chordata
- Class: Actinopterygii
- Order: Cichliformes
- Family: Cichlidae
- Genus: Lethrinops
- Species: L. longimanus

Binomial name
- Lethrinops longimanus Trewavas, 1931

Species of fish

Lethrinops longimanus is a species of cichlid endemic to Lake Malawi where it is found in deep waters 50 to 70 metres (160 to 230 ft) over sandy substrates. This species grows to a length of 15.3 centimetres (6.0 in) SL.
