= Protomelas triaenodon =

Conservation status
- Least Concern (IUCN 3.1)

Scientific classification
- Kingdom: Animalia
- Phylum: Chordata
- Class: Actinopterygii
- Order: Cichliformes
- Family: Cichlidae
- Genus: Protomelas
- Species: P. triaenodon

Binomial name
- Protomelas triaenodon (Trewavas, 1935)

Synonyms
- Haplochromis triaenodon Trewavas, 1935; Cyrtocara triaenodon (Trewavas, 1935)

Species of fish

Protomelas triaenodon is a species of cichlid native to the southern portion of Lake Malawi, Lake Malombe and the Shire River. This species can reach a length of 15.4 centimetres (6.1 in) TL. It can also be found in the aquarium trade.
