= Lethrinops stridei =

Conservation status
- Data Deficient (IUCN 3.1)

Scientific classification
- Kingdom: Animalia
- Phylum: Chordata
- Class: Actinopterygii
- Order: Cichliformes
- Family: Cichlidae
- Genus: Lethrinops
- Species: L. stridei

Binomial name
- Lethrinops stridei Eccles & D. S. C. Lewis, 1977

Species of fish

Lethrinops stridei is a species of cichlid endemic to Lake Malawi, where it occurs at depths from 15 to 55 metres (49 to 180 ft) in areas with sandy substrates. This species grows to 13 centimetres (5.1 in) SL. The specific name honours Kenneth E. Stride, who introduced successful commercial trawling to Lake Malawi. This species is now very rare in Lake Malawi and is threatened by overfishing by commercial trawlers.
