= Greenface sandsifter =

Conservation status
- Least Concern (IUCN 3.1)

Scientific classification
- Kingdom: Animalia
- Phylum: Chordata
- Class: Actinopterygii
- Order: Cichliformes
- Family: Cichlidae
- Genus: Lethrinops
- Species: L. furcifer

Binomial name
- Lethrinops furcifer Trewavas, 1931

Species of fish

The greenface sandsifter (Lethrinops furcifer) is a species of cichlid endemic to Lake Malawi where it prefers areas with sandy substrates. This species grows to a length of 19.5 centimetres (7.7 in) TL. It can also be found in the aquarium trade.
