= Cheilochromis =

Malawi thicklip

Conservation status
- Least Concern (IUCN 3.1)

Scientific classification
- Kingdom: Animalia
- Phylum: Chordata
- Class: Actinopterygii
- Order: Cichliformes
- Family: Cichlidae
- Tribe: Haplochromini
- Genus: Cheilochromis; Eccles & Trewavas, 1989
- Species: C. euchilus

Binomial name
- Cheilochromis euchilus (Trewavas, 1935)

Synonyms
- Haplochromis euchilus Trewavas, 1935; Chilotilapia euchilus (Trewavas, 1935); Cyrtocara euchila (Trewavas, 1935); Cyrtocara euchilus (Trewavas, 1935); Pseudohaplochromis euchilus (Trewavas, 1935)

Genus of fishes

Cheilochromis is a genus of freshwater fish in the cichlid family. It contains the sole species Cheilochromis euchilus, the Malawi thicklip, which is endemic to Lake Malawi in East Africa where it prefers near-shore areas with rocky bottoms. This species reaches a length of 35 centimetres (14 in) TL. It can also be found in the aquarium trade.

The specific epithet euchilus refers to lips being divided into median lobes.
