= Tramitichromis intermedius =

Conservation status
- Least Concern (IUCN 3.1)

Scientific classification
- Kingdom: Animalia
- Phylum: Chordata
- Class: Actinopterygii
- Order: Cichliformes
- Family: Cichlidae
- Genus: Tramitichromis
- Species: T. intermedius

Binomial name
- Tramitichromis intermedius (Trewavas, 1935)

Synonyms
- Lethrinops intermedia Trewavas, 1935; Trematocranus intermedius (Trewavas, 1935)

Species of fish

Tramitichromis intermedius is a species of cichlid endemic to Lake Malawi where it is found in the southern parts of the lake preferring the shallows of sheltered bays. It can reach a length of 16 centimetres (6.3 in) TL. It can also be found in the aquarium trade.
