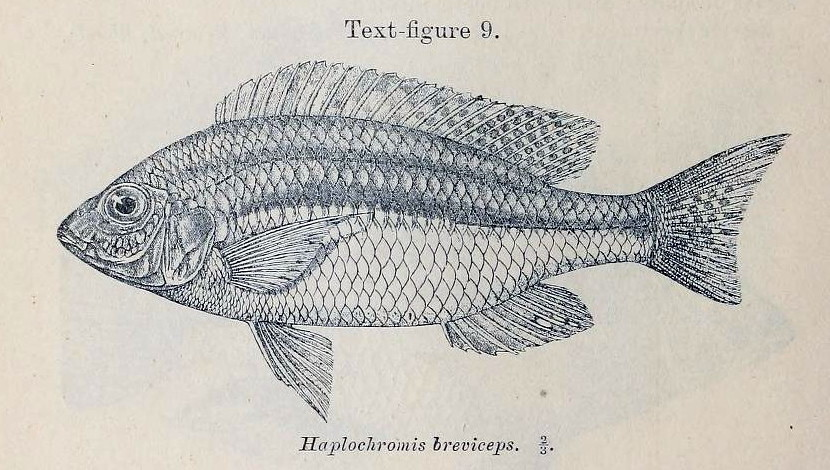
- Nyassachromis breviceps

Scientific classification
- Kingdom: Animalia
- Phylum: Chordata
- Class: Actinopterygii
- Order: Cichliformes
- Family: Cichlidae
- Subfamily: Pseudocrenilabrinae
- Tribe: Haplochromini
- Genus: Nyassachromis; Eccles & Trewavas, 1989

Type species
- Haplochromis breviceps Regan, 1922

= Nyassachromis =

Genus of fishes

Nyassachromis is a genus of haplochromine cichlids endemic to Lake Malawi. They are open-water mouthbrooders, an ecological niche known as utaka to locals.

== Species ==
There are currently eight recognized species in this genus:

- Nyassachromis boadzulu (Iles, 1960)
- Nyassachromis breviceps (Regan, 1922)
- Nyassachromis leuciscus (Regan, 1922) (Small Green Utaka)
- Nyassachromis microcephalus (Trewavas, 1935)
- Nyassachromis nigritaeniatus (Trewavas, 1935)
- Nyassachromis prostoma (Trewavas, 1935)
- Nyassachromis purpurans (Trewavas, 1935)
- Nyassachromis serenus (Trewavas, 1935)
