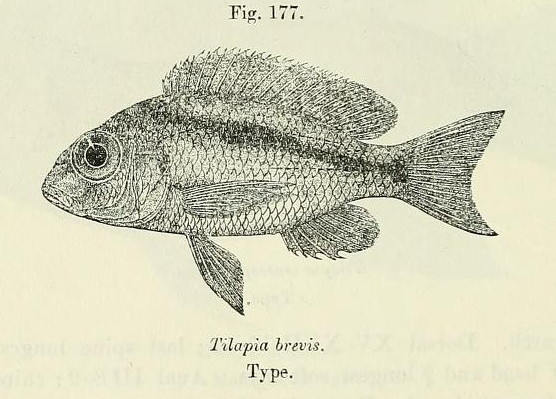
- Tramitichromis brevis

Scientific classification
- Kingdom: Animalia
- Phylum: Chordata
- Class: Actinopterygii
- Order: Cichliformes
- Family: Cichlidae
- Tribe: Haplochromini
- Genus: Tramitichromis; Eccles & Trewavas, 1989

Type species
- Tilapia brevis Boulenger, 1908

= Tramitichromis =

Genus of fishes

Tramitichromis is a small genus of haplochromine cichlids endemic to Lake Malawi.

== Species ==
There are currently five recognized species in this genus:

- Tramitichromis brevis (Boulenger, 1908)
- Tramitichromis intermedius (Trewavas, 1935)
- Tramitichromis lituris (Trewavas, 1931)
- Tramitichromis trilineatus (Trewavas, 1931)
- Tramitichromis variabilis (Trewavas, 1931)
