= Taeniolethrinops furcicauda =

Conservation status
- Least Concern (IUCN 3.1)

Scientific classification
- Kingdom: Animalia
- Phylum: Chordata
- Class: Actinopterygii
- Order: Cichliformes
- Family: Cichlidae
- Genus: Taeniolethrinops
- Species: T. furcicauda

Binomial name
- Taeniolethrinops furcicauda (Trewavas, 1931)

Synonyms
- Lethrinops furcicauda Trewavas, 1931

Species of fish

Taeniolethrinops furcicauda is a species of cichlid endemic to Lake Malawi where it occurs at depths of from 5 to 40 metres (16 to 131 ft) over sandy substrates. This species can reach a length of 21 centimetres (8.3 in) TL. It can also be found in the aquarium trade.
