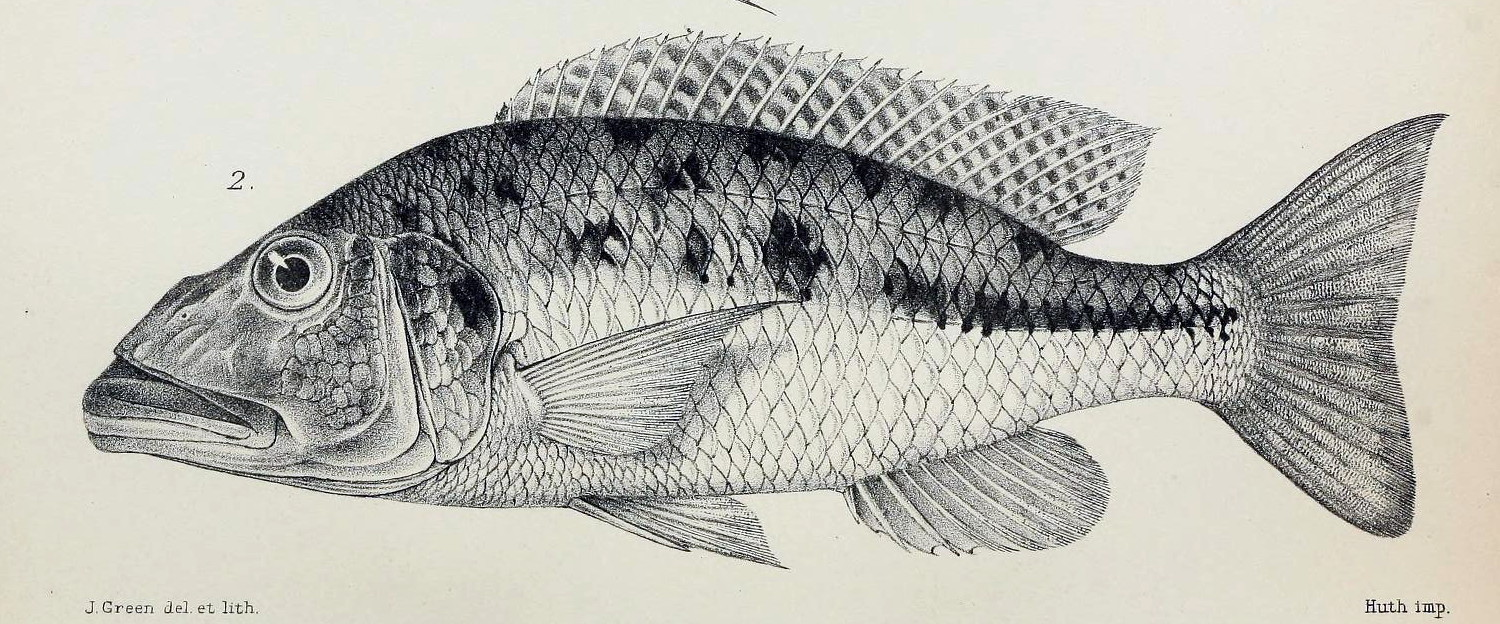
- Tyrannochromis macrostoma

Scientific classification
- Kingdom: Animalia
- Phylum: Chordata
- Class: Actinopterygii
- Order: Cichliformes
- Family: Cichlidae
- Tribe: Haplochromini
- Genus: Tyrannochromis; Eccles & Trewavas, 1989

Type species
- Haplochromis macrostoma Regan, 1922

= Tyrannochromis =

Genus of fishes

Tyrannochromis is a small genus of haplochromine cichlids endemic to Lake Malawi.

== Species ==
There are currently four recognized species in this genus:

- Tyrannochromis macrostoma (Regan, 1922)
- Tyrannochromis maculiceps (C. G. E. Ahl, 1926)
- Tyrannochromis nigriventer Eccles, 1989
- Tyrannochromis polyodon (Trewavas, 1935)
