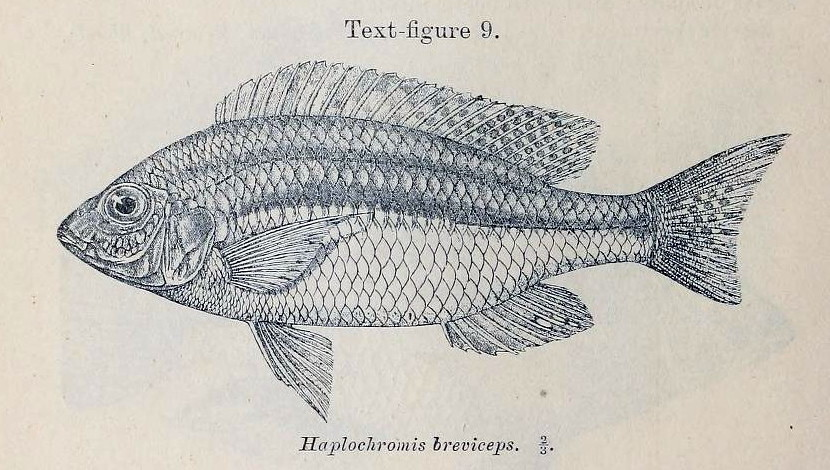

Conservation status
- Critically endangered, possibly extinct (IUCN 3.1)

Scientific classification
- Kingdom: Animalia
- Phylum: Chordata
- Class: Actinopterygii
- Order: Cichliformes
- Family: Cichlidae
- Genus: Nyassachromis
- Species: N. breviceps

Binomial name
- Nyassachromis breviceps (Regan, 1922)

Synonyms
- Haplochromis breviceps Regan, 1922; Cyrtocara breviceps (Regan, 1922)

= Nyassachromis breviceps =

Species of fish

Nyassachromis breviceps is a species of cichlid that is endemic to Lake Malawi, where it is only found in the southern part of the lake. It prefers areas with sandy substrates but needs a supply of small pebbles for nest building. This species can reach a length of 15.4 centimetres (6.1 in) in total length. This species was last observed in Lake Malawi in 1997 and is thought that it may be extinct, caused by overexploitation by artisanal fishermen.

== Taxonomy ==
Nyassachromis breviceps was first described by Charles Tate Regan in 1922. It is classified in the family Cichlidae (cichlids) in the class Actinopterygii. The species has been referred to by the synonyms Cyrtocara breviceps and Haplochromis breviceps.

== Distribution ==
N. breviceps is endemic to the southern portion of Lake Malawi. If it is still extant, it would have an extremely small remaining area of occupancy of 4km^{2}.

== Ecology ==
N. breviceps prefers sandy habitats, though males also require small stones for the nests they build. The males dig a cave beside a rock to form their spawning site. Its breeding season is August to December.

This species feeds on phytoplankton. The females form schools in open water. The fish occurs in depths up to 16 metres.

The fish grows to a maximum of 14.0 to 15.4 cm.

N. breviceps is assessed as a critically endangered species and possibly extinct on the IUCN Red List. The species faced a steep population decline as a result of overfishing; no individuals have been collected since 1997, and a breeding group was last seen in 1988.
