= Nyassachromis prostoma =

Conservation status
- Least Concern (IUCN 3.1)

Scientific classification
- Kingdom: Animalia
- Phylum: Chordata
- Class: Actinopterygii
- Order: Cichliformes
- Family: Cichlidae
- Genus: Nyassachromis
- Species: N. prostoma

Binomial name
- Nyassachromis prostoma (Trewavas, 1935)

Synonyms
- Haplochromis prostoma Trewavas, 1935; Copadichromis prostoma (Trewavas, 1935); Cyrtocara prostoma (Trewavas, 1935)

Species of fish

Nyassachromis prostoma is a species of fish in the family Cichlidae. It is endemic to Lake Malawi and found in Malawi and Tanzania.
