= Lethrinops lunaris =

Conservation status
- Least Concern (IUCN 3.1)

Scientific classification
- Kingdom: Animalia
- Phylum: Chordata
- Class: Actinopterygii
- Order: Cichliformes
- Family: Cichlidae
- Genus: Lethrinops
- Species: L. lunaris

Binomial name
- Lethrinops lunaris Trewavas, 1931

Species of fish

Lethrinops lunaris is a species of cichlid endemic to Lake Malawi where it occurs in shallow waters with sandy substrates. This species grows to a length of 18.6 centimetres (7.3 in) TL. It can also be found in the aquarium trade.
