= Protomelas macrodon =

Conservation status
- Data Deficient (IUCN 3.1)

Scientific classification
- Kingdom: Animalia
- Phylum: Chordata
- Class: Actinopterygii
- Order: Cichliformes
- Family: Cichlidae
- Genus: Protomelas
- Species: P. macrodon

Binomial name
- Protomelas macrodon Eccles, 1989

Species of fish

Protomelas macrodon is a species of cichlid endemic to Lake Malawi where it is only known from areas vegetated with Vallisneria. This species can reach a length of 8.8 centimetres (3.5 in) SL.
