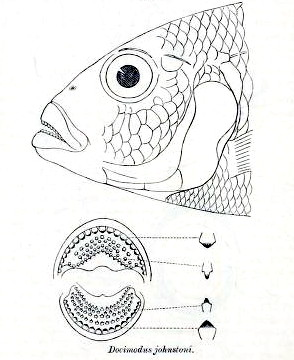

Conservation status
- Least Concern (IUCN 3.1)

Scientific classification
- Kingdom: Animalia
- Phylum: Chordata
- Class: Actinopterygii
- Division: Teleostei
- Order: Cichliformes
- Family: Cichlidae
- Genus: Docimodus
- Species: D. johnstoni

Binomial name
- Docimodus johnstoni Boulenger, 1897

Synonyms
- Docimodus johnstonii (misspelling)

= Docimodus johnstoni =

Species of fish

Docimodus johnstoni is a species of haplochromine cichlid. It is known from Lake Malawi, Lake Malombe, and the upper Shire River in Malawi, Mozambique, and Tanzania. This species has unusual feeding habits: it is reported to feed on fins of clariid catfishes. The specific name honours the British explorer, botanist, linguist and Colonial administrator, Sir Henry Hamilton Johnston GCMG KCB (also known as Sir Harry Johnston) (12 June 1858 – 31 July 1927), who presented the type to the British museum.
