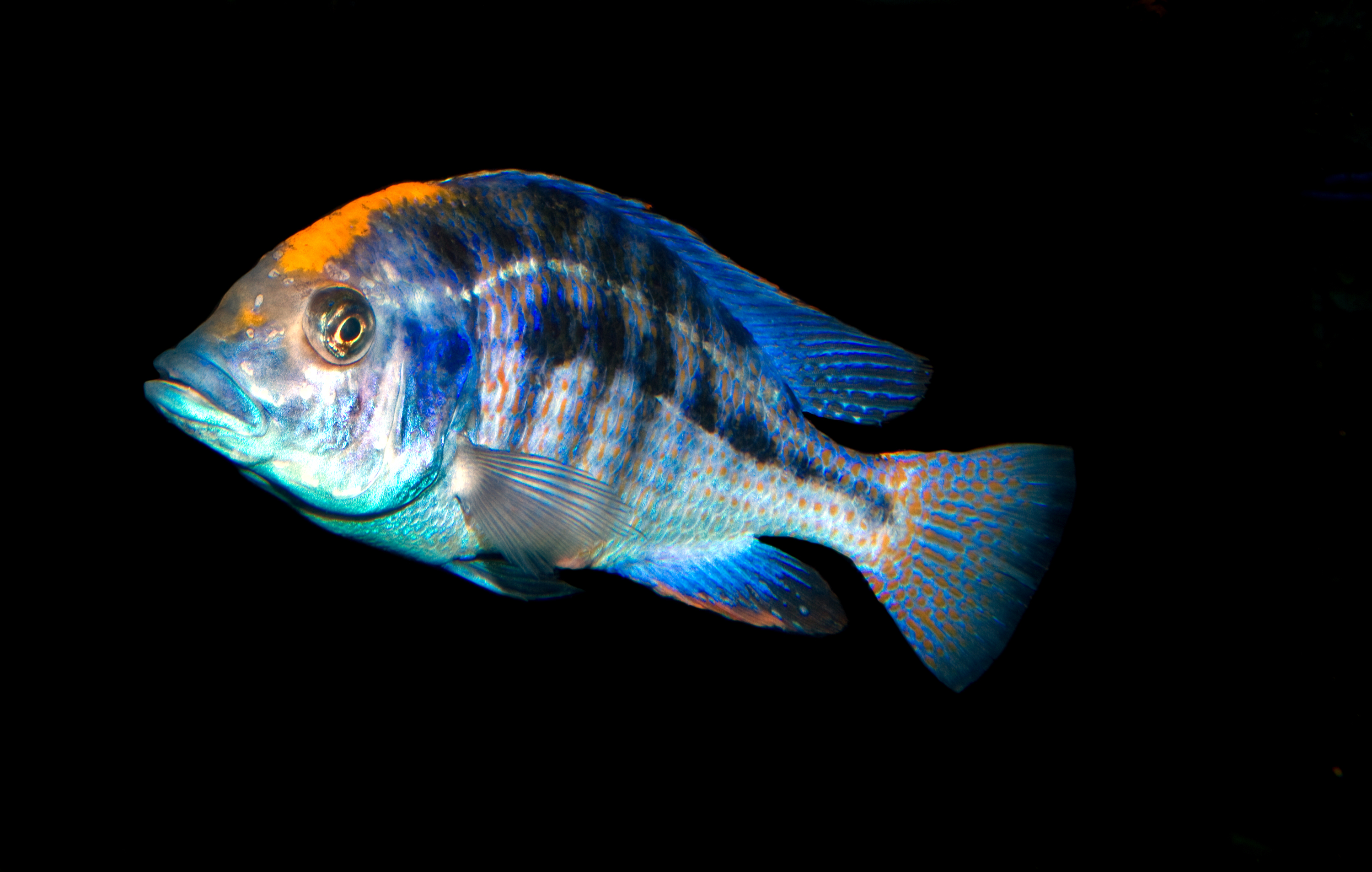

Conservation status
- Least Concern (IUCN 3.1)

Scientific classification
- Kingdom: Animalia
- Phylum: Chordata
- Class: Actinopterygii
- Order: Cichliformes
- Family: Cichlidae
- Genus: Protomelas
- Species: P. spilonotus

Binomial name
- Protomelas spilonotus (Trewavas, 1935)

Synonyms
- Haplochromis spilonotus Trewavas, 1935; Cyrtocara spilonotus (Trewavas, 1935)

= Protomelas spilonotus =

Species of fish

Protomelas spilonotus is a species of cichlid endemic to Lake Malawi where it prefers areas with clean, rocky substrates. This species can reach a length of 16.7 centimetres (6.6 in) TL. It can also be found in the aquarium trade.
