= Taeniochromis holotaenia =

Conservation status
- Least Concern (IUCN 3.1)

Scientific classification
- Kingdom: Animalia
- Phylum: Chordata
- Class: Actinopterygii
- Order: Cichliformes
- Family: Cichlidae
- Subfamily: Pseudocrenilabrinae
- Tribe: Haplochromini
- Genus: Taeniochromis; Eccles & Trewavas, 1989
- Species: T. holotaenia

Binomial name
- Taeniochromis holotaenia (Regan, 1922)

Synonyms
- Haplochromis holotaenia Regan, 1922; Cyrtocara holotaenia (Regan, 1922); Haplochromis bodyi C. G. E. Ahl, 1926

Species of fish

Taeniochromis holotaenia is a species of cichlid endemic to Lake Malawi in East Africa where it is widespread at depths of from 7 to 61 metres (23 to 200 ft). This fish can reach a length of 22 centimetres (8.7 in) TL. It can also be found in the aquarium trade.
