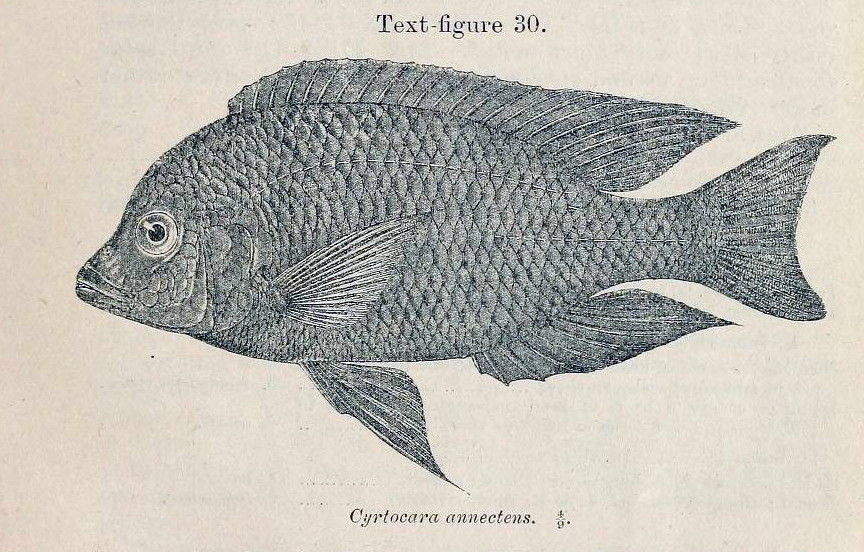

Conservation status
- Least Concern (IUCN 3.1)

Scientific classification
- Kingdom: Animalia
- Phylum: Chordata
- Class: Actinopterygii
- Order: Cichliformes
- Family: Cichlidae
- Genus: Protomelas
- Species: P. annectens

Binomial name
- Protomelas annectens (Regan, 1922)

Synonyms
- Cyrtocara annectens Regan, 1922; Haplochromis annectens (Regan, 1922)

= Protomelas annectens =

Species of fish

Protomelas annectens is a species of cichlid endemic to Lake Malawi where it is found in sandy shallows with large species of cichlid. This species can reach a length of 20 centimetres (7.9 in) TL. This species can also be found in the aquarium trade.
