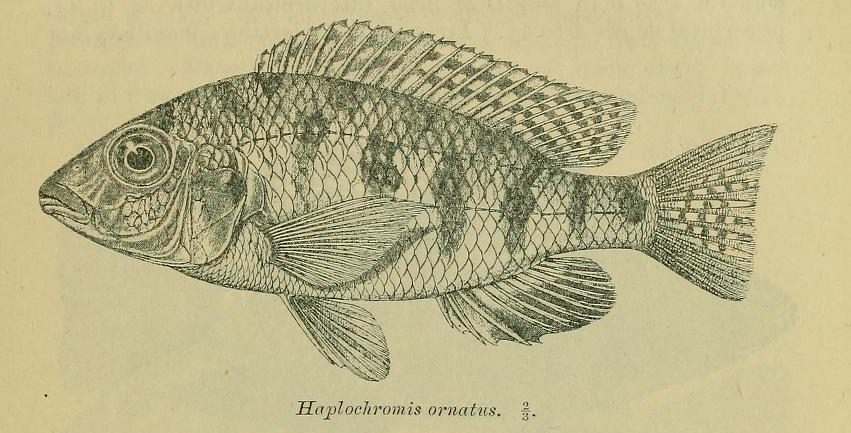

Conservation status
- Least Concern (IUCN 3.1)

Scientific classification
- Kingdom: Animalia
- Phylum: Chordata
- Class: Actinopterygii
- Order: Cichliformes
- Family: Cichlidae
- Genus: Eclectochromis
- Species: E. ornatus

Binomial name
- Eclectochromis ornatus (Regan, 1922)

Synonyms
- Haplochromis ornatus Regan, 1922; Haplochromis festivus Trewavas, 1935

= Eclectochromis ornatus =

Species of fish

Eclectochromis ornatus is a species of haplochromine cichlid which is endemic to Malawi. where it occurs in Lake Malawi and Lake Malombe. It is a predator of invertebrates and of smaller fishes which lives in shallow areas of the lake which have a soft or mixed substrate.
