= Lethrinops microdon =

Conservation status
- Data Deficient (IUCN 3.1)

Scientific classification
- Kingdom: Animalia
- Phylum: Chordata
- Class: Actinopterygii
- Order: Cichliformes
- Family: Cichlidae
- Genus: Lethrinops
- Species: L. microdon

Binomial name
- Lethrinops microdon Eccles & D. S. C. Lewis, 1977

Species of fish

Lethrinops microdon is an endangered species of cichlid endemic to the southern part of Lake Malawi where it occurs at depths of 35 to 100 metres (115 to 328 ft) in areas with soft substrates. This species grow to a length of 13.1 centimetres (5.2 in) SL. The species is threatened by trawl fisheries and has greatly declined but little is known about its population and distribution within Lake Malawi, it is given a status of Data Deficient by the IUCN.
