= Lethrinops altus =

Conservation status
- Least Concern (IUCN 3.1)

Scientific classification
- Kingdom: Animalia
- Phylum: Chordata
- Class: Actinopterygii
- Order: Cichliformes
- Family: Cichlidae
- Genus: Lethrinops
- Species: L. altus

Binomial name
- Lethrinops altus Trewavas, 1931

Species of fish

Lethrinops altus is a species of cichlid endemic to Lake Malawi where it occurs in areas with sandy substrates. This species grows to a length of 15.8 centimetres (6.2 in) TL.
