= Lethrinops mylodon =

Conservation status
- Least Concern (IUCN 3.1)

Scientific classification
- Kingdom: Animalia
- Phylum: Chordata
- Class: Actinopterygii
- Order: Cichliformes
- Family: Cichlidae
- Genus: Lethrinops
- Species: L. mylodon

Binomial name
- Lethrinops mylodon Eccles & D.S.C. Lewis 1979

Species of fish

Lethrinops mylodon is a species of haplochromine cichlid which is endemic to Lake Malawi where it is widespread. It is a species of deeper water over sandy substrates which feeds mainly on gastropods

== Description ==
Lethrinops mylodon has a very deep-body and a large head and eye, it can be told apart from Lethrinops gossei by the lack of a V-shaped incisionc in the upper mandible and by having less lower gillrakers, L. myodon has 12–14 compared to L. gossei which has 18–20. The massively enlarged molar-like pharyngeal teeth distinguish this species from all the other deep-bodies species in the genus Lethrinops. Sexually active males have a golden-bronze colour and are frequently marked with distinct vertical bars, they have a bright blue head and many large yellow egg-spots on their anal fin. They grow to 25 centimetres (9.8 in) in total length.

== Distribution ==
Lethrinops mylodon is endemic to Lake Malawi where it is distributed throughout the lake.

== Habitat and biology ==
It feeds mainly on snails. It lives on sandy substrates from depths of 40 to 70 metres (130 to 230 ft), although it has been recorded as deep as 110 metres (360 ft).

== Conservation ==
The populations of Lethrinops mylodon in the south eastern arm of the Lake have shown marked declines starting in the early 1970s and lasting at least to the 1990s. This decline has probably been caused by intensive trawling in this part of the Lake. This species is rare in other parts of Lake Malawi.

== Taxonomy ==
In 1979 Eccles & Lewis described a northern subspecies L. m. borealis which they distinguished from the nominate on the lower pharyngeal bone being more elongated and having an obviously concave lower surface. They collected this form in Nkhata Bay, while the "nominate" was recorded as far north as Nkhotakota. Later authors regarded borealis as a valid species but others have argued that the subspecific status of borealis seems dubious, given the known variation in the cited distinguishing features in cichlids. There have been no subsequent records of the form borealis since 1979 and most of the specimens have been mislaid.
