= Nyassachromis nigritaeniatus =

Conservation status
- Least Concern (IUCN 3.1)

Scientific classification
- Kingdom: Animalia
- Phylum: Chordata
- Class: Actinopterygii
- Order: Cichliformes
- Family: Cichlidae
- Genus: Nyassachromis
- Species: N. nigritaeniatus

Binomial name
- Nyassachromis nigritaeniatus (Trewavas, 1935)

Synonyms
- Haplochromis nigritaeniatus Trewavas, 1935; Cyrtocara nigritaeniata (Trewavas, 1935)

Species of fish

Nyassachromis nigritaeniatus is a species of cichlid endemic to Lake Malawi where it prefers areas with sandy substrates. This species can reach a length of 21 centimetres (8.3 in) TL. It can also be found in the aquarium trade.
