= Tramitichromis variabilis =

Conservation status
- Least Concern (IUCN 3.1)

Scientific classification
- Kingdom: Animalia
- Phylum: Chordata
- Class: Actinopterygii
- Order: Cichliformes
- Family: Cichlidae
- Genus: Tramitichromis
- Species: T. variabilis

Binomial name
- Tramitichromis variabilis (Trewavas, 1931)

Synonyms
- Lethrinops variabilis Trewavas, 1931

Species of fish

Tramitichromis variabilis is a species of cichlid endemic to Lake Malawi where it is found over sand/rock substrates at about 10 metres (33 ft) depth. It can reach a length of 17.3 centimetres (6.8 in) TL. It can also be found in the aquarium trade.
