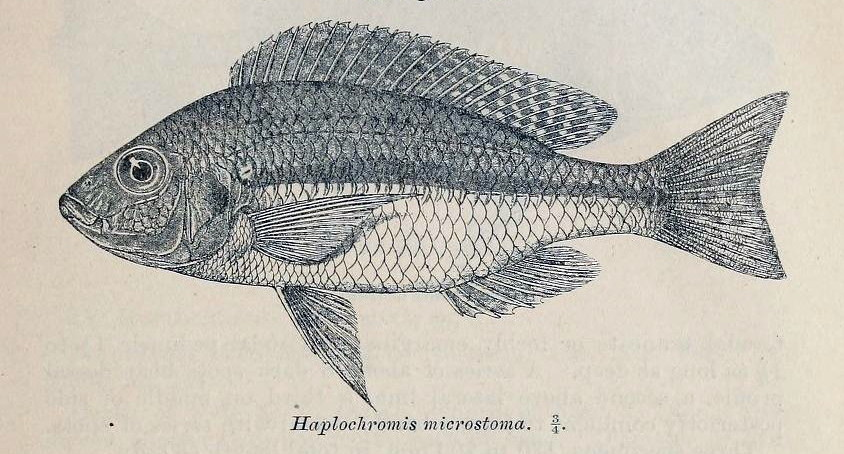

Conservation status
- Least Concern (IUCN 3.1)

Scientific classification
- Kingdom: Animalia
- Phylum: Chordata
- Class: Actinopterygii
- Order: Cichliformes
- Family: Cichlidae
- Genus: Protomelas
- Species: P. pleurotaenia

Binomial name
- Protomelas pleurotaenia (Boulenger, 1901)

Synonyms
- Tilapia pleurotaenia Boulenger, 1901; Cyrtocara pleurotaenia (Boulenger, 1901); Haplochromis pleurotaenia (Boulenger, 1901); Limnotilapia pleurotaenia (Boulenger, 1901); Haplochromis microstoma Regan, 1922

= Protomelas pleurotaenia =

Species of fish

Protomelas pleurotaenia is a species of cichlid endemic to Lake Malawi where it is only known from Monkey Bay and Nkhata Bay where it is known to occur from the surface to 10 metres (33 ft). This species can reach a length of 14.1 centimetres (5.6 in) TL. This species can also be found in the aquarium trade.
