= Taeniolethrinops laticeps =

Conservation status
- Least Concern (IUCN 3.1)

Scientific classification
- Kingdom: Animalia
- Phylum: Chordata
- Class: Actinopterygii
- Division: Teleostei
- Order: Cichliformes
- Family: Cichlidae
- Genus: Taeniolethrinops
- Species: T. laticeps

Binomial name
- Taeniolethrinops laticeps (Trewavas, 1931)

Synonyms
- Lethrinops laticeps Trewavas, 1931

Species of fish

Taeniolethrinops laticeps is a species of cichlid endemic to Lake Malawi where it occurs over sandy substrates. This species can reach a length of 30 centimetres (12 in) TL. it was discovered by Ethelwynn Trewavas.
