= Lethrinops argenteus =

Conservation status
- Least Concern (IUCN 3.1)

Scientific classification
- Kingdom: Animalia
- Phylum: Chordata
- Class: Actinopterygii
- Order: Cichliformes
- Family: Cichlidae
- Genus: Lethrinops
- Species: L. argenteus

Binomial name
- Lethrinops argenteus C. G. E. Ahl, 1926

Species of fish

Lethrinops argenteus is a species of cichlid endemic to Lake Malawi. This species grows to a length of 19 centimetres (7.5 in) TL.
