= Protomelas virgatus =

Conservation status
- Least Concern (IUCN 3.1)

Scientific classification
- Kingdom: Animalia
- Phylum: Chordata
- Class: Actinopterygii
- Order: Cichliformes
- Family: Cichlidae
- Genus: Protomelas
- Species: P. virgatus

Binomial name
- Protomelas virgatus (Trewavas, 1935)

Synonyms
- Haplochromis virgatus Trewavas, 1935; Cyrtocara virgata (Trewavas, 1935)

Species of fish

Protomelas virgatus is a species of cichlid endemic to Lake Malawi. This species can reach a length of 14 centimetres (5.5 in) SL. It can also be found in the aquarium trade.
