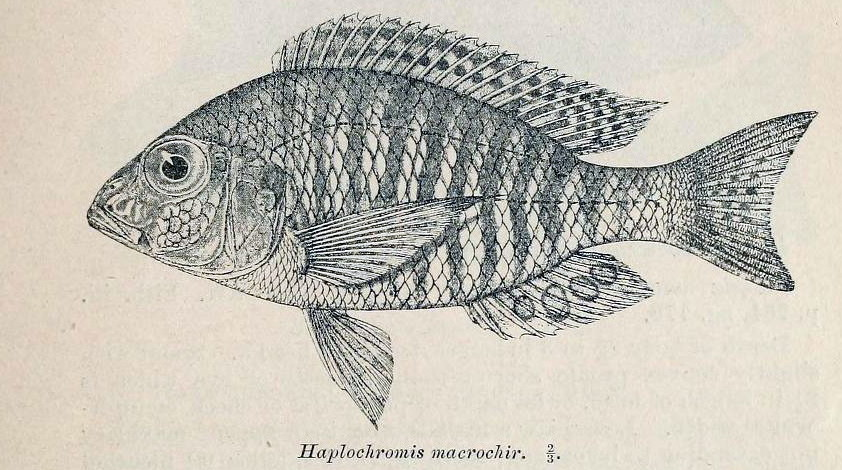

Conservation status
- Least Concern (IUCN 3.1)

Scientific classification
- Kingdom: Animalia
- Phylum: Chordata
- Class: Actinopterygii
- Order: Cichliformes
- Family: Cichlidae
- Genus: Lethrinops
- Species: L. macrochir

Binomial name
- Lethrinops macrochir (Regan, 1922)

Synonyms
- Haplochromis macrochir Regan, 1922

= Lethrinops macrochir =

Species of fish

Lethrinops macrochir is a species of cichlid endemic to Lake Malawi where it prefers shallow waters with a sandy substrate. This species grows to a length of 13 centimetres (5.1 in) TL.
