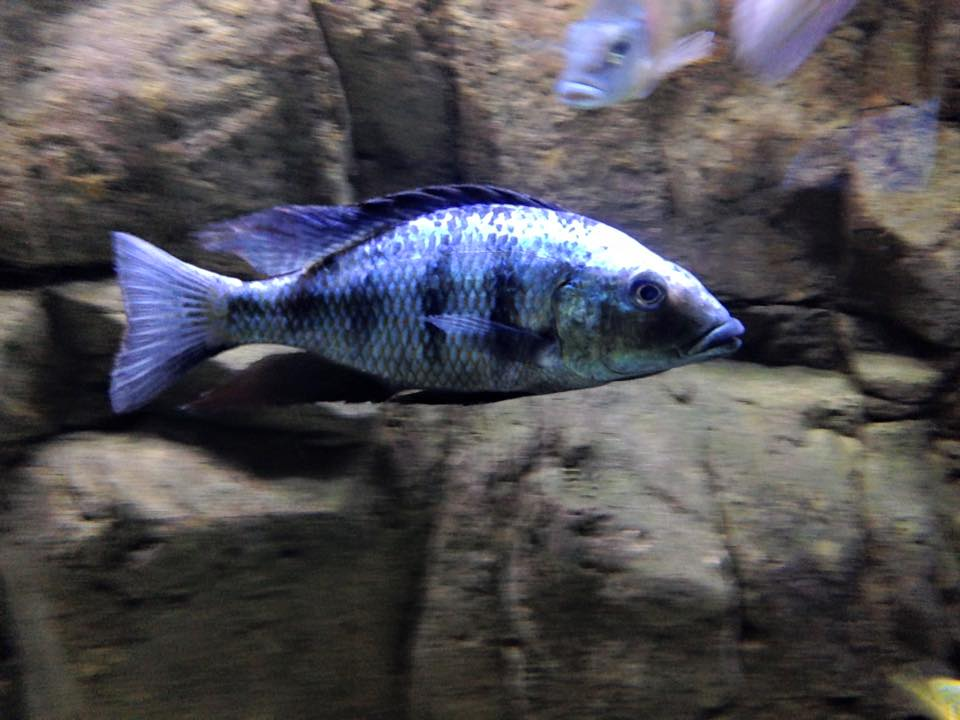
- male

Conservation status
- Least Concern (IUCN 3.1)

Scientific classification
- Kingdom: Animalia
- Phylum: Chordata
- Class: Actinopterygii
- Order: Cichliformes
- Family: Cichlidae
- Genus: Fossorochromis; Eccles & Trewavas, 1989
- Species: F. rostratus

Binomial name
- Fossorochromis rostratus (Boulenger, 1899)

Synonyms
- Tilapia rostrata Boulenger, 1899; Cyrtocara rostrata (Boulenger, 1899); Haplochromis rostratus (Boulenger, 1899); Haplochromis macrorhynchus Regan, 1922

= Fossorochromis =

Species of fish

Fossorochromis rostratus is a species of cichlid fish that is endemic to Lake Malawi in East Africa. The only species in its genus, it is a relatively large (up to 24.4 centimetres (9.6 in) in total length), sexually dimorphic cichlid.

It feeds on small invertebrates that often are caught by sifting mouthfuls of sand. As for most cichlids, brood care is highly developed, the eggs and larvae being mouthbrooded by the female.
