= Nyassachromis boadzulu =

Conservation status
- Endangered (IUCN 3.1)

Scientific classification
- Kingdom: Animalia
- Phylum: Chordata
- Class: Actinopterygii
- Order: Cichliformes
- Family: Cichlidae
- Genus: Nyassachromis
- Species: N. boadzulu

Binomial name
- Nyassachromis boadzulu (Iles, 1960)

Synonyms
- Haplochromis boadzulu Iles, 1960; Copadichromis boadzulu (Iles, 1960); Cyrtocara boadzulu (Iles, 1960)

Species of fish

Nyassachromis boadzulu is a species of haplochromine cichlid. It is endemic to Lake Malawi where it occurs off Boadzulu Island and White Rock in the south-eastern arm of the lake.
