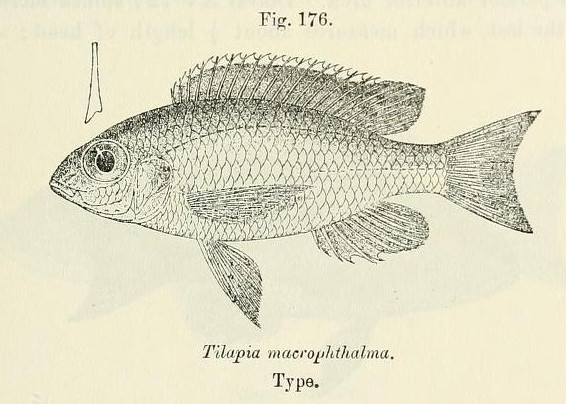

Conservation status
- Least Concern (IUCN 3.1)

Scientific classification
- Kingdom: Animalia
- Phylum: Chordata
- Class: Actinopterygii
- Order: Cichliformes
- Family: Cichlidae
- Genus: Lethrinops
- Species: L. macrophthalmus

Binomial name
- Lethrinops macrophthalmus (Boulenger,1908)

Synonyms
- Tilapia macrophthalma Boulenger, 1908; Haplochromis macrophthalmus (Boulenger, 1908)

= Lethrinops macrophthalmus =

Species of fish

Lethrinops macrophthalmus is a species of cichlid endemic to Lake Malawi where it is known to occur in the Nkhotakota area. It prefers habitats with patches of Vallisneria. This species grows to a length of 12 centimetres (4.7 in) SL.
