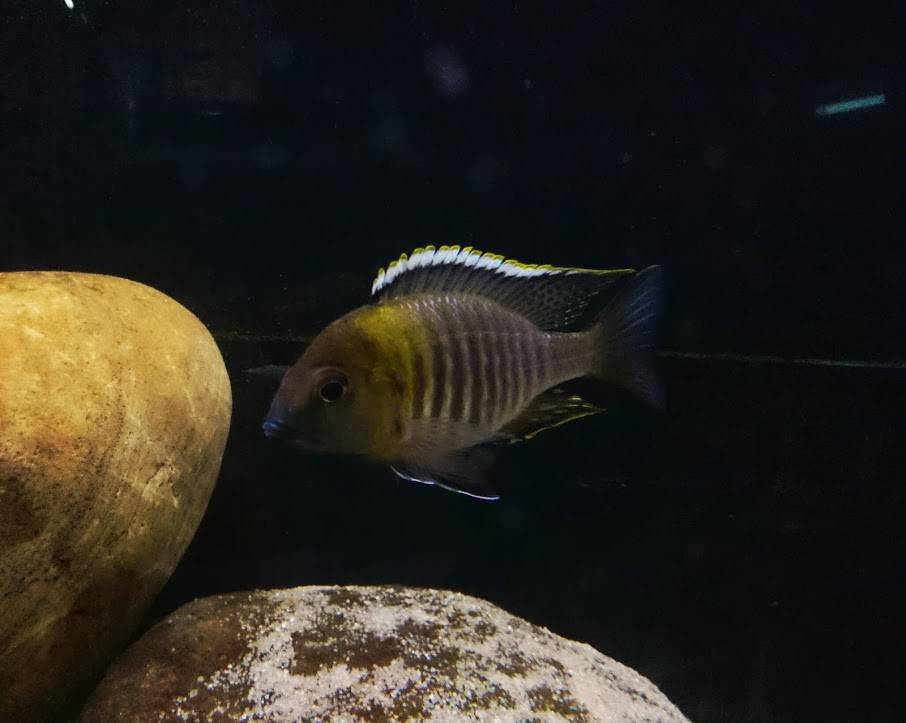

Conservation status
- Data Deficient (IUCN 3.1)

Scientific classification
- Kingdom: Animalia
- Phylum: Chordata
- Class: Actinopterygii
- Order: Cichliformes
- Family: Cichlidae
- Genus: Lethrinops
- Species: L. micrentodon

Binomial name
- Lethrinops micrentodon (Regan, 1922)

Synonyms
- Haplochromis micrentodon Regan, 1922

= Lethrinops micrentodon =

Species of fish

Lethrinops micrentodon is a species of cichlid endemic to Lake Malawi. This species grows to a length of 11.5 centimetres (4.5 in) TL. It can also be found in the aquarium trade.
