= Naevochromis chrysogaster =

Conservation status
- Least Concern (IUCN 3.1)

Scientific classification
- Kingdom: Animalia
- Phylum: Chordata
- Class: Actinopterygii
- Order: Cichliformes
- Family: Cichlidae
- Subfamily: Pseudocrenilabrinae
- Tribe: Haplochromini
- Genus: Naevochromis; Eccles & Trewavas, 1989
- Species: N. chrysogaster

Binomial name
- Naevochromis chrysogaster (Trewavas, 1935)

Synonyms
- Haplochromis chrysogaster Trewavas, 1935; Cyrtocara chrysogaster (Trewavas, 1935); Otopharynx chrysogaster (Trewavas, 1935)

Species of fish

Naevochromis chrysogaster is a species of cichlid endemic to Lake Malawi where it prefers areas with rocky substrates. This species has a specialized diet, feeding on the fry and larvae of other cichlids. It reaches a total length of 17.9 cm (7.0 in). This species is also seen in the aquarium trade and sometimes goes by the name Haplochromis Jack Dempsey. It is currently the only known member of the genus Naevochromis.
