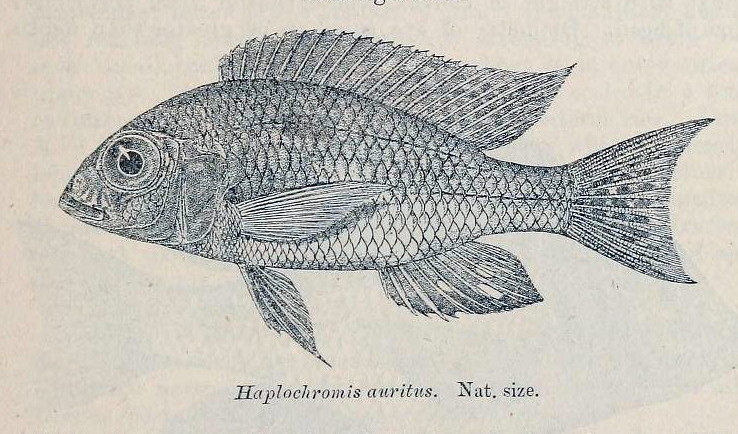

Conservation status
- Least Concern (IUCN 3.1)

Scientific classification
- Kingdom: Animalia
- Phylum: Chordata
- Class: Actinopterygii
- Order: Cichliformes
- Family: Cichlidae
- Genus: Lethrinops
- Species: L. auritus

Binomial name
- Lethrinops auritus (Regan, 1922)

Synonyms
- Haplochromis auritus Regan, 1922

= Golden sand-eater =

Species of fish

The golden sand-eater (Lethrinops auritus) is a species of cichlid fish endemic to Lake Malawi where it prefers shallow waters with muddy substrates. This species grows to a length of 14 centimetres (5.5 in) TL. It can also be found in the aquarium trade.
