= Lethrinops christyi =

Conservation status
- Least Concern (IUCN 3.1)

Scientific classification
- Kingdom: Animalia
- Phylum: Chordata
- Class: Actinopterygii
- Order: Cichliformes
- Family: Cichlidae
- Genus: Lethrinops
- Species: L. christyi

Binomial name
- Lethrinops christyi Trewavas, 1931

Species of fish

Lethrinops christyi is a species of cichlid endemic to Lake Malawi where it is only known from the southern part of the lake. This species grows to a length of 18.3 centimetres (7.2 in) TL.

== Etymology ==
The specific name honours the collector of the type, Cuthbert Christy (1863-1932), an explorer and naturalist.
