= Lethrinops macracanthus =

Conservation status
- Data Deficient (IUCN 3.1)

Scientific classification
- Kingdom: Animalia
- Phylum: Chordata
- Class: Actinopterygii
- Order: Cichliformes
- Family: Cichlidae
- Genus: Lethrinops
- Species: L. macracanthus

Binomial name
- Lethrinops macracanthus Trewavas, 1931

Species of fish

Lethrinops macracanthus is a species of cichlid endemic to Lake Malawi where it occurs in deep waters (35 to 65 metres (115 to 213 ft)) over sandy substrates. This species grows to a length of 20 centimetres (7.9 in) TL.
