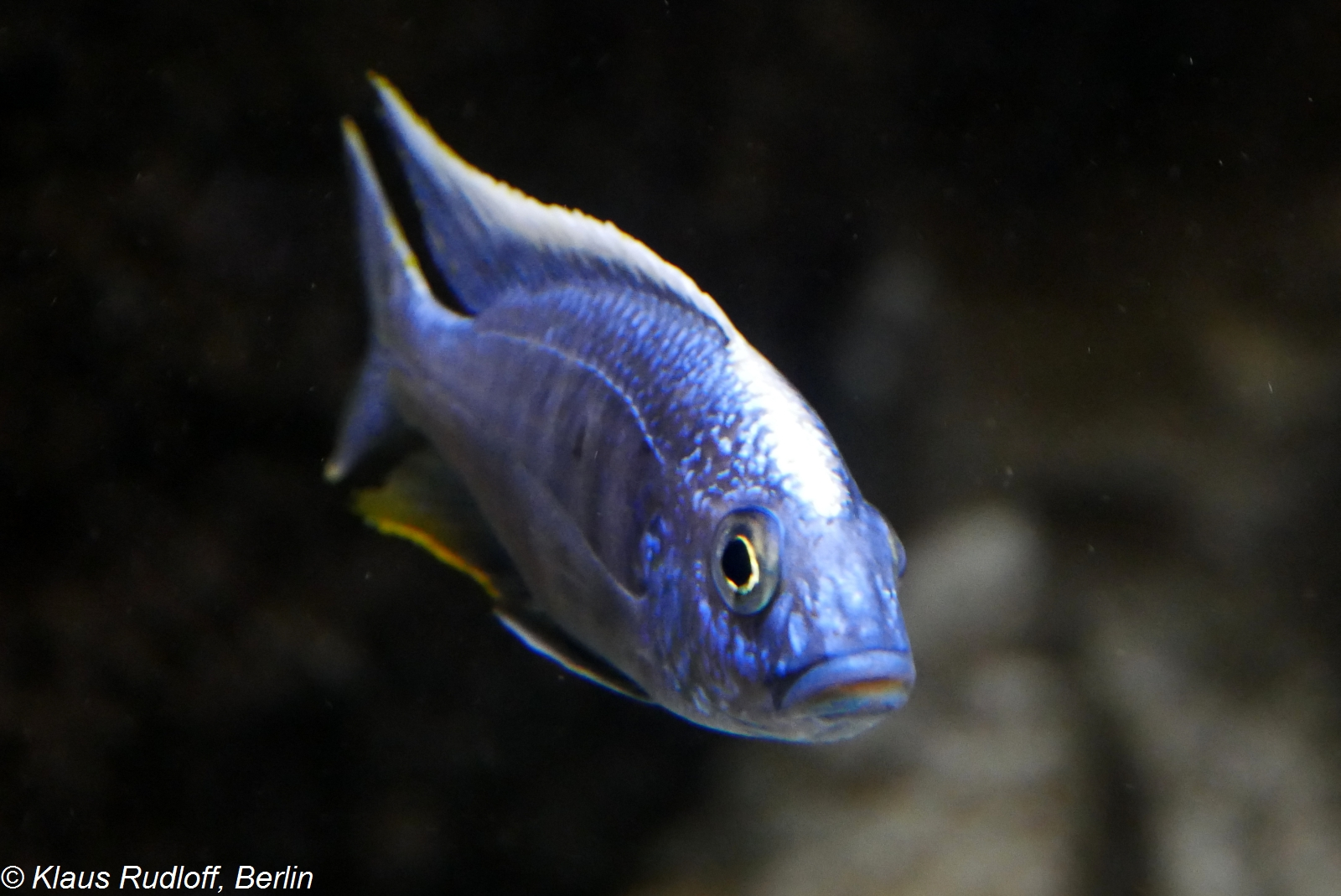

Conservation status
- Least Concern (IUCN 3.1)

Scientific classification
- Kingdom: Animalia
- Phylum: Chordata
- Class: Actinopterygii
- Order: Cichliformes
- Family: Cichlidae
- Genus: Protomelas
- Species: P. fenestratus

Binomial name
- Protomelas fenestratus (Trewavas, 1935)

Synonyms
- Haplochromis fenestratus Trewavas, 1935; Cyrtocara fenestratus (Trewavas, 1935)

= Fenestratus =

Species of fish

The fenestratus (Protomelas fenestratus) is a species of cichlid fish endemic to Lake Malawi in East Africa. This species can reach a length of 14 centimetres (5.5 in) TL. It can also be found in the aquarium trade. Protomelas fenestratus is a substrate blower. They blow away the substrate, to uncover insect larvae and crustaceans. They are characterized by vertical bars, and thin horizontal lines of varying darkness depending on location. The males blue colouration obscures the barring when dominant. The lattice like pattern on this fish's body is reminiscent of windows which is what the specific name fenestratus refers to.
