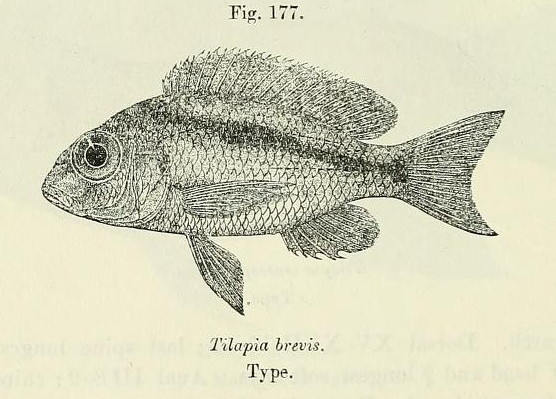

Conservation status
- Least Concern (IUCN 3.1)

Scientific classification
- Kingdom: Animalia
- Phylum: Chordata
- Class: Actinopterygii
- Order: Cichliformes
- Family: Cichlidae
- Genus: Tramitichromis
- Species: T. brevis

Binomial name
- Tramitichromis brevis (Boulenger, 1908)

Synonyms
- Tilapia brevis Boulenger, 1908; Haplochromis brevis (Boulenger, 1908); Lethrinops brevis (Boulenger, 1908)

= Tramitichromis brevis =

Species of fish

Tramitichromis brevis is a species of cichlid endemic to Lake Malawi where it is found over sandy substrates or sand/rock substrates at about 15 metres (49 ft) depth. It can reach a length of 16.3 centimetres (6.4 in) TL. It can also be found in the aquarium trade.
