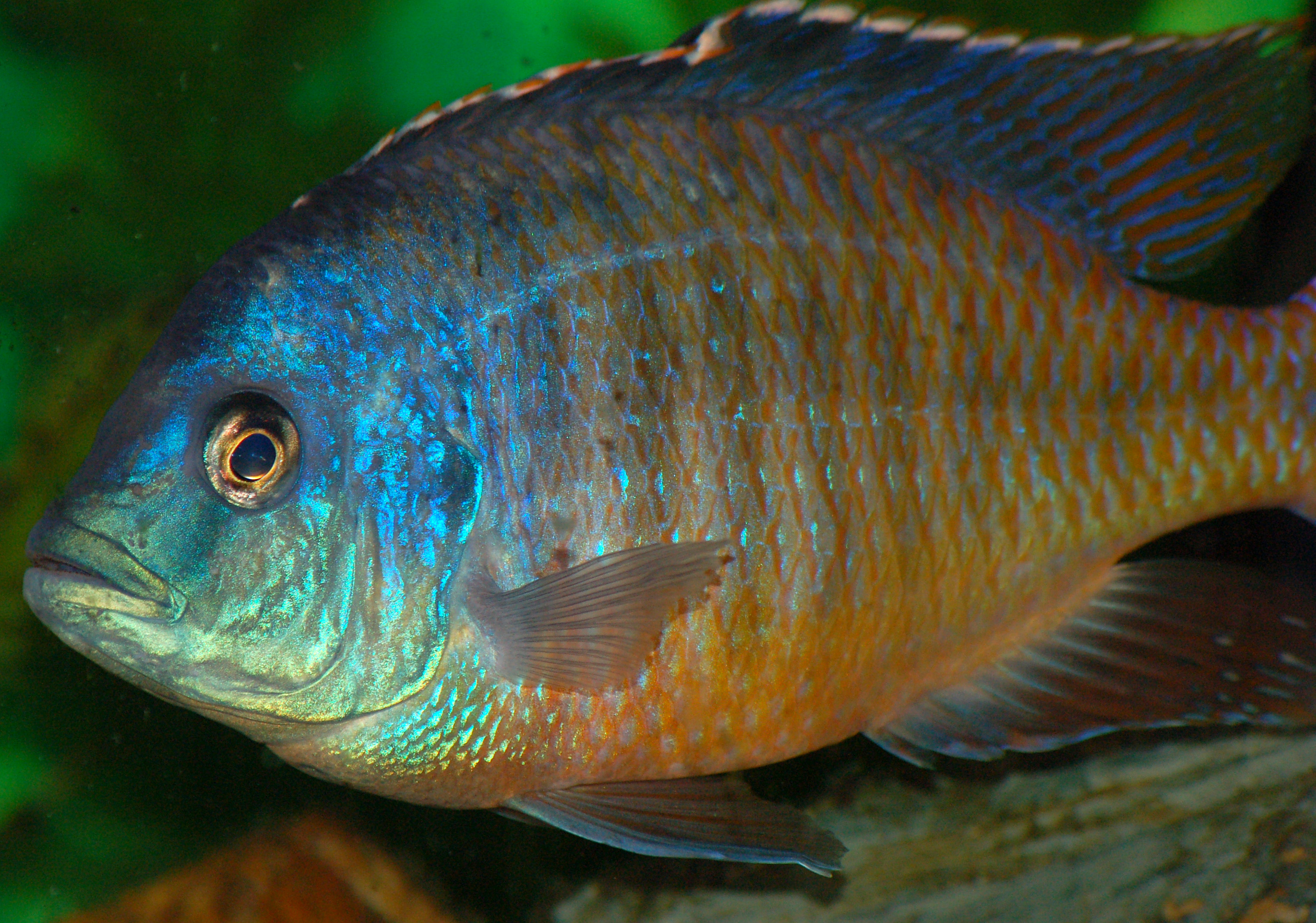
- Male red empress (P. taeniolatus)

Scientific classification
- Kingdom: Animalia
- Phylum: Chordata
- Class: Actinopterygii
- Division: Teleostei
- Order: Cichliformes
- Family: Cichlidae
- Tribe: Haplochromini
- Genus: Protomelas; Eccles & Trewavas, 1989

Type species
- Chromis kirkii Günther, 1894

Species
- 16, see text

= Protomelas =

Genus of fishes

Protomelas is a genus of haplochromine cichlids endemic to Lake Malawi in East Africa. The genus is part of the haplochromine tribe and have maternal mouthbrooding and sexual dimorphism typical of this group. Popular in the aquarium hobby, Protomelas species are sold under a variety of trade names (e.g., Taiwan Reef Cichlid, Red Empress Cichlid).

== Species ==
There are currently 16 recognized species in this genus:

- Protomelas annectens (Regan, 1922)
- Protomelas dejunctus Stauffer, 1993 (fire blue hap)
- Protomelas fenestratus (Trewavas, 1935) (fenestratus hap)
- Protomelas insignis (Trewavas, 1935) (one-and-a-half-stripe hap)
- Protomelas kirkii (Günther, 1894)
- Protomelas krampus Dierickx & Snoeks, 2020
- Protomelas labridens (Trewavas, 1935)
- Protomelas macrodon Eccles, 1989
- Protomelas marginatus (Trewavas, 1935)
- Protomelas pleurotaenia (Boulenger, 1901)
- Protomelas similis (Regan, 1922)
- Protomelas spilonotus (Trewavas, 1935)
- Protomelas spilopterus (Trewavas, 1935)
- Protomelas taeniolatus (Trewavas, 1935) (red empress, spindle hap)
- Protomelas triaenodon (Trewavas, 1935)
- Protomelas virgatus (Trewavas, 1935)
