= Tyrannochromis maculiceps =

Conservation status
- Least Concern (IUCN 3.1)

Scientific classification
- Kingdom: Animalia
- Phylum: Chordata
- Class: Actinopterygii
- Order: Cichliformes
- Family: Cichlidae
- Genus: Tyrannochromis
- Species: T. maculiceps

Binomial name
- Tyrannochromis maculiceps (C. G. E. Ahl, 1926)

Synonyms
- Haplochromis maculiceps Ahl, 1926; Cyrtocara maculiceps (Ahl, 1927) Haplochromis macrostoma; (Regan, 1922)

Species of fish

Tyrannochromis maculiceps is a species of the Cichlid family. The fish is endemic to Lake Malawi. Tyrannochromis maculiceps Total length is 29.5 centimetres (11.6 in).

== Status ==
As of 2024, the IUCN has evaluated Tyrannochromis maculiceps as a synonym of T. macrostoma.
