= Lethrinops gossei =

Conservation status
- Least Concern (IUCN 3.1)

Scientific classification
- Kingdom: Animalia
- Phylum: Chordata
- Class: Actinopterygii
- Order: Cichliformes
- Family: Cichlidae
- Genus: Lethrinops
- Species: L. gossei

Binomial name
- Lethrinops gossei W. E. Burgess & H. R. Axelrod, 1973

Species of fish

Lethrinops gossei is a species of cichlid endemic to Lake Malawi where it is usually found in deep waters (90 to 130 metres (300 to 430 ft)) with muddy substrates in the southern portion of the lake. This species grows to a length of 14.4 centimetres (5.7 in) SL.

== Etymology ==
The specific name honours the Belgian zoologist Jean-Pierre Gosse (1924–2001), who was the curator of vertebrates at the Institut Royal des Sciences Naturelles de Belgique.
