= Lethrinops red flush =

Conservation status
- Least Concern (IUCN 3.1)

Scientific classification
- Kingdom: Animalia
- Phylum: Chordata
- Class: Actinopterygii
- Order: Cichliformes
- Family: Cichlidae
- Genus: Lethrinops
- Species: L. parvidens

Binomial name
- Lethrinops parvidens Trewavas, 1931

Species of fish

The Lethrinops red flush (Lethrinops parvidens) is a species of cichlid fish endemic to Lake Malawi where it is found over sandy substrates in the southern portion of the lake. This species grows to a length of 14 centimetres (5.5 in) SL.
