= Tramitichromis trilineatus =

Conservation status
- Least Concern (IUCN 3.1)

Scientific classification
- Kingdom: Animalia
- Phylum: Chordata
- Class: Actinopterygii
- Order: Cichliformes
- Family: Cichlidae
- Genus: Tramitichromis
- Species: T. trilineatus

Binomial name
- Tramitichromis trilineatus (Trewavas, 1931)

Synonyms
- Lethrinops trilineata Trewavas, 1931

Species of fish

Tramitichromis trilineatus is a species of cichlid endemic to Lake Malawi where it occurs in the southeastern portion of the lake, preferring shallow waters with sandy substrates. It can reach a length of 14 centimetres (5.5 in) TL. It can also be found in the aquarium trade.
