= Littletooth sandeater =

Conservation status
- Least Concern (IUCN 3.1)

Scientific classification
- Kingdom: Animalia
- Phylum: Chordata
- Class: Actinopterygii
- Order: Cichliformes
- Family: Cichlidae
- Genus: Lethrinops
- Species: L. microstoma

Binomial name
- Lethrinops microstoma Trewavas, 1931

Species of fish

The littletooth sandeater (Lethrinops microstoma) is a species of cichlid endemic to Lake Malawi where it is known from sandy areas around Cape Maclear and in Senga Bay. This species grows to a length of 14.5 centimetres (5.7 in) TL. It can also be found in the aquarium trade.
