= Taeniolethrinops cyrtonotus =

Conservation status
- Least Concern (IUCN 3.1)

Scientific classification
- Kingdom: Animalia
- Phylum: Chordata
- Class: Actinopterygii
- Order: Cichliformes
- Family: Cichlidae
- Genus: Taeniolethrinops
- Species: T. cyrtonotus

Binomial name
- Taeniolethrinops cyrtonotus (Trewavas, 1931)

Synonyms
- Lethrinops cyrtonotus Trewavas, 1931

Species of fish

Taeniolethrinops cyrtonotus is a species of cichlid endemic to Lake Malawi over areas with sandy substrates at depths of from 20 to 60 metres (66 to 197 ft). This species can reach a length of 11.2 centimetres (4.4 in) TL.
