= Nyassachromis microcephalus =

Conservation status
- Least Concern (IUCN 3.1)

Scientific classification
- Kingdom: Animalia
- Phylum: Chordata
- Class: Actinopterygii
- Order: Cichliformes
- Family: Cichlidae
- Genus: Nyassachromis
- Species: N. microcephalus

Binomial name
- Nyassachromis microcephalus (Trewavas, 1935)

Synonyms
- Haplochromis microcephalus Trewavas, 1935; Cyrtocara microcephalus (Trewavas, 1935)

Species of fish

Nyassachromis microcephalus is a species of cichlid endemic to Lake Malawi where it prefers areas with sandy substrates. This species can reach a length of 15 centimetres (5.9 in) TL. It can also be found in the aquarium trade.
