= Tramitichromis lituris =

Conservation status
- Least Concern (IUCN 3.1)

Scientific classification
- Kingdom: Animalia
- Phylum: Chordata
- Class: Actinopterygii
- Order: Cichliformes
- Family: Cichlidae
- Genus: Tramitichromis
- Species: T. lituris

Binomial name
- Tramitichromis lituris (Trewavas, 1931)

Synonyms
- Lethrinops lituris Trewavas, 1931

Species of fish

Tramitichromis lituris is a species of cichlid endemic to Lake Malawi where it prefers sandy shallows. It can reach a length of 16.8 centimetres (6.6 in) TL. It can also be found in the aquarium trade.
