= Protomelas marginatus =

Conservation status
- Least Concern (IUCN 3.1)

Scientific classification
- Kingdom: Animalia
- Phylum: Chordata
- Class: Actinopterygii
- Order: Cichliformes
- Family: Cichlidae
- Genus: Protomelas
- Species: P. marginatus

Binomial name
- Protomelas marginatus (Trewavas, 1935)

Synonyms
- Haplochromis marginatus Trewavas, 1935; Cyrtocara marginata (Trewavas, 1935); Cyrtocara marginata marginata (Trewavas, 1935); Protomelas marginatus marginatus (Trewavas, 1935); Haplochromis marginatus vuae Trewavas, 1935; Cyrtocara marginata vuae (Trewavas, 1935); Protomelas marginatus vuae (Trewavas, 1935)

Species of fish

Protomelas marginatus is a species of cichlid endemic to Lake Malawi where it prefers shallow, vegetated waters. This species can reach a length of 16.6 centimetres (6.5 in) TL. It can also be found in the aquarium trade.
