= Threespot torpedo =

Conservation status
- Least Concern (IUCN 3.1)

Scientific classification
- Kingdom: Animalia
- Phylum: Chordata
- Class: Actinopterygii
- Order: Cichliformes
- Family: Cichlidae
- Subfamily: Pseudocrenilabrinae
- Tribe: Haplochromini
- Genus: Exochochromis; Eccles & Trewavas, 1989
- Species: E. anagenys

Binomial name
- Exochochromis anagenys M. K. Oliver, 1989

Species of fish

Exochochromis anagenys, the threespot torpedo, is a species of haplochromine cichlid endemic to Lake Malawi in East Africa where it has been found around Thumbi West Island and in the southeastern part of the lake. It is also found in the aquarium trade. This species reaches a length of 20 centimetres (7.9 in) SL. It is currently the only known member of its genus.
