= Nyassachromis serenus =

Conservation status
- Least Concern (IUCN 3.1)

Scientific classification
- Kingdom: Animalia
- Phylum: Chordata
- Class: Actinopterygii
- Division: Teleostei
- Order: Cichliformes
- Family: Cichlidae
- Genus: Nyassachromis
- Species: N. serenus

Binomial name
- Nyassachromis serenus (Trewavas, 1935)

Synonyms
- Haplochromis serenus Trewavas, 1935; Cyrtocara serena (Trewavas, 1935)

Species of fish

Nyassachromis serenus is a species of cichlid endemic to Lake Malawi where it is only known from the northern part of the lake, preferring habitats over sand-rock interfaces. This species can reach a length of 25 centimetres (9.8 in) TL. It can also be found in the aquarium trade.

== See also ==
- Lake Malawi
- Cichlid
- Freshwater fish
- Aquarium fish
