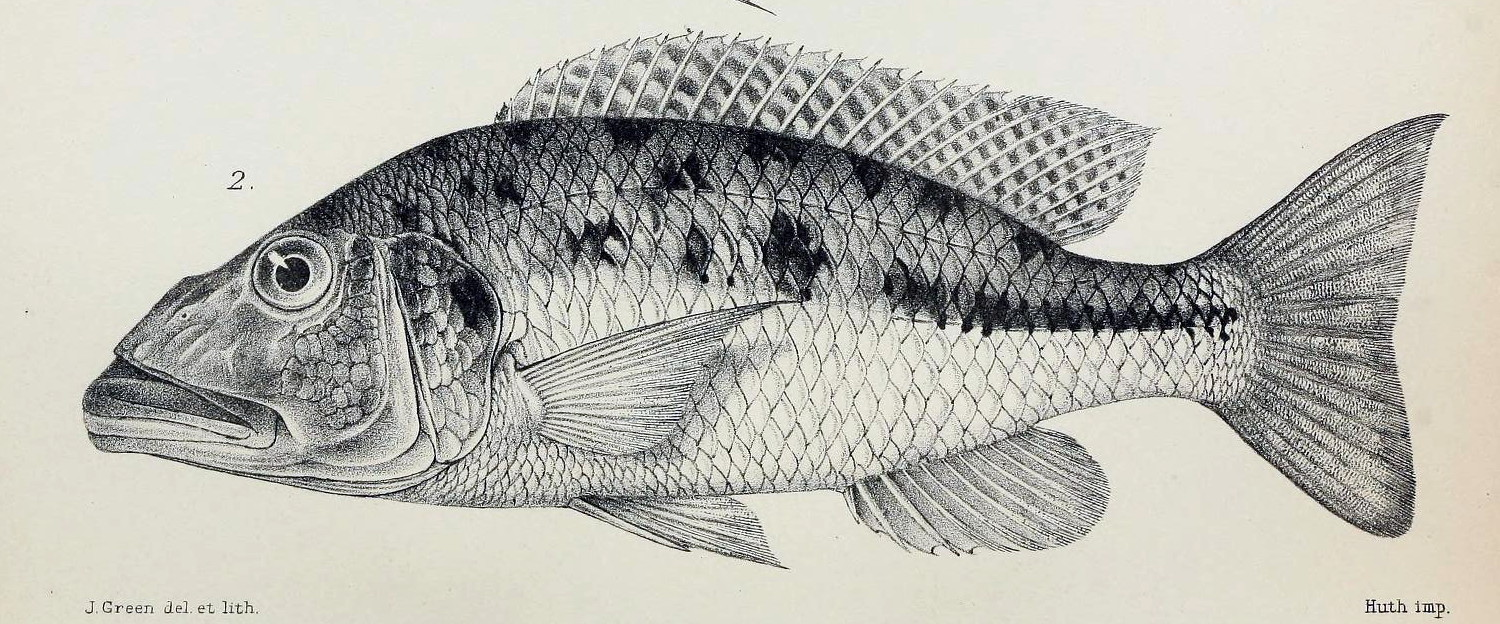

Conservation status
- Least Concern (IUCN 3.1)

Scientific classification
- Kingdom: Animalia
- Phylum: Chordata
- Class: Actinopterygii
- Order: Cichliformes
- Family: Cichlidae
- Genus: Tyrannochromis
- Species: T. macrostoma

Binomial name
- Tyrannochromis macrostoma (Regan, 1922)

Synonyms
- Haplochromis macrostoma Regan, 1922; Cyrtocara macrostoma (Regan, 1922)

= Tyrannochromis macrostoma =

Species of fish

Tyrannochromis macrostoma, or big-mouth hap, is a species of cichlid endemic to Lake Malawi where it prefers rocky shallows. This species can reach a length of 30 centimetres (12 in) TL. It can also be found in the aquarium trade.

== See also ==
- List of freshwater aquarium fish species
