= Lethrinops longipinnis =

Conservation status
- Least Concern (IUCN 3.1)

Scientific classification
- Kingdom: Animalia
- Phylum: Chordata
- Class: Actinopterygii
- Order: Cichliformes
- Family: Cichlidae
- Genus: Lethrinops
- Species: L. longipinnis

Binomial name
- Lethrinops longipinnis Eccles & D. S. C. Lewis, 1978

Species of fish

Lethrinops longipinnis is a species of cichlid endemic to Lake Malawi where it is found at depths of 30 to 140 metres (98 to 459 ft) (usually only down to 70 metres (230 ft)) over sandy substrates. This species grows to a length of 16 centimetres (6.3 in) SL.
