= Nyassachromis purpurans =

Conservation status
- Least Concern (IUCN 3.1)

Scientific classification
- Kingdom: Animalia
- Phylum: Chordata
- Class: Actinopterygii
- Order: Cichliformes
- Family: Cichlidae
- Genus: Nyassachromis
- Species: N. purpurans

Binomial name
- Nyassachromis purpurans (Trewavas, 1935)

Synonyms
- Haplochromis purpurans Trewavas, 1935; Cyrtocara purpurans (Trewavas, 1935)

Species of fish

Nyassachromis purpurans is a species of cichlid endemic to Lake Malawi where it prefers areas with sandy substrates. This species can reach a length of 18 centimetres (7.1 in) TL. It can also be found in the aquarium trade.

Included in the group of open water mouthbrooders called "Utaka" by the native Malawians, the male is a light iridescent blue with ornate yellow fins tipped with a black stripe while the female is a drab silver-gray with yellow-tipped fins.
