= Tyrannochromis nigriventer =

Conservation status
- Least Concern (IUCN 3.1)

Scientific classification
- Kingdom: Animalia
- Phylum: Chordata
- Class: Actinopterygii
- Order: Cichliformes
- Family: Cichlidae
- Genus: Tyrannochromis
- Species: T. nigriventer

Binomial name
- Tyrannochromis nigriventer Eccles, 1989

Species of fish

Tyrannochromis nigriventer is a species of cichlid endemic to Lake Malawi where it prefers rocky shallows. This species can reach a length of 20–25 centimetres (7.9–9.8 in) SL.
