= Protomelas spilopterus =

Conservation status
- Least Concern (IUCN 3.1)

Scientific classification
- Kingdom: Animalia
- Phylum: Chordata
- Class: Actinopterygii
- Order: Cichliformes
- Family: Cichlidae
- Genus: Protomelas
- Species: P. spilopterus

Binomial name
- Protomelas spilopterus (Trewavas, 1935)

Synonyms
- Haplochromis spilopterus Trewavas, 1935; Cyrtocara spilopterus (Trewavas, 1935); Hemitaeniochromis spilopterus (Trewavas, 1935)

Species of fish

Protomelas spilopterus is a species of cichlid endemic to Lake Malawi. It is believed to be a specialist predator on fish fry. This species can reach a length of 24 centimetres (9.4 in) TL. It can also be found in the aquarium trade.
