= Docimodus evelynae =

Conservation status
- Least Concern (IUCN 3.1)

Scientific classification
- Kingdom: Animalia
- Phylum: Chordata
- Class: Actinopterygii
- Division: Teleostei
- Order: Cichliformes
- Family: Cichlidae
- Genus: Docimodus
- Species: D. evelynae

Binomial name
- Docimodus evelynae Eccles & D. S. C. Lewis, 1976

Species of fish

Docimodus evelynae is a species of haplochromine cichlid. It is endemic to Lake Malawi and isis widespread in the lake being found along the shores of Malawi, Mozambique, and Tanzania. This species has unusual feeding habits: it feeds upon the flank scales of cichlids or cyprinids and the skin of catfishes. The specific name honours Evelyn Axelrod, the wife of the publisher Herbert R. Axelrod (1927–2017).
