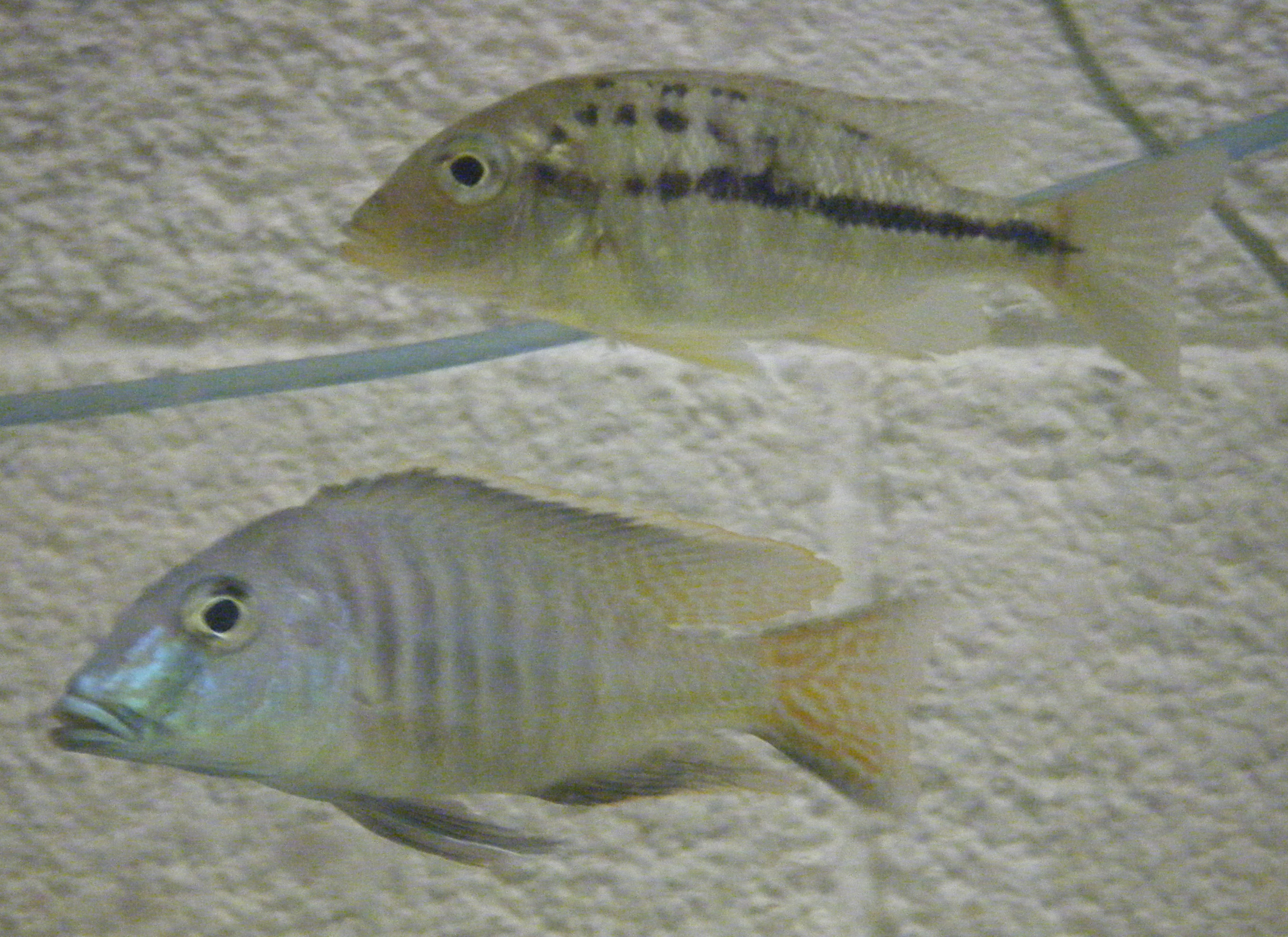
- male (below) and female (above)

Conservation status
- Least Concern (IUCN 3.1)

Scientific classification
- Kingdom: Animalia
- Phylum: Chordata
- Class: Actinopterygii
- Division: Teleostei
- Order: Cichliformes
- Family: Cichlidae
- Genus: Lethrinops
- Species: L. lethrinus

Binomial name
- Lethrinops lethrinus (Günther, 1894)

= Lethrinops lethrinus =

Species of fish

Lethrinops lethrinus is a species of cichlid native to Lake Malawi and western shore feeder streams, Lake Malombe, and the upper reaches of the Shire River. It prefers areas in the lakes that are near river outlets This species grows to a length of 20 centimetres (7.9 in) TL. It can also be found in the aquarium trade.
