= Lethrinops turneri =

Conservation status
- Least Concern (IUCN 3.1)

Scientific classification
- Kingdom: Animalia
- Phylum: Chordata
- Class: Actinopterygii
- Order: Cichliformes
- Family: Cichlidae
- Genus: Lethrinops
- Species: L. turneri

Binomial name
- Lethrinops turneri Ngatunga & Snoeks, 2003

Species of fish

Lethrinops turneri is a species of cichlid native to Lake Malawi and Lake Malombe. This species grows to a length of 9.4 centimetres (3.7 in) SL. The specific name honours the ichthyologist George F. Turner of Bangor University in Wales who worked on the fish and fisheries of Lakes Malawi and Malombe and who was the first to report this species in those waters.
