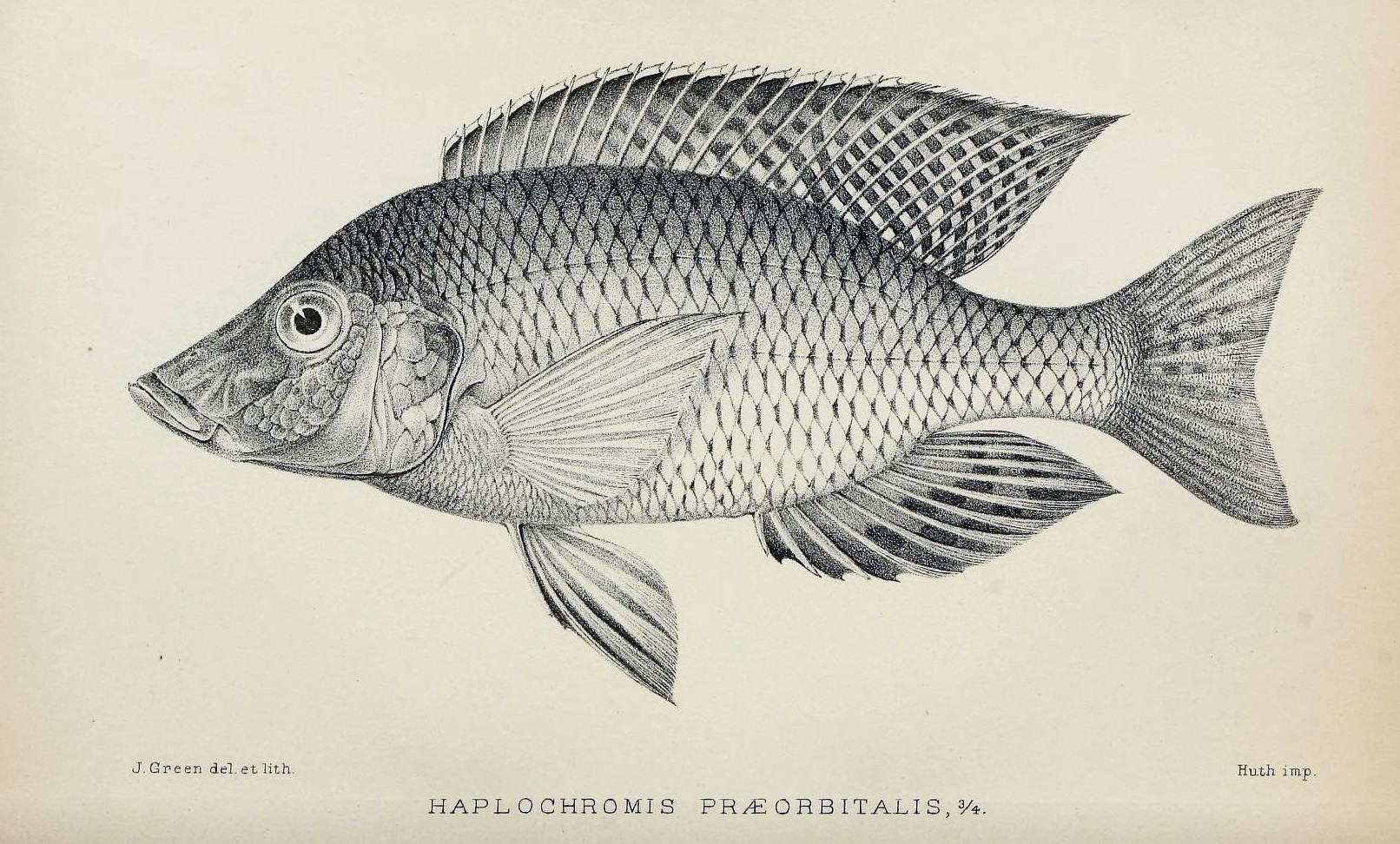
- Taeniolethrinops praeorbitalis

Scientific classification
- Kingdom: Animalia
- Phylum: Chordata
- Class: Actinopterygii
- Order: Cichliformes
- Family: Cichlidae
- Tribe: Haplochromini
- Genus: Taeniolethrinops; Eccles & Trewavas, 1989

Type species
- Haplochromis praeorbitalis Regan, 1922

= Taeniolethrinops =

Genus of fishes

Taeniolethrinops is a small genus of haplochromine cichlids endemic to Lake Malawi.

== Species ==
There are currently four recognized species in this genus:

- Taeniolethrinops cyrtonotus (Trewavas, 1931)
- Taeniolethrinops furcicauda (Trewavas, 1931)
- Taeniolethrinops laticeps (Trewavas, 1931)
- Taeniolethrinops praeorbitalis (Regan, 1922)
