= Eclectochromis lobochilus =

Conservation status
- Least Concern (IUCN 3.1)

Scientific classification
- Kingdom: Animalia
- Phylum: Chordata
- Class: Actinopterygii
- Order: Cichliformes
- Family: Cichlidae
- Genus: Eclectochromis
- Species: E. lobochilus

Binomial name
- Eclectochromis lobochilus (Trewavas, 1935)

Synonyms
- Haplochromis lobochilus Trewavas, 1935

Species of fish

Eclectochromis lobochilus is a species of fish in the family Cichlidae. It is found in Malawi, Mozambique, and Tanzania. Its endemic to Lake Malawi.

This species is found along rocky shores and sometimes in the intermediate habitat between sandy and rock areas. It occurs at depths of 5–15 metres (16–49 ft). It feeds on invertebrates, mainly adult and larval in insects, that hide among aquatic vegetation or algae. The breeding males defend a cave among the rocks. The females mouthbrood the eggs and fry, guarding them after they have been released. This species is known as "Haplochromis Hertae" in the aquarium trade.
