= Lethrinops marginatus =

Conservation status
- Least Concern (IUCN 3.1)

Scientific classification
- Kingdom: Animalia
- Phylum: Chordata
- Class: Actinopterygii
- Order: Cichliformes
- Family: Cichlidae
- Genus: Lethrinops
- Species: L. marginatus

Binomial name
- Lethrinops marginatus Ahl, 1926

Species of fish

Lethrinops marginatus, also known as the Lethrinops 'rounded head' in the aquarium fish trade, is a species of cichlid endemic to Lake Malawi where it is widespread and occurs in shallow waters over sandy substrates. This species grows to a length of 11 centimetres (4.3 in) SL.
