= Lethrinops albus =

Conservation status
- Least Concern (IUCN 3.1)

Scientific classification
- Kingdom: Animalia
- Phylum: Chordata
- Class: Actinopterygii
- Order: Cichliformes
- Family: Cichlidae
- Genus: Lethrinops
- Species: L. albus

Binomial name
- Lethrinops albus Regan, 1922

Species of fish

Lethrinops albus is a species of cichlid endemic to Lake Malawi where it occurs in deep waters. This species grows to a length of 16.5 centimetres (6.5 in) TL. It can also be found in the aquarium trade.
