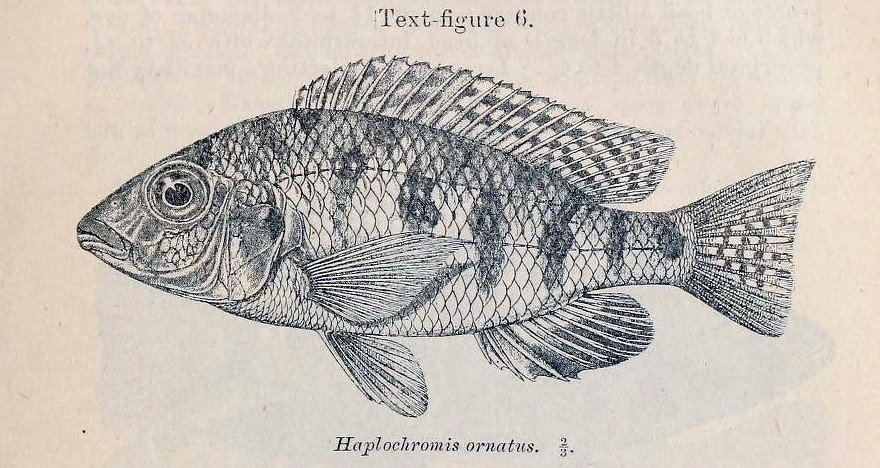
- Eclectochromis ornatus

Scientific classification
- Kingdom: Animalia
- Phylum: Chordata
- Class: Actinopterygii
- Order: Cichliformes
- Family: Cichlidae
- Tribe: Haplochromini
- Genus: Eclectochromis; Eccles & Trewavas, 1989

Type species
- Haplochromis ornatus Regan, 1922

= Eclectochromis =

Genus of fishes

Eclectochromis is a small genus of haplochromine cichlids endemic to Lake Malawi.

== Species ==
There are currently two recognized species in this genus:

- Eclectochromis lobochilus (Trewavas, 1935)
- Eclectochromis ornatus (Regan, 1922)
