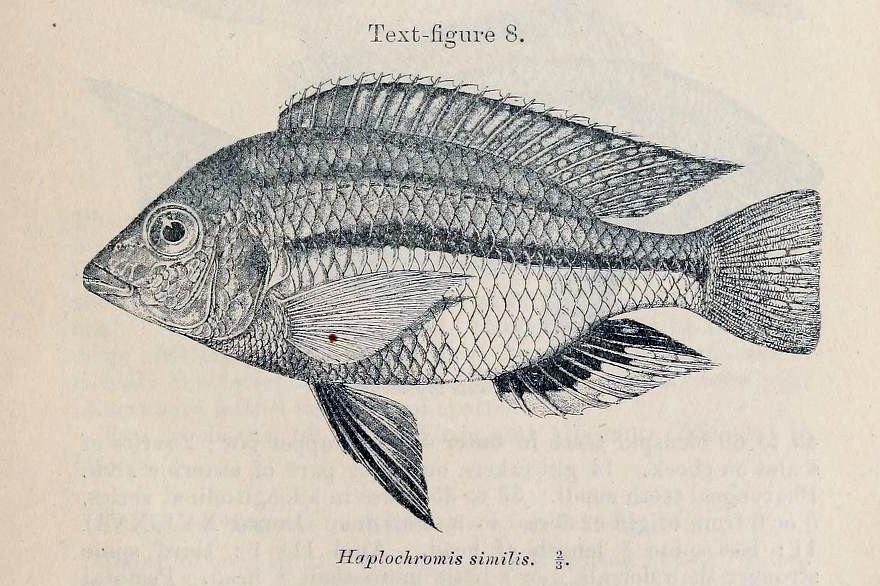

Conservation status
- Least Concern (IUCN 3.1)

Scientific classification
- Kingdom: Animalia
- Phylum: Chordata
- Class: Actinopterygii
- Order: Cichliformes
- Family: Cichlidae
- Genus: Protomelas
- Species: P. similis

Binomial name
- Protomelas similis (Regan, 1922)

Synonyms
- Haplochromis similis Regan, 1922; Cyrtocara similis (Regan, 1922)

= Protomelas similis =

Species of fish

Protomelas similis is a species of cichlid endemic to Lake Malawi where it prefers shallow waters with plentiful vegetation. This species can reach a length of 18 centimetres (7.1 in) TL. This species can also be found in the aquarium trade.
