= Protomelas labridens =

Conservation status
- Least Concern (IUCN 3.1)

Scientific classification
- Kingdom: Animalia
- Phylum: Chordata
- Class: Actinopterygii
- Order: Cichliformes
- Family: Cichlidae
- Genus: Protomelas
- Species: P. labridens

Binomial name
- Protomelas labridens (Trewavas, 1935)

Synonyms
- Haplochromis labridens Trewavas, 1935; Cyrtocara labridens (Trewavas, 1935)

Species of fish

Protomelas labridens is a species of cichlid endemic to Lake Malawi where it prefers shallow, vegetated waters. This species can reach a length of 18 centimetres (7.1 in) TL. It can also be found in the aquarium trade.
