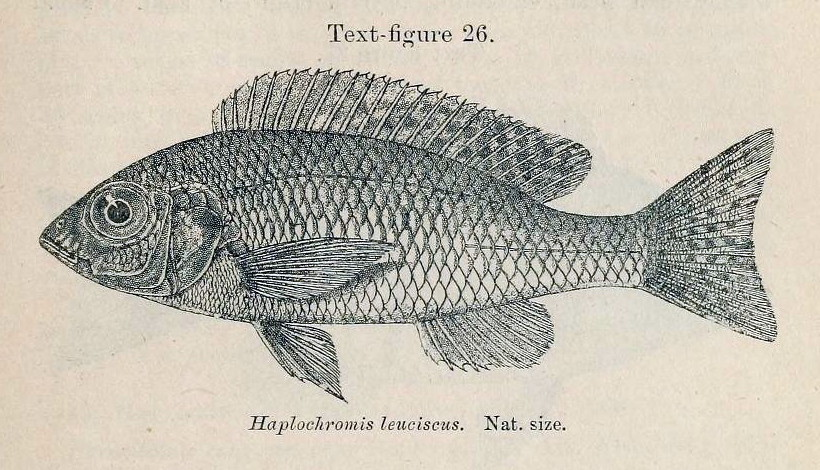

Conservation status
- Data Deficient (IUCN 3.1)

Scientific classification
- Kingdom: Animalia
- Phylum: Chordata
- Class: Actinopterygii
- Order: Cichliformes
- Family: Cichlidae
- Genus: Nyassachromis
- Species: N. leuciscus

Binomial name
- Nyassachromis leuciscus (Regan, 1922)

Synonyms
- Haplochromis leuciscus Regan, 1922; Cyrtocara leucisca (Regan, 1922); Cyrtocara leuciscus (Regan, 1922)

= Small green utaka =

Species of fish

The small green utaka (Nyassachromis leuciscus) is a species of cichlid endemic to Lake Malawi where it prefers areas with a sandy substrate. This species can reach a length of 16 centimetres (6.3 in) TL. It can also be found in the aquarium trade.
