= One-and-a-half-stripe hap =

Conservation status
- Least Concern (IUCN 3.1)

Scientific classification
- Kingdom: Animalia
- Phylum: Chordata
- Class: Actinopterygii
- Order: Cichliformes
- Family: Cichlidae
- Genus: Protomelas
- Species: P. insignis

Binomial name
- Protomelas insignis (Trewavas, 1935)

Synonyms
- Haplochromis insignis Trewavas, 1935; Cyrtocara insignis (Trewavas, 1935)

Species of fish

The one-and-a-half-stripe hap (Protomelas insignis) is a species of cichlid endemic to Lake Malawi where it prefers rocky areas. It is an egg-eater, seeking out and consuming the eggs of other fishes. This species can reach a length of 20.3 centimetres (8.0 in) TL. It can also be found in the aquarium trade.
