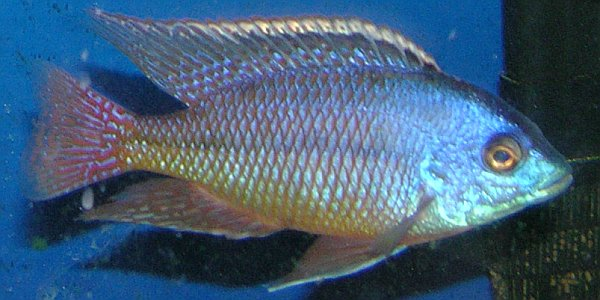

Conservation status
- Least Concern (IUCN 3.1)

Scientific classification
- Kingdom: Animalia
- Phylum: Chordata
- Class: Actinopterygii
- Order: Cichliformes
- Family: Cichlidae
- Genus: Protomelas
- Species: P. taeniolatus

Binomial name
- Protomelas taeniolatus (Trewavas, 1935)

Synonyms
- Haplochromis taeniolatus Trewavas, 1935; Cyrtocara taeniolata (Trewavas, 1935); Cyrtocara taeniolatus (Trewavas, 1935); Haplochromis cancellus Greenwood, 1963

= Protomelas taeniolatus =

Red empress

Species of fish

Protomelas taeniolatus (often sold under various trade names: Haplochromis red empress, red empress or spindle hap) is a Haplochromine cichlid endemic to Lake Malawi in Eastern Africa. The fish is popular in the aquarium hobby due to the bright rainbow-like colors of adult males and its relatively peaceful temperament. Juvenile and female P. taeniolatus, like many Haplochromines, do not display bright coloration.

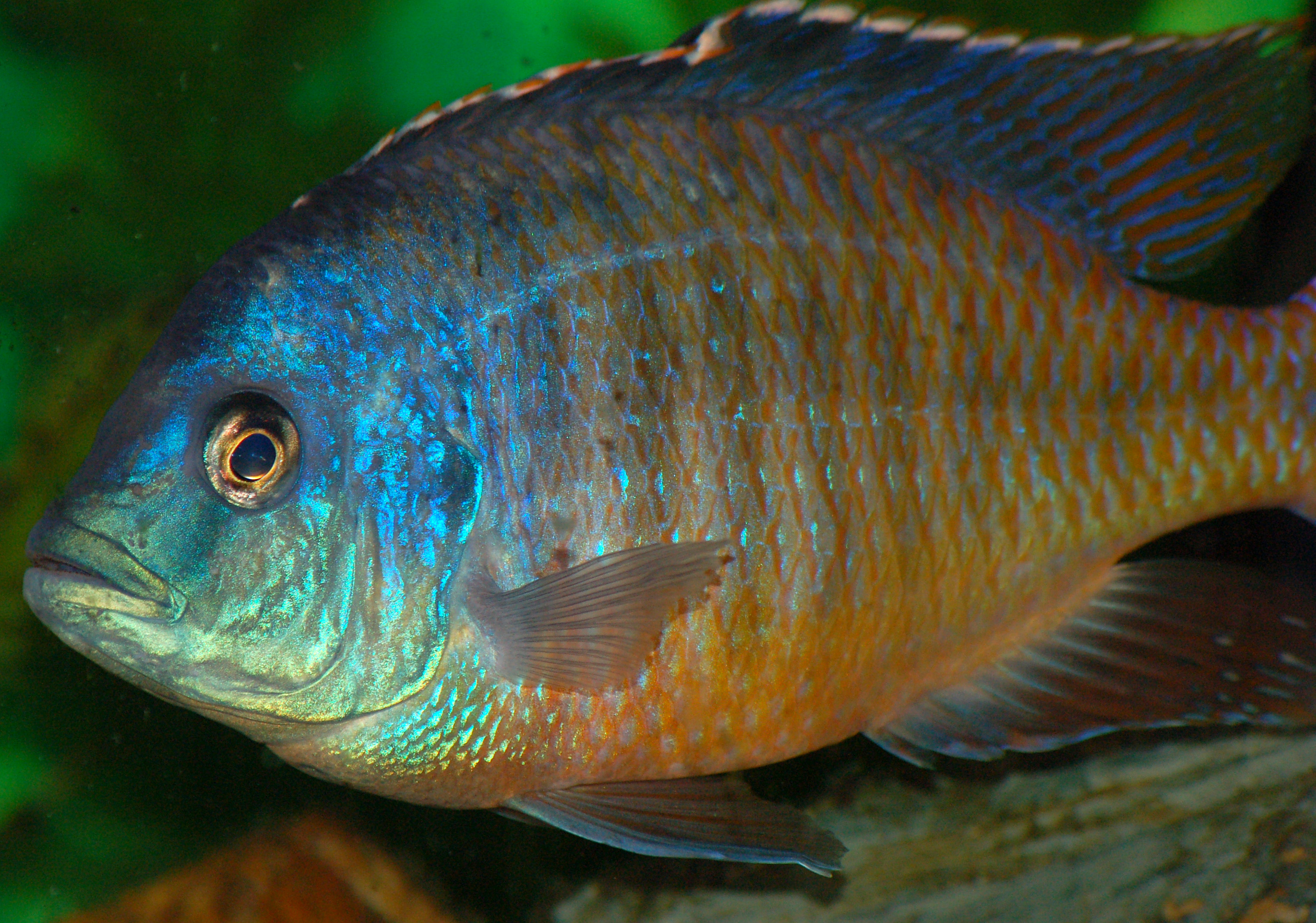

The red empress is endemic to Lake Malawi and occurs in sediment free, rocky habitats in relatively shallow waters. It mainly feeds on algae growing on the rock surfaces, but also on a variety of small invertebrates. Males can reach a size of up to 11.3 centimetres (4.4 in) TL.

== Fin Profile ==
The Red Emperor Cichlid has an impressive fin profile to help it survive in its natural habitat: its large body is bristling with spiny fins, which it uses to ward off predators and navigate the water. The anal, dorsal, pectoral, and caudal fins are long to help the fish move quickly through the water. Moreover, the front of each fin is made softer to compatible with water dynamics to gain maximum speeds.

== Home Aquarium ==
Due to the attractive colors of the male, these fish are used in the freshwater home aquarium to add variety and color. When kept in captivity they usually grow to around 15 cm (6 inches) and it is recommended that it be kept in at least a 55-gallon tank. They prefer a pH level of 8.2 and a temperature of 26-28 °C (82.4 °F).

== Territory ==
The Protomelas taeniolatus is generally a peaceful fish until breeding time. At this time the male will guard quite a large amount of territory and chase away any fish that enters his 'lair'. The males are mostly aggressive to each other unless in a large area of water. When the breeding time is over he will, again, allow any fish to enter his territory and will not guard it.

== See also ==
- List of freshwater aquarium fish species
