= David Henry Eccles =

David H. Eccles
- Born: David Henry Eccles; 7 August 1932
- Died: 7 December 2021 (aged 89); South Australia, Australia
- Education: Merton College
- Known for: Taxonomy of Lake Malawi cichlids
- Scientific career
- Fields: Ichthyology

David Henry Eccles, often written as David H. Eccles (7 August 1932 – 7 December 2021) was a South African ichthyologist who specialised in the cichlid fishes of Lake Malawi.

== Taxa named in his honour ==
- Diplotaxodon ecclesi Burgess & Axelrod, 1973
- Placidochromis ecclesi Hanssens, 2004

== Selected taxa described ==
The following is a selection of taxa described by Eccles, either independently or jointly with other ichthyologists:

- Aulonocara guentheri Eccles, 1989
- Buccochromis Eccles & Trewavas, 1989
- Caprichromis Eccles & Trewavas, 1989
- Cheilochromis Eccles & Trewavas, 1989
- Copadichromis Eccles & Trewavas, 1989
- Ctenopharynx Eccles & Trewavas, 1989
- Dimidiochromis Eccles & Trewavas, 1989
- Docimodus evelynae Eccles & Lewis, 1976
- Eclectochromis Eccles & Trewavas, 1989
- Exochochromis Eccles & Trewavas, 1989
- Fossorochromis Eccles & Trewavas, 1989
- Hemitaeniochromis Eccles & Trewavas, 1989
- Lethrinops longipinnis Eccles & Lewis, 1979
- Lethrinops microdon Eccles & Lewis, 1979
- Lethrinops mylodon Eccles & Lewis, 1979
- Lethrinops stridei Eccles & Lewis, 1979
- Maravichromis Eccles & Trewavas, 1989
- Melanochromis simulans Eccles, 1973
- Naevochromis Eccles & Trewavas, 1989
- Nimbochromis Eccles & Trewavas, 1989
- Nyassachromis Eccles & Trewavas, 1989
- Placidochromis Eccles & Trewavas, 1989
- Protomelas macrodon Eccles, 1989
- Protomelas Eccles & Trewavas, 1989
- Pseudotropheus johannii Eccles, 1973
- Sciaenochromis Eccles & Trewavas, 1989
- Stigmatochromis Eccles & Trewavas, 1989
- Taeniochromis Eccles & Trewavas, 1989
- Taeniolethrinops Eccles & Trewavas, 1989
- Tramitichromis Eccles & Trewavas, 1989
- Tyrannochromis nigriventer Eccles, 1989
- Tyrannochromis Eccles & Trewavas, 1989
