= Haplochromis mbipi =

Conservation status
- Least Concern (IUCN 3.1)

Scientific classification
- Kingdom: Animalia
- Phylum: Chordata
- Class: Actinopterygii
- Order: Cichliformes
- Family: Cichlidae
- Genus: Haplochromis
- Species: H. mbipi

Binomial name
- Haplochromis mbipi (Lippitsch & Bouton, 1998)

Synonyms
- Mbipia mbipi Lippitsch & Bouton, 1998

Species of fish

Haplochromis mbipi is a species of cichlid endemic to Lake Victoria where it is known from the southeastern portion of the lake. This shallow water species, 0 to 6 metres (0 to 20 ft), is generally found along gently sloping rocky shores. This species can reach a length of 13.1 centimetres (5.2 in) SL. This species was originally described in the genus Mbipia, however not all scientists have accepted such placement. It may be placed back in Mbipia should a comprehensive review of the genus Haplochromis be conducted.
