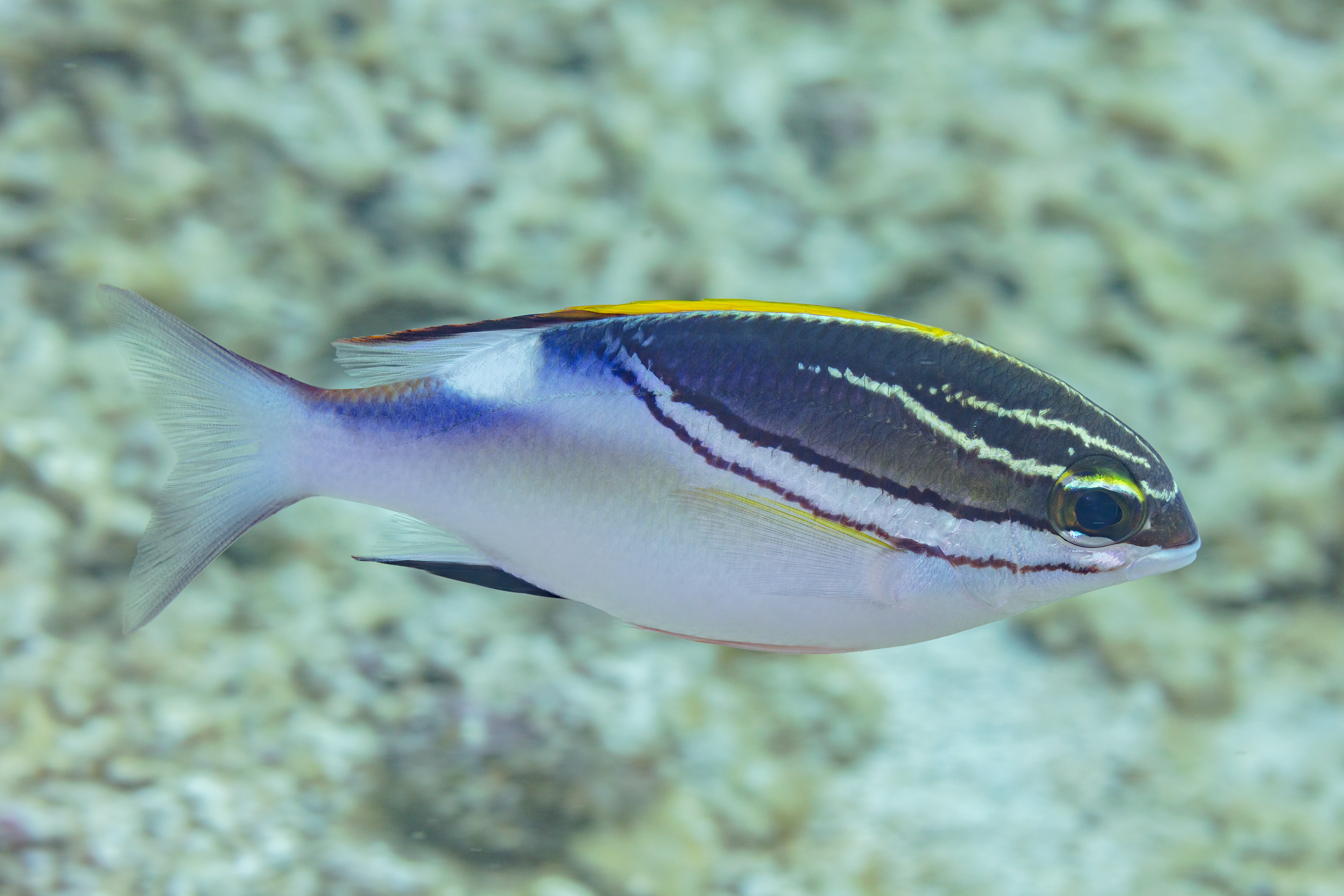
- Western Pacific
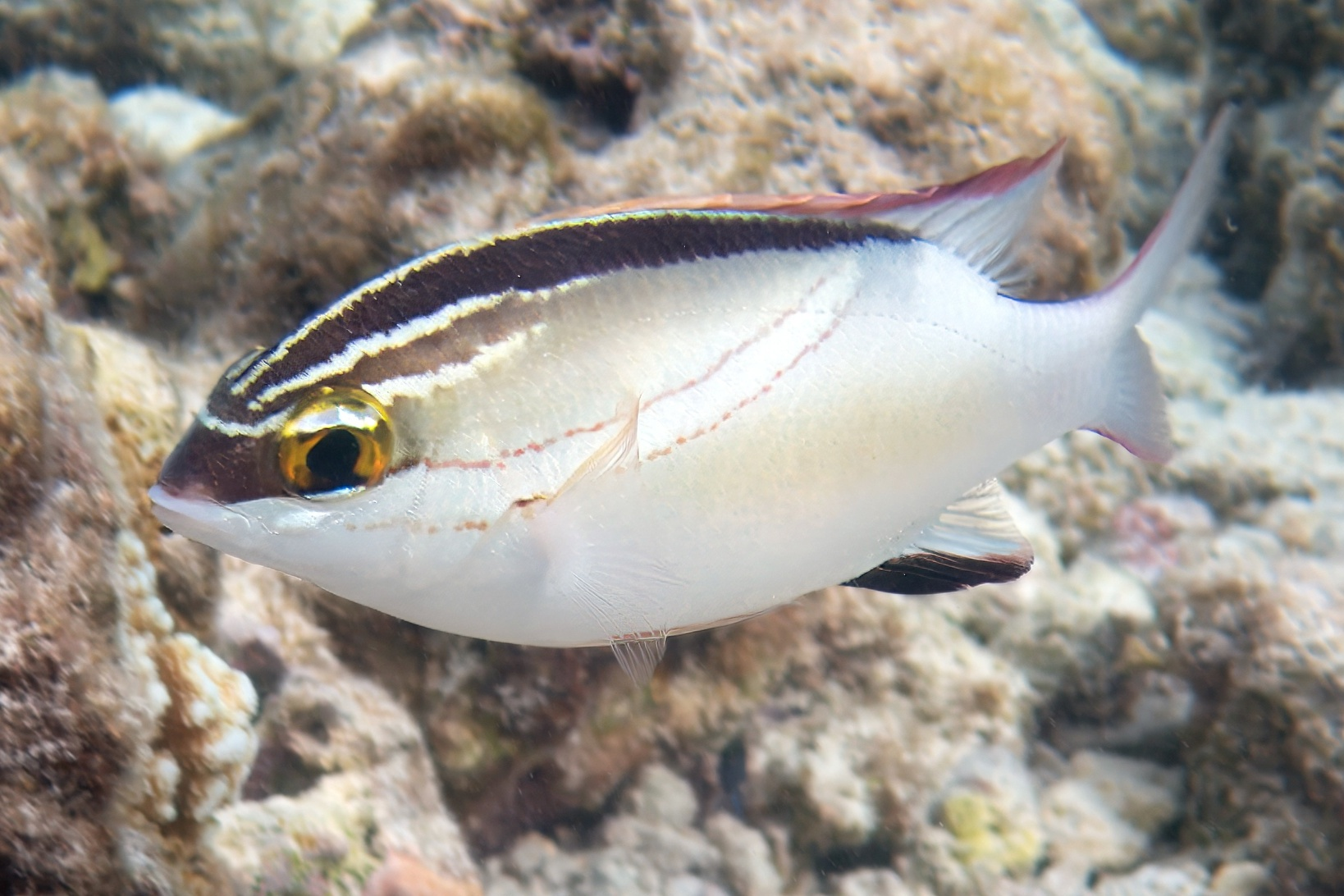
- Indian Ocean

Conservation status
- Least Concern (IUCN 3.1)

Scientific classification
- Kingdom: Animalia
- Phylum: Chordata
- Class: Actinopterygii
- Division: Teleostei
- Order: Acanthuriformes
- Family: Nemipteridae
- Genus: Scolopsis
- Species: S. bilineata

Binomial name
- Scolopsis bilineata (Bloch, 1793)

Synonyms
- Anthias bilineatus Bloch, 1793; Lutjanus ellipticus Lacépède, 1802; Scolopsis bleekeri Günther, 1859; Perca frenata Günther, 1859

= Scolopsis bilineata =

Two-lined monocle bream

Species of fish

Scolopsis bilineata, the two-lined monocle bream, bridled monocle bream, bridled spinecheek, double-lined coral bream or yellow-finned spine-cheek, is a species of marine ray-finned fish belonging to the family Nemipteridae, the threadfin breams. This species is found in the Indian and western Pacific Oceans.

== Taxonomy ==
Scolopsis bilineata was first formally described as Anthias bilineatus by the German physician and naturalist Marcus Elieser Bloch in 1793; the type locality was given as Japan.

== Etymology ==
The specific name bilineata is Latin for "two lined"; it is a reference to the two curved, parallel dark stripes on the head of adults.

== Distribution and habitat ==
Scolopsis bilineata is found in the eastern Indian Ocean and the western Pacific Ocean. It ranges from the Maldives and Sri Lanka in the west to Fiji, the Caroline Islands and Tonga in the east. Its range extends north to the Ryukyu Islands and south to Australia. Its Australian range extends from the Houtman Abrolhos in Western Australia along the western, northern and eastern coasts as far as Sydney. It has also been recorded from the Rowley Shoals and Scott Reef off Western Australia, the Ashmore Reef in the Timor Sea, Christmas Island, Cocos (Keeling) Islands, Elizabeth and Middleton Reefs Marine National Park Reserve and Lord Howe Island.

It is found at depths between 1 and 25 m (3 ft 3 in and 82 ft 0 in) on coral reefs, with the juveniles being found inshore, in lagoons or in areas of rubble.

== Description ==
The dorsal fin of Scolopsis bilineata is supported by 10 spines and 7 soft rays while the anal fin contains 3 spines and 7 soft rays. The standard length is 2.5 to 3 times the body depth, and the length of the snout is less than the diameter of the eye. The pelvic fins are long, extending to or nearly to the level of the origin of the anal fin. The caudal fin is forked. There is a black-margined white stripe that arcs upwards from underneath the eye to the center of the dorsal-fin base, as well as a pair of white lines over and to the rear of the eyes. The spiny part of the dorsal fin is yellow, and there is a white area on the back underneath the soft-rayed part of the dorsal fin.

In juveniles, the upper half of the body is black with two yellow stripes, and the middle of the flanks has a wide poorly defined white stripe. Additionally, there is a prominent black mark on the dorsal fin.

This species has a maximum published total length of 25 cm (9.8 in), although 13 cm (5.1 in) standard length is more typical.

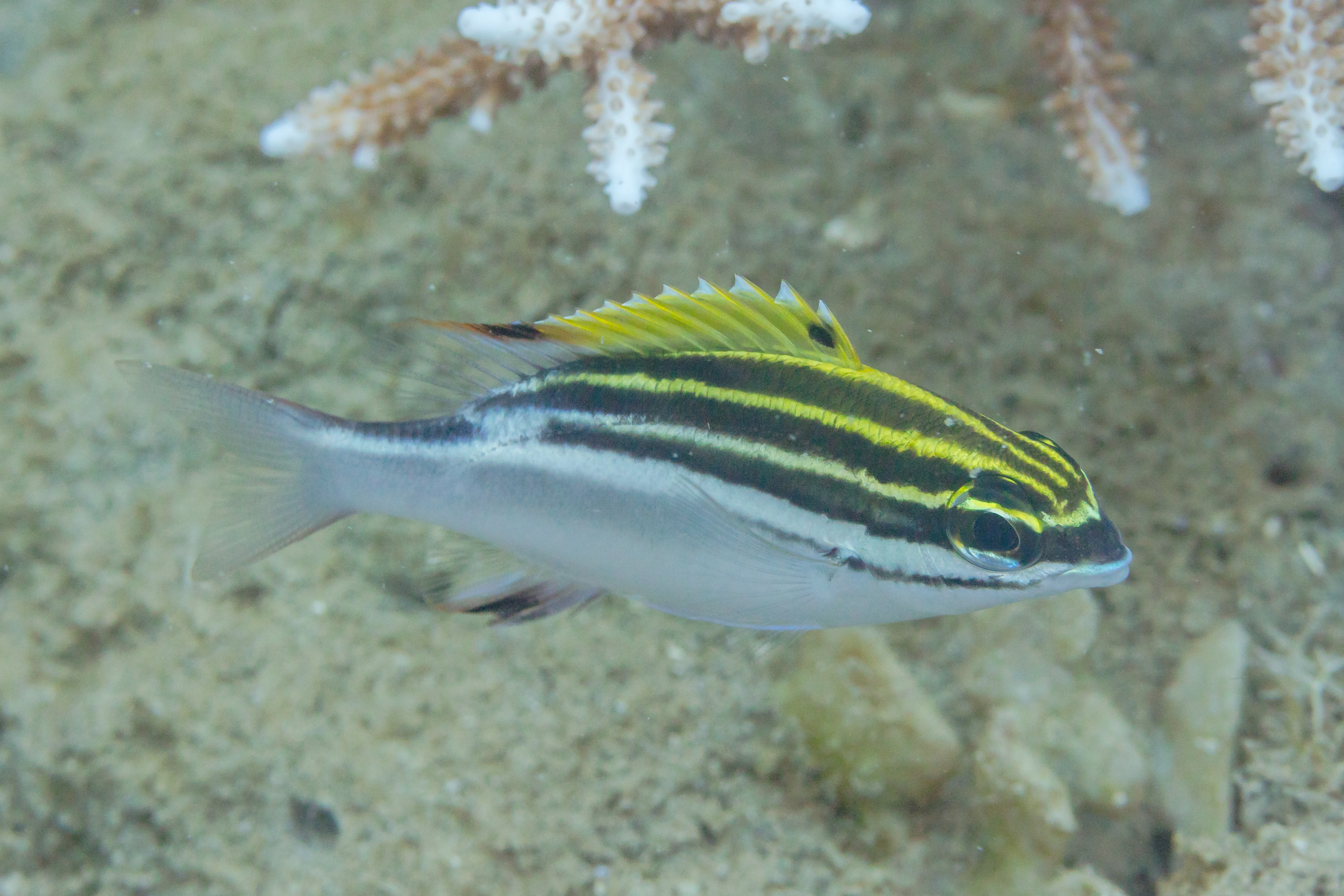
Juvenile, in the Philippines

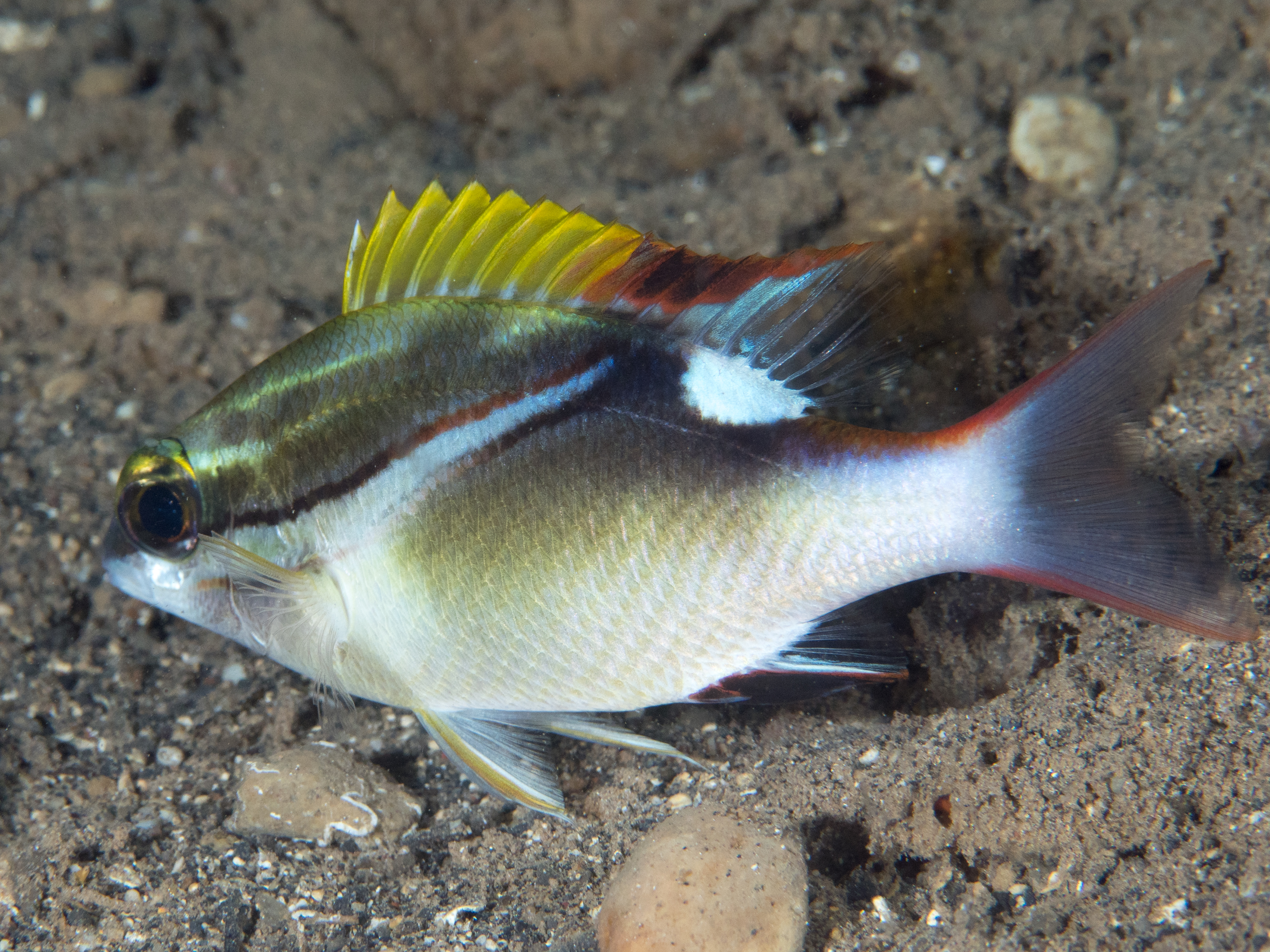
Showing dorsal fin, in Indonesia

== Biology ==
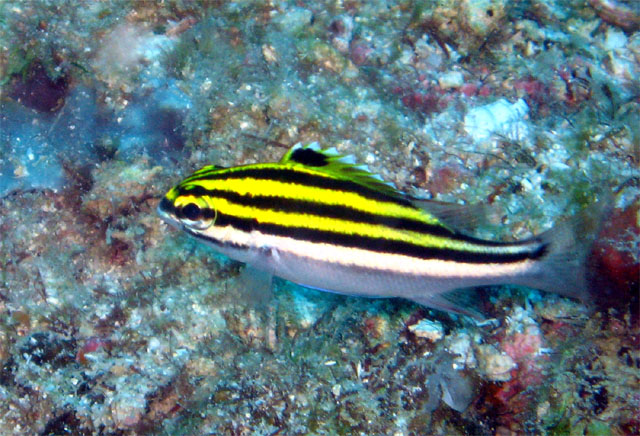
Juvenile in West Malaysia

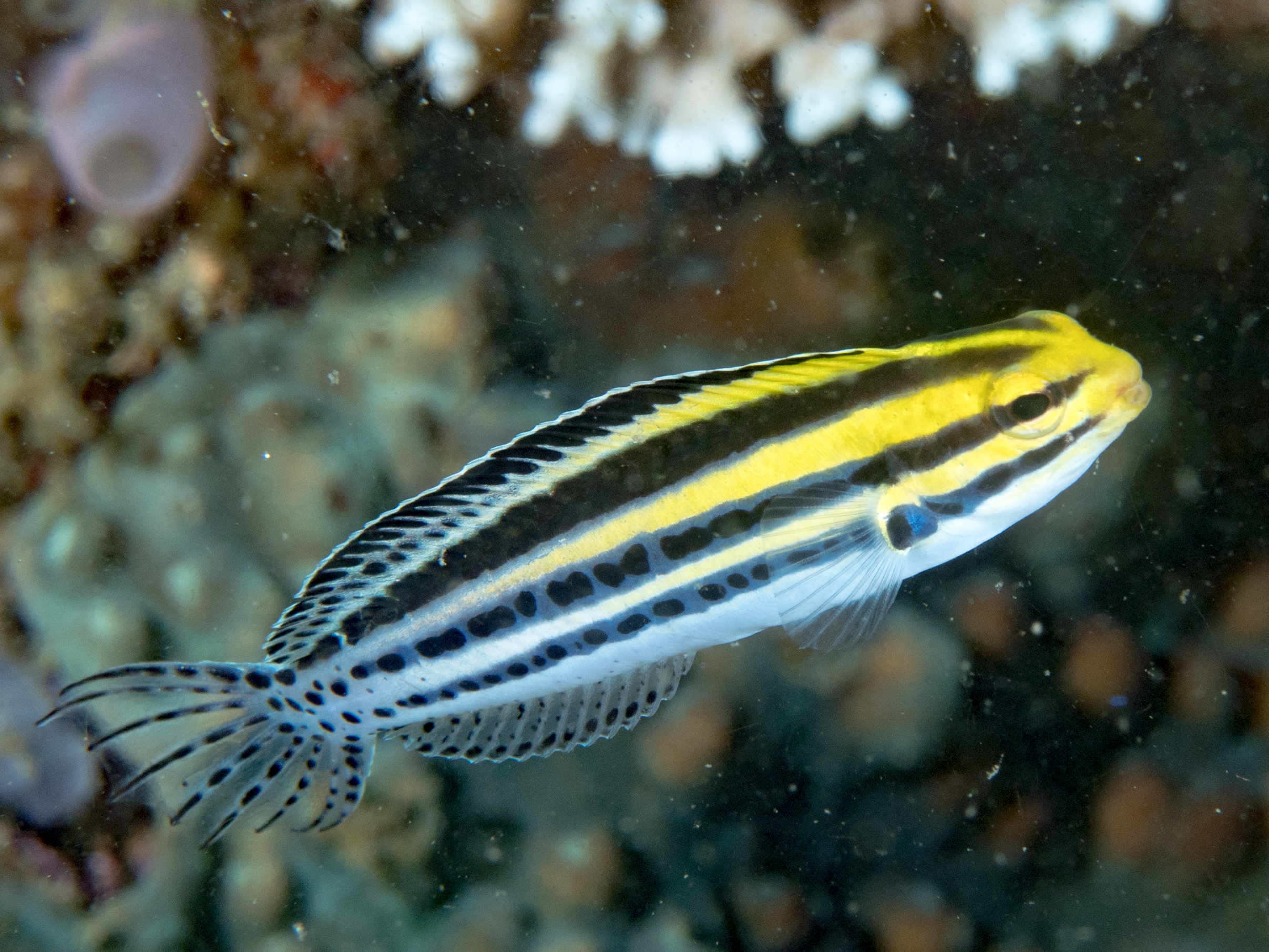
Striped fangblenny (Meiacanthus grammistes)

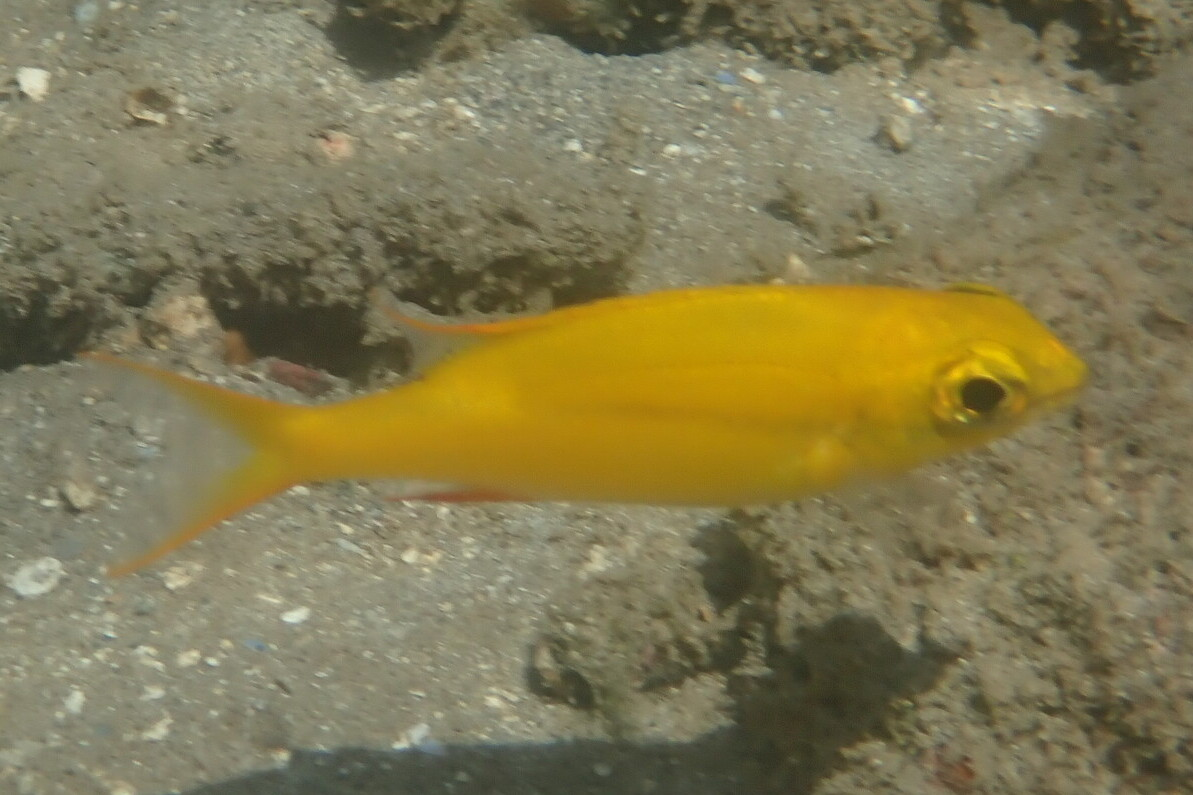
Juvenile in Fiji

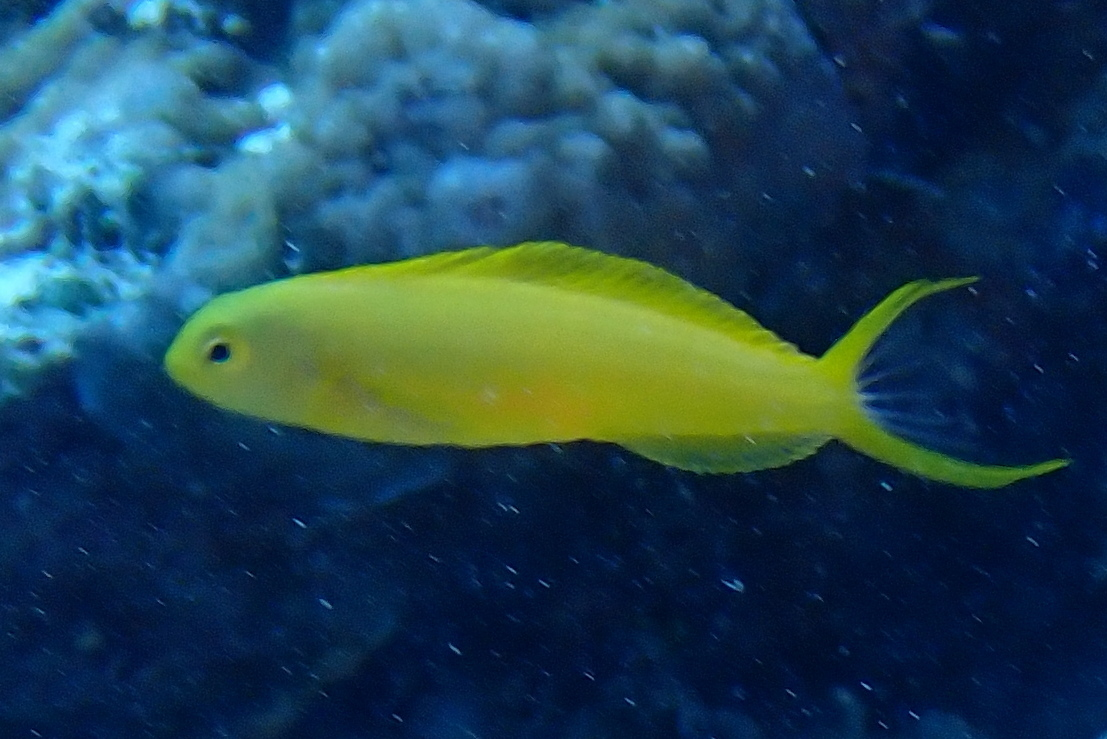
Canary fangblenny (Meiacanthus oualanensis)

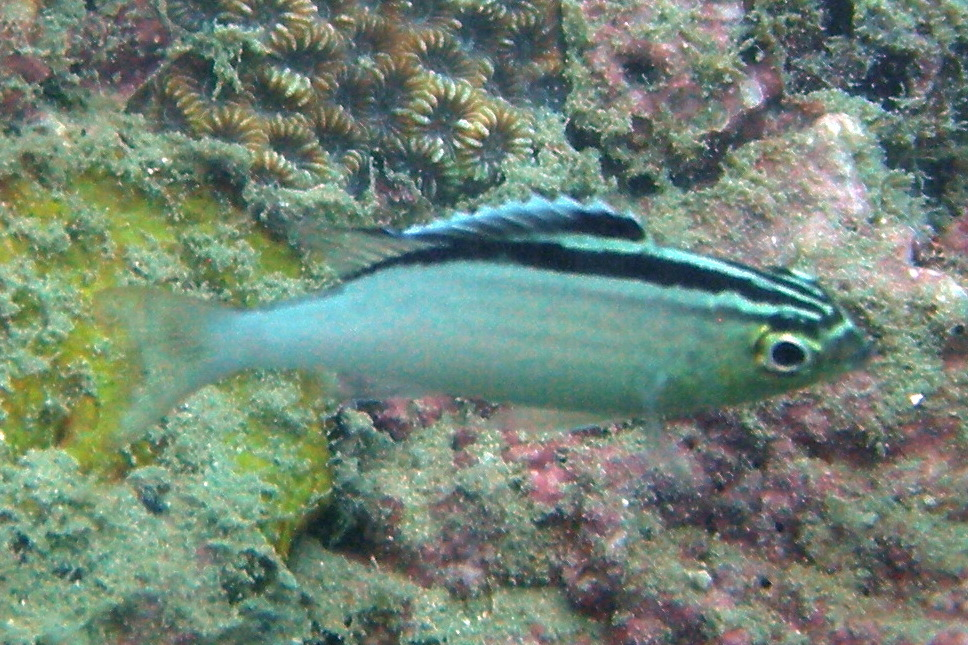
Juvenile in Thailand

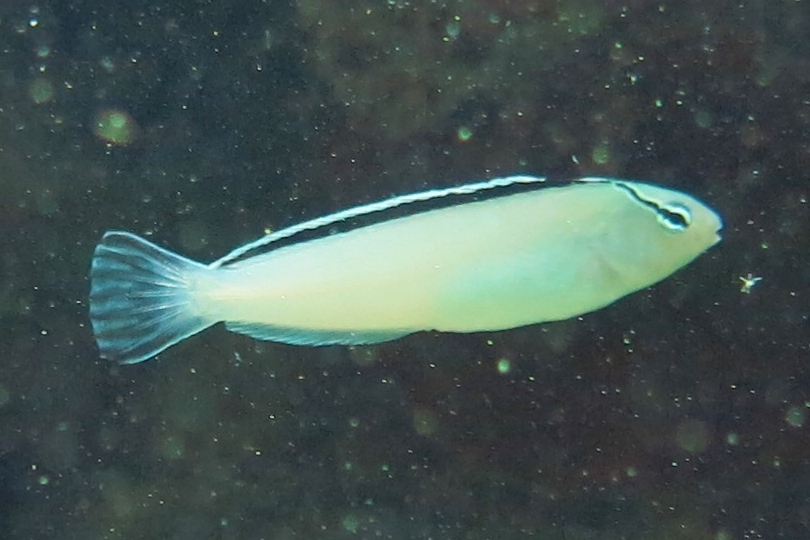
Smith's fangblenny (Meiacanthus smithi)

=== Mimicry ===
The juveniles are Batesian mimics of fangblennies, which are armed with venomous fangs; the bream and the fangblennies are similar in both colouration and swimming behaviour. In most of the western Pacific, the juveniles are black and yellow, mimicking the linespot fangblenny (Meiacanthus grammistes). In Fiji, juveniles are fully yellow, and enter a mimetic trio with the Canary fangblenny (Meiacanthus oualanensis) and the yellow Fijian form of the bicolor fangblenny (Plagiotremus laudandus). In the Indian Ocean, juveniles enter another mimetic trio with Smith's fangblenny (Meiacanthus smithi) and the imposter fangblenny (Plagiotremus phenax).

=== Reproduction ===
Scolopsis bilineata is found typically solitarily or in pairs, although it frequently gathers in small groups. Its prey is mainly benthic invertebrates and smaller fishes. It is a protogynous hermaphrodite, but there is no evidence that this is functional, and the sex change occur prior to sexual maturation.

=== Biofluorescence ===
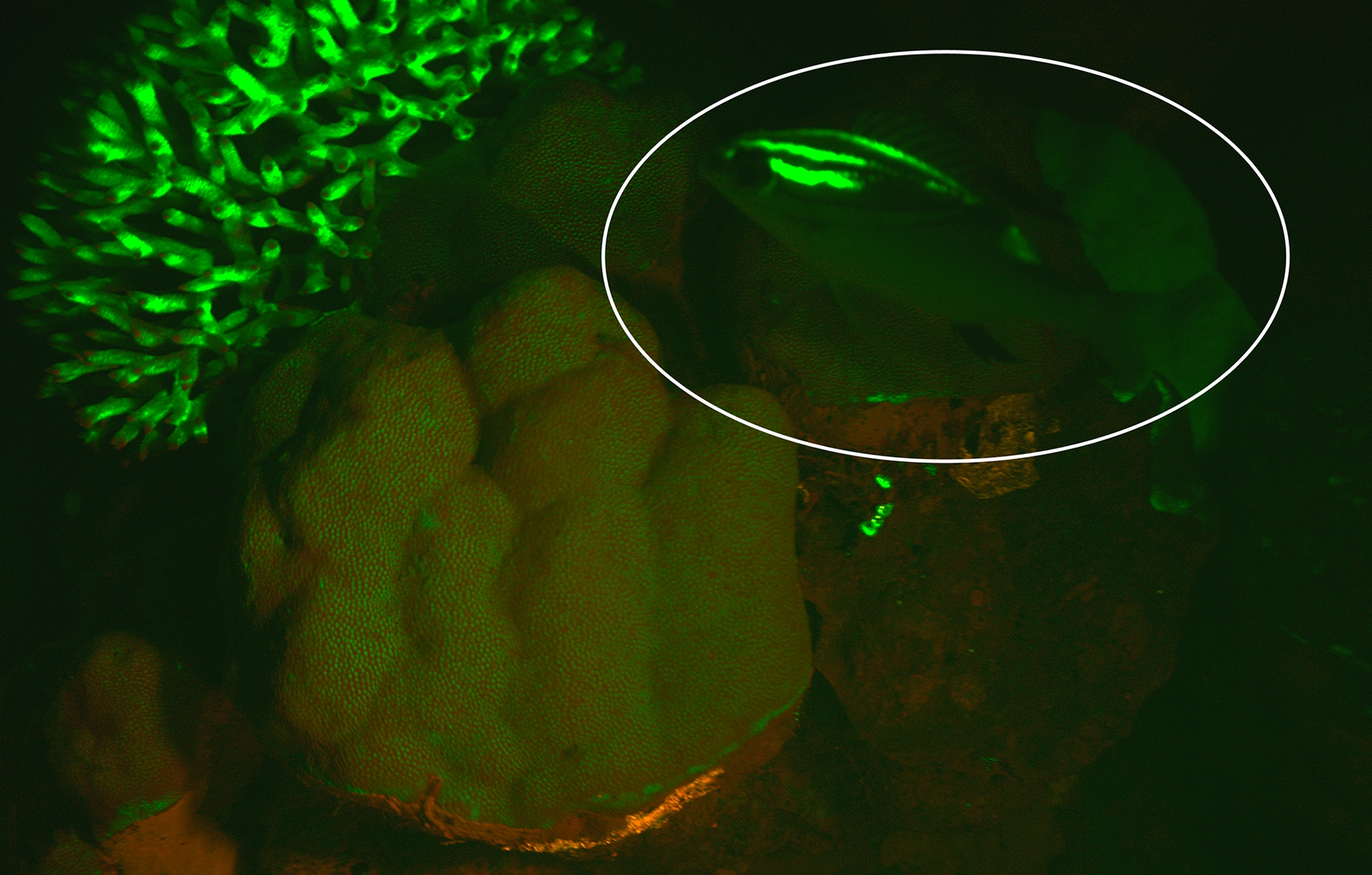
Biofluorescence at night, at the Solomon Islands

The two-lined monocle bream exhibits biofluorescence, that is, when illuminated by blue or ultraviolet light, it re-emits it as green, and appears differently than under white light illumination (only stripes on the upper front part are visible). Biofluorescence may assist in intraspecific communication and camouflage, blending the fish with green-fluorescing Acropora corals.

== Relationship with humans ==
Scolpsis bilineata is occasionally found in small numbers in fish markets and there is no fishery specifically targeting this species. In the Philippines, this species is caught to be sold in the aquarium trade.
