= Fish coloration =

Subset of animal coloration

Fish coloration, a subset of animal coloration, is extremely diverse. Fish across all taxa vary greatly in their coloration through special mechanisms, mainly pigment cells called chromatophores. Fish can have any colors of the visual spectrum on their skin, evolutionarily derived for many reasons. There are three factors to coloration, brightness (intensity of light), hue (mixtures of wavelengths), and saturation (the purity of wavelengths). Fish coloration has three proposed functions: thermoregulation, intraspecific communication, and interspecific communication. Fishes' diverse coloration is possibly derivative of the fact that "fish most likely see colors very differently than humans".

== Mechanisms ==
Close-up of fish melanophores.

Fish coloration is produced through specialized cells called chromatophores. The dermal chromatophore is a basic color unit in amphibians, reptiles, and fish which has three cell layers: "the xanthophore (contains carotenoid and pteridine pigments), the iridophore (reflects color structurally), and the melanophore (contains melanin)". The pigments in the chromatophores are generally classified into two groups: melanin (makes browns, grays, and blacks), and carotenoids (makes reds, oranges, and yellows). Xanthophores, iridophores, and melanophores "originate from neural crest‐derived stem cells associated with the dorsal root ganglia of the peripheral nervous system".

=== Specific mechanisms by color ===
- Black: produced by melanin granules dispersing inside the melanophore
- Gray and brown: produced by melanin granules concentrating inside the melanophore
- White: appears from light reflected by crystals of guanine in iridophores and leucophores
- Red, orange, yellow: produced by carotenoids that come from fish's diet
- Green, blue, violet: (generally) structural colors produced by the reflection and refraction of light by the skin and scale layers

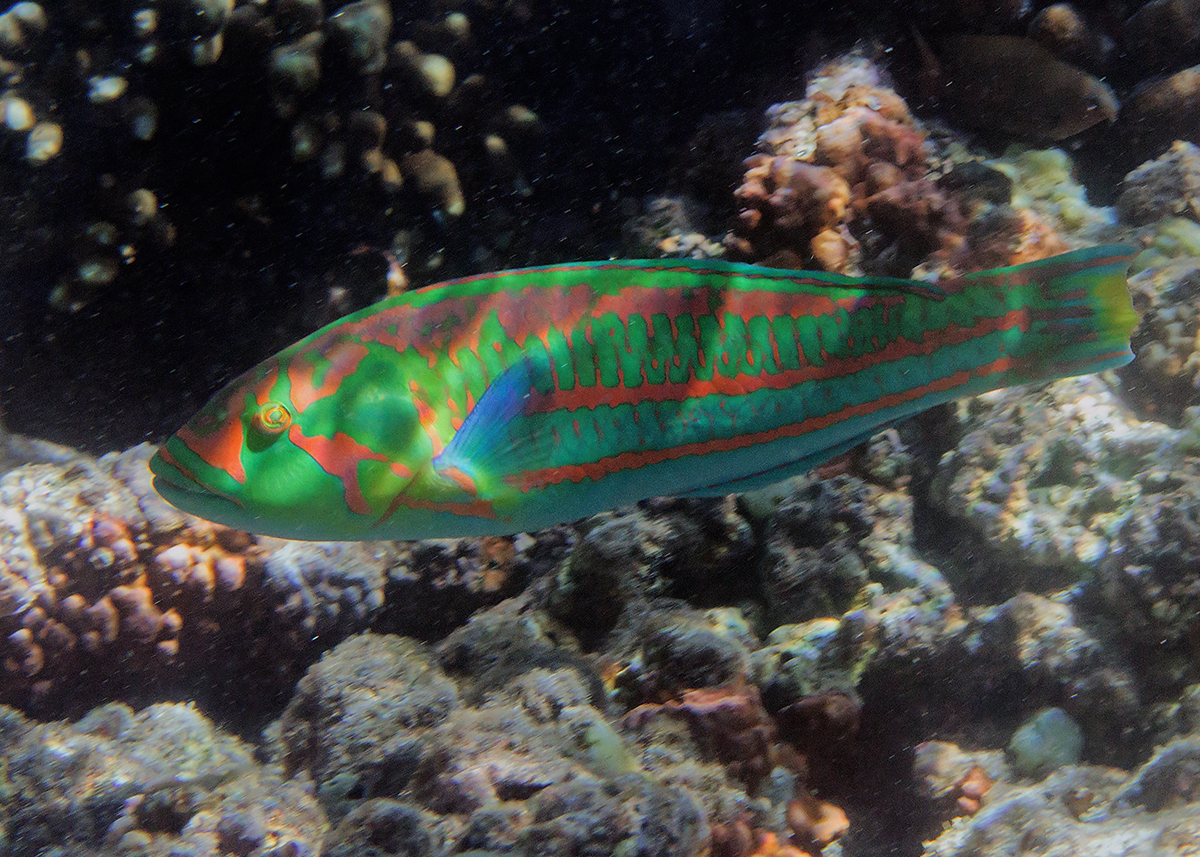
Thalassoma purpureum, of the family Labridae showing bright and varied coloration.

An example of a family of fish that is widely known for their highly varied and bright coloration are the Labridae (wrasses) and Scaridae (parrotfish). These fishes are known to possess all of the above pigments in different ratios depending on where they live in relation to the coral reef environment. Different wavelengths, and thus different colors, travel differently and therefore appear differently depending on the depth of the water and the things on which they are reflecting.

=== Color change ===
Color change in fishes can be roughly divided into two categories: physiological color change and morphological color change. Physiological color change is considered to be more rapid and consist of motile chromatophore responses, while morphological color change consists of the density and morphology of chromatophores changing. Overall, morphological color changes are considered to be a "physiological phenomena involved in the balance between differentiation [of melanophores] and apoptosis of chromatophores" but are still being studied; that is to say it has to do with the synthesis of pigment. The genetic factors behind natural morph variants of color in fish are still mostly undiscovered. Some hormonal factors of morphological color change in fish include α-MSH, prolactin, estrogen, noradrenaline, MCH, and possibly melatonin. Some of these are also involved in physiological color change. In physiological color change, there is also neurohumoral regulation of chromatophores in fish. Additionally, there have been found to be "differences at the intracellular level where fish chromatophores show smaller, better coordinated, and higher speed of the pigment organelles" in comparison to color-changing frogs.

An example of physiological color change is found in the black-spotted rockskipper (Entomacrodus striatus). They are known to change color rapidly using their chromatophores, which is thought to enhance their crypsis in the "high-contrast environment of the rock wall". Another example of physiological color change is in the body and the eyes of guppy juveniles and Nile tilapia. An example of morphological color change is in the Midas cichlid (Amphilophus citrinellus), that has "normal" and "gold" polymorphisms. Most of these cichlids maintain a "normal" grayish color pattern from juvenile to adult. However some of these species undergo morphological color change over their lifetimes, growing to be a gold or white color pattern as an adult. Another example of a fish that undergo morphological color change is the Hyphessobrycon myrmex sp. nov.. Juveniles are pale yellow and females maintain that color as adults. Males undergo morphological color change and become red or orange

== Evolutionary function ==
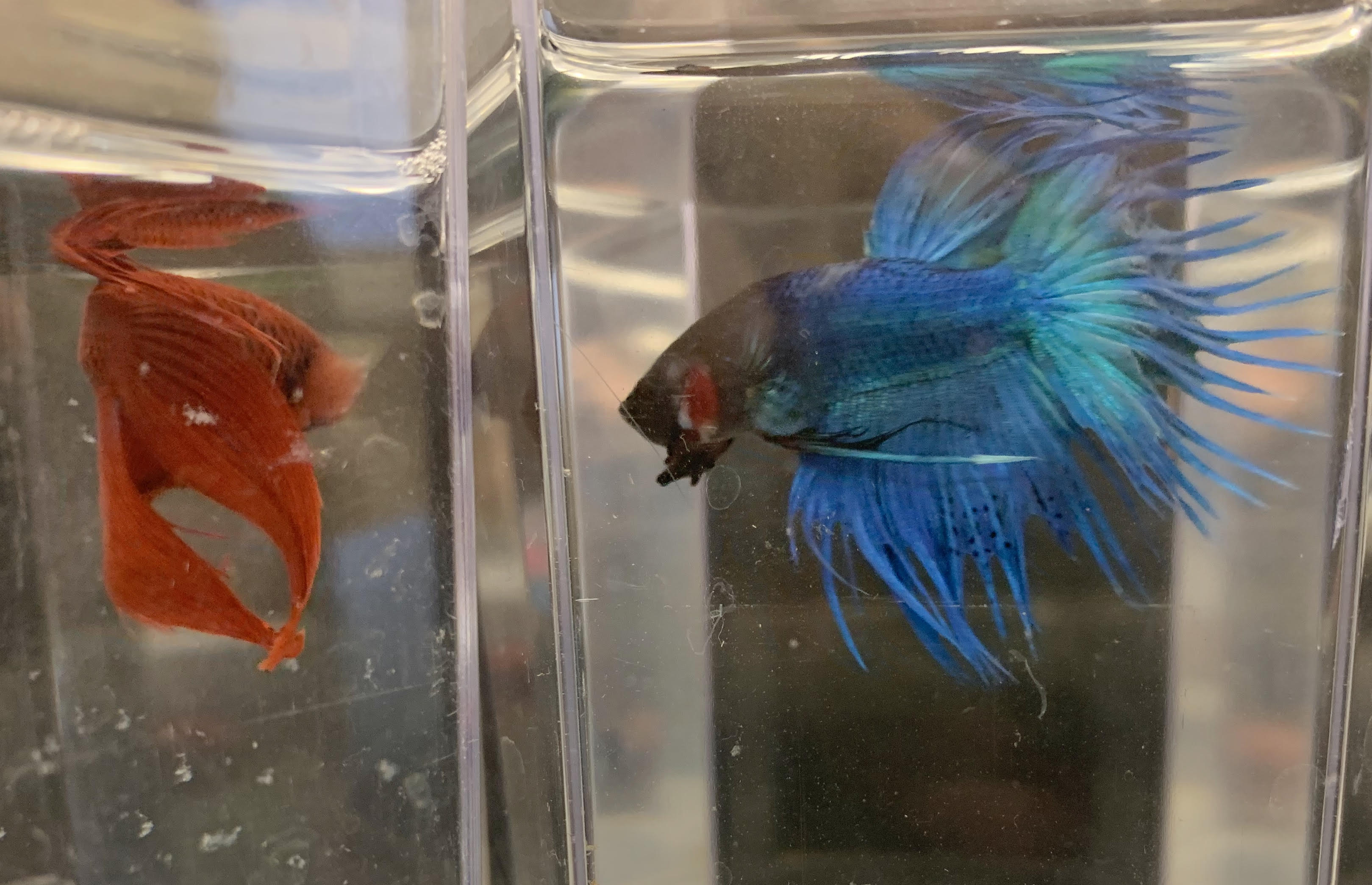
Ex. of dynamic display in a blue Betta splendens flaring its gills in an aggressive display to show the bright red coloration inside.

=== Signalling ===
One way that fish coloration can be categorized is into "static" or "dynamic" coloration/displays. Static coloration often serves as an "identification badge" for information such as species, reproductive condition, sex, or age. An example of a type of static coloration that conveys clear information to predators of different species is aposematic coloration. An example of aposematic coloration is in the lionfish (Pterois sp.). Dynamic displays consist of either changes of color or "rapid exposure of colored, previously hidden structures" such as colored fins that can be erected at will, colored mouth opening and closing, or flaring gills with bright coloration on the gill margins. For example, grunts have a bright red lining on their mouth that they can show by opening it in a head-to-head encounter. Another common example is the betta fish, or Siamese fighting fish, that will flare its gills as an aggressive behavior. These gills have brightly colored margins that contrast the rest of the body.

=== Camouflage ===
Some fish are famous for their camouflage, and it comes in many forms. Camouflage is when a fish is trying to blend in with its background, or not look obvious. Some major forms of camouflage in fish include protective resemblance, disruptive coloration, countershading, mirror-siding, and transparency.

=== Protective resemblance ===
Protective resemblance is blending in, or resembling an object that is not of interest to a predator and is thus inconspicuous. One example is the juvenile Platax orbicularis that resembles a leaf floating in the water. Another example is the Hippocampus bargibanti that resembles the coral it hooks to.

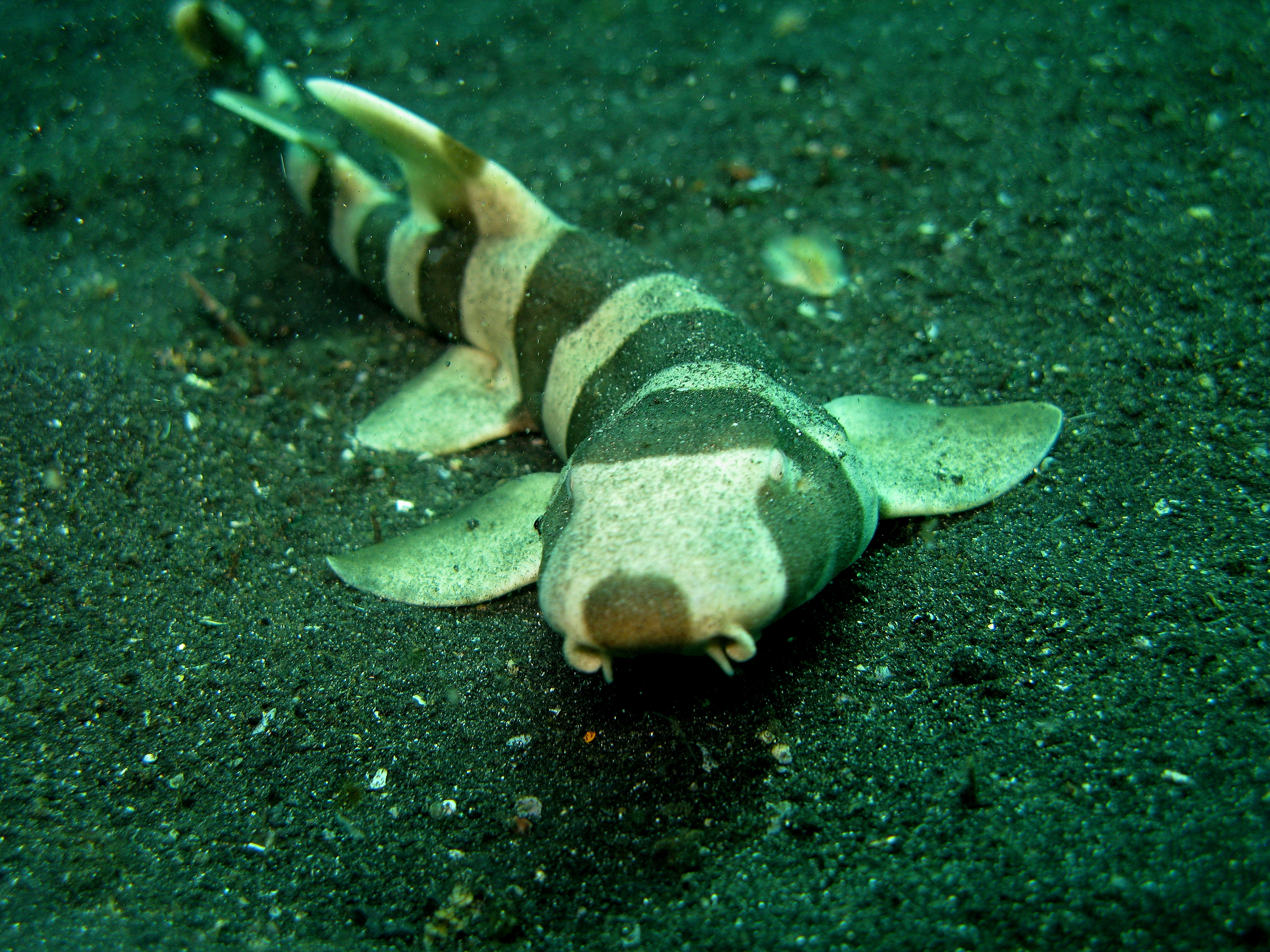
Ex. of disruptive coloration in the Bamboo Shark (Chiloscyllium punctatum).

=== Disruptive coloration ===
Disruptive coloration in fish functions to break up the fishlike outline. This can be done with stripes, bars, or spot patterns on the fish. Bars are lines that go dorsal to ventral, for example in the blackbanded sunfish. Stripes are lines that go from the snout to the tail, such as in Aeoliscus strigatus. Stripes and bars often continue through the eye to break up the easily recognized vertebrate eye.

=== Countershading ===
Countershading (dark on top and light on the bottom) in fish works well in conjunction with how light comes into the water from above. Looking from below up at a countershaded fish, the light belly will blend in with the light surface of the water. Looking from above down at a countershaded fish, the dark back will blend with the dark water below. An example of countershading in fish is the Atlantic bluefin tuna. Some fish are even known to have reverse countershading, being light on the dorsal side and dark on the ventral side. An example of this is Tyrannochromis macrostoma, which turns upside-down right before it strikes, essentially disappearing.

=== Mimicry ===
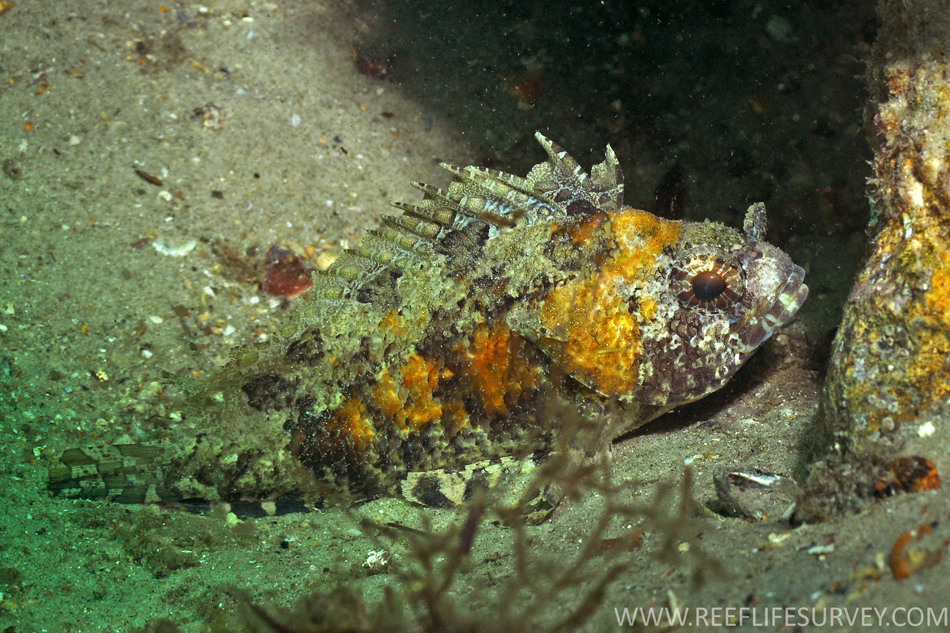
Ex. of Batesian mimicry in false scorpionfish (Centrogenys vaigiensis).

Mimicry is defined as an animal resembling a different animal that is avoided or not commonly preyed upon and is thus conspicuous. There are two types of mimicry: Müllerian mimicry and Batesian mimicry. An example of Batesian mimicry in fishes are the Centrogeniidae (false scorpionfishes), that resemble the Scorpaenidae (scorpionfishes). Another example of Batesian mimicry is the ringed snake eel (Myrichthys colubrinus) that mimics the venomous sea snake Laticauda colubrina. An example of Müllerian mimicry is in saber-toothed blennies. The Meiacanthus atrodorsalis and the Plagiotremus laudandus, both venomous, resemble each other and the Meiacanthus oualanensis and the Plagiotremus laudandus flavus, also both venomous, resemble each other.
