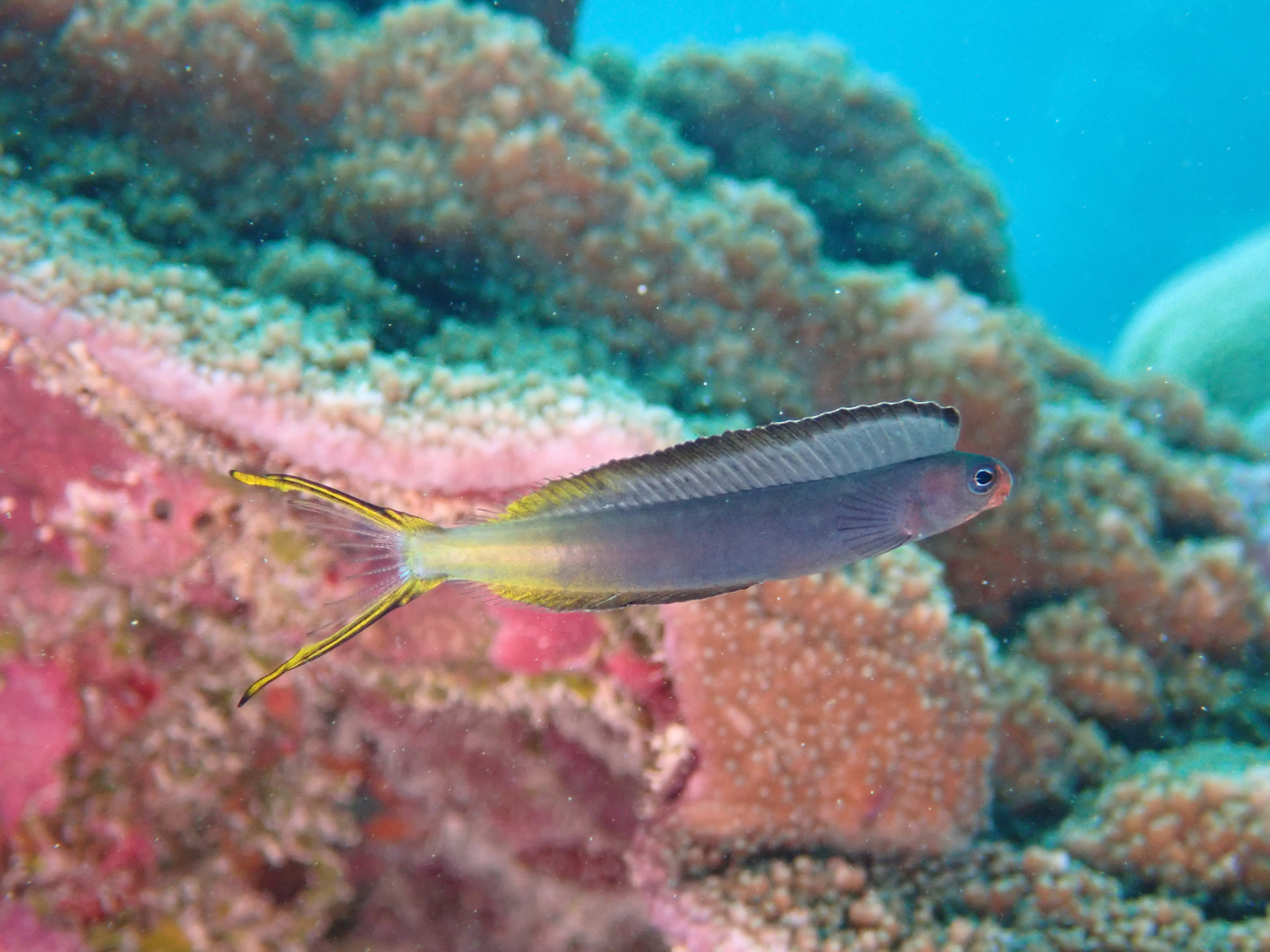
- At New Caledonia
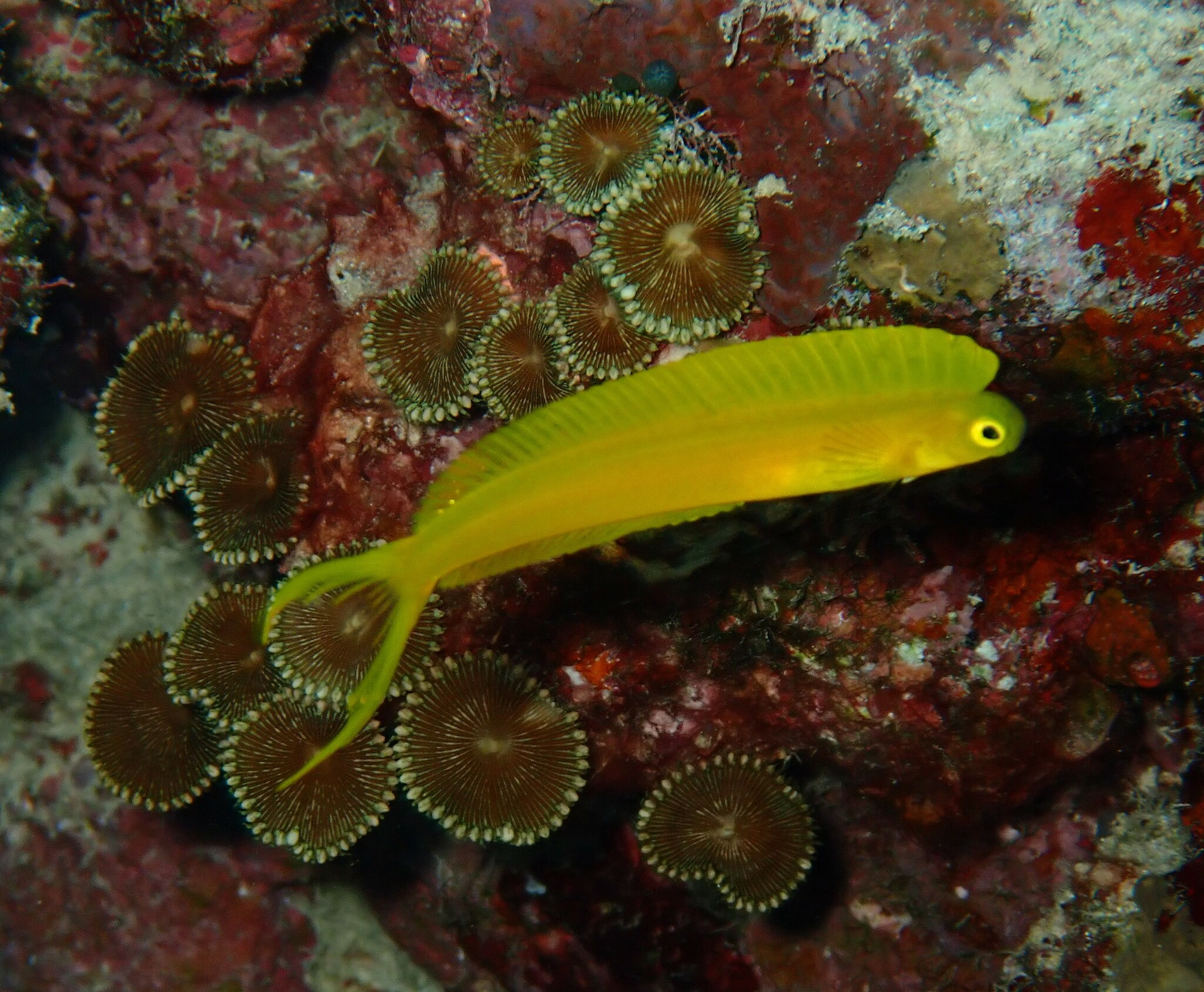
- At Fiji

Conservation status
- Least Concern (IUCN 3.1)

Scientific classification
- Kingdom: Animalia
- Phylum: Chordata
- Class: Actinopterygii
- Division: Teleostei
- Order: Blenniiformes
- Family: Blenniidae
- Genus: Plagiotremus
- Species: P. laudandus

Binomial name
- Plagiotremus laudandus (Whitley, 1961)

Synonyms
- Pescadorichthys laudandus Whitley, 1961

= Plagiotremus laudandus =

Species of fish

Plagiotremus laudandus, the bicolour fangblenny, false harptail-blenny, poison-fang blenny mimic, yellow-tailed blenny or the yellowtail fangblenny mimic, is a species of combtooth blenny found in coral reefs in the western Pacific ocean. This species reaches a length of 8 centimetres (3.1 in) TL.

== Biology ==
This species is a Batesian mimic of Meiacanthus fangblennies. The typical blue and yellow form mimics M. atrodorsalis.

Two fully yellow forms occur in Fiji and Tonga, which mimic M. oualanensis and M. tongaensis respectively. In 1976, these two yellow forms were classified as the subspecies Plagiotremus laudandus flavus, yet not a distinct species because the colour patterns were inconsistent. Despite this, in 2009 the yellow forms were elevated to full species status as Plagiotremus flavus. In 2020, P. flavus was synonymized with P. laudandus on the basis that they are indistinguishable in morphology, and that genetic analyses showed gene flow between the yellow and typical forms in the present or recent past.
