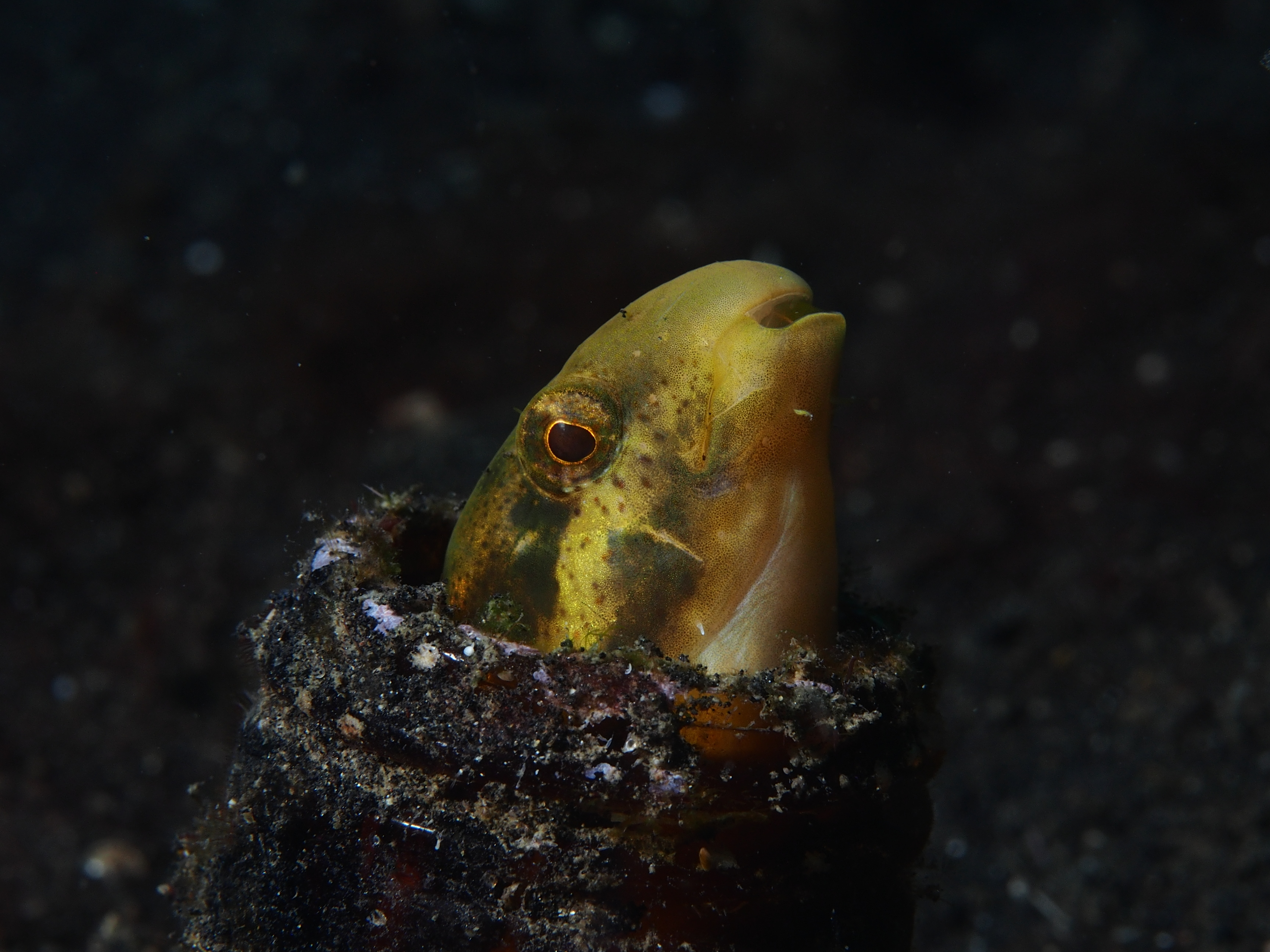

Conservation status
- Least Concern (IUCN 3.1)

Scientific classification
- Kingdom: Animalia
- Phylum: Chordata
- Class: Actinopterygii
- Order: Blenniiformes
- Family: Blenniidae
- Genus: Petroscirtes
- Species: P. fallax

Binomial name
- Petroscirtes fallax Smith-Vaniz, 1976

= Petroscirtes fallax =

Species of fish

Petroscirtes fallax, the deceiver fangbelly or yellow saberetooth blenny, is a species of combtooth blenny found in coral reefs in the western Pacific ocean. This species reaches a length of 9.5 centimetres (3.7 in) TL. This is a small species of blenny with a body which is yellow to whitish in colour and is marked with three longitudinal black stripes. The more ventral stripe extending onto the base of the pectoral fin although not to the base of the anal fin. This species is thought to be a possible Batesian mimic of the Lined Fangblenny, Meiacanthus lineatus, which has a pair of venomous canine-like teeth in its lower jaw.
