= Meiacanthus vicinus =

Conservation status
- Least Concern (IUCN 3.1)

Scientific classification
- Kingdom: Animalia
- Phylum: Chordata
- Class: Actinopterygii
- Order: Blenniiformes
- Family: Blenniidae
- Genus: Meiacanthus
- Species: M. vicinus

Binomial name
- Meiacanthus vicinus Smith-Vaniz, 1987

Species of fish

Meiacanthus vicinus, the Sulawesi fangblenny, is a species of combtooth blenny found in the western central Pacific ocean where it is only known from Indonesia. This species grows to a length of 4.1 centimetres (1.6 in) SL.
