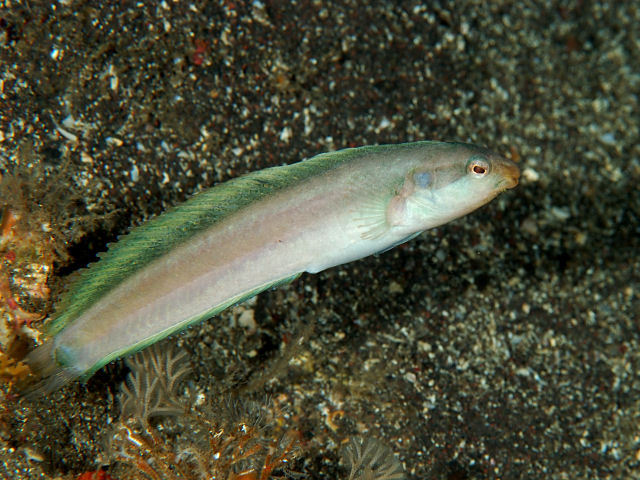

Conservation status
- Least Concern (IUCN 3.1)

Scientific classification
- Kingdom: Animalia
- Phylum: Chordata
- Class: Actinopterygii
- Order: Blenniiformes
- Family: Blenniidae
- Genus: Petroscirtes
- Species: P. springeri

Binomial name
- Petroscirtes springeri Smith-Vaniz, 1976

= Petroscirtes springeri =

Species of fish

Petroscirtes springeri is a species of combtooth blenny found in coral reefs in the northwest Pacific ocean. This species reaches a length of 7.7 centimetres (3.0 in) SL. The specific name honours the American ichthyologist Victor G. Springer of the United States National Museum, it was Springer who first introduced the author to the blenniids and who suggested the study in which Smith-Vaniz described this species.
