= Meiacanthus vittatus =

Conservation status
- Least Concern (IUCN 3.1)

Scientific classification
- Kingdom: Animalia
- Phylum: Chordata
- Class: Actinopterygii
- Order: Blenniiformes
- Family: Blenniidae
- Genus: Meiacanthus
- Species: M. vittatus

Binomial name
- Meiacanthus vittatus Smith-Vaniz, 1976

Species of fish

Meiacanthus vittatus, the one-striped fangblenny, is a species of combtooth blenny found in coral reefs in the western Pacific ocean. This species grows to a length of 8.5 centimetres (3.3 in) TL. This species can be found in the aquarium trade.
