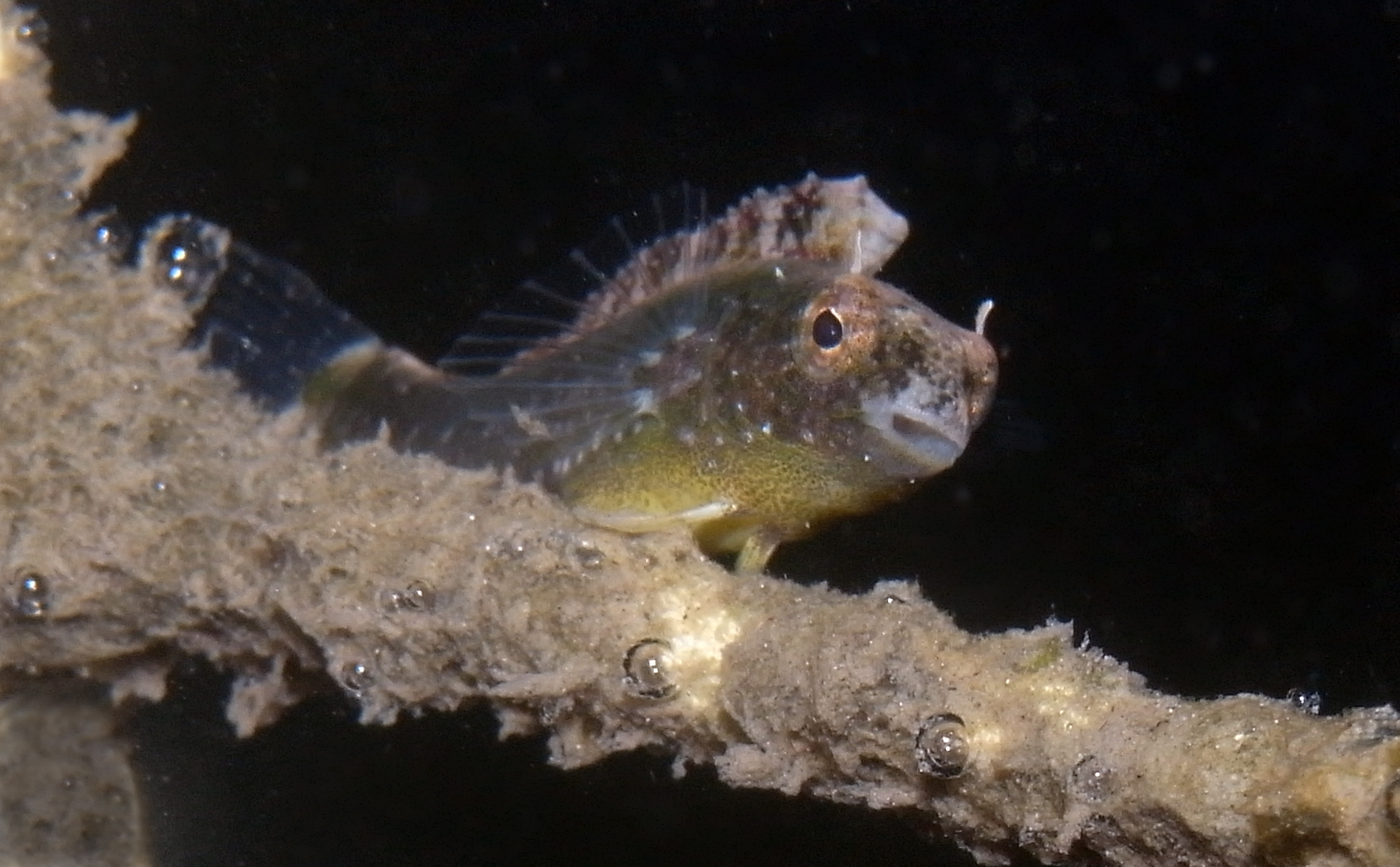
- Juvenile
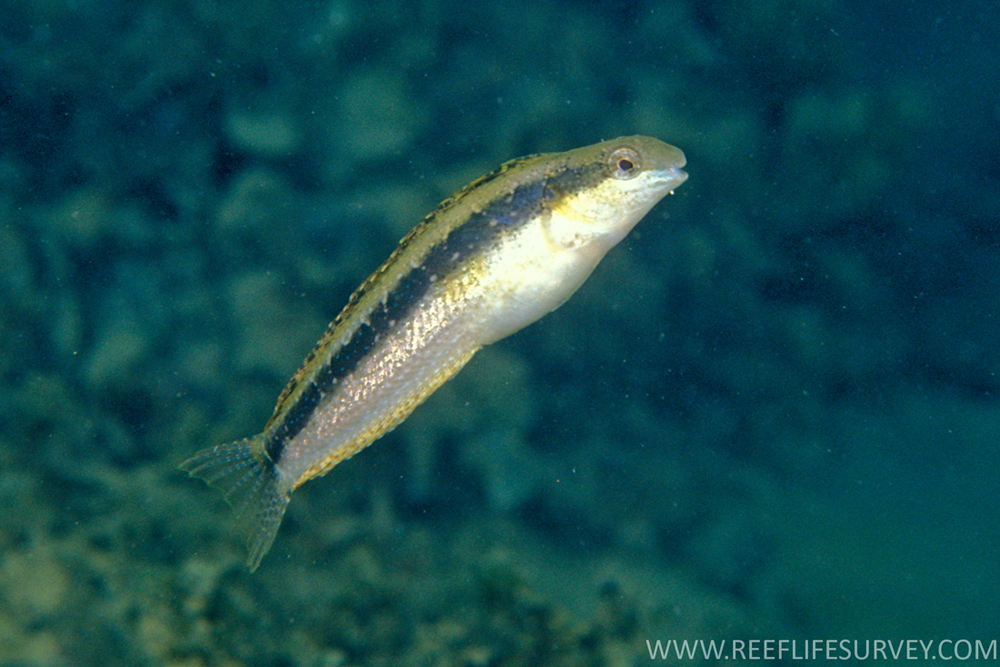
- Red Rock Estuary, Coffs Harbour, New South Wales

Conservation status
- Least Concern (IUCN 3.1)

Scientific classification
- Kingdom: Animalia
- Phylum: Chordata
- Class: Actinopterygii
- Order: Blenniiformes
- Family: Blenniidae
- Genus: Petroscirtes
- Species: P. lupus

Binomial name
- Petroscirtes lupus (De Vis, 1885)

Synonyms
- Salarius lupus De Vis, 1885

= Petroscirtes lupus =

Species of fish

Petroscirtes lupus, the wolf fangbelly, is a species of combtooth blenny found in coral reefs in the western Pacific ocean. This species reaches a length of 13 centimetres (5.1 in) TL. A variably greyish, brown or greenish blenny with six large dark blotches, white dots and dashes on upper sides, and dark dots below. It has two large canines in the lower jaw which are used for defence, although this species is not venomous, and they have been known to bite if handled. They live among sea grass beds, seaweed or the empty shells of molluscs. The female lays her eggs on the interior of a mollusc shell and the male guards them.
