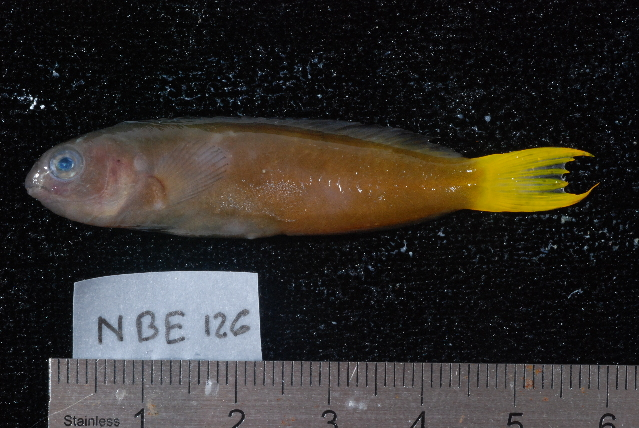

Conservation status
- Least Concern (IUCN 3.1)

Scientific classification
- Kingdom: Animalia
- Phylum: Chordata
- Class: Actinopterygii
- Order: Blenniiformes
- Family: Blenniidae
- Genus: Meiacanthus
- Species: M. mossambicus

Binomial name
- Meiacanthus mossambicus J. L. B. Smith, 1959

= Meiacanthus mossambicus =

Species of fish

Meiacanthus mossambicus, the Mozambique fangblenny, is a species of combtooth blenny found in coral reefs in the western Indian Ocean where it is known to occur off the coast of eastern Africa as well as Madagascar and the Comoro Islands. This species grows to a total length of 10 centimetres (3.9 in). It is sold commercially in the aquarium trade.
