= Meiacanthus ditrema =

Conservation status
- Least Concern (IUCN 3.1)

Scientific classification
- Kingdom: Animalia
- Phylum: Chordata
- Class: Actinopterygii
- Order: Blenniiformes
- Family: Blenniidae
- Genus: Meiacanthus
- Species: M. ditrema

Binomial name
- Meiacanthus ditrema Smith-Vaniz, 1976

Species of fish

Meiacanthus ditrema, the one-striped poison-fang blenny, is a species of combtooth blenny found in coral reefs in the western Pacific ocean. This species grows to a length of 6 centimetres (2.4 in) TL.
