= Meiacanthus limbatus =

Conservation status
- Data Deficient (IUCN 3.1)

Scientific classification
- Kingdom: Animalia
- Phylum: Chordata
- Class: Actinopterygii
- Order: Blenniiformes
- Family: Blenniidae
- Genus: Meiacanthus
- Species: M. limbatus

Binomial name
- Meiacanthus limbatus Smith-Vaniz, 1987

Species of fish

Meiacanthus limbatus, the Manus fangblenny, is a species of combtooth blenny found in the western central Pacific Ocean, around Papua New Guinea. This species grows to a length of 3.7 centimetres (1.5 in) SL.
