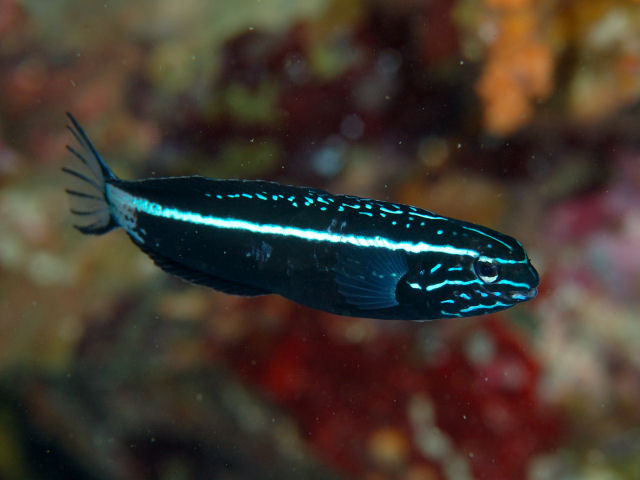

Conservation status
- Least Concern (IUCN 3.1)

Scientific classification
- Kingdom: Animalia
- Phylum: Chordata
- Class: Actinopterygii
- Order: Blenniiformes
- Family: Blenniidae
- Genus: Meiacanthus
- Species: M. kamoharai

Binomial name
- Meiacanthus kamoharai Tomiyama, 1956

= Meiacanthus kamoharai =

Species of fish

Meiacanthus kamoharai is a species of combtooth blenny found in coral reefs in the western Pacific ocean, around southern Japan. This species grows to a length of 6 centimetres (2.4 in) TL.

== Etymology ==
The specific name honours the Japanese ichthyologist Toshiji Kamohara (1901–1972) of Kochi University.
