= Meiacanthus urostigma =

Conservation status
- Least Concern (IUCN 3.1)

Scientific classification
- Kingdom: Animalia
- Phylum: Chordata
- Class: Actinopterygii
- Order: Blenniiformes
- Family: Blenniidae
- Genus: Meiacanthus
- Species: M. urostigma

Binomial name
- Meiacanthus urostigma Smith-Vaniz, Satapoomin & G. R. Allen, 2001

Species of fish

Meiacanthus urostigma, the tailspot fangblenny, is a species of combtooth blenny found in the eastern Indian Ocean where it is only known from the Surin Islands.
