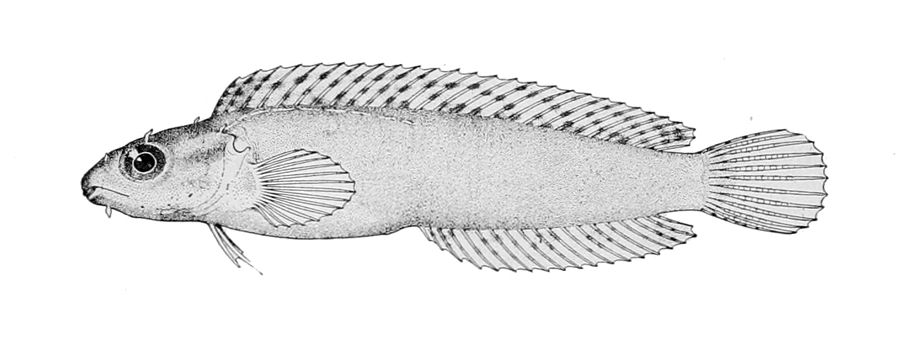

Conservation status
- Least Concern (IUCN 3.1)

Scientific classification
- Kingdom: Animalia
- Phylum: Chordata
- Class: Actinopterygii
- Order: Blenniiformes
- Family: Blenniidae
- Genus: Petroscirtes
- Species: P. variabilis

Binomial name
- Petroscirtes variabilis Cantor, 1849

Synonyms
- Dasson variabilis (Cantor, 1849); Petroskirtes bankanensis Bleeker, 1853; Petroskirtes amboinensis Bleeker, 1853; Petroskirtes solorensis Bleeker, 1853; Salarias viperidens De Vis, 1884; Petroscirtes eretes Jordan & Seale, 1905; Petroscirtes vulsus Jordan & Seale, 1907

= Petroscirtes variabilis =

Species of fish

Petroscirtes variabilis, the variable sabretooth blenny, variable fangblenny, or the variable blenny, is a species of combtooth blenny found in the western Pacific and Indian Ocean. This species reaches a length of 15 centimetres (5.9 in) TL.
