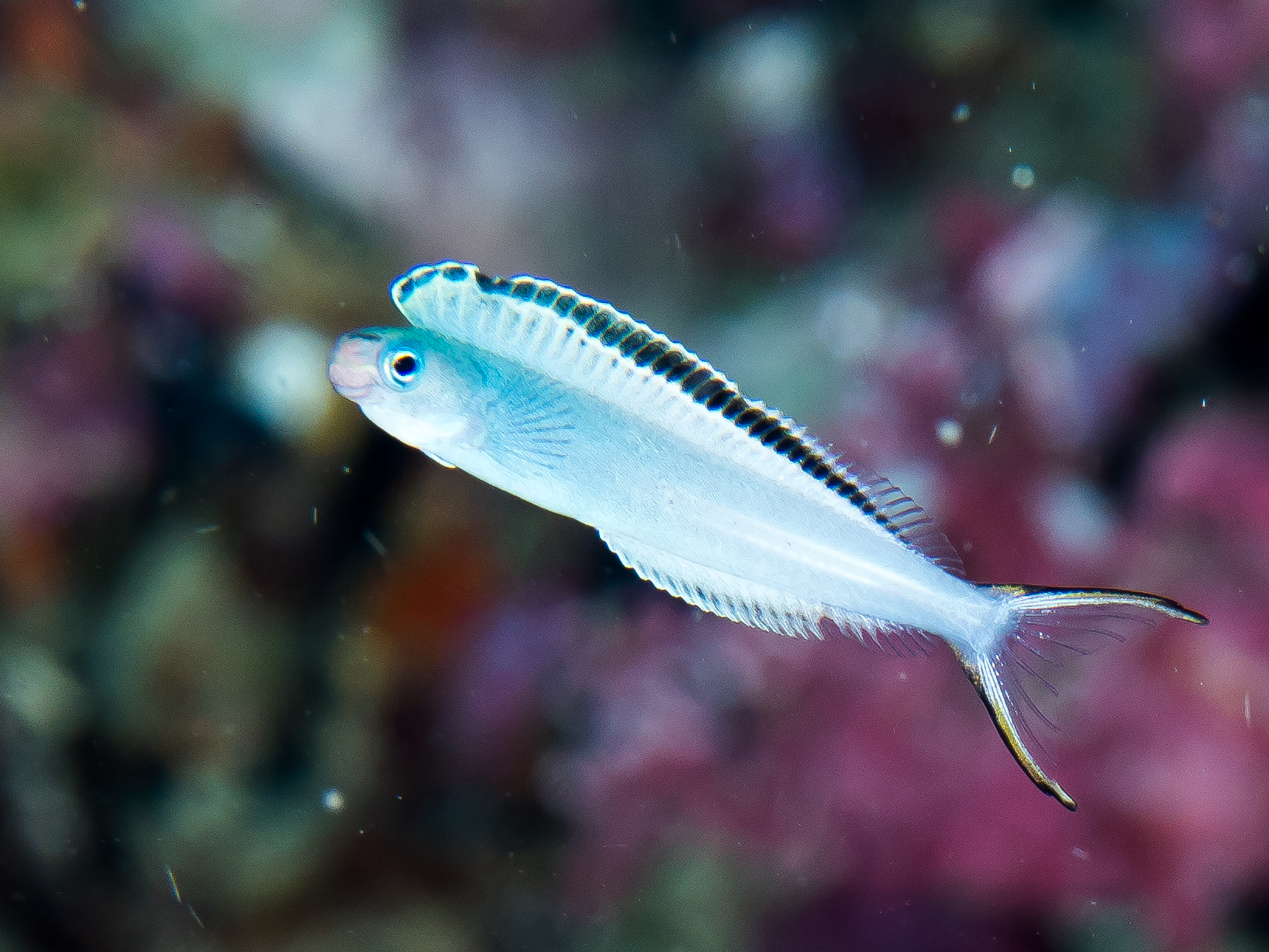

Conservation status
- Least Concern (IUCN 3.1)

Scientific classification
- Kingdom: Animalia
- Phylum: Chordata
- Class: Actinopterygii
- Order: Blenniiformes
- Family: Blenniidae
- Genus: Plagiotremus
- Species: P. phenax

Binomial name
- Plagiotremus phenax Smith-Vaniz, 1976

= Plagiotremus phenax =

Species of fish

Plagiotremus phenax, the Imposter fangblenny, is a species of combtooth blenny found in coral reefs in the Indian Ocean. This species reaches a length of 8 centimetres (3.1 in) TL. This blenny uses bio mimicry to avoid predation, as it has a strong resemblance to the disco blenny (Meiacanthus smithi).
