= Upside-down harptail blenny =

Conservation status
- Least Concern (IUCN 3.1)

Scientific classification
- Kingdom: Animalia
- Phylum: Chordata
- Class: Actinopterygii
- Order: Blenniiformes
- Family: Blenniidae
- Genus: Meiacanthus
- Species: M. abditus

Binomial name
- Meiacanthus abditus Smith-Vaniz, 1987

Species of fish

The upside-down harptail blenny (Meiacanthus abditus) is a species of combtooth blenny found around the Sulu Archipelago in the Philippines. This species grows to a length of 6.5 centimetres (2.6 in) TL.
