= Meiacanthus phaeus =

Conservation status
- Data Deficient (IUCN 3.1)

Scientific classification
- Kingdom: Animalia
- Phylum: Chordata
- Class: Actinopterygii
- Order: Blenniiformes
- Family: Blenniidae
- Genus: Meiacanthus
- Species: M. phaeus

Binomial name
- Meiacanthus phaeus Smith-Vaniz, 1976

Species of fish

Meiacanthus phaeus is a species of combtooth blenny found in coral reefs in the western Pacific ocean.
