= Meiacanthus procne =

Conservation status
- Least Concern (IUCN 3.1)

Scientific classification
- Kingdom: Animalia
- Phylum: Chordata
- Class: Actinopterygii
- Order: Blenniiformes
- Family: Blenniidae
- Genus: Meiacanthus
- Species: M. procne

Binomial name
- Meiacanthus procne Smith-Vaniz, 1976

Species of fish

Meiacanthus procne, the swallowtail fangblenny, is a species of combtooth blenny found in the Pacific ocean where it is only known from Tonga. This species grows to a length of 3.4 centimetres (1.3 in) SL.
