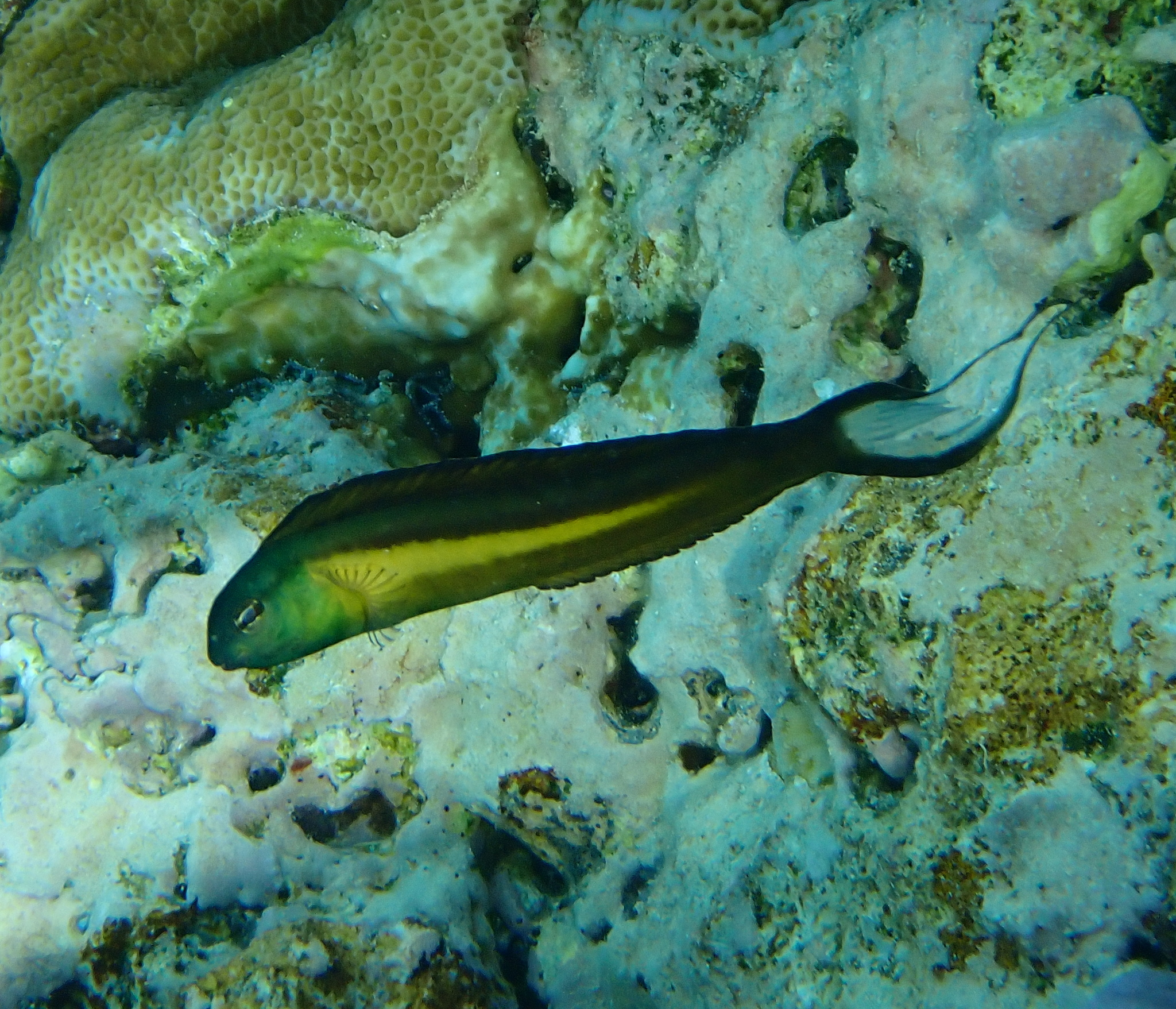

Conservation status
- Least Concern (IUCN 3.1)

Scientific classification
- Kingdom: Animalia
- Phylum: Chordata
- Class: Actinopterygii
- Order: Blenniiformes
- Family: Blenniidae
- Genus: Meiacanthus
- Species: M. bundoon

Binomial name
- Meiacanthus bundoon Smith-Vaniz, 1976
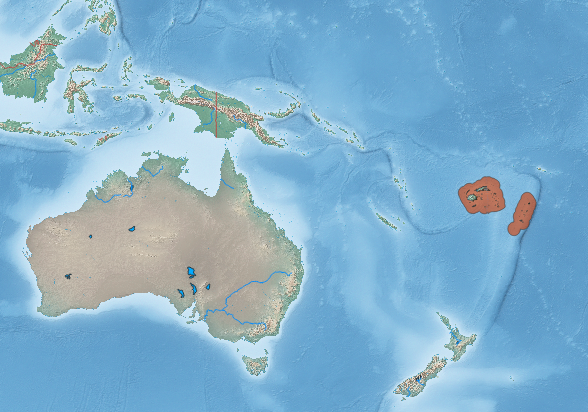

= Meiacanthus bundoon =

Species of fish

Meiacanthus bundoon, commonly known as the Bundoon blenny, is a species of combtooth blenny from the Pacific Ocean where it is known from Fiji and Tonga. This species grows to a total length of 8 centimetres (3.1 in).
