= Meiacanthus fraseri =

Conservation status
- Least Concern (IUCN 3.1)

Scientific classification
- Kingdom: Animalia
- Phylum: Chordata
- Class: Actinopterygii
- Order: Blenniiformes
- Family: Blenniidae
- Genus: Meiacanthus
- Species: M. fraseri

Binomial name
- Meiacanthus fraseri Smith-Vaniz, 1976

Species of fish

Meiacanthus fraseri is a species of combtooth blenny found in the western Indian Ocean, around Cargados Carajos. This species grows to a length of 5.4 centimetres (2.1 in) SL. Its specific name honours Thomas H. Fraser of the Mote Marine Laboratory who collected the type.
