= Meiacanthus luteus =

Conservation status
- Least Concern (IUCN 3.1)

Scientific classification
- Kingdom: Animalia
- Phylum: Chordata
- Class: Actinopterygii
- Order: Blenniiformes
- Family: Blenniidae
- Genus: Meiacanthus
- Species: M. luteus

Binomial name
- Meiacanthus luteus Smith-Vaniz, 1987

Species of fish

Meiacanthus luteus, the yellow fangbelly, is a species of combtooth blenny found in coral reefs in the western Pacific Ocean, around northern Australia. This species grows to a length of 10.3 centimetres (4.1 in) TL.
