= Meiacanthus reticulatus =

Conservation status
- Least Concern (IUCN 3.1)

Scientific classification
- Kingdom: Animalia
- Phylum: Chordata
- Class: Actinopterygii
- Order: Blenniiformes
- Family: Blenniidae
- Genus: Meiacanthus
- Species: M. reticulatus

Binomial name
- Meiacanthus reticulatus Smith-Vaniz, 1976

Species of fish

Meiacanthus reticulatus, the reticulated fangblenny, is a species of combtooth blenny found in coral reefs in the western central Pacific ocean. This species grows to a length of 6.3 cm (2.5 in) SL, or from the tip of the snout to the posterior end of the last vertebra.
