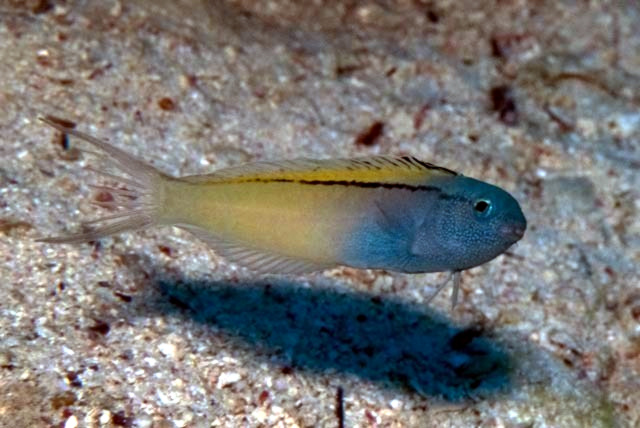

Conservation status
- Least Concern (IUCN 3.1)

Scientific classification
- Kingdom: Animalia
- Phylum: Chordata
- Class: Actinopterygii
- Order: Blenniiformes
- Family: Blenniidae
- Genus: Meiacanthus
- Species: M. nigrolineatus

Binomial name
- Meiacanthus nigrolineatus Smith-Vaniz, 1969

= Meiacanthus nigrolineatus =

Species of fish

Meiacanthus nigrolineatus, the blackline fangblenny, is a blenny from the Western Indian Ocean. This species grows to a length of 9.5 centimetres (3.7 in) TL. This venomous species occasionally makes its way into the aquarium trade.
