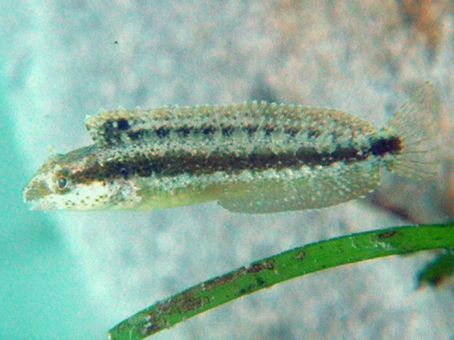

Conservation status
- Least Concern (IUCN 3.1)

Scientific classification
- Kingdom: Animalia
- Phylum: Chordata
- Class: Actinopterygii
- Division: Teleostei
- Order: Blenniiformes
- Family: Blenniidae
- Genus: Petroscirtes
- Species: P. ancylodon

Binomial name
- Petroscirtes ancylodon Rüppell, 1835

= Petroscirtes ancylodon =

Species of fish

Petroscirtes ancylodon, the Arabian fangblenny, is a species of combtooth blenny found in the western Indian Ocean, and since 1989 recorded on occasion in the Levantine waters of the Mediterranean Sea, a likely entry from the Suez Canal. Males of this species reach a length of 11.5 cm TL while females reach a maximum length of 7.9 cm SL.
