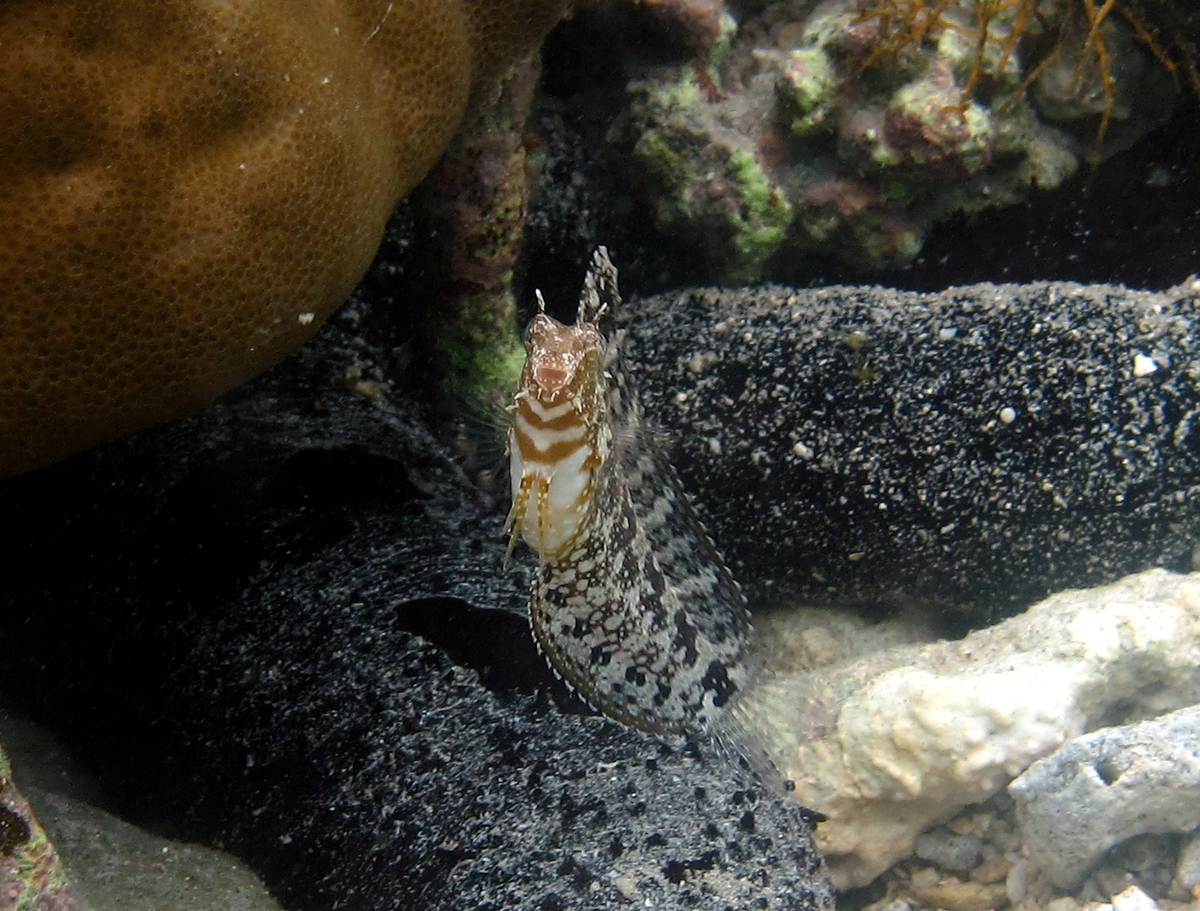

Conservation status
- Least Concern (IUCN 3.1)

Scientific classification
- Kingdom: Animalia
- Phylum: Chordata
- Class: Actinopterygii
- Order: Blenniiformes
- Family: Blenniidae
- Genus: Petroscirtes
- Species: P. mitratus

Binomial name
- Petroscirtes mitratus Rüppell, 1830

Synonyms
- Petroscirtes barbatus Peters, 1855; Petroskirtes marmoratus Bleeker, 1875; Petroscirtes marmoratus Liénard, 1891

= Petroscirtes mitratus =

Species of fish

Petroscirtes mitratus, the floral blenny, floral fangblenny, helmeted blenny, or the crested sabretooth blenny, is a species of combtooth blenny found in coral reefs in the Pacific and Indian Ocean. This species reaches a length of 8.5 centimetres (3.3 in) TL. It is the type species of the genus Petroscirtes.
