= Meiacanthus naevius =

Conservation status
- Vulnerable (IUCN 3.1)

Scientific classification
- Kingdom: Animalia
- Phylum: Chordata
- Class: Actinopterygii
- Order: Blenniiformes
- Family: Blenniidae
- Genus: Meiacanthus
- Species: M. naevius

Binomial name
- Meiacanthus naevius Smith-Vaniz, 1987

Species of fish

Meiacanthus naevius, the birthmark fangblenny, is a species of combtooth blenny found in the eastern Indian Ocean, around western Australia. This species grows to a length of 3.6 centimetres (1.4 in) SL.
