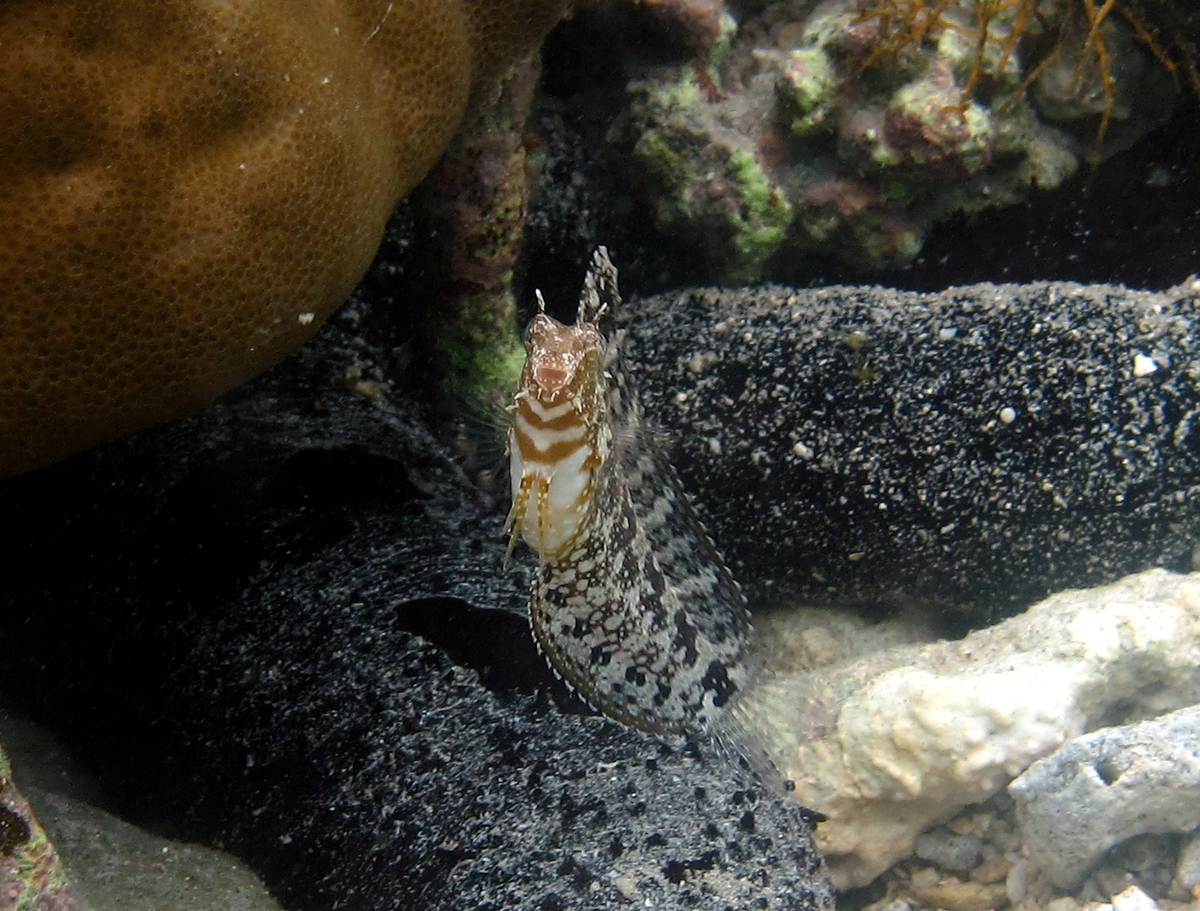
- Petroscirtes mitratus Réunion

Scientific classification
- Kingdom: Animalia
- Phylum: Chordata
- Class: Actinopterygii
- Order: Blenniiformes
- Family: Blenniidae
- Subfamily: Blenniinae
- Genus: Petroscirtes; Rüppell, 1830

Type species
- Petroscirtes mitratus Rüppell, 1830

Species
- See text

Synonyms
- Dasson Jordan & Hubbs, 1925; Ostreoblennius Whitley, 1930

= Petroscirtes =

Genus of fishes

Petroscirtes is a genus of combtooth blennies found in the western Pacific, and Indian oceans. Some species of this genus have venom that interacts with opioid receptors. Adults usually inhabit coastal reefs and estuaries to depths of about 10 meters, but they can also be found up to 15 meters in depth in sandy and weedy areas among clumps of Sargassum or other seaweeds in coastal and lagoon reefs. They can be found in nests inside small-necked bottles and abandoned worm tubes or shells.

== Species ==
There are currently 11 recognized species in this genus:

- Petroscirtes ancylodon Rüppell, 1835 (Arabian fangblenny)
- Petroscirtes breviceps (Valenciennes, 1836) (Striped poison-fang blenny mimic)
- Petroscirtes fallax Smith-Vaniz, 1976 (Deceiver fangbelly)
- Petroscirtes lupus (De Vis, 1885) (Wolf fangbelly)
- Petroscirtes marginatus Smith-Vaniz, 1976
- Petroscirtes mitratus Rüppell, 1830 (Floral blenny)
- Petroscirtes pylei Smith-Vaniz, 2005 (Twilight Fangblenny)
- Petroscirtes springeri Smith-Vaniz, 1976
- Petroscirtes thepassii Bleeker, 1853 (Thepas' sabretooth blenny)
- Petroscirtes variabilis Cantor, 1849 (Variable sabretooth blenny)
- Petroscirtes xestus D. S. Jordan & Seale, 1906 (Xestus sabretooth blenny)
