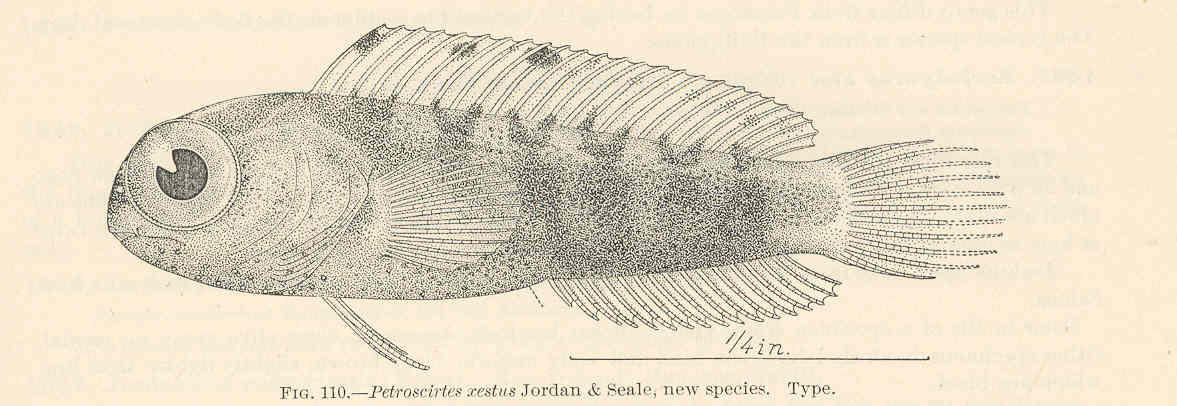

Conservation status
- Least Concern (IUCN 3.1)

Scientific classification
- Kingdom: Animalia
- Phylum: Chordata
- Class: Actinopterygii
- Order: Blenniiformes
- Family: Blenniidae
- Genus: Petroscirtes
- Species: P. xestus

Binomial name
- Petroscirtes xestus D. S. Jordan & Seale, 1906

Synonyms
- Petroscirtes pindae J. L. B. Smith, 1959

= Petroscirtes xestus =

Species of fish

Petroscirtes xestus, the xestus sabretooth blenny, xestus fangblenny, or the bearded sabretooth blenny, is a species of combtooth blenny found in coral reefs in the Pacific and Indian Ocean. This species reaches a length of 7 centimetres (2.8 in) TL.
