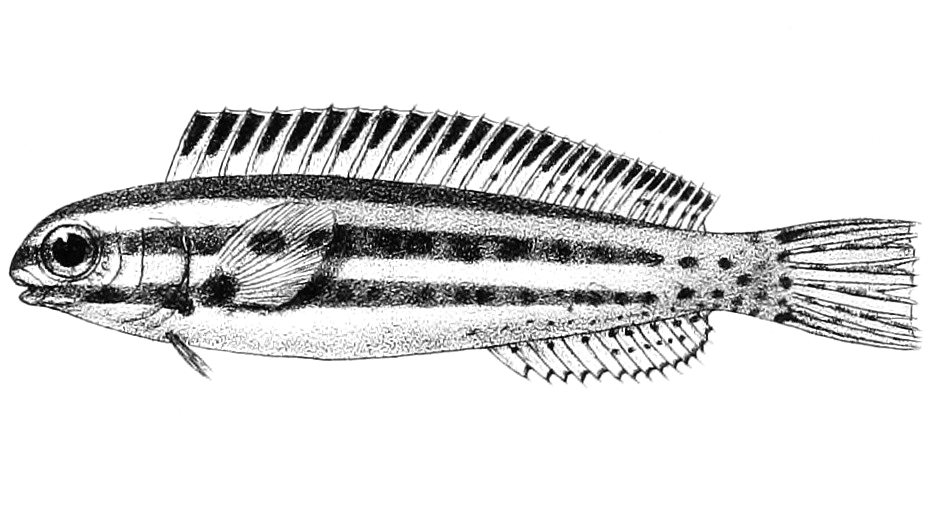

Conservation status
- Least Concern (IUCN 3.1)

Scientific classification
- Kingdom: Animalia
- Phylum: Chordata
- Class: Actinopterygii
- Order: Blenniiformes
- Family: Blenniidae
- Genus: Meiacanthus
- Species: M. anema

Binomial name
- Meiacanthus anema Bleeker, 1852

Synonyms
- Petroscirtes anema (Bleeker, 1852); Petroscirtes grammistes (Valenciennes, 1836)

= Meiacanthus anema =

Species of fish

Meiacanthus anema, the threadless blenny, is a species of combtooth blenny found in Asia and Oceania. This species grows to a length of 7.2 centimetres (2.8 in) SL. This venomous species can also be found in the aquarium trade.
