= Petroscirtes thepassii =

Conservation status
- Least Concern (IUCN 3.1)

Scientific classification
- Kingdom: Animalia
- Phylum: Chordata
- Class: Actinopterygii
- Order: Blenniiformes
- Family: Blenniidae
- Genus: Petroscirtes
- Species: P. thepassii

Binomial name
- Petroscirtes thepassii Bleeker, 1853

Species of fish

Petroscirtes thepassii, the Thepas' sabretooth blenny or the Thepas' fangblenny, is a species of combtooth blenny found in the western central Pacific ocean. This species reaches a length of 5.9 centimetres (2.3 in) SL. The specific name of this blenny honours the collector of the type, the military surgeon A.H. Thepass.
