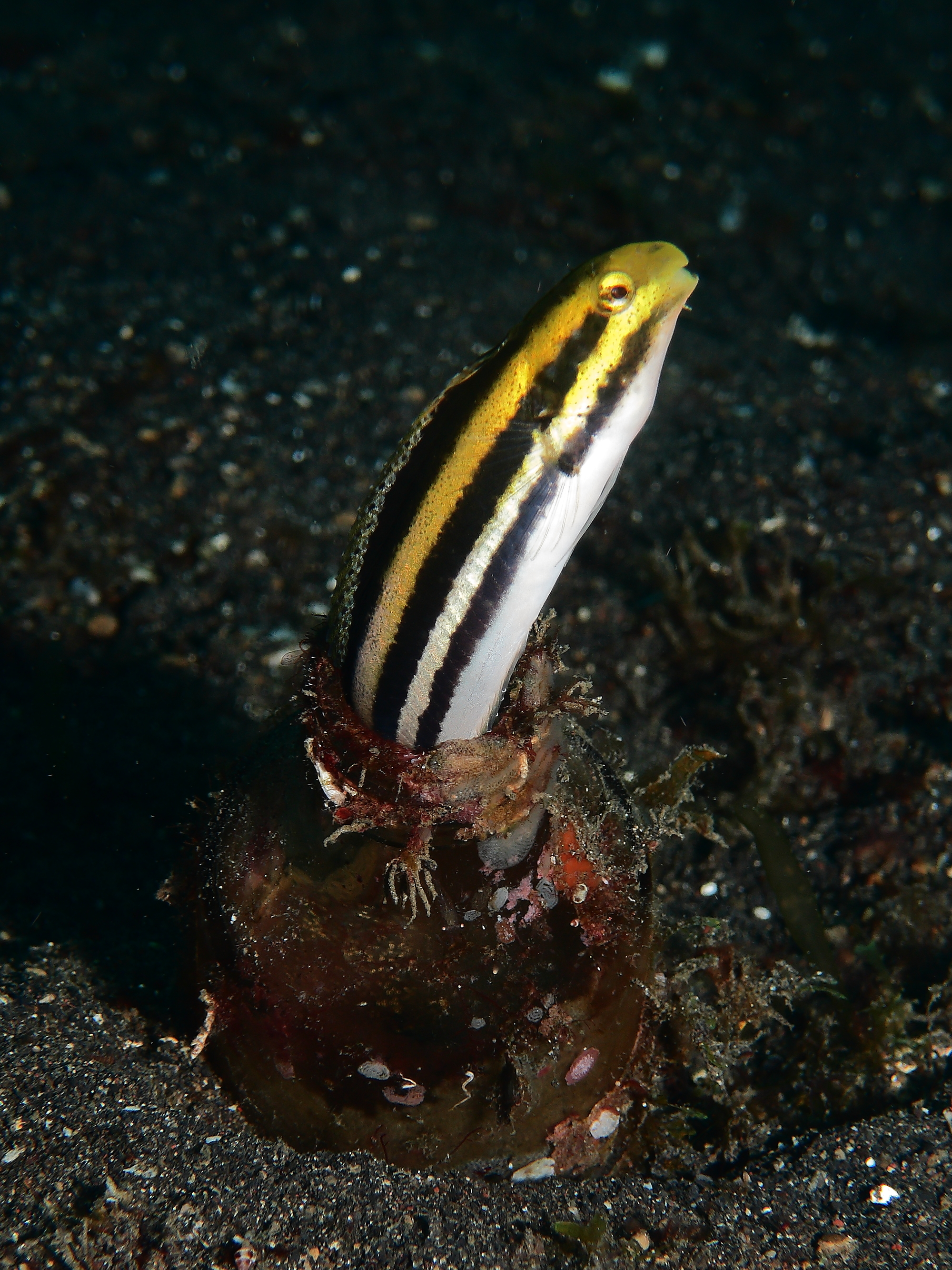

Conservation status
- Least Concern (IUCN 3.1)

Scientific classification
- Kingdom: Animalia
- Phylum: Chordata
- Class: Actinopterygii
- Order: Blenniiformes
- Family: Blenniidae
- Genus: Petroscirtes
- Species: P. breviceps

Binomial name
- Petroscirtes breviceps (Valenciennes, 1836)

Synonyms
- Blennechis breviceps Valenciennes, 1836; Aspidontus trossulus Jordan & Snyder, 1902; Dasson trossulus (Jordan & Snyder, 1902); Petroscirtes annamensis Chabanaud, 1924

= Petroscirtes breviceps =

Species of fish

Petroscirtes breviceps, the striped poison-fang blenny mimic, striped fangblenny mimic, short-head sabretooth blenny, short-headed blenny, sabretooth blenny, or the black-banded blenny, is a species of combtooth blenny found in coral reefs in the western Pacific and Indian Ocean. This species reaches a length of 11 centimetres (4.3 in) SL.
