= Meiacanthus crinitus =

Conservation status
- Least Concern (IUCN 3.1)

Scientific classification
- Kingdom: Animalia
- Phylum: Chordata
- Class: Actinopterygii
- Order: Blenniiformes
- Family: Blenniidae
- Genus: Meiacanthus
- Species: M. crinitus

Binomial name
- Meiacanthus crinitus Smith-Vaniz, 1987

Species of fish

Meiacanthus crinitus, the hairytail fangblenny, is a species of combtooth blenny found in the western Pacific ocean, around Indonesia. This species grows to a length of 10 centimetres (3.9 in) TL.
