= Petroscirtes marginatus =

Conservation status
- Least Concern (IUCN 3.1)

Scientific classification
- Kingdom: Animalia
- Phylum: Chordata
- Class: Actinopterygii
- Order: Blenniiformes
- Family: Blenniidae
- Genus: Petroscirtes
- Species: P. marginatus

Binomial name
- Petroscirtes marginatus Smith-Vaniz, 1976

Species of fish

Petroscirtes marginatus is a species of combtooth blenny found in the western Pacific ocean. This species reaches a length of 4.9 centimetres (1.9 in) SL.
