= Petroscirtes pylei =

Conservation status
- Least Concern (IUCN 3.1)

Scientific classification
- Kingdom: Animalia
- Phylum: Chordata
- Class: Actinopterygii
- Division: Teleostei
- Order: Blenniiformes
- Family: Blenniidae
- Genus: Petroscirtes
- Species: P. pylei

Binomial name
- Petroscirtes pylei Smith-Vaniz, 2005

Species of fish

Petroscirtes pylei, the twilight fangblenny, is a species of combtooth blenny found in the western central Pacific ocean, around Fiji. This species reaches a length of 4.1 centimetres (1.6 in) SL. The specific name honours the American ichthyologist Richard L. Pyle of the Bishop Museum in Honolulu.
