= Meiacanthus tongaensis =

Conservation status
- Least Concern (IUCN 3.1)

Scientific classification
- Kingdom: Animalia
- Phylum: Chordata
- Class: Actinopterygii
- Order: Blenniiformes
- Family: Blenniidae
- Genus: Meiacanthus
- Species: M. tongaensis

Binomial name
- Meiacanthus tongaensis Smith-Vaniz, 1987

Species of fish

Meiacanthus tongaensis is a species of combtooth blenny found in the Pacific ocean where it is only known from Tonga. This species grows to a length of 6.7 centimetres (2.6 in) SL.
