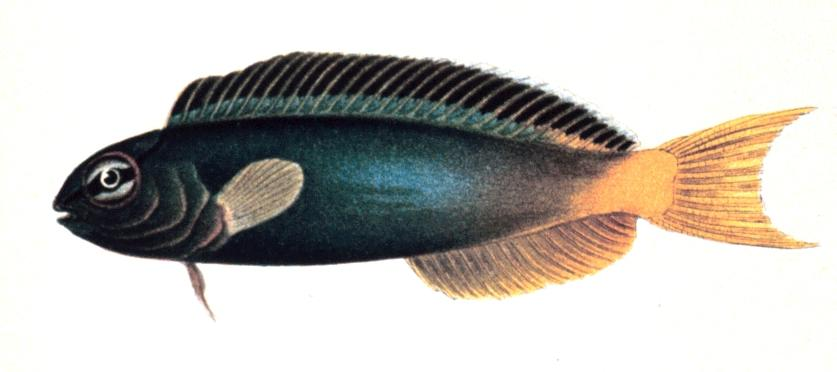
- Meiacanthus atrodorsalis

Scientific classification
- Kingdom: Animalia
- Phylum: Chordata
- Class: Actinopterygii
- Division: Teleostei
- Order: Blenniiformes
- Family: Blenniidae
- Subfamily: Blenniinae
- Genus: Meiacanthus; Norman, 1944

Type species
- Petroscirtes ovalanensis Günther, 1880

Species
- See text

= Meiacanthus =

Genus of fishes

Meiacanthus is a genus of combtooth blennies found in the western Pacific and Indian oceans. Many species in this genus make their way into the aquarium trade and several are venomous. The genus name Meiacanthus is derived from the Greek meion meaning "less" and akantha meaning "thorn" and refers to most species having relatively few dorsal fin spines.

== Species ==
There are currently 28 recognized species in this genus:

- Meiacanthus abditus Smith-Vaniz, 1987
- Meiacanthus abruptus Smith-Vaniz & G. R. Allen, 2011
- Meiacanthus anema (Bleeker, 1852) (Threadless blenny)
- Meiacanthus atrodorsalis (Günther, 1877) (Forktail blenny)
- Meiacanthus bundoon Smith-Vaniz, 1976 (Bundoon blenny)
- Meiacanthus crinitus Smith-Vaniz, 1987
- Meiacanthus cyanopterus Smith-Vaniz & G. R. Allen, 2011
- Meiacanthus ditrema Smith-Vaniz, 1976 (One-striped poison-fang blenny)
- Meiacanthus erdmanni Smith-Vaniz & G. R. Allen, 2011
- Meiacanthus fraseri Smith-Vaniz, 1976
- Meiacanthus geminatus Smith-Vaniz, 1976
- Meiacanthus grammistes (Valenciennes, 1836) (Striped poison-fang blenny)
- Meiacanthus kamoharai Tomiyama, 1956
- Meiacanthus limbatus Smith-Vaniz, 1987
- Meiacanthus lineatus (De Vis, 1884) (Lined fangblenny)
- Meiacanthus luteus Smith-Vaniz, 1987 (Yellow fangbelly)
- Meiacanthus mossambicus J. L. B. Smith, 1959 (Mozambique fangblenny)
- Meiacanthus naevius Smith-Vaniz, 1987
- Meiacanthus nigrolineatus Smith-Vaniz, 1969 (Blackline fangblenny)
- Meiacanthus oualanensis (Günther, 1880)
- Meiacanthus phaeus Smith-Vaniz, 1976
- Meiacanthus procne Smith-Vaniz, 1976
- Meiacanthus reticulatus Smith-Vaniz, 1976
- Meiacanthus smithi Klausewitz, 1962 (Disco blenny)
- Meiacanthus solomon William F. Smith-Vaniz & Gerald R. Allen, 2019
- Meiacanthus tongaensis (Smith-Vaniz, 1987
- Meiacanthus urostigma Smith-Vaniz, Satapoomin & G. R. Allen, 2001
- Meiacanthus vicinus Smith-Vaniz, 1987
- Meiacanthus vittatus Smith-Vaniz, 1976 (One-striped fangblenny)
