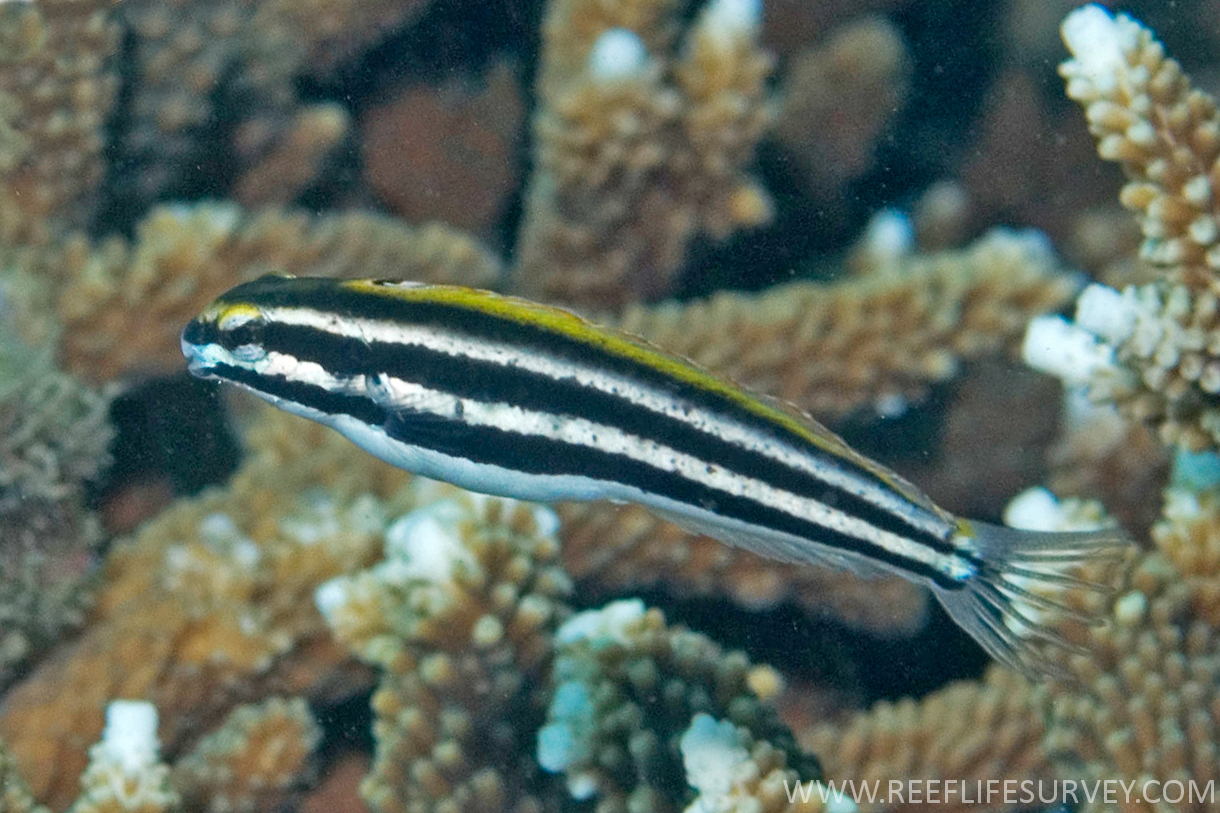

Conservation status
- Least Concern (IUCN 3.1)

Scientific classification
- Kingdom: Animalia
- Phylum: Chordata
- Class: Actinopterygii
- Order: Blenniiformes
- Family: Blenniidae
- Genus: Meiacanthus
- Species: M. lineatus

Binomial name
- Meiacanthus lineatus (De Vis, 1884)

Synonyms
- Petroscirtes lineatus De Vis, 1884

= Meiacanthus lineatus =

Species of fish

Meiacanthus lineatus, the lined fangblenny, is a venomous species of combtooth blenny found in the Great Barrier Reef in the western Pacific Ocean. This species grows to a length of 9.5 centimetres (3.7 in) TL.
