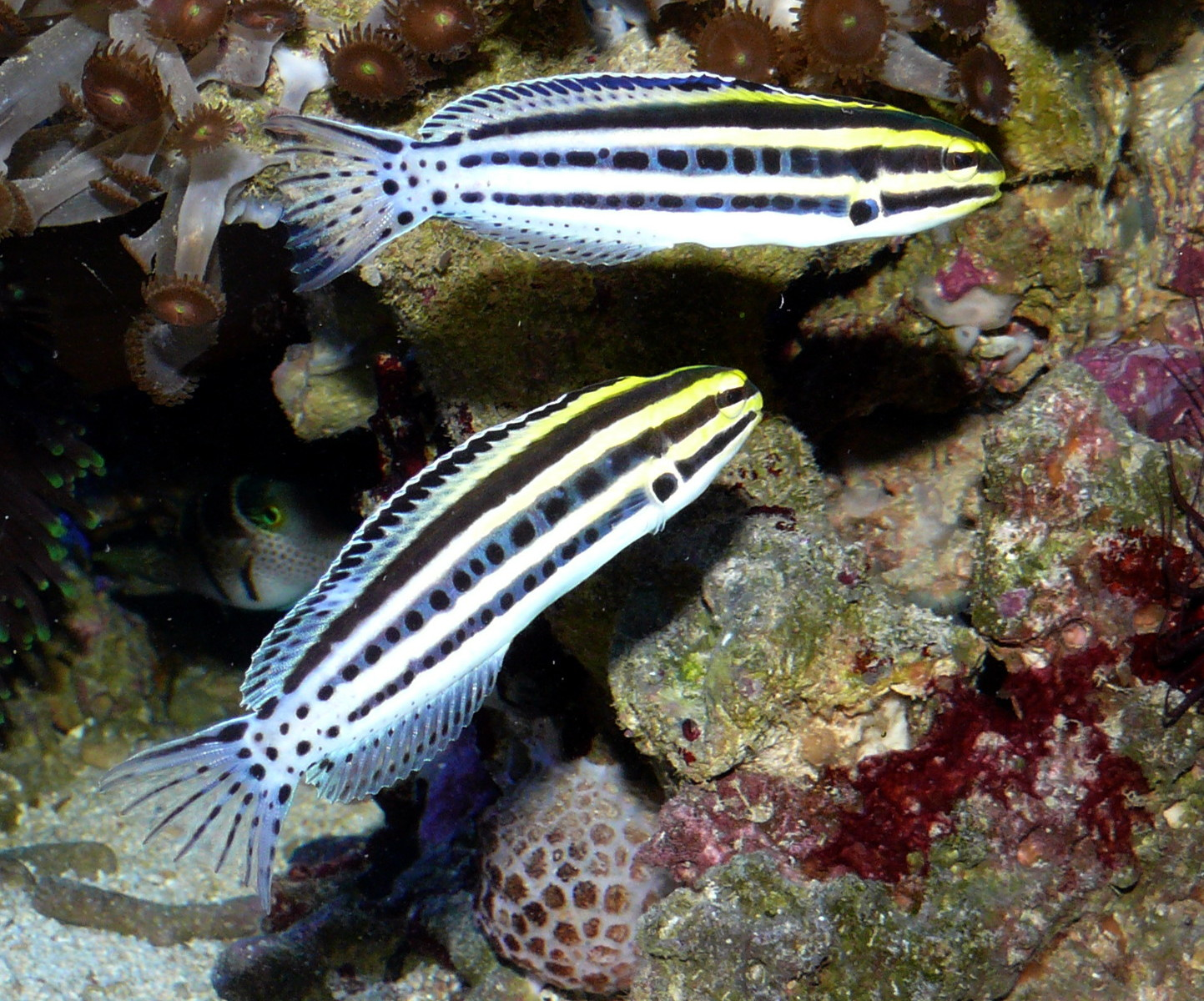

Conservation status
- Least Concern (IUCN 3.1)

Scientific classification
- Kingdom: Animalia
- Phylum: Chordata
- Class: Actinopterygii
- Division: Teleostei
- Order: Blenniiformes
- Family: Blenniidae
- Genus: Meiacanthus
- Species: M. grammistes

Binomial name
- Meiacanthus grammistes (Valenciennes, 1836)

Synonyms
- Blennechis grammistes Valenciennes, 1836

= Meiacanthus grammistes =

Species of combtooth blenny

Meiacanthus grammistes, the striped blenny, also called the striped fang blenny, grammistes blenny, line-spot harptail blenny or striped poison-fang blenny, is a species of combtooth blenny from the western Pacific Ocean. The fish stays in the open ocean, but travels into shallow saltwater and brackish estuaries. This venomous species occasionally makes its way into the aquarium trade.

== Anatomy ==
The fish is stout and deep-bodied, with a pointed snout and long continuous dorsal fin. It is brown with tan wavy bands stretching the length of its body. On the dorsal fin near the head is a small blue spot. This species grows to 11 cm (4.3 in) TL. The fish has relatively large fangs (canine teeth) that protrude from the lower jaw.

== Venom ==
The unusual venom, which targets the body's opioid receptors, is being investigated as a potential new painkiller for human use. The venom consists of a neuropeptide also seen in cone snail venom, a lipase similar to the one used by certain species of scorpions and an opioid peptide. Blennies use it to stun predators. The venom reduces the blood pressure of the predator, relaxing its jaws so the blenny can escape. Administration of the venom was found to not cause pain in mice, which is atypical, as most fish venoms are painful. Administration of the venom also did not result in a drop in heart rate in rats.
