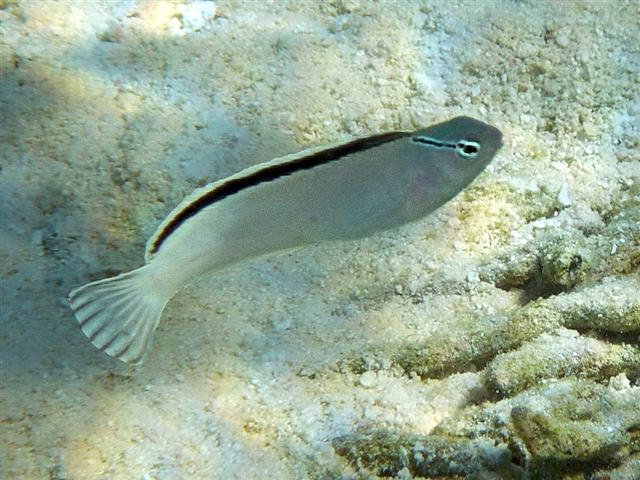

Conservation status
- Least Concern (IUCN 3.1)

Scientific classification
- Kingdom: Animalia
- Phylum: Chordata
- Class: Actinopterygii
- Order: Blenniiformes
- Family: Blenniidae
- Genus: Meiacanthus
- Species: M. smithi

Binomial name
- Meiacanthus smithi Klausewitz, 1962

= Disco blenny =

Species of fish

Meiacanthus smithi, the disco blenny, is a species of combtooth blenny found in coral reefs in the eastern Indian Ocean. This species grows to a length of 8.5 centimetres (3.3 in) TL. It is also commonly known as Smith's fangblenny, Smith's sawtail blenny or Smith's harp-tail blenny. This species is also found in the aquarium trade.

== Etymology ==
The specific name honours the South African chemist and ichthyologist James Leonard Brierley Smith (1897–1968) of Rhodes University in Grahamstown.
