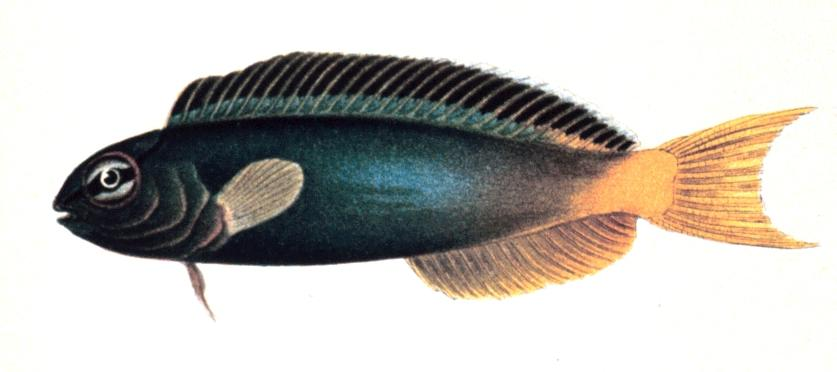

Conservation status
- Least Concern (IUCN 3.1)

Scientific classification
- Kingdom: Animalia
- Phylum: Chordata
- Class: Actinopterygii
- Division: Teleostei
- Order: Blenniiformes
- Family: Blenniidae
- Genus: Meiacanthus
- Species: M. atrodorsalis

Binomial name
- Meiacanthus atrodorsalis (Günther, 1877)

Synonyms
- Petroscirtes atrodorsalis Günther, 1877; Petroscirtes herlihyi Fowler, 1946

= Meiacanthus atrodorsalis =

Species of fish

Meiacanthus atrodorsalis, the forktail blenny, is a species of combtooth blenny found in coral reefs in the western Pacific ocean. This species grows to a length of 11 centimetres (4.3 in) TL. This venomous species can also be found in the aquarium trade. It is also known as the eyelash harptail-blenny, poison-fang blenny or the yellowtail poison-fang blenny.
