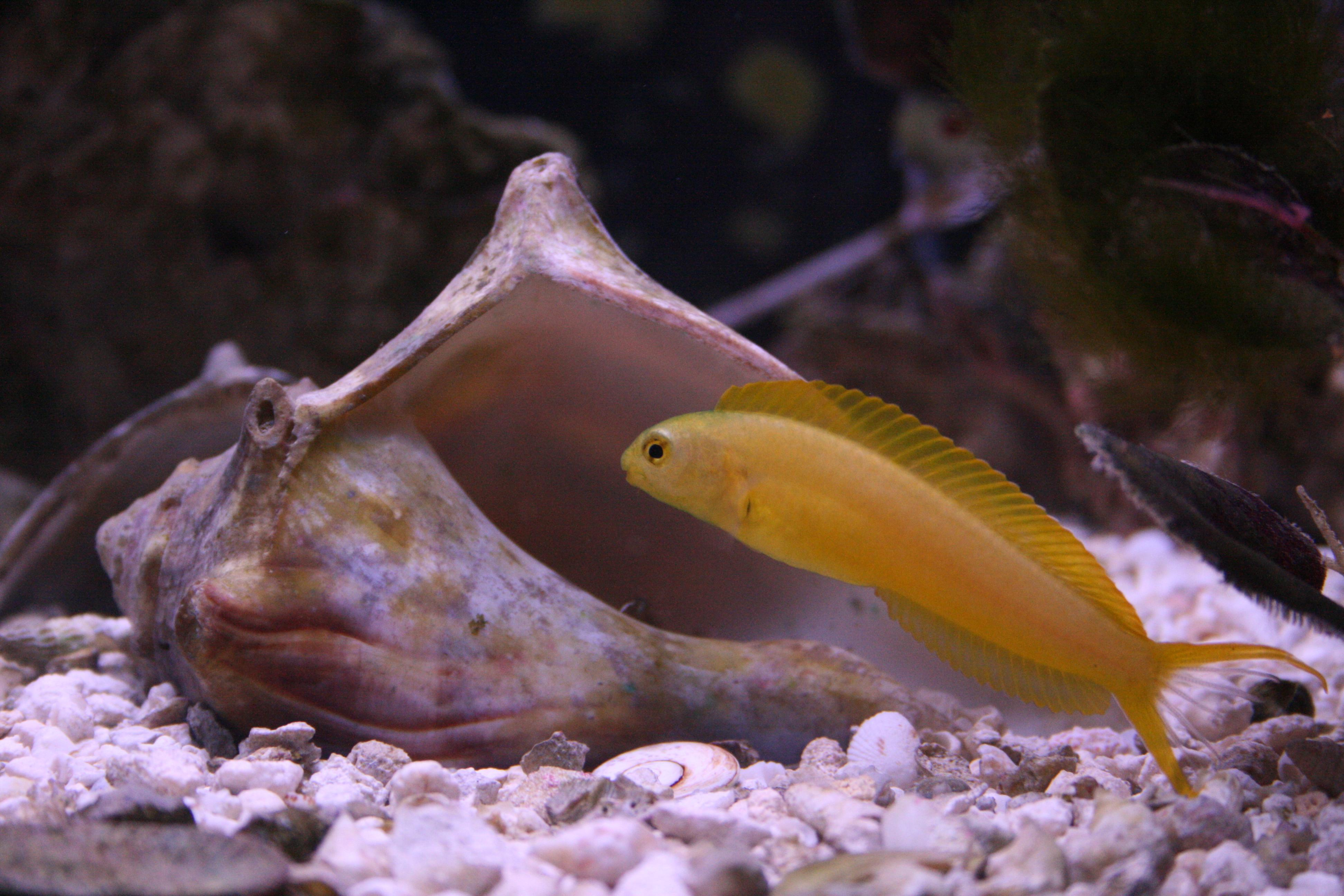

Conservation status
- Least Concern (IUCN 3.1)

Scientific classification
- Kingdom: Animalia
- Phylum: Chordata
- Class: Actinopterygii
- Order: Blenniiformes
- Family: Blenniidae
- Genus: Meiacanthus
- Species: M. oualanensis

Binomial name
- Meiacanthus oualanensis (Günther, 1880)

Synonyms
- Petroscirtes oualanensis Günther, 1880; Meiacanthus ovalauensis (Günther, 1880); Petroscirtes auratus Seale, 1936

= Meiacanthus oualanensis =

Species of fish

Meiacanthus oualanensis, the canary fangblenny, is a blenny from the Western Central Pacific where it is only known from Fiji. This species grows to a length of 5 centimetres (2.0 in) SL.
