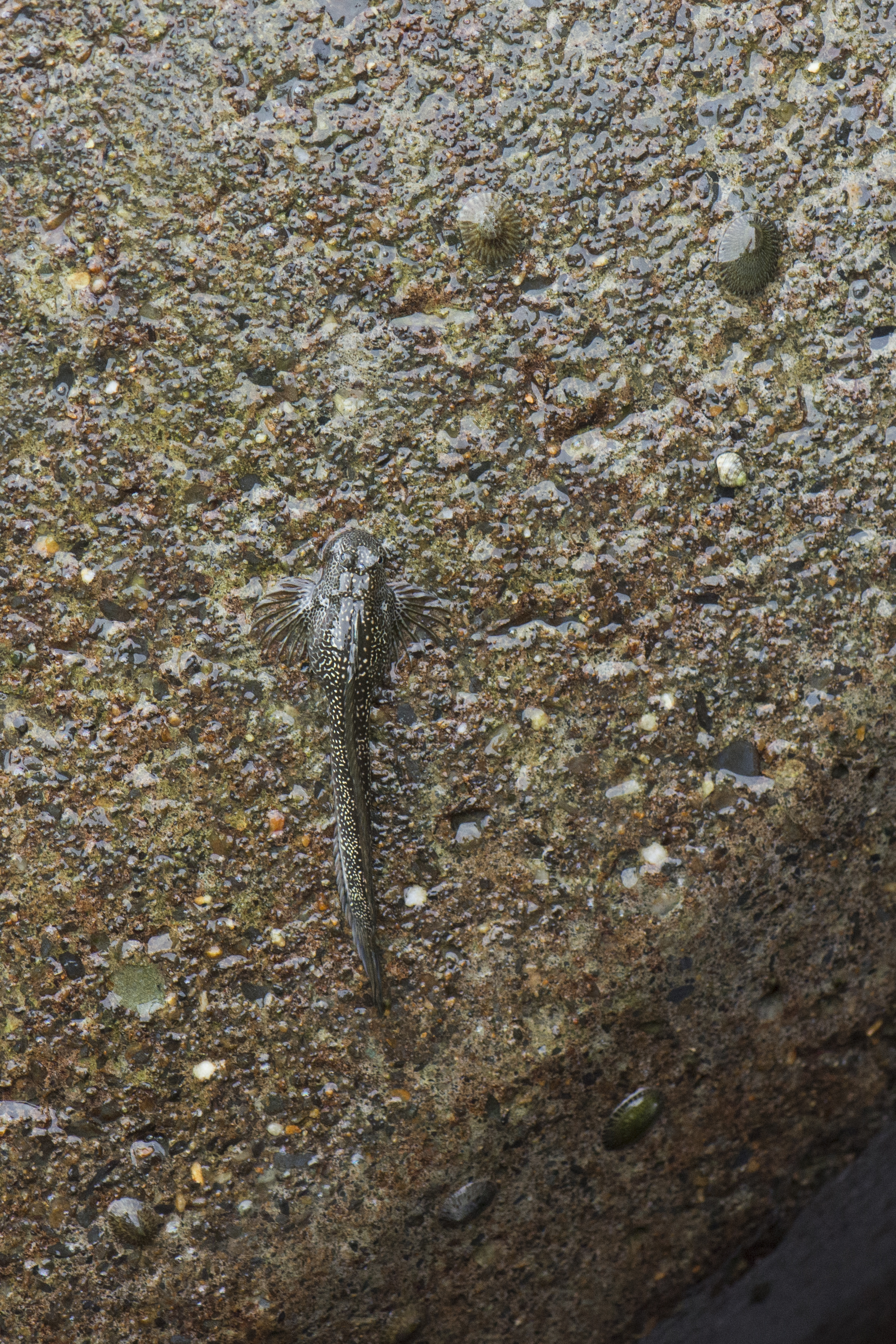

Conservation status
- Data Deficient (IUCN 3.1)

Scientific classification
- Kingdom: Animalia
- Phylum: Chordata
- Class: Actinopterygii
- Order: Blenniiformes
- Family: Blenniidae
- Genus: Andamia
- Species: A. tetradactylus

Binomial name
- Andamia tetradactylus (Bleeker, 1858)

Synonyms
- Salarias tetradactylus Bleeker, 1858

= Andamia tetradactylus =

Species of fish

Andamia tetradactylus is a species of combtooth blenny found in the western Pacific Ocean, around the Ryukyu Islands and Indonesia. the IUCN classify this species as Data Deficient as this species, Andamia heteroptera and A reyii are confused and their exact distributions are uncertain.
