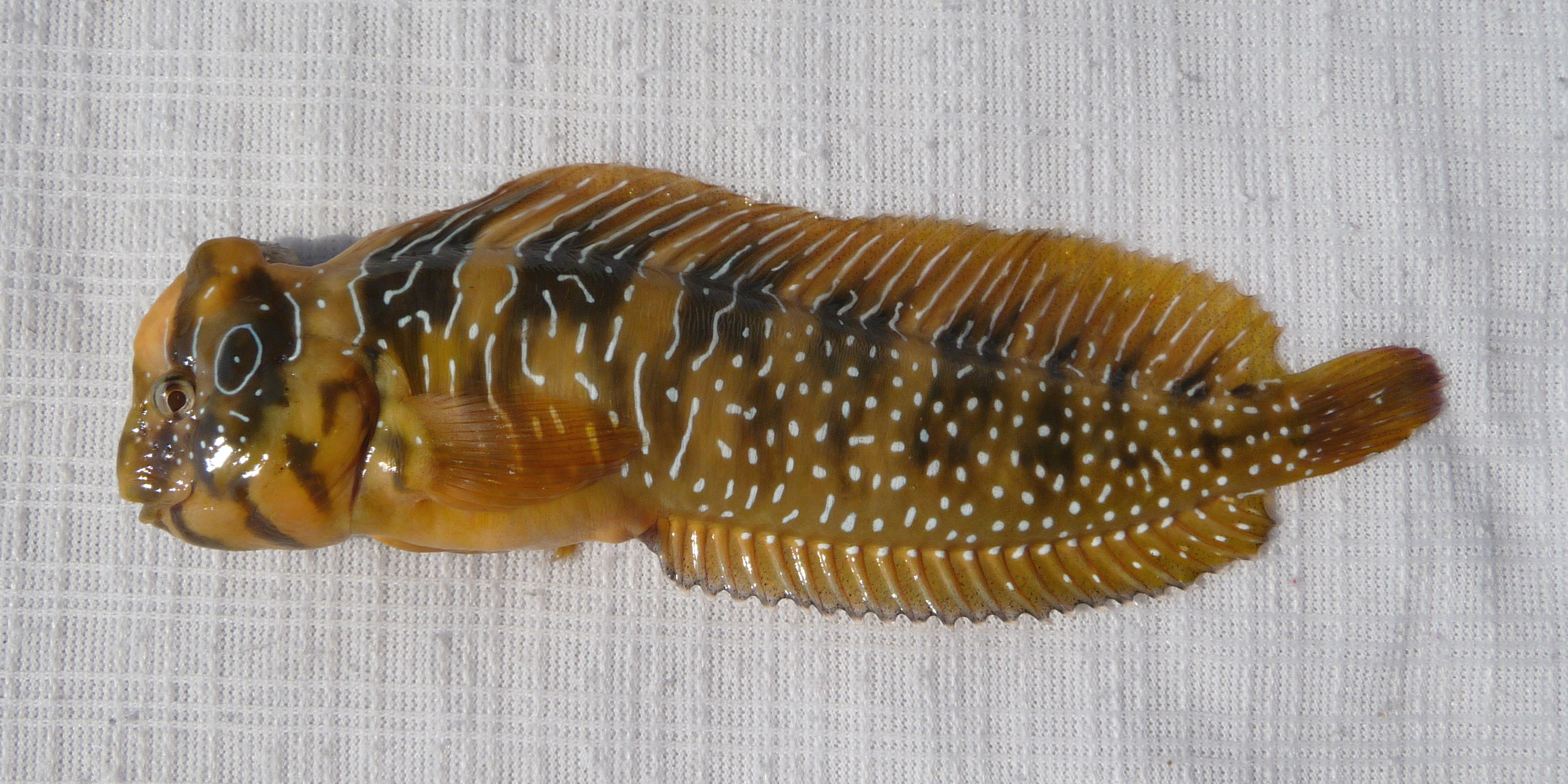
- Salaria pavo

Scientific classification
- Kingdom: Animalia
- Phylum: Chordata
- Class: Actinopterygii
- Division: Teleostei
- Order: Blenniiformes
- Family: Blenniidae
- Subfamily: Salariinae; Gill, 1859

= Salariinae =

Subfamily of fishes

Salariinae is one of two subfamilies in the combtooth blenny family Blenniidae, it is the largest of the two subfamilies in the Blennidae with 43 genera. The species in this subfamily are mainly marine, with a few species which are found in freshwater or brackish water, and a few species are known to spend much time out of the water.

== Classification ==
The Salariinae was formerly divided into at least two tribes, the Parablenniini and the Salariini, largely based on their dentition. However, the differences between these two tribes were not consistent, many taxa showed intermediate characteristics and it has been suggested that the subfamily should not be divided into tribes. Subject to further study, the Parablenniini and Salarinae should be treated as synonyms.

The following genera are classified as belonging to the Salariinae:

- Aidablennius Whitley, 1947
- Alloblennius Smith-Vaniz & Springer, 1971
- Alticus Lacépède, 1800
- Andamia Blyth, 1858
- Antennablennius Fowler, 1931
- Atrosalarias Whitley 1933
- Bathyblennius Bath, 1977
- Blenniella Reid, 1943
- Chalaroderma Norman, 1944
- Chasmodes Valenciennes, 1836
- Cirripectes Swainson, 1839
- Cirrisalarias Springer, 1976
- Coryphoblennius Norman, 1944
- Crossosalarias Smith-Vaniz & Springer, 1971
- Dodekablennos Springer & Spreitzer, 1978
- Ecsenius McCulloch, 1923
- Entomacrodus Gill, 1859
- Exallias Jordan & Evermann, 1905
- Glyptoparus J. L. B. Smith, 1959
- Hirculops J. L. B. Smith, 1959
- Hypleurochilus Gill, 1861
- Hypsoblennius Gill, 1861
- Istiblennius Whitley, 1943
- Lipophrys Gill, 1896
- Litobranchus Smith-Vaniz & Springer, 1971
- Lupinoblennius Herre, 1942
- Medusablennius Springer, 1966
- Microlipophrys Almada, Almada, Guillemaud & Wirtz, 2005
- Mimoblennius Smith-Vaniz & Springer, 1971
- Nannosalarias Smith-Vaniz & Springer, 1971
- Ophioblennius Gill, 1860
- Parablennius Miranda-Ribeiro, 1915
- Parahypsos Bath, 1982
- Paralticus Springer & Williams, 1994
- Pereulixia J. L. B. Smith, 1959
- Praealticus Schultz & Chapman, 1960
- Rhabdoblennius Whitley, 1930
- Salaria Forsskål, 1775
- Salarias Cuvier, 1816
- Salariopsis Vecchioni et al. 2022
- Scartella Jordan, 1886
- Scartichthys Jordan & Evermann, 1898
- Stanulus J. L. B. Smith, 1959
