= Antennablennius velifer =

Conservation status
- Data Deficient (IUCN 3.1)

Scientific classification
- Kingdom: Animalia
- Phylum: Chordata
- Class: Actinopterygii
- Order: Blenniiformes
- Family: Blenniidae
- Genus: Antennablennius
- Species: A. velifer

Binomial name
- Antennablennius velifer J. L. B. Smith, 1959

Species of fish

Antennablennius velifer is a species of combtooth blenny which is found in the western Indian Ocean. Some authorities regard this taxon as a junior synonym of Antennablennius variopunctatus.
