= Chalaroderma capito =

Conservation status
- Least Concern (IUCN 3.1)

Scientific classification
- Kingdom: Animalia
- Phylum: Chordata
- Class: Actinopterygii
- Order: Blenniiformes
- Family: Blenniidae
- Genus: Chalaroderma
- Species: C. capito

Binomial name
- Chalaroderma capito (Valenciennes, 1836)

Synonyms
- Blennius capito Valenciennes, 1836

Species of fish

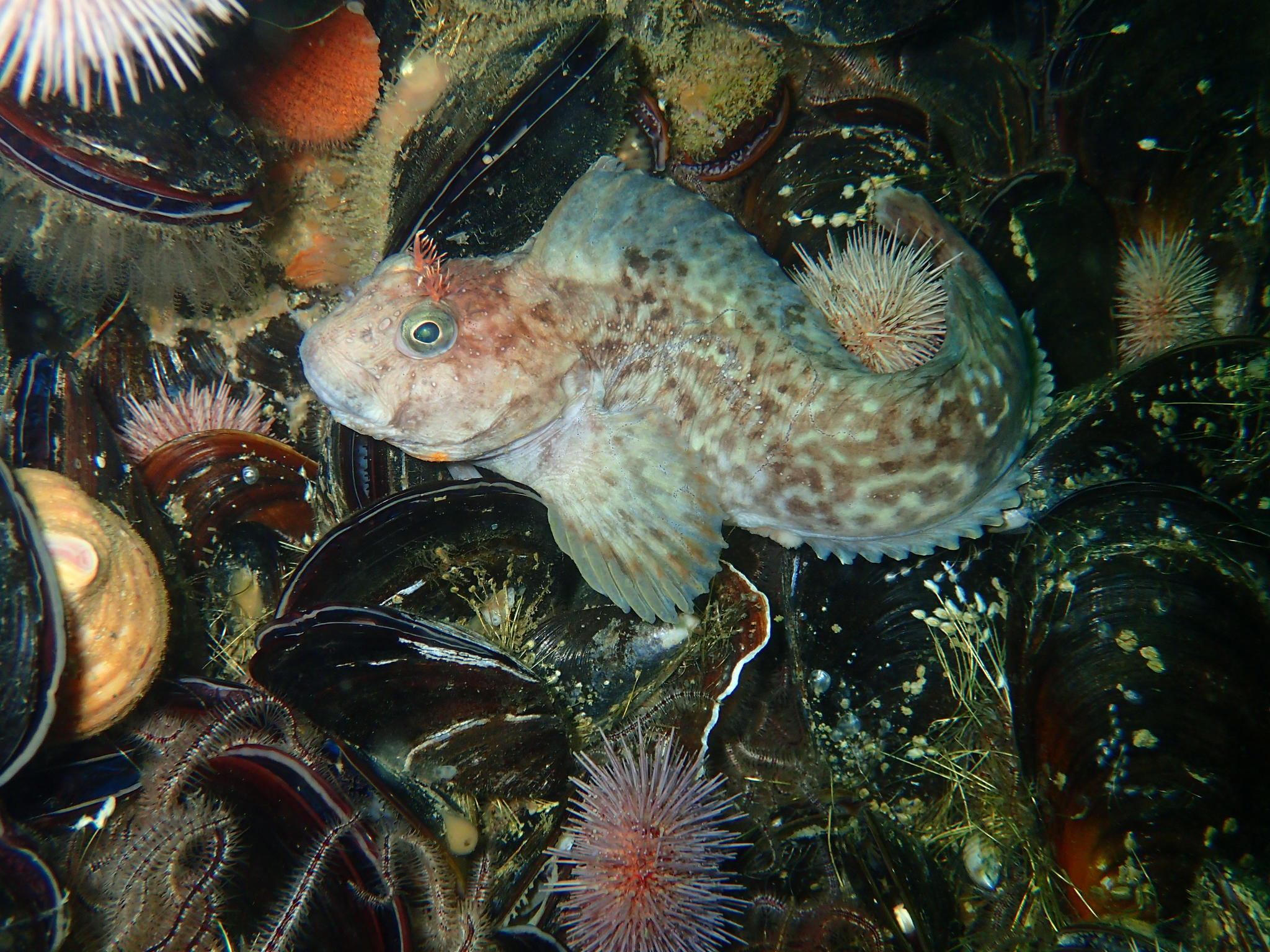
Chalaroderma capito

Chalaroderma capito, the looseskin blenny, is a species of combtooth blenny found in the south Atlantic ocean where it is found from Saldanha Bay to East London in South Africa. This species reaches a length of 20 centimetres (7.9 in) SL.
