= Atrosalarias hosokawai =

Conservation status
- Least Concern (IUCN 3.1)

Scientific classification
- Kingdom: Animalia
- Phylum: Chordata
- Class: Actinopterygii
- Order: Blenniiformes
- Family: Blenniidae
- Genus: Atrosalarias
- Species: A. hosokawai

Binomial name
- Atrosalarias hosokawai T. Suzuki & Senou, 1999

Species of fish

Atrosalarias hosokawai is a species of combtooth blenny found in coral reefs in the western Pacific Ocean, from Japan to Papua New Guinea. It can reach a maximum length of 74 millimetres (2.9 in) SL.
