= Lupinoblennius paivai =

Conservation status
- Endangered (IUCN 3.1)

Scientific classification
- Kingdom: Animalia
- Phylum: Chordata
- Class: Actinopterygii
- Order: Blenniiformes
- Family: Blenniidae
- Genus: Lupinoblennius
- Species: L. paivai

Binomial name
- Lupinoblennius paivai (S. Y. Pinto, 1958)

Synonyms
- Blennius paivai Pinto, 1958

Species of fish

Lupinoblennius paivai, Paiva's blenny, is a species of combtooth blenny endemic to a small area Brazil from Bahia to Santa Catarina where its habitat is the tidal reaches of coastal streams and small rivers. This species can grow to a length of 5.1 centimetres (2.0 in) SL. The specific name honours the Brazilian oceanographer João de Paiva Carvalho (1903-1961) of the Instituto Oceanográfico da Universidade de São Paulo in recognition of his cooperation with Pinto.
