= Antennablennius sexfasciatus =

Conservation status
- Data Deficient (IUCN 3.1)

Scientific classification
- Kingdom: Animalia
- Phylum: Chordata
- Class: Actinopterygii
- Order: Blenniiformes
- Family: Blenniidae
- Genus: Antennablennius
- Species: A. sexfasciatus

Binomial name
- Antennablennius sexfasciatus von Bonde, 1923

Synonyms

Species of fish

Antennablennius sexfasciatus is a species of combtooth blenny which is found in the south western Indian Ocean off South Africa.
