= Mimoblennius lineathorax =

Conservation status
- Vulnerable (IUCN 3.1)

Scientific classification
- Kingdom: Animalia
- Phylum: Chordata
- Class: Actinopterygii
- Order: Blenniiformes
- Family: Blenniidae
- Genus: Mimoblennius
- Species: M. lineathorax

Binomial name
- Mimoblennius lineathorax R. Fricke, 1999

Species of fish

Mimoblennius lineathorax is a species of combtooth blenny found in the western Indian Ocean, around Réunion. This species grows to a length of 2.6 centimetres (1.0 in) SL.
