= Andamia cyclocheilus =

Conservation status
- Data Deficient (IUCN 3.1)

Scientific classification
- Kingdom: Animalia
- Phylum: Chordata
- Class: Actinopterygii
- Order: Blenniiformes
- Family: Blenniidae
- Genus: Andamia
- Species: A. cyclocheilus

Binomial name
- Andamia cyclocheilus M. C. W. Weber, 1909

Species of fish

Andamia cyclocheilus is a species of combtooth blenny which is known from a single specimen from Atjatuning, western New Guinea. The IUCN rate it as Data Deficient because its taxonomy is unclear. It is associated with reefs. The blennies are oviparous.
