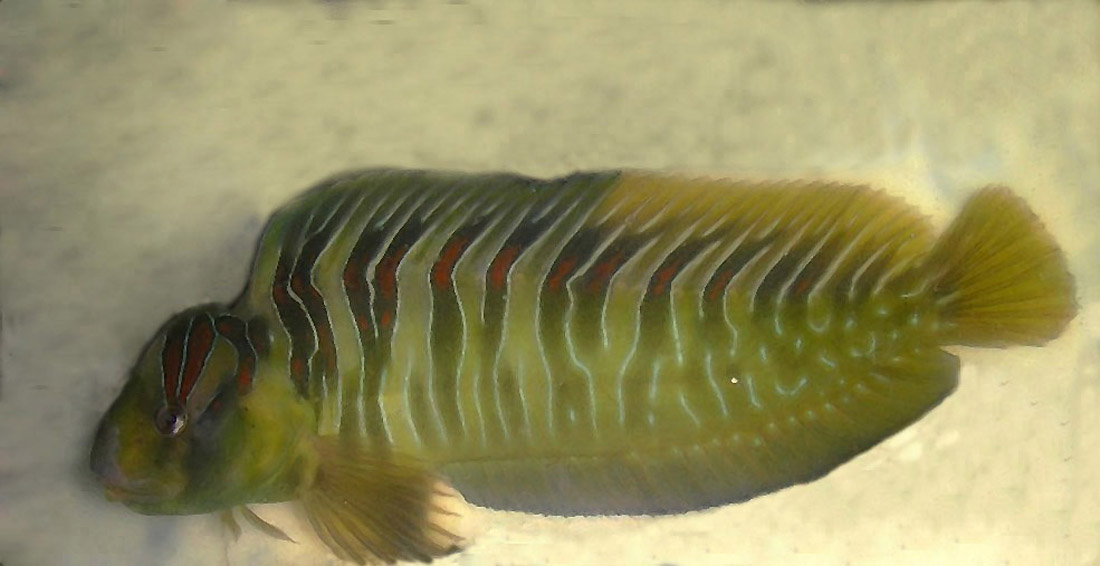

Conservation status
- Least Concern (IUCN 3.1)

Scientific classification
- Kingdom: Animalia
- Phylum: Chordata
- Class: Actinopterygii
- Order: Blenniiformes
- Family: Blenniidae
- Genus: Salaria
- Species: S. basilisca

Binomial name
- Salaria basilisca (Valenciennes, 1836)

Synonyms
- Blennius basiliscus Valenciennes, 1836; Lipophrys basiliscus (Valenciennes, 1836); Salaria basiliscus (Valenciennes, 1836)

= Salaria basilisca =

Species of fish

Salaria basilisca is a species of combtooth blenny found in the Mediterranean Sea near Tunisia and Turkey, also in the Adriatic Sea. This species reaches a length of 18 centimetres (7.1 in) TL. It is found among seagrass, sometimes where there is a rocky substrate. The male guards the eggs produced by several females. They are protogynous hermaphrodites with individuals being females while young changing to males later.
