= Andamia pacifica =

Conservation status
- Least Concern (IUCN 3.1)

Scientific classification
- Kingdom: Animalia
- Phylum: Chordata
- Class: Actinopterygii
- Order: Blenniiformes
- Family: Blenniidae
- Genus: Andamia
- Species: A. pacifica

Binomial name
- Andamia pacifica Tomiyama, 1955

Species of fish

Andamia pacifica is a species of combtooth blenny which is found in the Kerama Islands near Okinawa, Japan and is probably distributed along the Ryukyu Island chain. It is oviparous, laying adhesive eggs on the substrate, forming distinct pairs.
