= Antennablennius ceylonensis =

Conservation status
- Least Concern (IUCN 3.1)

Scientific classification
- Kingdom: Animalia
- Phylum: Chordata
- Class: Actinopterygii
- Order: Blenniiformes
- Family: Blenniidae
- Genus: Antennablennius
- Species: A. ceylonensis

Binomial name
- Antennablennius ceylonensis Bath, 1983

Species of fish

Antennablennius ceylonensis is a species of combtooth blenny found in the Indian Ocean, around Sri Lanka.
