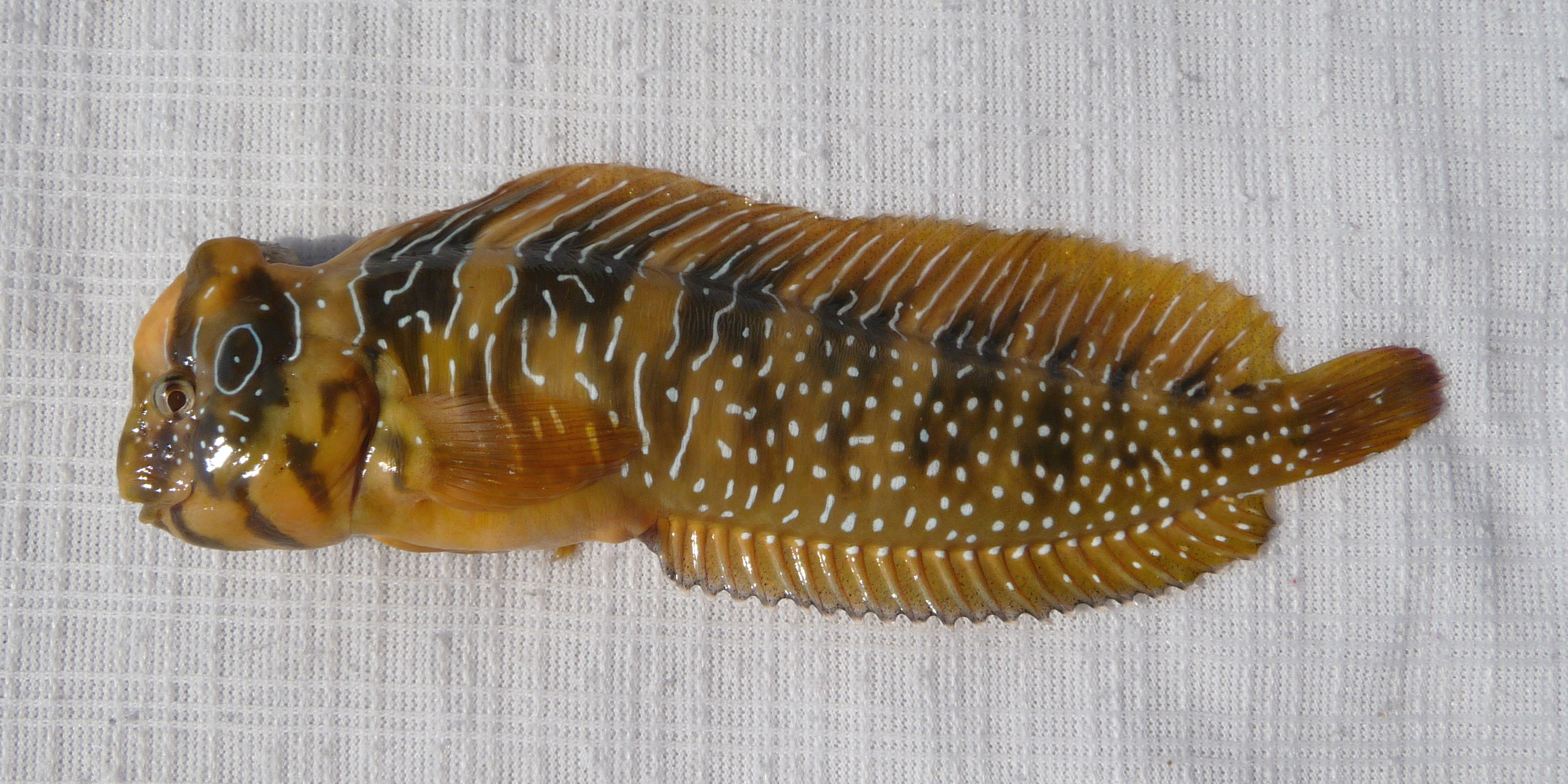
- Male
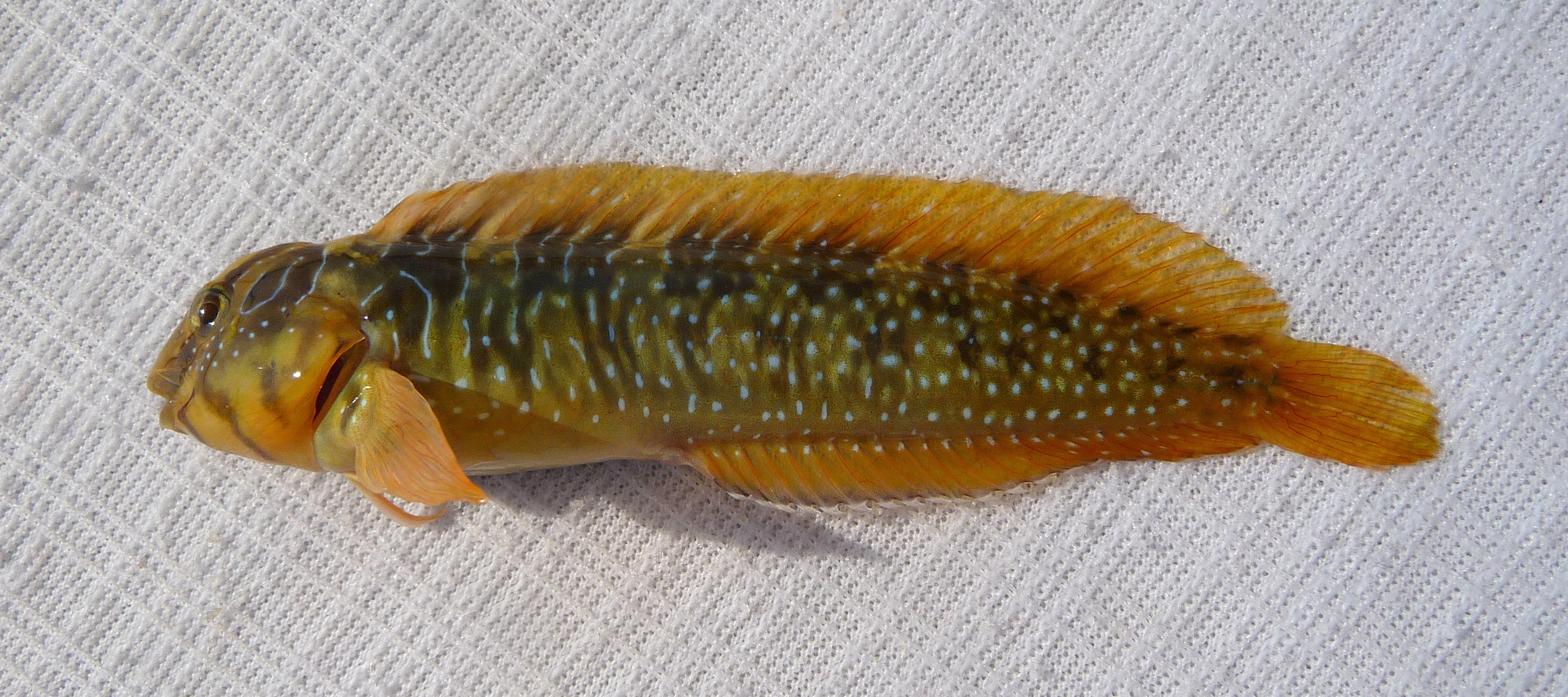
- Female

Conservation status
- Least Concern (IUCN 3.1)

Scientific classification
- Kingdom: Animalia
- Phylum: Chordata
- Class: Actinopterygii
- Division: Teleostei
- Order: Blenniiformes
- Family: Blenniidae
- Genus: Salaria
- Species: S. pavo

Binomial name
- Salaria pavo (Risso, 1810)

Synonyms
- Blennius pavo Risso, 1810; Lipophrys pavo (Risso, 1810)

= Peacock blenny =

Species of fish (Salaria pavo)

Salaria pavo, the peacock blenny, is a species of combtooth blenny found in the eastern Atlantic coast from France to Morocco; also in the Mediterranean Sea, Black Sea and the eastern Adriatic Sea. This species has colonised the northern Red Sea by anti-Lessepsian migration through the Suez Canal. The peacock blenny reaches a length of 13 centimetres (5.1 in) TL. The peacock blenny have unique reproductive behaviors. Bourgeois males typically build and guard nests. Sneaker males will mimic female behaviors in order to approach nests and fertilize eggs.
