= Mimoblennius rusi =

Conservation status
- Least Concern (IUCN 3.1)

Scientific classification
- Kingdom: Animalia
- Phylum: Chordata
- Class: Actinopterygii
- Order: Blenniiformes
- Family: Blenniidae
- Genus: Mimoblennius
- Species: M. rusi

Binomial name
- Mimoblennius rusi V. G. Springer & Spreitzer, 1978

Species of fish

Mimoblennius rusi, the Rusi blenny, is a species of combtooth blenny found in the western Indian Ocean. This species grows to a length of 4 centimetres (1.6 in) SL. The specific name is an acronym which stands for the J. L. B. Smith Institute of Ichthyology, Rhodes University where the holotype and paratypes are retained.
