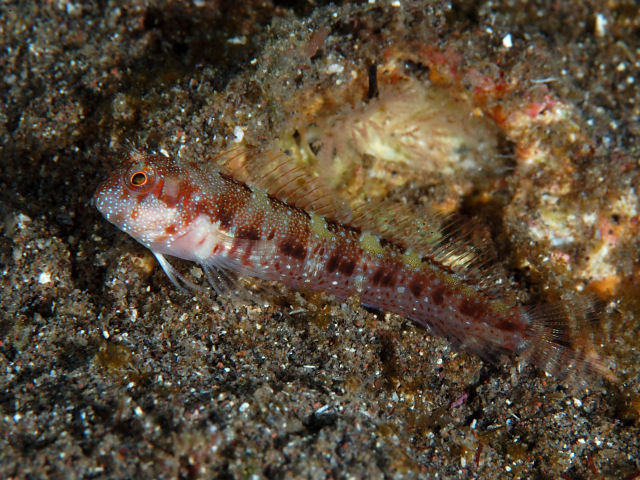

Conservation status
- Least Concern (IUCN 3.1)

Scientific classification
- Kingdom: Animalia
- Phylum: Chordata
- Class: Actinopterygii
- Order: Blenniiformes
- Family: Blenniidae
- Genus: Mimoblennius
- Species: M. atrocinctus

Binomial name
- Mimoblennius atrocinctus (Regan, 1909)

Synonyms
- Blennius atrocinctus Regan, 1909

= Mimoblennius atrocinctus =

Species of fish

Mimoblennius atrocinctus, the banded blenny, is a species of combtooth blenny found in the western Pacific and eastern Indian oceans. This species grows to a length of 5 centimetres (2.0 in) TL.

This is a rare species in which the adults live along rocky coastline to a depth of 10 metres (33 ft) where they inhabit the abandoned tubes created by worms either alone or in loose aggregations. Their eggs are demersal and adhere to the substrate by an adhesive pad or pedestal which is filamentous. The larvae are planktonic and are frequently recorded from shallow waters near the coast.

It has been recorded from the Indian Ocean off Sri Lanka and Christmas Island while in the western Pacific it has been recorded and from southern Japan to Hong Kong. It has also been recorded from northern Sulawesi and northern Australia.
