= Lupinoblennius nicholsi =

Conservation status
- Least Concern (IUCN 3.1)

Scientific classification
- Kingdom: Animalia
- Phylum: Chordata
- Class: Actinopterygii
- Order: Blenniiformes
- Family: Blenniidae
- Genus: Lupinoblennius
- Species: L. nicholsi

Binomial name
- Lupinoblennius nicholsi (Tavolga, 1954)

Synonyms
- Blennius nicholsi Tavolga, 1954

Species of fish

Lupinoblennius nicholsi, the highfin blenny, is a species of combtooth blenny found in the western Atlantic ocean, on the coasts of the Gulf of Mexico in north-eastern Mexico and Texas, it has also been recorded from Englewood, Florida. This species reaches a length of 6 centimetres (2.4 in) TL. The specific name honours the American ichthyologist John Treadwell Nichols (1883-1958).
