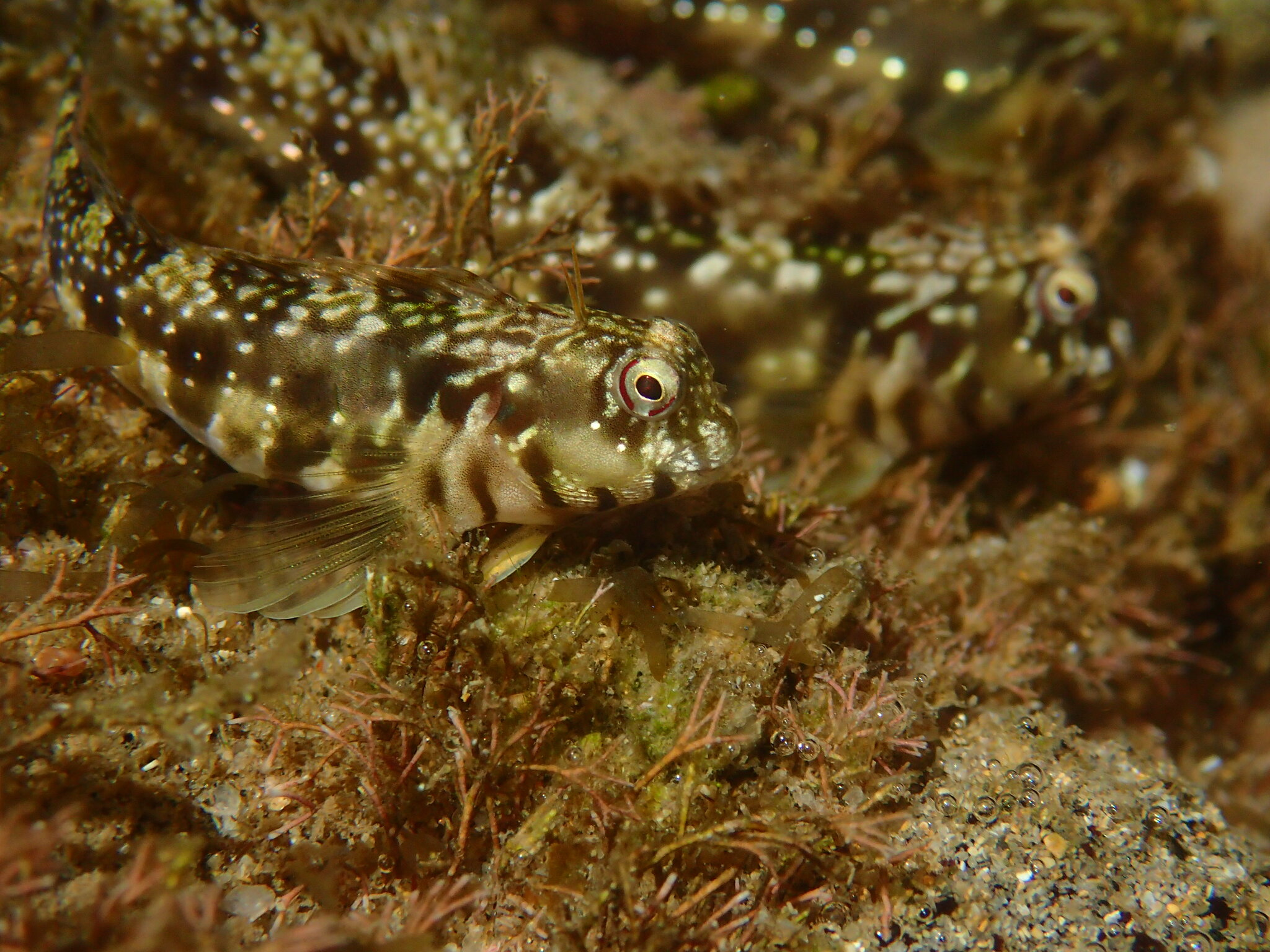

Conservation status
- Least Concern (IUCN 3.1)

Scientific classification
- Kingdom: Animalia
- Phylum: Chordata
- Class: Actinopterygii
- Order: Blenniiformes
- Family: Blenniidae
- Genus: Antennablennius
- Species: A. bifilum

Binomial name
- Antennablennius bifilum (Günther, 1861)

Synonyms
- Blennius bifilum Günther, 1861; Blennius persicus Regan, 1905; Croaltus bifilum (Günther, 1861)

= Antennablennius bifilum =

Species of fish

Antennablennius bifilum, the horned rockskipper, is a species of combtooth blenny found in the western Indian Ocean.

Like other similar species, its eggs are oviparous (eggs develop outside the female), and its range is from the Persian Gulf to South Africa.
