= A. amphibius =

A. amphibius may refer to:

- Arvicola amphibius, a species of mammal
- Andamia amphibius, a species of fish
