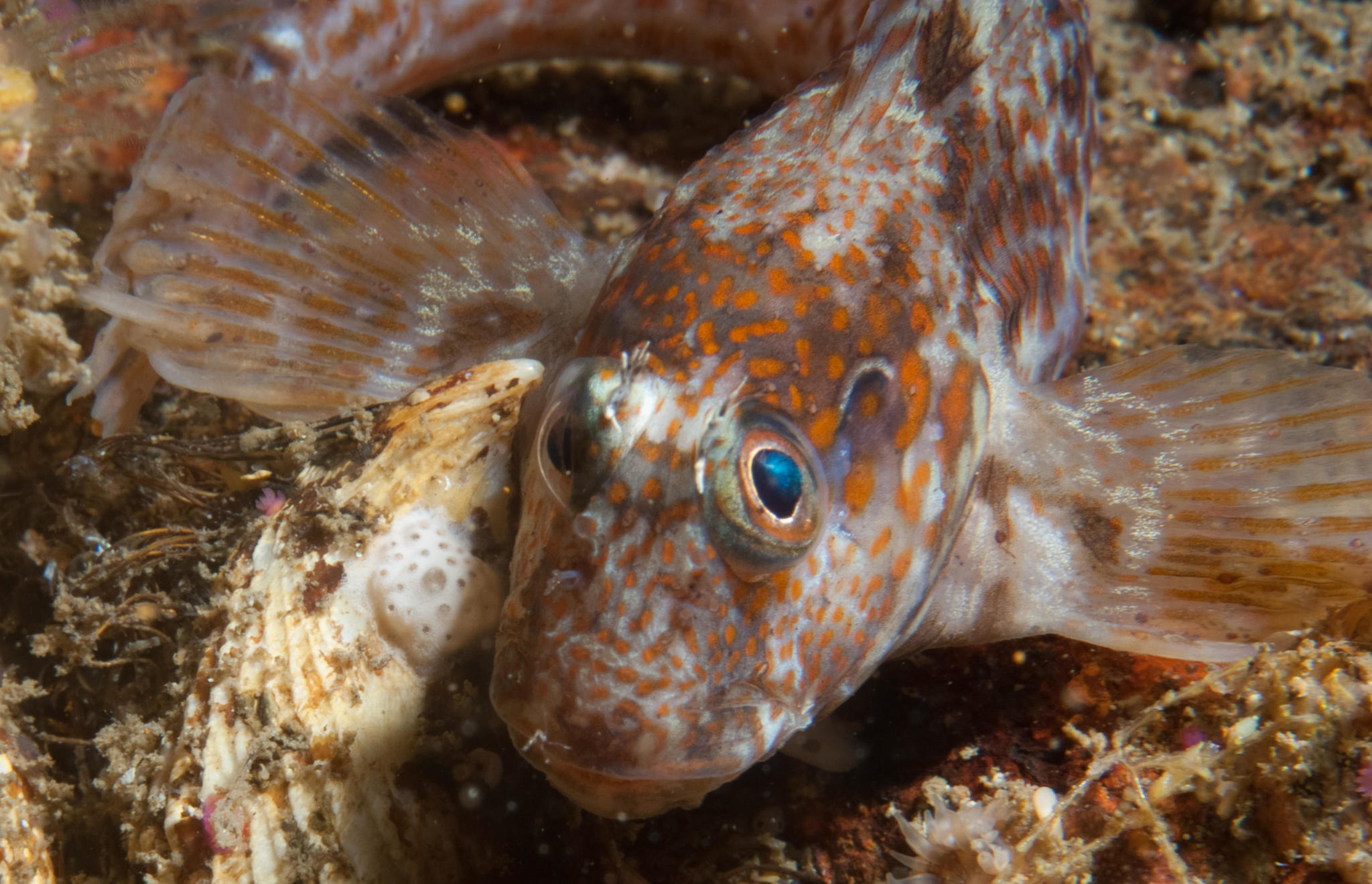
- Meiacanthus atrodorsalis

Conservation status
- Least Concern (IUCN 3.1)

Scientific classification
- Kingdom: Animalia
- Phylum: Chordata
- Class: Actinopterygii
- Order: Blenniiformes
- Family: Blenniidae
- Genus: Chalaroderma
- Species: C. ocellata

Binomial name
- Chalaroderma ocellata (Gilchrist & W. W. Thompson, 1908)

Synonyms
- Blennius ocellatus Gilchrist & Thompson, 1908

= Chalaroderma ocellata =

Two-eyed blenny

Species of fish

Chalaroderma ocellata, the two-eyed blenny, is a species of combtooth blenny found in the southeast Atlantic ocean where it is known only from Saldanha Bay to Port Elizabeth in South Africa. This species reaches a length of 7 centimetres (2.8 in) SL.
