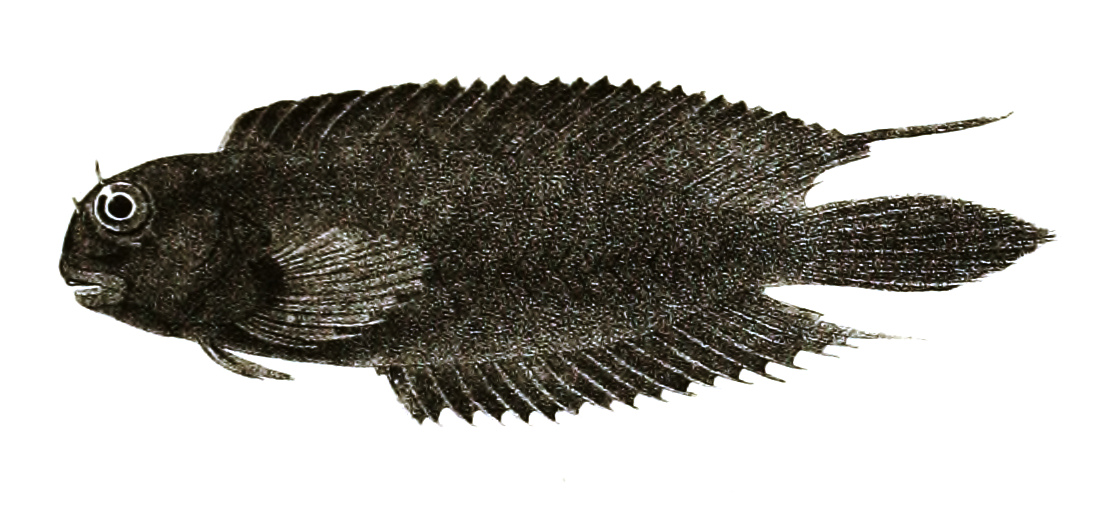

Conservation status
- Least Concern (IUCN 3.1)

Scientific classification
- Kingdom: Animalia
- Phylum: Chordata
- Class: Actinopterygii
- Order: Blenniiformes
- Family: Blenniidae
- Genus: Atrosalarias
- Species: A. fuscus

Binomial name
- Atrosalarias fuscus (Rüppell, 1838)

Synonyms
- Salarias fuscus Rüppell, 1838; Salarias niger Valenciennes, 1836; Salarias phaiosoma Bleeker, 1855; Salarias ruficaudas Valenciennes, 1836

= Atrosalarias fuscus =

Species of fish

Atrosalarias fuscus, also known as the dusky blenny, brown coral blenny or black blenny, is a species of marine fish in the family Blenniidae.

It is widespread throughout the tropical waters of the Indian Ocean, Red Sea included.

This fish is a small size that can reach a maximum size of 14.5 cm length.
