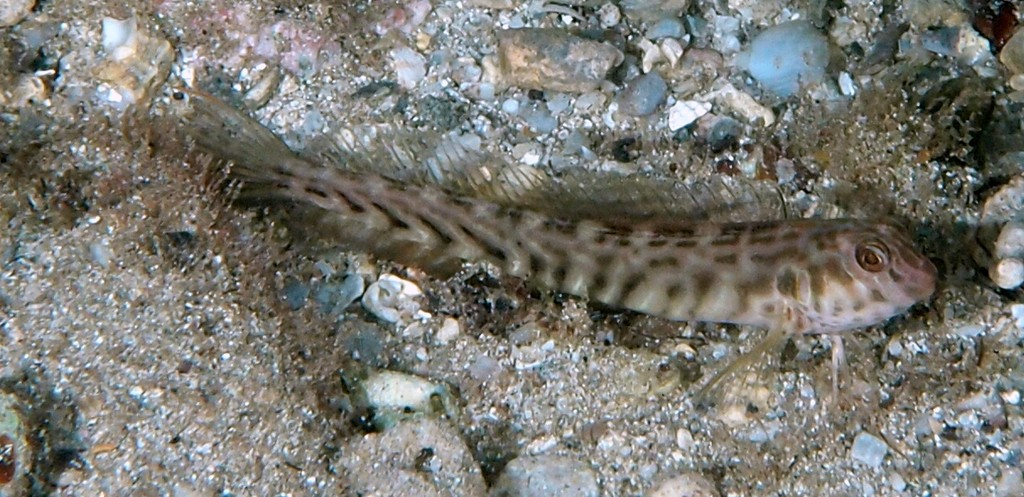

Conservation status
- Near Threatened (IUCN 3.1)

Scientific classification
- Kingdom: Animalia
- Phylum: Chordata
- Class: Actinopterygii
- Order: Blenniiformes
- Family: Blenniidae
- Genus: Lupinoblennius
- Species: L. vinctus

Binomial name
- Lupinoblennius vinctus (Poey, 1867)

Synonyms
- Blennius vinctus Poey, 1867; Lupinoblennius dispar Herre, 1942; Parablennius vinctus (Poey, 1867)

= Lupinoblennius vinctus =

Species of fish

Lupinoblennius vinctus, the mangrove blenny, is a species of combtooth blenny found in the western central Atlantic ocean, from southern Florida and the Antilles as well as from Mexico to Panama where it has reached the Pacific end of the Panama Canal. This species reaches a length of 3.7 centimetres (1.5 in) TL.
