= Antennablennius simonyi =

Conservation status
- Least Concern (IUCN 3.1)

Scientific classification
- Kingdom: Animalia
- Phylum: Chordata
- Class: Actinopterygii
- Order: Blenniiformes
- Family: Blenniidae
- Genus: Antennablennius
- Species: A. simonyi

Binomial name
- Antennablennius simonyi (Steindachner, 1902)

Synonyms
- Salarias simonyi Steindachner, 1902; Antennablennius girad Fraser-Brunner, 1951

Species of fish

Antennablennius simonyi, Simony's blenny, is a species of combtooth blenny found in the western Indian Ocean, from the Gulf of Aden to the Persian Gulf.

== Size ==
This species reaches a length of 26.0 cm (10.2 in).

== Etymology ==
The specific name honours the Austrian mathematician and entomologist Oskar Simony (1852-1915), who looked after the collection of fish specimen on an expedition to Socotra on which the type was collected.
