= Antennablennius adenensis =

Conservation status
- Least Concern (IUCN 3.1)

Scientific classification
- Kingdom: Animalia
- Phylum: Chordata
- Class: Actinopterygii
- Order: Blenniiformes
- Family: Blenniidae
- Genus: Antennablennius
- Species: A. adenensis

Binomial name
- Antennablennius adenensis Fraser-Brunner, 1951

Species of fish

Antennablennius adenensis, the Aden blenny, is a species of combtooth blenny found in the western Indian Ocean, from the Red Sea to the Persian Gulf and Pakistan.
