= Scartichthys viridis =

Conservation status
- Least Concern (IUCN 3.1)

Scientific classification
- Kingdom: Animalia
- Phylum: Chordata
- Class: Actinopterygii
- Order: Blenniiformes
- Family: Blenniidae
- Genus: Scartichthys
- Species: S. viridis

Binomial name
- Scartichthys viridis (Valenciennes, 1836)

Synonyms
- Salarias viridis Valenciennes, 1836; Salarias cuvieri (Günther, 1861); Blennophis semifasciatus (Kner & Steindachner, 1867); Salarias concolor (Philippi, 1896); Salarias modestus (Philippi, 1896); Salarias petersoni (Fowler, 1940)

Species of fish

Scartichthys viridis is a species of combtooth blenny found in the southeast Pacific ocean, from Peru to Chile. Members of this species feed primarily off of plants (including benthic algae and weeds), phytoplankton, amphipods, and mollusks. This species reaches a length of 19.7 centimetres (7.8 in) SL.
