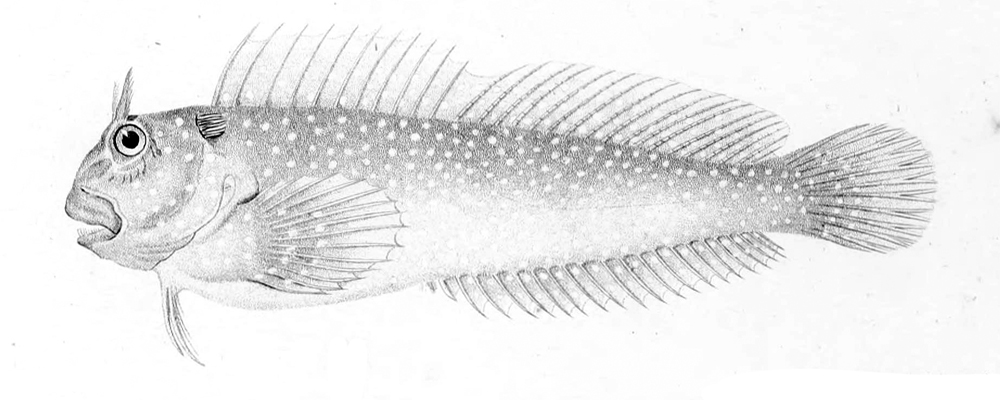

Conservation status
- Least Concern (IUCN 3.1)

Scientific classification
- Kingdom: Animalia
- Phylum: Chordata
- Class: Actinopterygii
- Order: Blenniiformes
- Family: Blenniidae
- Genus: Scartichthys
- Species: S. variolatus

Binomial name
- Scartichthys variolatus (Valenciennes, 1836)

Synonyms
- Salarias variolatus Valenciennes, 1836; Salarias rubropunctatus Valenciennes, 1836; Scartichthys rubropunctatus (Valenciennes, 1836); Ophioblennius fernandezensis (Clark, 1938); Scartichthys fernandezensis (Clark, 1938)

= Scartichthys variolatus =

Species of fish

Scartichthys variolatus is a species of combtooth blenny found around islands in the southeast Pacific ocean, the Desventuradas Islands and the Juan Fernandez Islands. This species reaches a length of 16.3 centimetres (6.4 in) SL.
