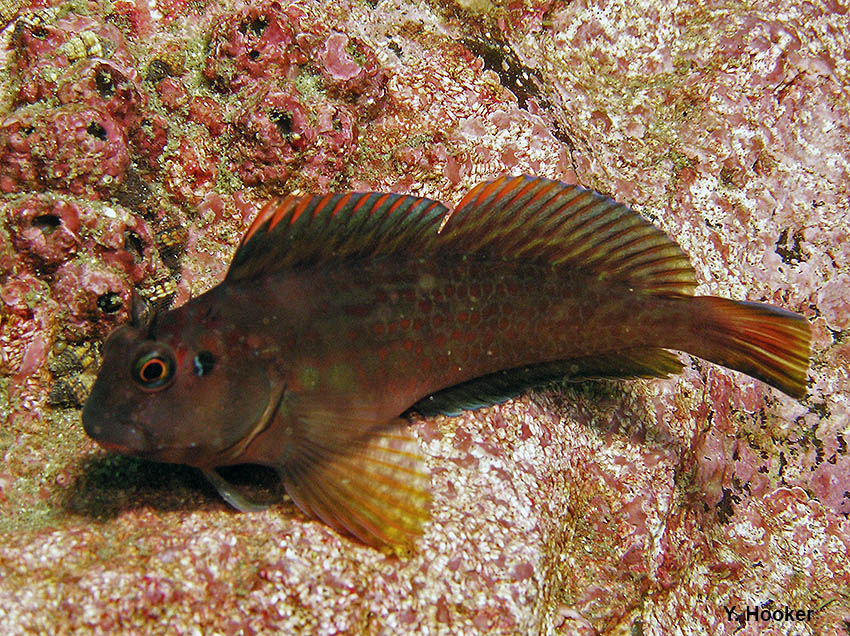

Conservation status
- Least Concern (IUCN 3.1)

Scientific classification
- Kingdom: Animalia
- Phylum: Chordata
- Class: Actinopterygii
- Order: Blenniiformes
- Family: Blenniidae
- Genus: Scartichthys
- Species: S. gigas

Binomial name
- Scartichthys gigas (Steindachner, 1876)

Synonyms
- Salarias gigas Steindachner, 1876; Salarias eques (Steindachner, 1898); Ophioblennius xiphiodon Clark, 1938; Scartichthys xiphiodon Clark, 1938; Ophioblennius mazorkae (Hildebrand, 1946)

= Scartichthys gigas =

Species of fish

Scartichthys gigas, the giant blenny, is a species of combtooth blenny found in the eastern Pacific ocean, from Panama to northern Chile. Members of this species feed primarily off of plants (including benthic algae and weeds), crustaceans, and small mollusks and they themselves are seldom caught for human consumption, as their meat is tasteless. It is said that they can be made into a mildly narcotic soup, therefore their Spanish name borrachilla (drunk). This species reaches a length of 22.2 centimetres (8.7 in) SL.
