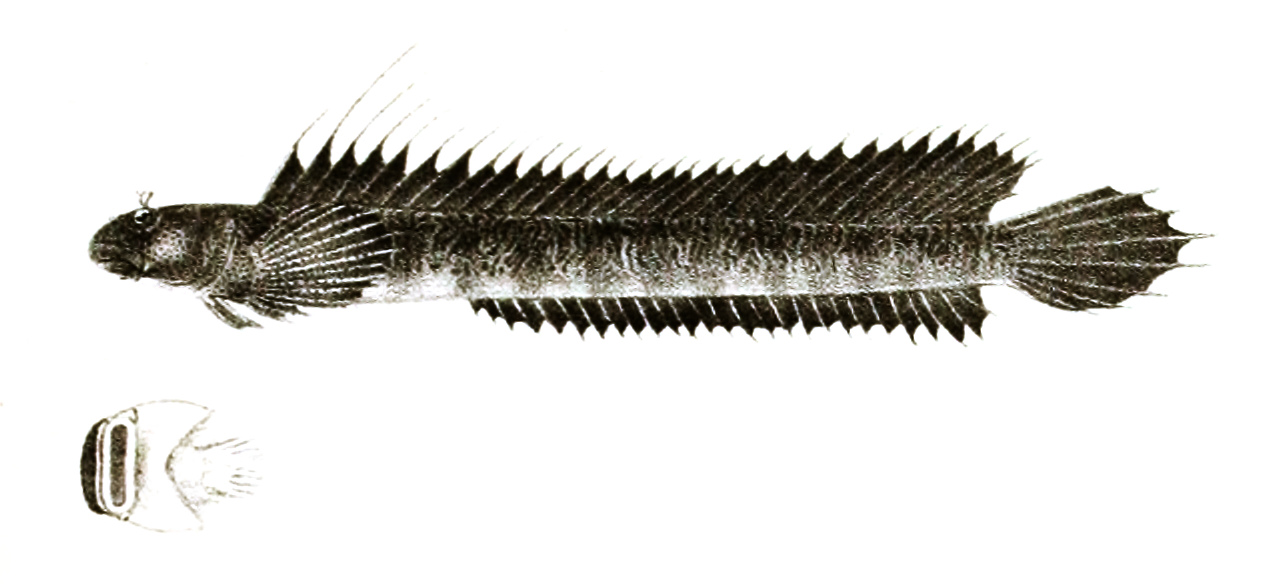

Conservation status
- Data Deficient (IUCN 3.1)

Scientific classification
- Kingdom: Animalia
- Phylum: Chordata
- Class: Actinopterygii
- Order: Blenniiformes
- Family: Blenniidae
- Genus: Andamia
- Species: A. expansa

Binomial name
- Andamia expansa Blyth, 1858

= Andamia expansa =

Species of fish

Andamia expansa is a species of combtooth blenny which is known from a few specimens from the eastern Indian Ocean, with the type being collected in the Andaman Islands. The IUCN rate it as Data Deficient because its taxonomy is unclear. It forms pairs and lays adhesive eggs on the substrates.
