= Mimoblennius cas =

Conservation status
- Least Concern (IUCN 3.1)

Scientific classification
- Kingdom: Animalia
- Phylum: Chordata
- Class: Actinopterygii
- Order: Blenniiformes
- Family: Blenniidae
- Genus: Mimoblennius
- Species: M. cas

Binomial name
- Mimoblennius cas V. G. Springer & Spreitzer, 1978

Species of fish

Mimoblennius cas is a species of combtooth blenny found in the western Indian Ocean, around Comoros. This species grows to a length of 3.2 centimetres (1.3 in) SL. The specific name is an acronym which stands for the California Academy of Sciences where the holotype and paratypes are retained.
