= Scartichthys crapulatus =

Conservation status
- Least Concern (IUCN 3.1)

Scientific classification
- Kingdom: Animalia
- Phylum: Chordata
- Class: Actinopterygii
- Order: Blenniiformes
- Family: Blenniidae
- Genus: Scartichthys
- Species: S. crapulatus

Binomial name
- Scartichthys crapulatus J. T. Williams, 1990

Species of fish

Scartichthys crapulatus is a species of combtooth blenny found in the southeast Pacific ocean, and is endemic to Chile. This species reaches a length of 11.6 centimetres (4.6 in) SL.

== Etymology ==
The species name "crapulatus" (Latin for "drunk") refers to the soporific effects of the consumption of Scartichthys flesh.
