= Atrosalarias holomelas =

Conservation status
- Least Concern (IUCN 3.1)

Scientific classification
- Kingdom: Animalia
- Phylum: Chordata
- Class: Actinopterygii
- Order: Blenniiformes
- Family: Blenniidae
- Genus: Atrosalarias
- Species: A. holomelas

Binomial name
- Atrosalarias holomelas (Günther, 1872)

Synonyms
- Salarias holomelas Günther, 1872

Species of fish

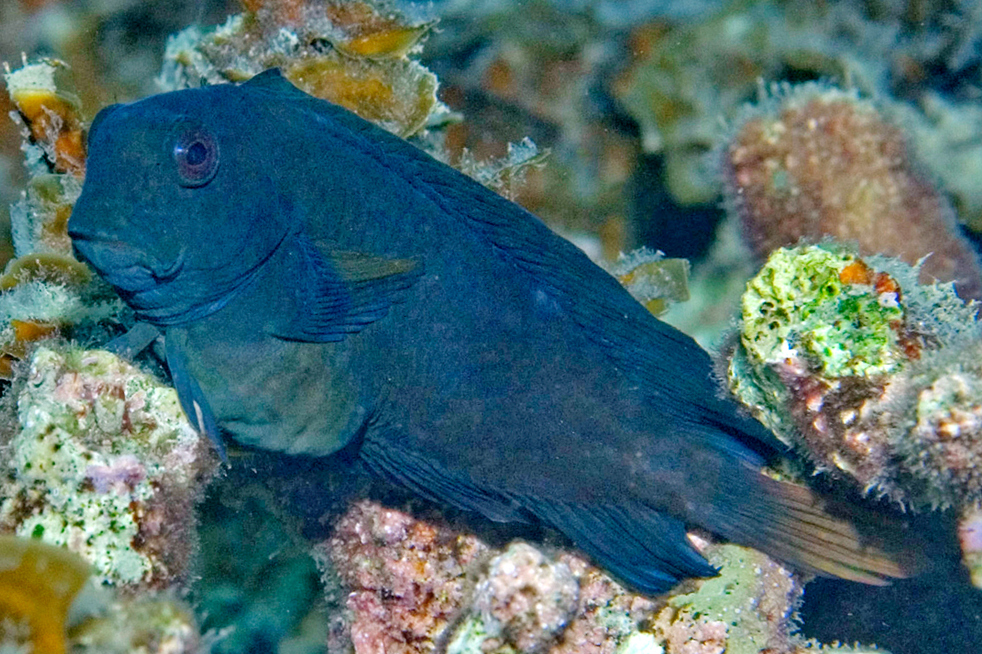
A Dusky Blenny, Atrosalarias holomelas, at Great Keppel Island, Great Barrier Reef, Queensland.

Atrosalarias holomelas, the brown coral blenny, is a species of combtooth blenny native to coral reefs of the southwestern central Pacific Ocean. It grows to a length of 14.5 centimetres (5.7 in) and can be found in the aquarium trade.
