= Antennablennius hypenetes =

Conservation status
- Least Concern (IUCN 3.1)

Scientific classification
- Kingdom: Animalia
- Phylum: Chordata
- Class: Actinopterygii
- Order: Blenniiformes
- Family: Blenniidae
- Genus: Antennablennius
- Species: A. hypenetes

Binomial name
- Antennablennius hypenetes (Klunzinger, 1871)

Species of fish

Antennablennius hypenetes, the Arabian blenny, is a species of combtooth blenny found in the western Indian Ocean, from the northern Red Sea to the Persian Gulf.
