= Antennablennius australis =

Conservation status
- Least Concern (IUCN 3.1)

Scientific classification
- Kingdom: Animalia
- Phylum: Chordata
- Class: Actinopterygii
- Order: Blenniiformes
- Family: Blenniidae
- Genus: Antennablennius
- Species: A. australis

Binomial name
- Antennablennius australis Fraser-Brunner, 1951

Species of fish

Antennablennius australis, the moustached blenny, is a species of combtooth blenny found in the western Indian Ocean.
