= Andamia reyi =

Conservation status
- Least Concern (IUCN 3.1)

Scientific classification
- Kingdom: Animalia
- Phylum: Chordata
- Class: Actinopterygii
- Order: Blenniiformes
- Family: Blenniidae
- Genus: Andamia
- Species: A. reyi

Binomial name
- Andamia reyi (Sauvage, 1880)

Synonyms
- Salarias reyi Sauvage, 1880; Andamia raoi Hora, 1938

Species of fish

Andamia reyi, the suckerlip blenny, is a species of combtooth blenny found in coral reefs in the Pacific and Indian Oceans.

== Size ==
This species reaches a length of 10.0 cm (3.9 in) TL.

== Etymology ==
The specific name honours the collector of the type, the French doctor Paul Rey.
