= Dodekablennos fraseri =

Conservation status
- Least Concern (IUCN 3.1)

Scientific classification
- Kingdom: Animalia
- Phylum: Chordata
- Class: Actinopterygii
- Division: Teleostei
- Order: Blenniiformes
- Family: Blenniidae
- Subfamily: Salariinae
- Genus: Dodekablennos
- Species: D. fraseri

Binomial name
- Dodekablennos fraseri V. G. Springer & Spreitzer, 1978

Species of fish

Dodekablennos fraseri is a species of combtooth blenny found in the western Indian Ocean, around the islands of Réunion and Mauritius. This species is a resident of tide pools, where it can be found at depths of from 0 to 2 metres (0.0 to 6.6 ft). D. fraseri is the only known member of its genus. Its specific name honours Thomas H. Fraser of the Mote Marine Laboratory who collected the type.
