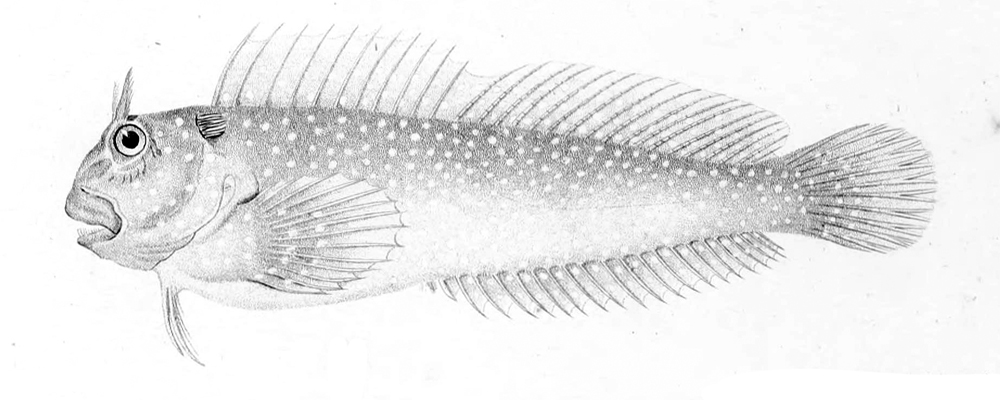
- S. variolatus

Scientific classification
- Kingdom: Animalia
- Phylum: Chordata
- Class: Actinopterygii
- Order: Blenniiformes
- Family: Blenniidae
- Subfamily: Salariinae
- Genus: Scartichthys; D. S. Jordan & Evermann, 1898

Type species
- Salarias rubropunctatus Valenciennes, 1836

= Scartichthys =

Genus of fishes

Scartichthys is a genus of combtooth blennies found in the Atlantic and Indian Ocean.

== Species ==
There are currently four recognized species in this genus:

- Scartichthys crapulatus J. T. Williams, 1990
- Scartichthys gigas (Steindachner, 1876) (Giant blenny)
- Scartichthys variolatus (Valenciennes, 1836)
- Scartichthys viridis (Valenciennes, 1836)
