= Andamia heteroptera =

Conservation status
- Data Deficient (IUCN 3.1)

Scientific classification
- Kingdom: Animalia
- Phylum: Chordata
- Class: Actinopterygii
- Order: Blenniiformes
- Family: Blenniidae
- Genus: Andamia
- Species: A. heteroptera

Binomial name
- Andamia heteroptera (Bleeker, 1857)

Synonyms
- Salarias heteropterus Bleeker, 1857; Salarias heteroptera Bleeker, 1857

Species of fish

The East Indian lipsucker, Andamia heteroptera is a species of combtooth blenny found in the eastern Indian Ocean, around Christmas Island.

== Size ==
This species reaches a maximum length of 6.4 centimetres (2.5 in) SL.
