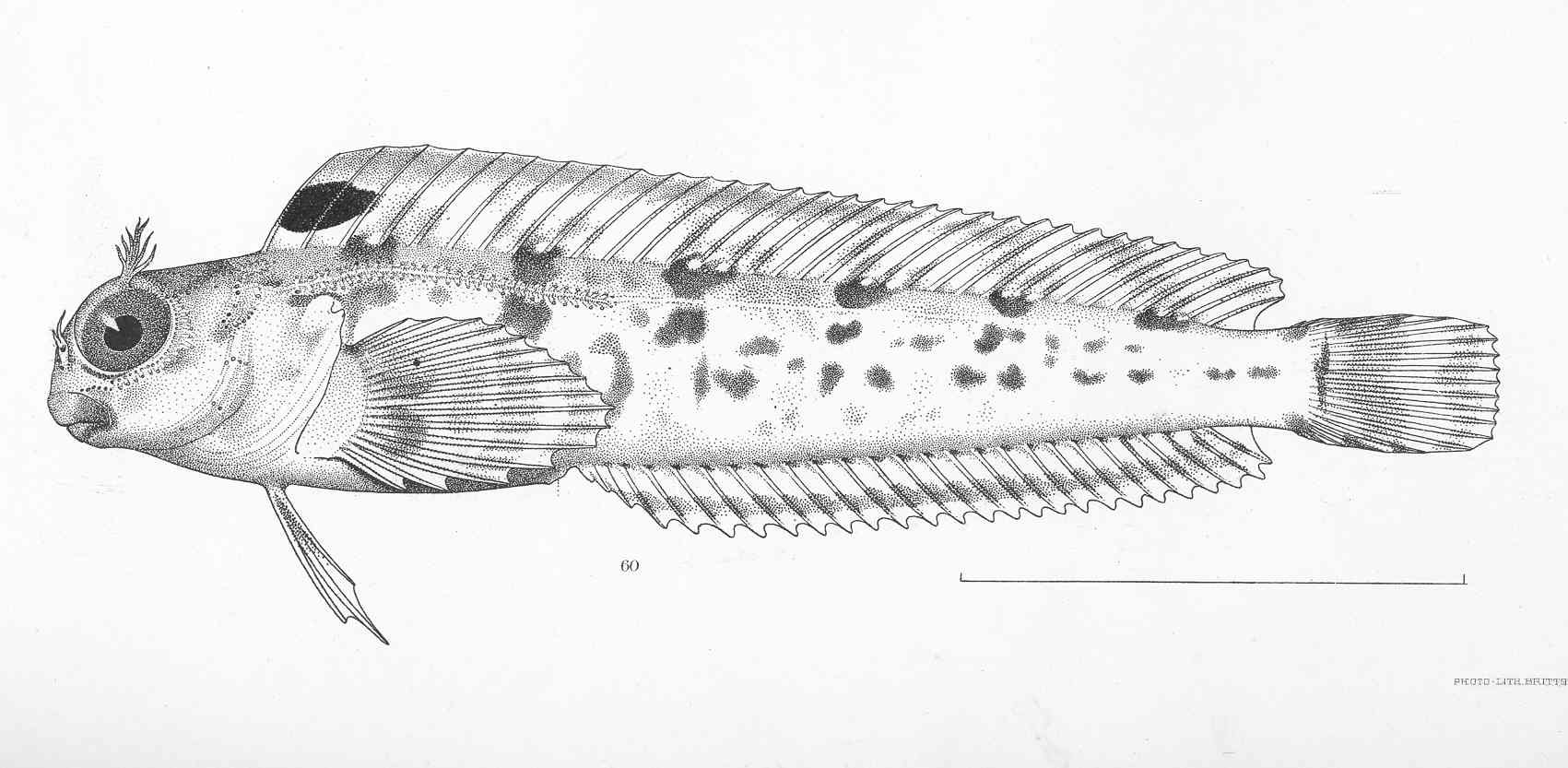

Conservation status
- Least Concern (IUCN 3.1)

Scientific classification
- Kingdom: Animalia
- Phylum: Chordata
- Class: Actinopterygii
- Order: Blenniiformes
- Family: Blenniidae
- Subfamily: Salariinae
- Genus: Parahypsos; Bath, 1982
- Species: P. piersoni

Binomial name
- Parahypsos piersoni (C. H. Gilbert & Starks, 1904)

Synonyms
- Hypsoblennius piersoni Gilbert & Starks, 1904

= Parahypsos =

Species of fish

Parahypsos piersoni is a species of combtooth blenny found in coral reefs in the eastern Pacific ocean, from Costa Rica to Peru. The specific name honours C.J. Pierson, who was a member of the expedition to Panama on which the type was collected.
