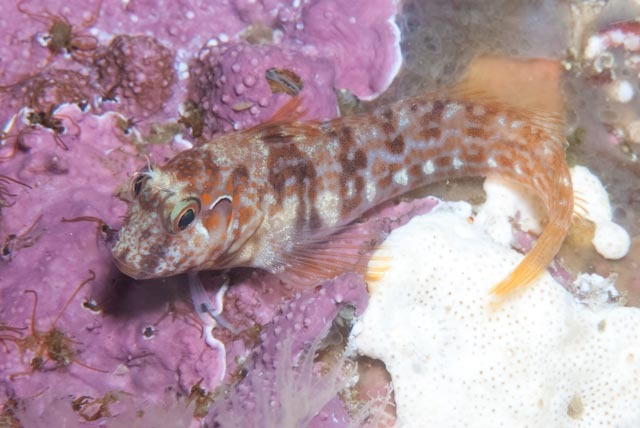
- Chalaroderma ocellata

Scientific classification
- Kingdom: Animalia
- Phylum: Chordata
- Class: Actinopterygii
- Order: Blenniiformes
- Family: Blenniidae
- Subfamily: Salariinae
- Genus: Chalaroderma; Norman, 1944

Type species
- Blennius capito Valenciennes, 1836

= Chalaroderma =

Genus of fishes

Chalaroderma is a genus of combtooth blennies found in the southeast Atlantic ocean.

== Species ==
There are currently two recognized species in this genus:

- Chalaroderma capito (Valenciennes, 1836) (Looseskin blenny)
- Chalaroderma ocellata (Gilchrist & W. W. Thompson, 1908) (Two-eyed blenny)
