= Glyptoparus delicatulus =

Conservation status
- Least Concern (IUCN 3.1)

Scientific classification
- Kingdom: Animalia
- Phylum: Chordata
- Class: Actinopterygii
- Order: Blenniiformes
- Family: Blenniidae
- Subfamily: Salariinae
- Genus: Glyptoparus
- Species: G. delicatulus

Binomial name
- Glyptoparus delicatulus J. L. B. Smith, 1959

Species of fish

Glyptoparus delicatulus, the delicate blenny, is a species of combtooth blenny found in coral reefs in the western Pacific and Indian Oceans. This species reaches a length of 5 centimetres (2.0 in) TL. It can be found in the aquarium trade. This is the only known species in its genus.
