= Lupinoblennius =

Scientific classification
- Kingdom: Animalia
- Phylum: Chordata
- Class: Actinopterygii
- Order: Blenniiformes
- Family: Blenniidae
- Subfamily: Salariinae
- Genus: Lupinoblennius; Herre, 1942

Type species
- Lupinoblennius dispar Herre, 1942

Genus of fishes

Lupinoblennius is a genus of combtooth blennies found in the western Atlantic Ocean.

== Species ==
There are currently three recognized species in this genus:

- Lupinoblennius nicholsi (Tavolga, 1954) (Highfin blenny)
- Lupinoblennius paivai (S. Y. Pinto, 1958) (Paiva's blenny)
- Lupinoblennius vinctus (Poey, 1867) (Mangrove blenny)
