= Paralticus amboinensis =

Conservation status
- Least Concern (IUCN 3.1)

Scientific classification
- Kingdom: Animalia
- Phylum: Chordata
- Class: Actinopterygii
- Order: Blenniiformes
- Family: Blenniidae
- Subfamily: Salarinae
- Genus: Paralticus; V. G. Springer & J. T. Williams, 1994
- Species: P. amboinensis

Binomial name
- Paralticus amboinensis (Bleeker, 1857)

Synonyms
- Salarias amboinensis Bleeker, 1857; Praealticus amboinensis (Bleeker, 1857); Salarias goesii Bleeker, 1859

Species of fish

Paralticus amboinensis, the Ambon rockskipper or the big-nose blenny, is a species of combtooth blenny found in the western central Pacific Ocean. This species reaches a length of 16 centimetres (6.3 in) TL. It is currently the only known member of its genus.
