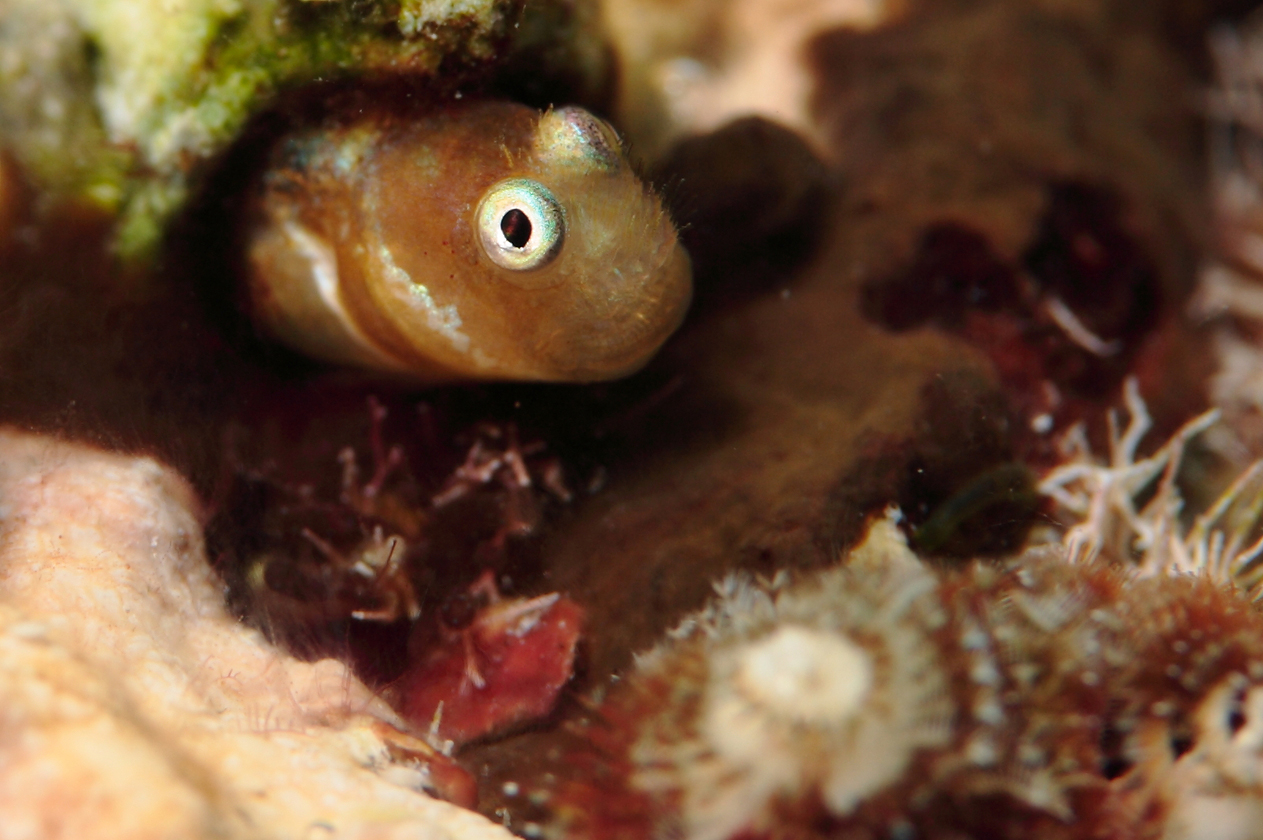

Conservation status
- Least Concern (IUCN 3.1)

Scientific classification
- Kingdom: Animalia
- Phylum: Chordata
- Class: Actinopterygii
- Order: Blenniiformes
- Family: Blenniidae
- Subfamily: Salarinae
- Genus: Cirrisalarias
- Species: C. bunares

Binomial name
- Cirrisalarias bunares V. G. Springer, 1976

= Cirrisalarias bunares =

Species of fish

Cirrisalarias bunares, the hairy blenny or medusa blenny, is a species of combtooth blenny found in the western central Pacific and Indian Oceans. This species is the only known member of its genus.
