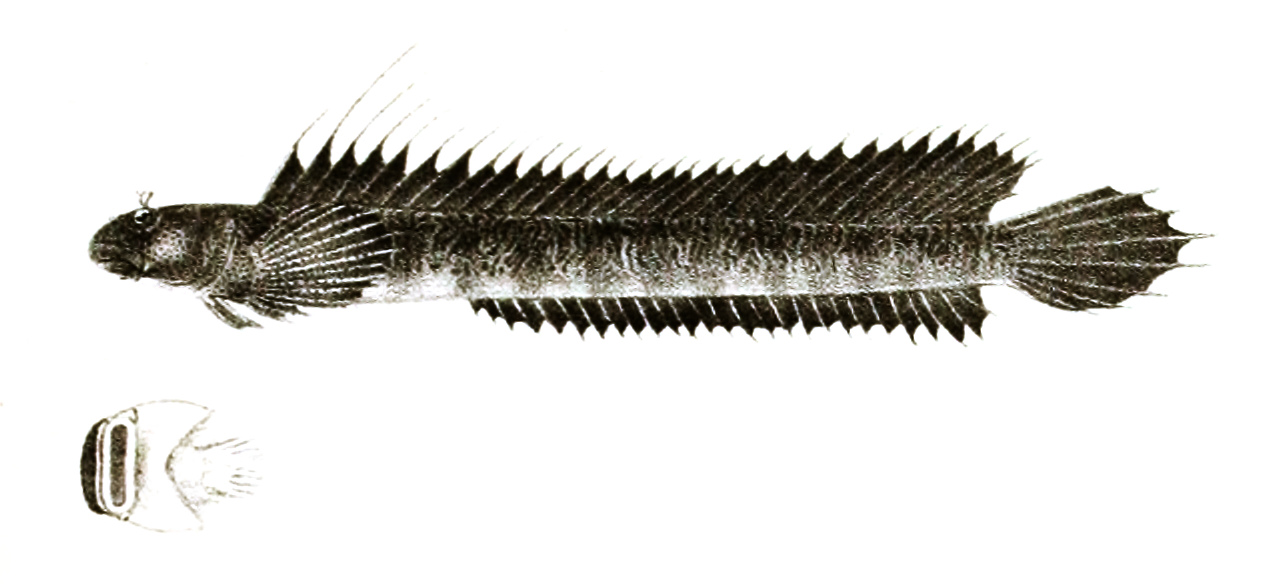
- Andamia expansa

Scientific classification
- Domain: Eukaryota
- Kingdom: Animalia
- Phylum: Chordata
- Class: Actinopterygii
- Order: Blenniiformes
- Suborder: Blennioidei
- Family: Blenniidae
- Subfamily: Salarinae
- Genus: Andamia; Blyth, 1858

Type species
- Andamia expansa Blyth 1858

= Andamia =

Genus of fishes

Andamia is a genus of combtooth blennies found in the Pacific and Indian Oceans.

== Species ==
There are currently seven recognized species in this genus:

- Andamia amphibius (Walbaum, 1792)
- Andamia cyclocheilus Weber, 1909
- Andamia expansa Blyth, 1858
- Andamia heteroptera (Bleeker, 1857)
- Andamia pacifica Tomiyama, 1955
- Andamia reyi (Sauvage, 1880) (Suckerlip blenny)
- Andamia tetradactylus (Bleeker, 1858)
