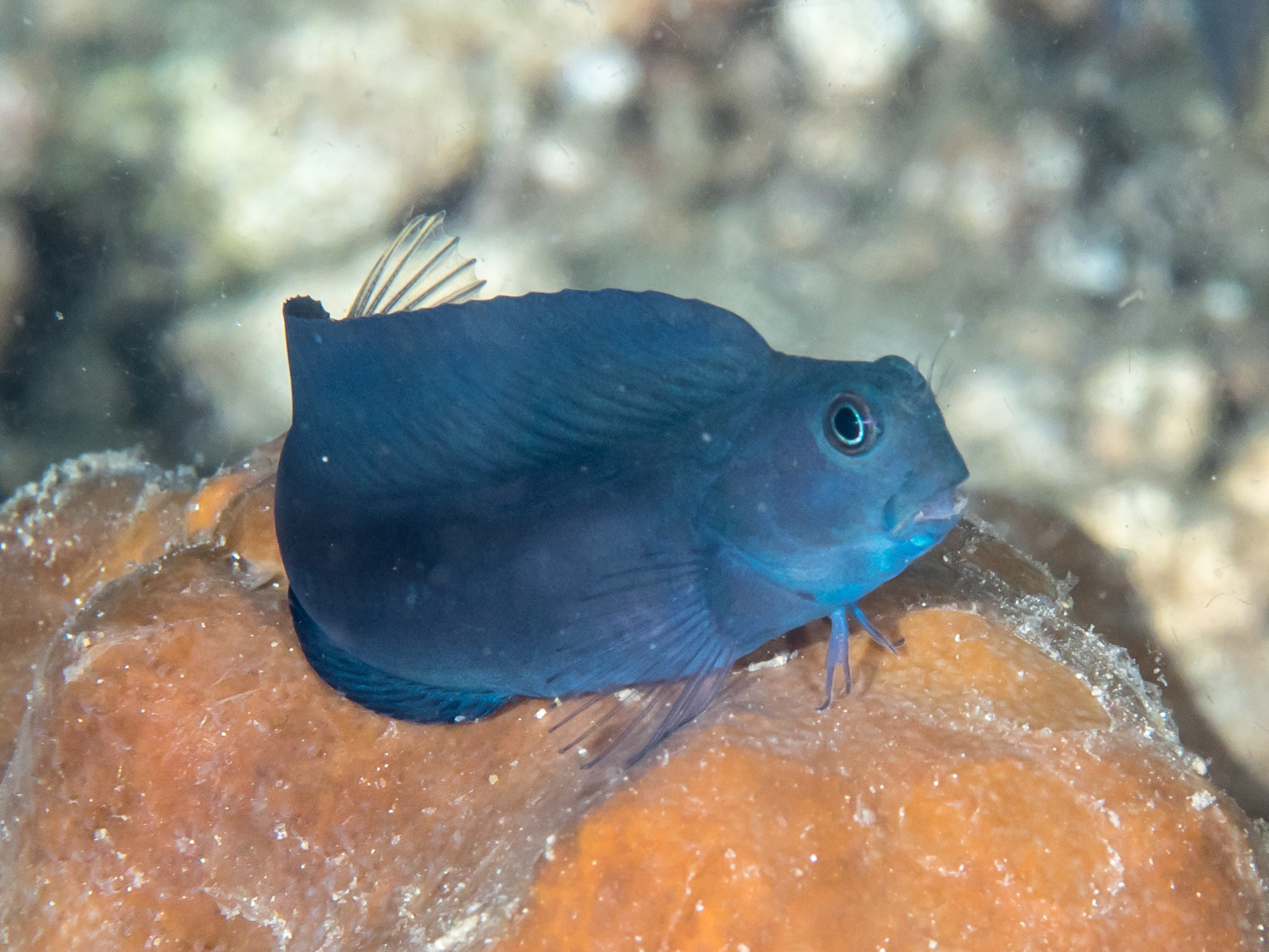
- Atrosalarias fuscus

Scientific classification
- Kingdom: Animalia
- Phylum: Chordata
- Class: Actinopterygii
- Order: Blenniiformes
- Family: Blenniidae
- Subfamily: Salariinae
- Genus: Atrosalarias; Whitley, 1933

Type species
- Salarias phaiosoma Bleeker, 1855

= Atrosalarias =

Genus of fishes

Atrosalarias is a genus of combtooth blennies found in the western Pacific Ocean and western Indian Ocean.

== Species ==
There are currently three recognized species in this genus:

- Atrosalarias fuscus (Rüppell, 1838)
- Atrosalarias holomelas (Günther, 1872) (Brown coral blenny)
- Atrosalarias hosokawai T. Suzuki & Senou, 1999
