= Pereulixia kosiensis =

Conservation status
- Least Concern (IUCN 3.1)

Scientific classification
- Kingdom: Animalia
- Phylum: Chordata
- Class: Actinopterygii
- Order: Blenniiformes
- Family: Blenniidae
- Subfamily: Salarinae
- Genus: Pereulixia; J. L. B. Smith, 1959
- Species: P. kosiensis

Binomial name
- Pereulixia kosiensis (Regan, 1908)

Synonyms
- Salarias kosiensis Regan, 1908; Cirripectes kosiensis (Regan, 1908)

Species of fish

Pereulixia kosiensis, the Kosi rockskipper, is a species of combtooth blenny found in the western Indian Ocean. This species reaches a length of 20 centimetres (7.9 in) SL. This species is currently the only known member of its genus.
