= Hirculops cornifer =

Conservation status
- Least Concern (IUCN 3.1)

Scientific classification
- Kingdom: Animalia
- Phylum: Chordata
- Class: Actinopterygii
- Order: Blenniiformes
- Family: Blenniidae
- Subfamily: Salariinae
- Genus: Hirculops; J. L. B. Smith, 1959
- Species: H. cornifer

Binomial name
- Hirculops cornifer (Rüppell, 1830)

Synonyms
- Blennius cornifer Rüppell, 1830; Hirculops cornifer menos Smith, 1959

Species of fish

Hirculops cornifer, the highbrow rockskipper, is a species of combtooth blenny found in the western Indian Ocean. This species reaches a length of 6 centimetres (2.4 in) SL. This species is the only known member of its genus.
