= Antennablennius =

Scientific classification
- Kingdom: Animalia
- Phylum: Chordata
- Class: Actinopterygii
- Order: Blenniiformes
- Family: Blenniidae
- Subfamily: Salariinae
- Genus: Antennablennius; Fowler, 1931

Type species
- Blennius hypenetes Klunzinger, 1871

Genus of fishes

Antennablennius is a genus of combtooth blennies found in the Indian Ocean, largely in the western regions.

== Species ==
There are currently nine recognized species in this genus:

- Antennablennius adenensis Fraser-Brunner, 1951 (Aden blenny)
- Antennablennius australis Fraser-Brunner, 1951 (Moustached rockskipper)
- Antennablennius bifilum (Günther, 1861) (Horned rockskipper)
- Antennablennius ceylonensis Bath, 1983
- Antennablennius hypenetes (Klunzinger, 1871) (Arabian blenny)
- Antennablennius sexfasciatus (von Bonde, 1923)
- Antennablennius simonyi (Steindachner, 1902) (Simony's blenny)
- Antennablennius variopunctatus (Jatzow & Lenz, 1898) (Orange-dotted blenny)
- Antennablennius velifer J. L. B. Smith, 1959
