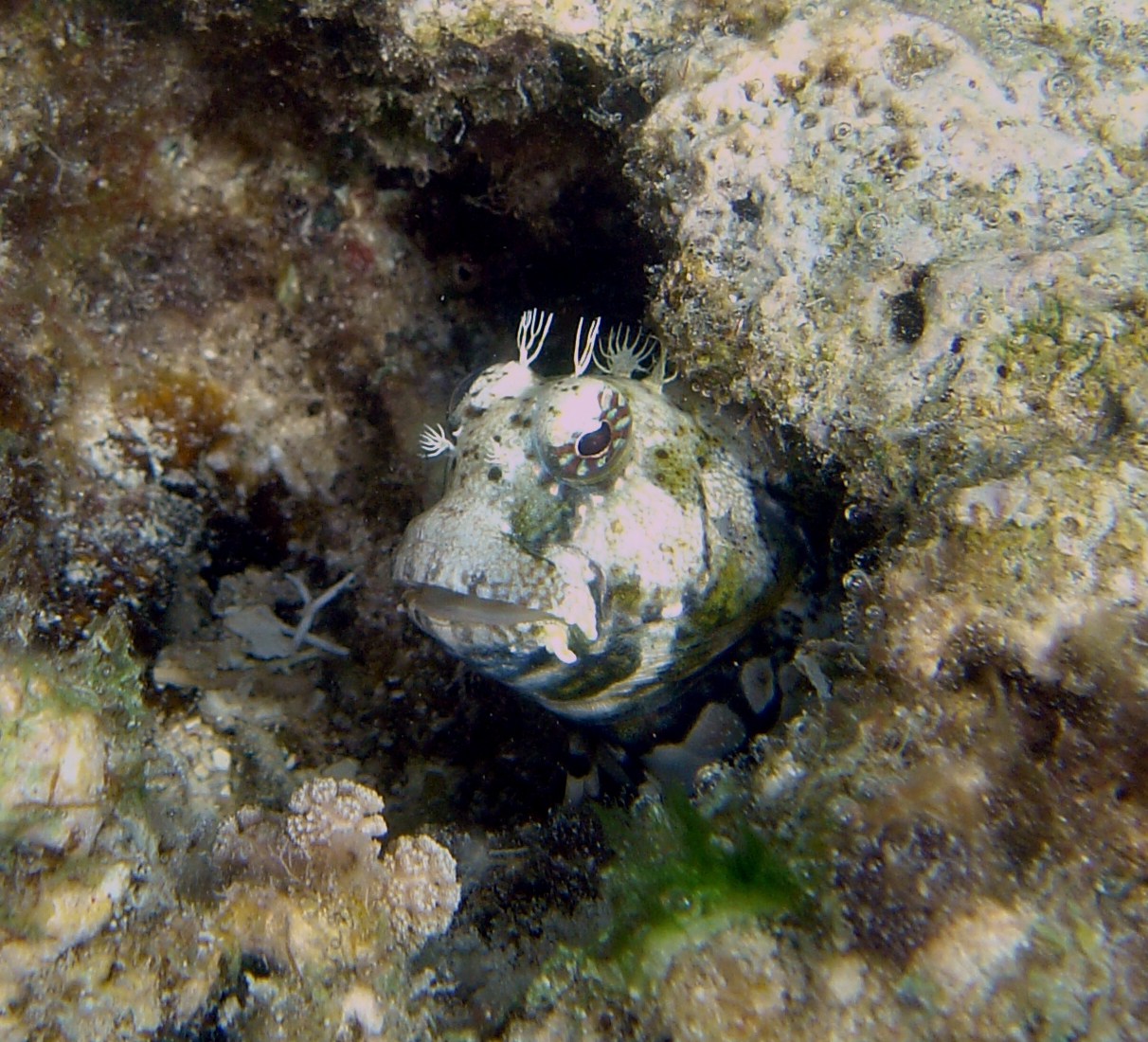

Conservation status
- Least Concern (IUCN 3.1)

Scientific classification
- Kingdom: Animalia
- Phylum: Chordata
- Class: Actinopterygii
- Order: Blenniiformes
- Family: Blenniidae
- Subfamily: Salarinae
- Genus: Nannosalarias; Smith-Vaniz & V. G. Springer, 1971
- Species: N. nativitatis

Binomial name
- Nannosalarias nativitatis (Regan, 1909)

Synonyms
- Blennius nativitatis Regan, 1909

= Nannosalarias nativitatis =

Species of fish

Nannosalarias nativitatis, the pygmy blenny or throatspot blenny, is a species of combtooth blenny found in coral reefs in the western Pacific and Indian oceans. This species grows to a length of 5 centimetres (2.0 in) TL. It is also commonly known as the Christmas blenny or the Christmas Island blenny. This species is the only known member of its genus.
