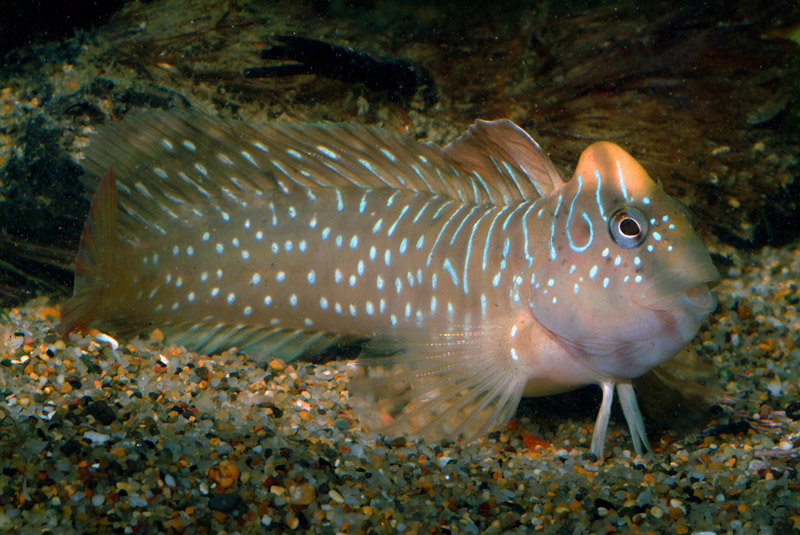
- Peacock Blenny (S. pavo)

Scientific classification
- Kingdom: Animalia
- Phylum: Chordata
- Class: Actinopterygii
- Order: Blenniiformes
- Family: Blenniidae
- Subfamily: Salariinae
- Genus: Salaria; Forsskål, 1775

Type species
- Blennius salaria Bloch, 1801

Species
- See below.

Synonyms
- Ichthyocoris Bonaparte (1840)

= Salaria =

Genus of fishes

Salaria is a genus of fish in the family Blenniidae. It now contains marine species which are found around the Mediterranean Sea and the eastern Atlantic Ocean. Freshwater species were reallocated to Salariopsis in 2022. One species, the peacock blenny, has colonised the northern Red Sea through the Suez Canal, a process knowns as anti-Lesspesian migration.

== Species ==
Following the marine/freshwater split, two species are recognized in this genus:

- Salaria basilisca (Valenciennes, 1836)
- Salaria pavo (A. Risso, 1810) (Peacock blenny)
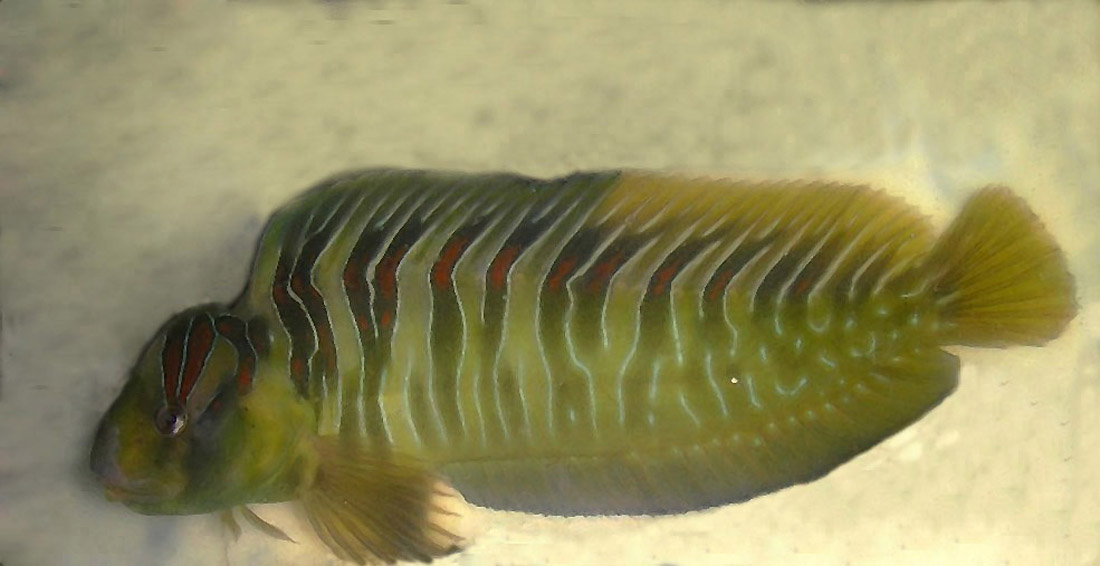
Salaria basilisca

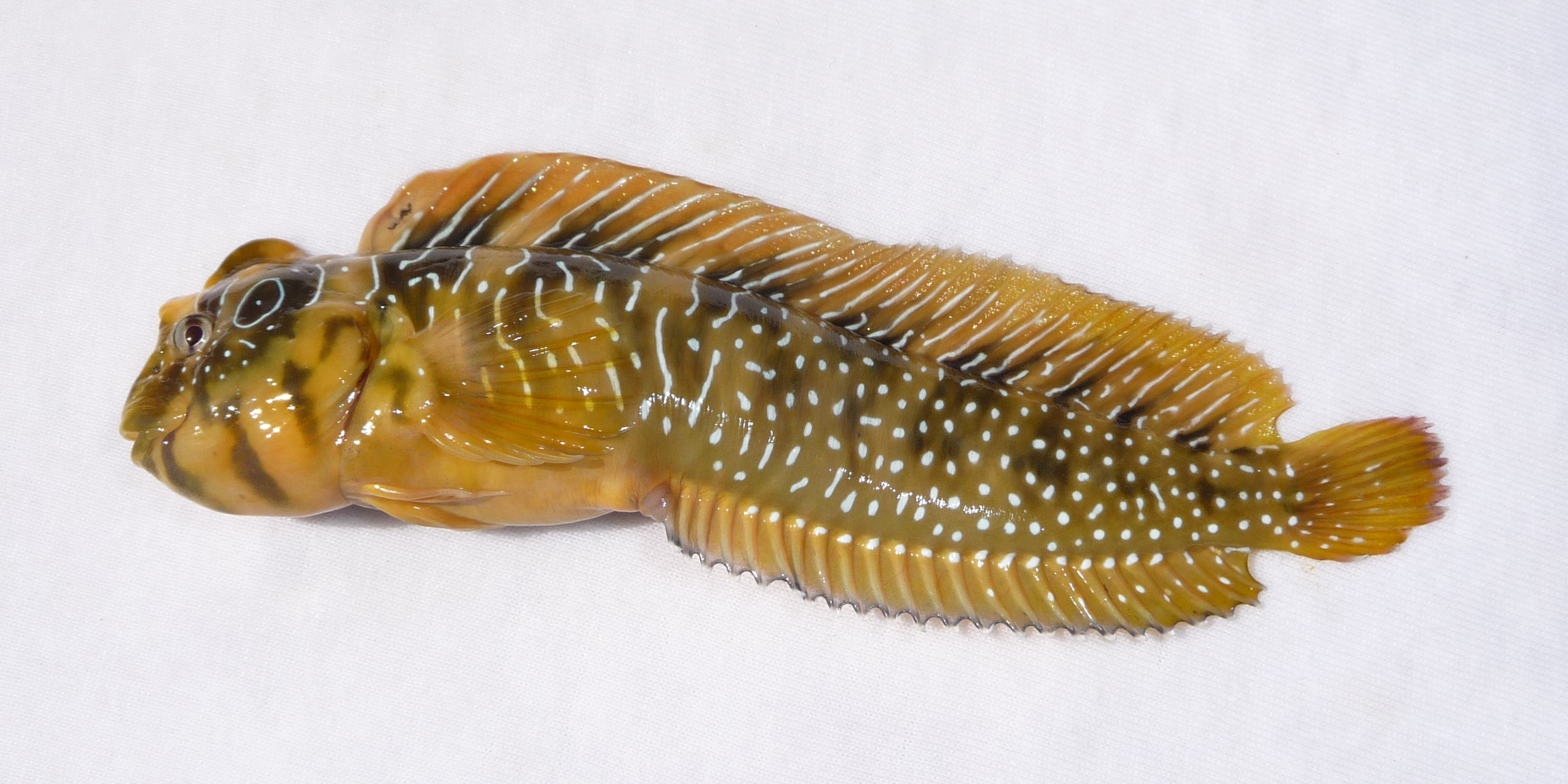
Salaria pavo
