= Bathyblennius antholops =

Conservation status
- Data Deficient (IUCN 3.1)

Scientific classification
- Kingdom: Animalia
- Phylum: Chordata
- Class: Actinopterygii
- Order: Blenniiformes
- Family: Blenniidae
- Subfamily: Salarinae
- Genus: Bathyblennius; Bath, 1977
- Species: B. antholops

Binomial name
- Bathyblennius antholops (V. G. Springer & Smith-Vaniz, 1970)

Synonyms
- Blennius antholops Springer & Smith-Vaniz, 1970

Species of fish

Bathyblennius antholops is a species of combtooth blenny found in the eastern Atlantic Ocean, around the Gulf of Guinea. This deep-water species occurs at depths of from 101 to 128 metres (331 to 420 ft). It is the only member of its genus. It can reach a maximum length of 5.4 centimetres (2.1 in) SL.
