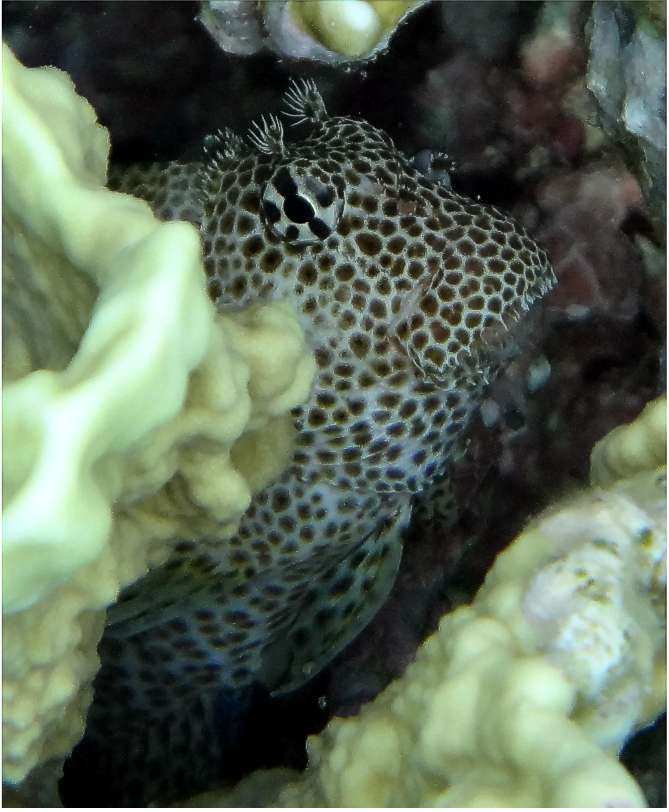

Conservation status
- Least Concern (IUCN 3.1)

Scientific classification
- Kingdom: Animalia
- Phylum: Chordata
- Class: Actinopterygii
- Division: Teleostei
- Order: Blenniiformes
- Family: Blenniidae
- Subfamily: Salariinae
- Genus: Exallias; D. S. Jordan & Evermann, 1905
- Species: E. brevis

Binomial name
- Exallias brevis (Kner, 1868)

= Exallias =

Genus of fishes

Exallias brevis, the leopard blenny, (or Pāoʻo ʻo kauila in Hawaiian) is a species of combtooth blenny found in coral reefs in the Pacific and Indian oceans. This species can be found in the aquarium trade and is the only known member of its genus.

== Description ==
Exallias brevis is easily identifiable by its blunt head and spotted body that varies in color and pattern. Males have brown spots on their head, with red spots on their body. While females and juveniles have brown spots all over. This species reaches a length of 14.5 centimetres (5.7 in) TL.

== Diet ==
Leopard blennies are known to consume superficial coenosarc tissue from coral polyps.

== Distribution and habitat ==
The leopard blenny is usually found in the Indo-Pacific, including Hawaiʻi, the Red Sea, Australia and French Polynesia, at a depth of 10–60 ft (3–18 m). Coral reefs are where this species makes its home.
