= Antennablennius variopunctatus =

Conservation status
- Least Concern (IUCN 3.1)

Scientific classification
- Kingdom: Animalia
- Phylum: Chordata
- Class: Actinopterygii
- Order: Blenniiformes
- Family: Blenniidae
- Genus: Antennablennius
- Species: A. variopunctatus

Binomial name
- Antennablennius variopunctatus (Jatzow & Lenz, 1898)

Synonyms
- Blennius variopunctatus Jatzow & Lenz, 1898

Species of fish

Antennablennius variopunctatus, the orange-dotted blenny, is a species of combtooth blenny found in the western Indian Ocean.

== Size ==
This species reaches a length of 7.5 cm (3.0 in).
