= Medusablennius =

Conservation status
- Vulnerable (IUCN 3.1)

Scientific classification
- Kingdom: Animalia
- Phylum: Chordata
- Class: Actinopterygii
- Order: Blenniiformes
- Family: Blenniidae
- Subfamily: Salarinae
- Genus: Medusablennius
- Species: M. chani

Binomial name
- Medusablennius chani Springer, 1966

Genus of fishes

Medusablennius is a monotypic genus of combtooth blenny, its only member being Medusablennius chani, which is known only from a single reef in the Tuamotu Archipelago. It was recorded from surge channels in tidal flats. This species is characterised by having numerous cirii on its head which is why Springer named the genus after the gorgon Medusa, while the specific name honours William L. Chan who noted that the type was likely to be a species new to science.
