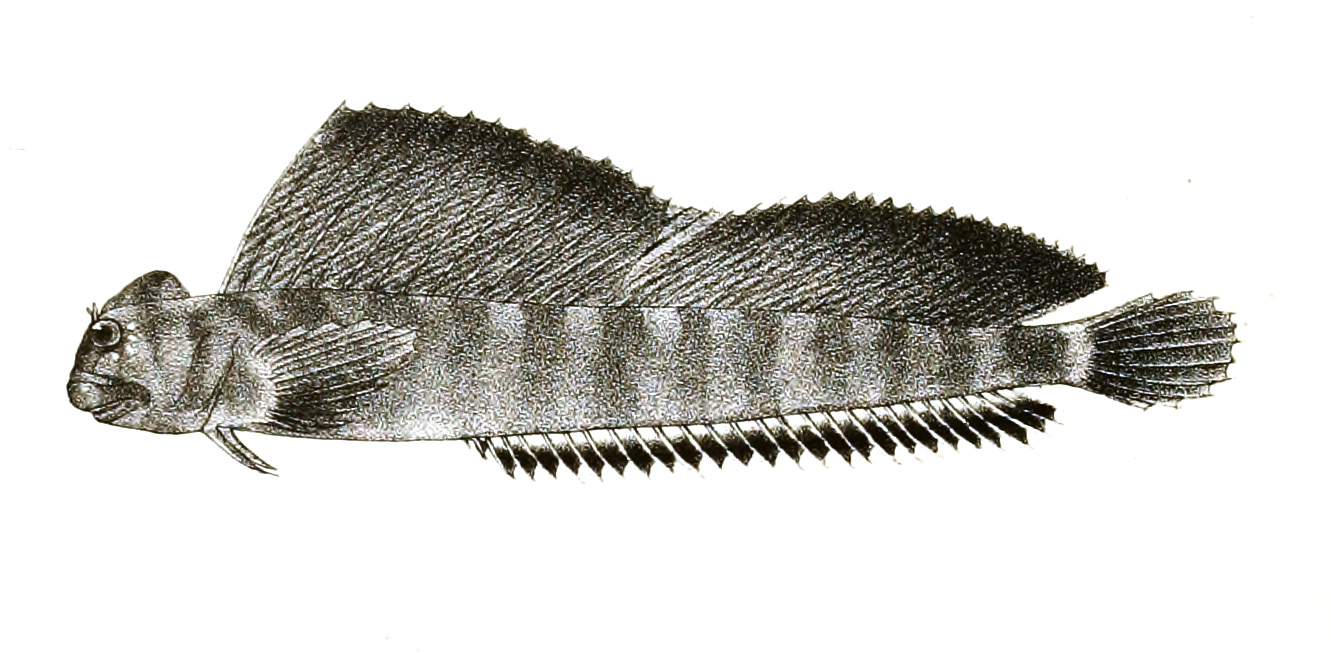

Conservation status
- Least Concern (IUCN 3.1)

Scientific classification
- Kingdom: Animalia
- Phylum: Chordata
- Class: Actinopterygii
- Order: Blenniiformes
- Family: Blenniidae
- Genus: Andamia
- Species: A. amphibius

Binomial name
- Andamia amphibius (Walbaum, 1792)

Synonyms
- Blennius amphibius Walbaum, 1792; Blennius tridactylus Bloch & Schneider, 1801

= Andamia amphibius =

Species of fish

Andamia amphibius is a species of combtooth blenny found in the western central Pacific Ocean, it is found in intertidal zone on exposed rocky shores of the Solomon Islands and Vanuatu to a depth of 2 metres (6.6 ft). It can breathe air and will move between rock pools at low tide. It is herbivorous. It lays adhesive eggs which are attached to the rocks with a filament while the larvae are planktonic and are frequently encountered in shallow water.
