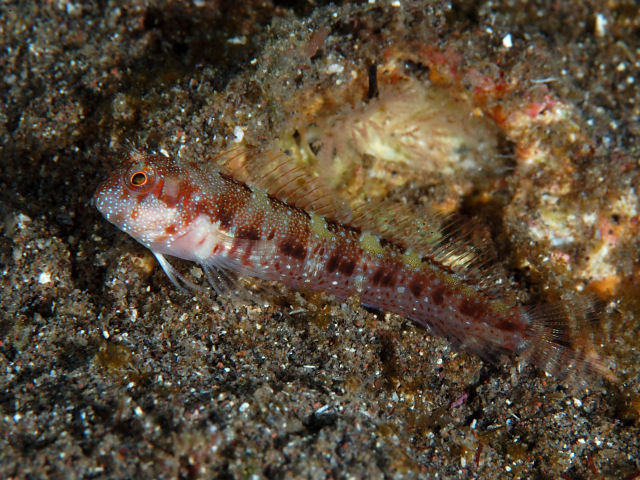
- Mimoblennius atrocinctus

Scientific classification
- Kingdom: Animalia
- Phylum: Chordata
- Class: Actinopterygii
- Order: Blenniiformes
- Family: Blenniidae
- Subfamily: Salariinae
- Genus: Mimoblennius; Smith-Vaniz & V. G. Springer, 1971

Type species
- Blennius atrocinctus Regan, 1909

Species
- See text.

= Mimoblennius =

Genus of fishes

Mimoblennius is a genus of combtooth blennies found in the Indian Ocean and the western Pacific Ocean.

== Species ==
- Mimoblennius atrocinctus (Regan, 1909) (Banded blenny)
- Mimoblennius cas V. G. Springer & Spreitzer, 1978
- Mimoblennius cirrosus Smith-Vaniz & V. G. Springer, 1971 (Fringed blenny)
- Mimoblennius lineathorax R. Fricke, 1999
- Mimoblennius rusi V. G. Springer & Spreitzer, 1978 (Rusi blenny)
