= Litobranchus =

Conservation status
- Least Concern (IUCN 3.1)

Scientific classification
- Kingdom: Animalia
- Phylum: Chordata
- Class: Actinopterygii
- Order: Blenniiformes
- Family: Blenniidae
- Genus: Litobranchus; Smith-Vaniz & V. G. Springer, 1971
- Species: L. fowleri

Binomial name
- Litobranchus fowleri (Herre, 1936)

Synonyms
- Salarias fowleri

Genus of fishes

Litobranchus fowleri, Fowler's rockskipper, is a species of combtooth blenny found in coral reefs in the western Pacific ocean. It can reach a maximum length of 3.5 centimetres (1.4 in) SL. This species is currently the only species in its genus. The specific name hours the American ichthyologist Henry Weed Fowler (1878-1965).
