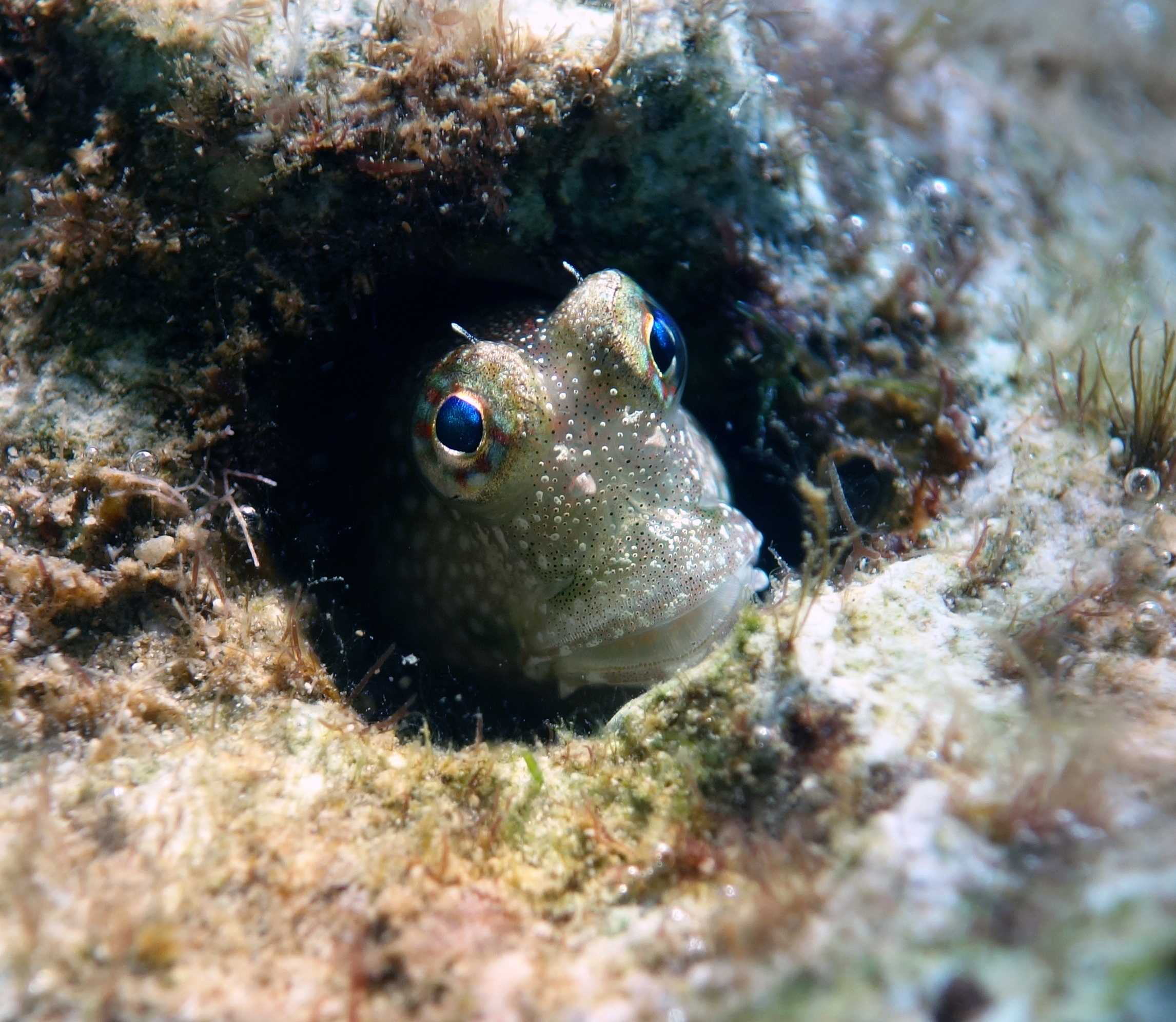

Conservation status
- Least Concern (IUCN 3.1)

Scientific classification
- Kingdom: Animalia
- Phylum: Chordata
- Class: Actinopterygii
- Order: Blenniiformes
- Family: Blenniidae
- Genus: Crossosalarias
- Species: C. macrospilus

Binomial name
- Crossosalarias macrospilus Smith-Vaniz & V. G. Springer, 1971

= Triplespot blenny =

Species of fish

The Triplespot blenny (Crossosalarias macrospilus) is a species combtooth blenny from the Western Pacific. It occasionally makes its way into the aquarium trade. It grows to a length of 10 centimetres (3.9 in) TL. This species is the only known member of its genus.
