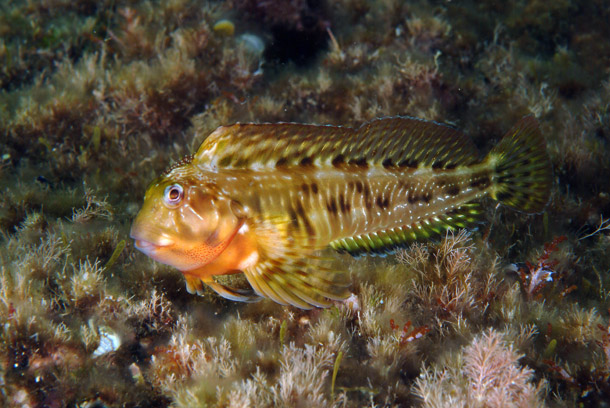
- Scartella cristata

Scientific classification
- Kingdom: Animalia
- Phylum: Chordata
- Class: Actinopterygii
- Division: Teleostei
- Order: Blenniiformes
- Suborder: Blennioidei
- Family: Blenniidae; Rafinesque, 1810

Subfamilies
- Salarinae; Blenniinae

= Combtooth blenny =

Combtooth blennies Temporal range: Middle Miocene–present

Family of fishes

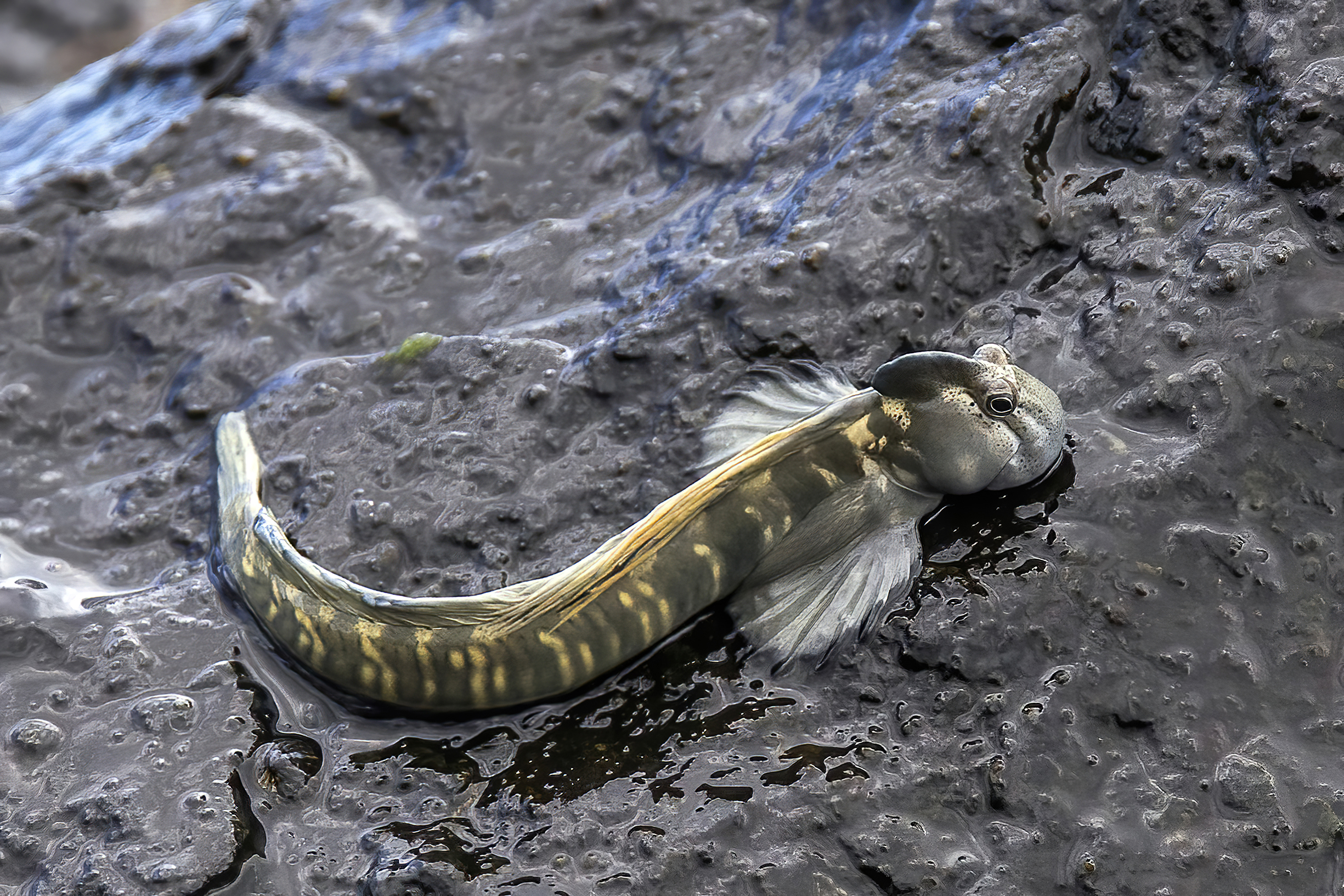
Leaping blennies of the genus Alticus move on land by jumping using their tails

Combtooth blennies are blenniiformids; percomorph marine fish of the family Blenniidae, part of the order Blenniiformes. They are the largest family of blennies with around 401 known species in 58 genera. Combtooth blennies are found in tropical and subtropical waters in the Atlantic, Pacific and Indian Oceans; some species are also found in brackish and even freshwater environments.

== Description ==
The body plan of the combtooth blennies is archetypal to all other blennioids; their blunt heads and eyes are large, with large continuous dorsal fins (which may have three to 17 spines). Their bodies are compressed, elongated, and scaleless; their small, slender pelvic fins (which are absent in only two species) have one spine and three to four soft rays, and are situated in front of their enlarged pectoral fins, and their tail fins are rounded. As their name would suggest, combtooth blennies are noted for the comb-like teeth lining their jaws. Combtooth blennies are active and often highly colourful, making them popular in the aquarium hobby.

Larvae are similar to the adults, though have a prominent preopercular spine that disappears during metamorphosis.

By far the largest species is the eel-like hairtail blenny at 53 cm (21 in) in length; most other members of the family are much smaller.

== Habitat and behaviour ==
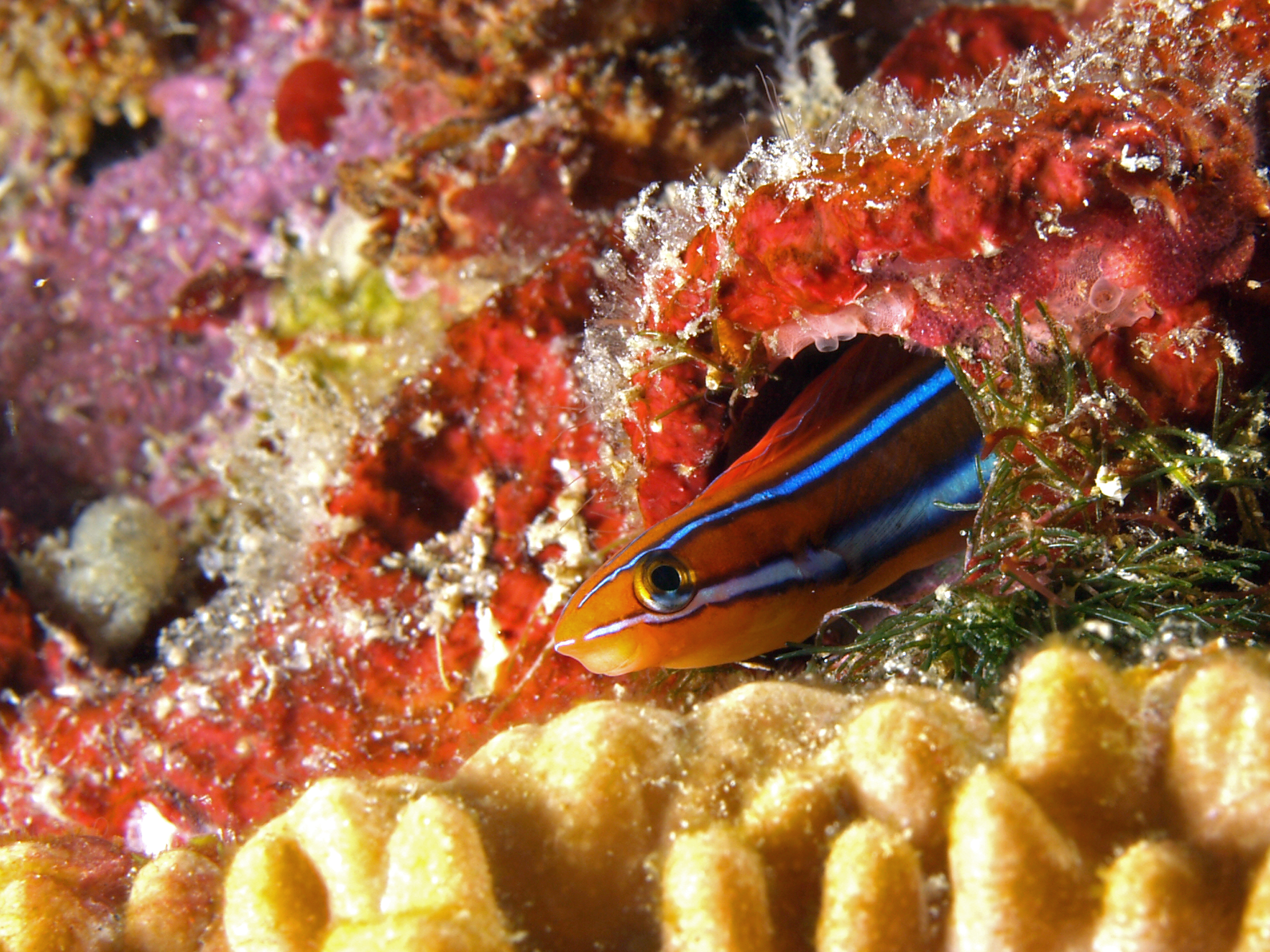
Blue-lined sabertooth blenny Plagiotremus rhinorhynchos in a rock hole

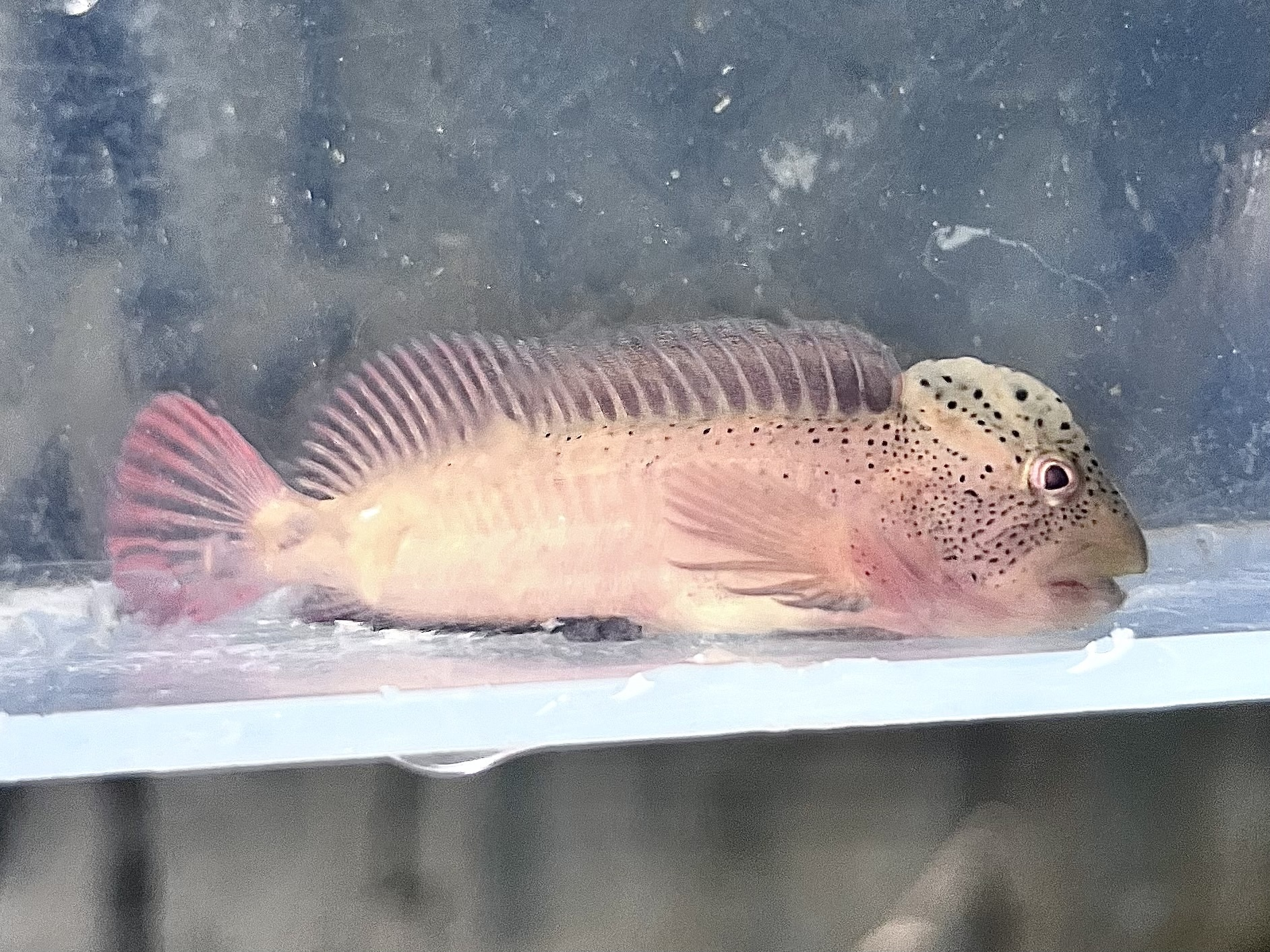
Salariopsis fluviatilis is the only exclusively freshwater species of blenniid

Generally benthic fish, combtooth blennies spend much of their time on or near the bottom. They may inhabit the rocky crevices of reefs, burrows in sandy or muddy substrates, or even empty shells. Generally found in shallow waters, some combtooth blennies are capable of leaving the water for short periods during low tide, aided by their large pectoral fins which act as "feet". Small benthic crustaceans, mollusks, and other sessile invertebrates are the primary food items for most species; others eat algae or plankton.

The genera Aspidontus, Meiacanthus, Petroscirtes, Plagiotremus, and Xiphasia form a monophyletic clade commonly referred to as the fangblennies. They have swim bladders unlike the other clades, and fang-like teeth with venom glands at their bases. Aspidontus and Plagiotremus mimic cleaner wrasses: by imitating the latter's colour, form, and behaviour, the blennies are able to trick other fish (or even divers) into letting down their guard, long enough for the blennies to nip a quick mouthful of skin or scale.

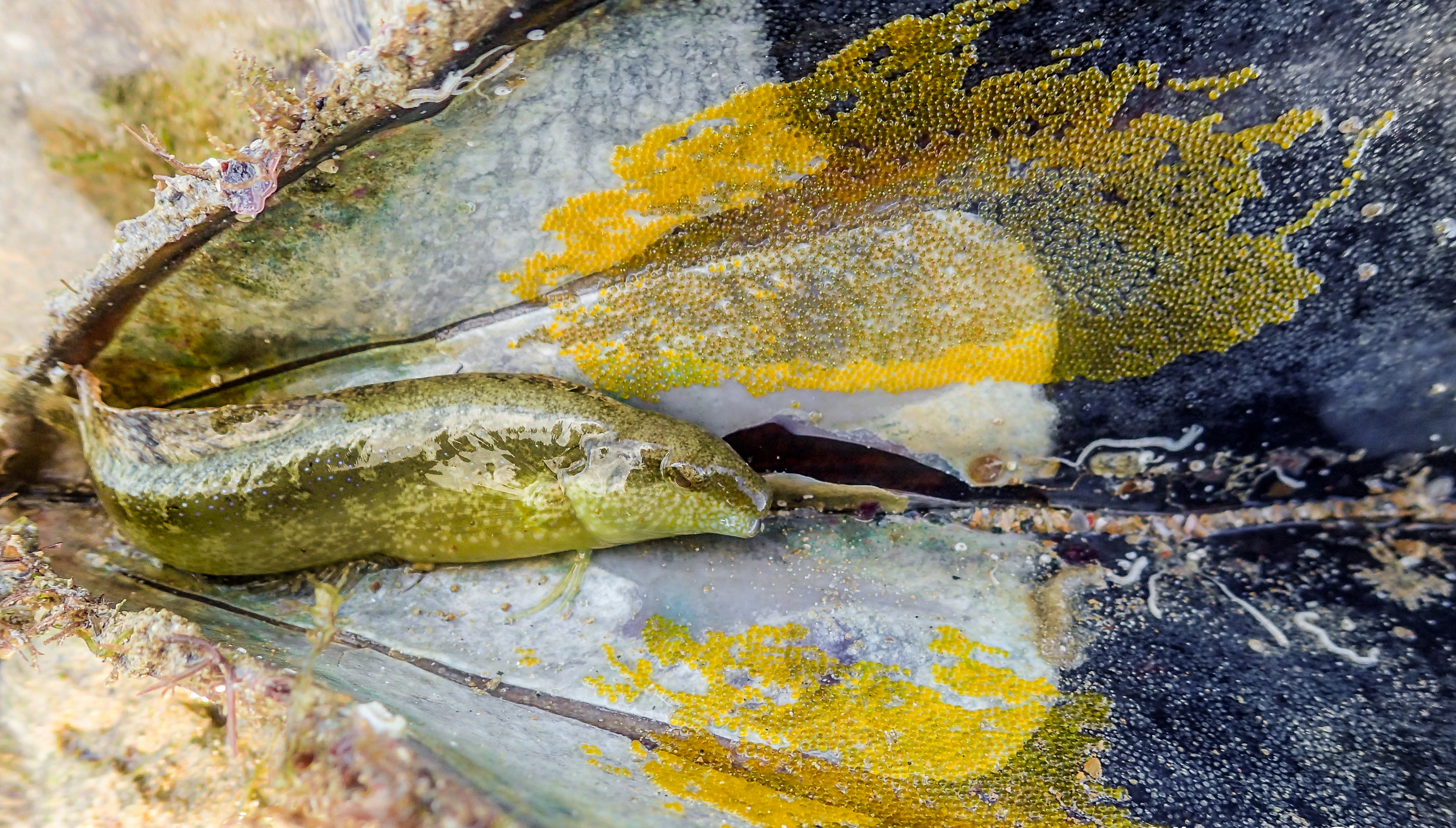
A very protective Petroscirtes variabilis male risks his life to protect his brood

Some combtooth blennies form small groups, while others are solitary and territorial. They may be either diurnal or nocturnal, depending on the species. Females lay eggs in shells or under rock ledges; males guard the nest of eggs until hatching.

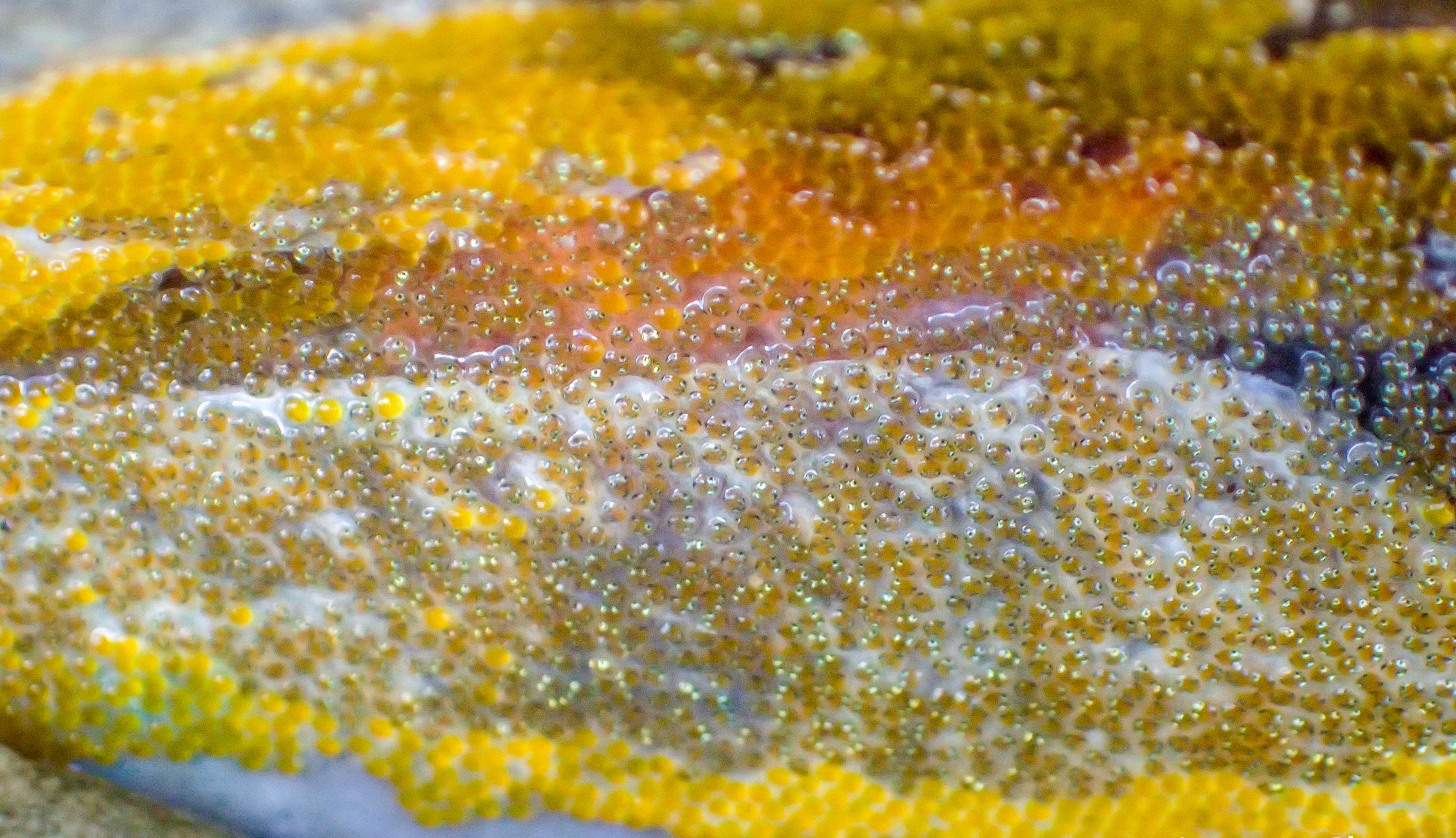
Close-up of eggs mass in the various developmental stages. The clear orange eggs are likely recently laid, while those with eyes were laid earlier

In some species, the eggs may remain in the oviduct of the female until hatched. The fry of some species undergo an 'ophioblennius' stage, wherein the fish are pelagic (i.e., inhabiting the midwater) and have greatly enlarged pectoral fins and hooked teeth.

== Classification ==
This family is currently divided into two subfamilies and approximately 58 genera and 397 species.

The following genera are classified within the family Blenniidae:

- Subfamily Salarinae Gill, 1859
  - Aidablennius Whitley, 1947
  - Alloblennius Smith-Vaniz & Springer, 1971
  - Alticus Lacépède, 1800
  - Andamia Blyth, 1858
  - Antennablennius Fowler, 1931
  - Atrosalarias Whitley 1933
  - Bathyblennius Bath, 1977
  - Blenniella Reid, 1943
  - Chalaroderma Norman, 1944
  - Chasmodes Valenciennes, 1836
  - Cirripectes Swainson, 1839
  - Cirrisalarias Springer, 1976
  - Coryphoblennius Norman, 1944
  - Crossosalarias Smith-Vaniz & Springer, 1971
  - Dodekablennos Springer & Spreitzer, 1978
  - Ecsenius McCulloch, 1923
  - Entomacrodus Gill, 1859
  - Exallias Jordan & Evermann, 1905
  - Glyptoparus J. L. B. Smith, 1959
  - Hirculops J. L. B. Smith, 1959
  - Hypleurochilus Gill, 1861
  - Hypsoblennius Gill, 1861
  - Istiblennius Whitley, 1943
  - Lipophrys Gill, 1896
  - Litobranchus Smith-Vaniz & Springer, 1971
  - Lupinoblennius Herre, 1942
  - Medusablennius Springer, 1966
  - Microlipophrys Almada, Almada, Guillemaud & Wirtz, 2005
  - Mimoblennius Smith-Vaniz & Springer, 1971
  - Nannosalarias Smith-Vaniz & Springer, 1971
  - Ophioblennius Gill, 1860
  - Parablennius Miranda-Ribeiro, 1915
  - Parahypsos Bath, 1982
  - Paralticus Springer & Williams, 1994
  - Pereulixia J. L. B. Smith, 1959
  - Praealticus Schultz & Chapman, 1960
  - Rhabdoblennius Whitley, 1930
  - Salaria Forsskål, 1775
  - Salarias Cuvier, 1816
  - Scartella Jordan, 1886
  - Scartichthys Jordan & Evermann, 1898
  - Stanulus J. L. B. Smith, 1959
- Subfamily Blenniinae Rafinesque, 1810
  - Adelotremus Smith-Vaniz & Rose, 2012
  - Aspidontus Cuvier, 1834
  - Blennius Linnaeus, 1758
  - Enchelyurus Peters, 1868
  - Haptogenys Springer, 1972
  - Laiphognathus J. L. B. Smith, 1955
  - Meiacanthus Norman, 1944
  - Oman Springer, 1985
  - Omobranchus Valenciennes, 1836
  - Omox Springer, 1972
  - Parenchelyurus Springer, 1972
  - Petroscirtes Rüppell, 1830
  - Phenablennius Springer & Smith-Vaniz, 1972
  - Plagiotremus Gill, 1865
  - Spaniblennius Bath & Wirtz, 1989
  - Xiphasia Swainson. 1839

=== Fossil genera ===
The following fossil genera are also known:

- †Bestiolablennius Prokofiev, 2001 (Early Miocene of Azerbaijan)
- †Mioblennius Bannikov, 1998 (Middle Miocene of Azerbaijan)
- †Tottoriblennius Yabumoto & Uyeno, 2007 (Middle Miocene of Japan)

The otolith-based fossil species Exallias vectensis, from the Early Eocene of England, may potentially represent the oldest record of the group.

== See also ==
- List of fish common names
- List of fish families
