= Frank Talbot =

Australian marine biologist (1930–2024)

Frank Hamilton Talbot, AM (3 January 1930 – 15 October 2024) was a South-African-born Australian ichthyologist and marine biologist. He was former director of the Australian Museum and the only Australian to have become director of the Smithsonian Natural History Museum. His research and his work at the institutions he led have had a lasting impact on science, academia, and public education, and the Lizard Island Research Station, founded by him in 1973, continues his work. He has had two species of fish named after him, and the Australian Museum holds the annual Talbot Oration in his honour.

== Early life and education ==
Frank Hamilton Talbot was born in Pietermaritzburg, South Africa on 3 January 1930.

He obtained a Bachelor of Science degree at Witwatersrand University in Johannesburg in 1949, followed by an MSc at the University of Cape Town (UCT) in 1951. In 1959 he earned a PhD at UCT.

== Career ==
In 1952 he was appointed a demonstrator at Kings College at the University of Durham in the UK, before moving to Zanzibar in 1954 to take up a position with the British Colonial Service as a fisheries scientist.

From 1959 (when he earned his PhD) until 1962 he worked as a marine Biologist at the South African Museum in Cape Town, before being promoted to the position of assistant director of the museum.

In 1964 he moved with his family to Australia, taking up the position of Curator of Fishes at the Australian Museum in Sydney. In 1965, he was appointed director of the museum, a position he held for 10 years from 1966, following the retirement of Gilbert Whitley. Under his leadership, the museum became a world leader in biodiversity, natural history, and conservation education. Under his guidance first the One Tree Island Research Station at the southern end of the Great Barrier Reef, and then the Lizard Island Research Station at the northern end, were established (around 1965 and in 1973 respectively).

In 1968 he created a new Department of Environmental Studies at the museum. In the same year, he helped to establish the National Photographic Index of Birds project. In 1972, he founded The Australian Museum Society (TAMS), which continues as the Australian Museum Members program, for members of the general public to learn more and be involved in the museum's activities. He recruited top scientists, and, thanks to greater government funding, the staff doubled in number to 150.

After resigning from the museum in June 1975, Talbot became the foundation professor of environmental studies at Macquarie University in Sydney.

In 1982 he moved countries again, taking up the position of director of the California Academy of Sciences in San Francisco, United States, where he stayed until 1989, when he was appointed director of the National Museum of Natural History at the Smithsonian Institution in Washington, D.C. (the first and as of 2024 only Australian to do so). Upon completing his term in 1994, he was appointed emeritus director of the museum.

In 1995, Talbot was appointed adjunct professor at the Graduate School of the Environment, Macquarie University.

He played a key role in the establishment of the Sydney Institute of Marine Science (SIMS), a partnership among four Sydney universities, in 2005, and in February 2006 was appointed founding chair. He worked full-time in this position until his retirement on 31 December 2009, just before his 80th birthday, but continued as a board member.

== Research ==
Talbot's research was world-renowned. He was a pioneer in the research in coral reef ecosystems, adding greatly to global understanding, including the urgent need for its protection and conservation. His groundbreaking research on coral reefs in the Red Sea and across the Indo-Pacific brought worldwide attention to these environments, in a time before there was widespread awareness of climate change and marine conservation.

In 1970 he was involved in a significant environmental survey of Lord Howe Island, which included scientists from the Australian Museum, the Royal Botanic Gardens, the National Parks and Wildlife Service, and the CSIRO.

In 1971 he joined NASA's Tektite II program, in which a group of "Aquanauts" lived in an underwater capsule on the seabed of the Virgin Islands for over two weeks. The scientists researched fish activity and monitored the effects of living in the confined space.

== Personal life and death ==
Talbot was married for 70 years to Sue Talbot (died 2020), a marine scientist. They were survived by their daughter and three sons.

Frank Talbot died on 15 October 2024, at the age of 94. Many scientists paid tribute to his friendship and achievements, including science journalist and president emeritus of the Australian Museum Trustees Robyn Williams; scientist Tim Flannery; Des Griffin, who succeeded Talbot as director of the museum; and Australian Museum chief scientist and director of AMRI, Kris Helgen.

The Australian Museum wrote on their website: "Professor Talbot was a visionary whose contributions to both academia and public education have left an enduring legacy." The current director of the museum wrote: "Frank was a legend in the international museum and science world and has provided inspiration and a model for how museums can play a vital role dealing with issues like climate change and ocean warming". President of the museum trust, Brian Hartzer, wrote that his legacy would "live on through the countless lives he touched, the ecosystems he worked to preserve, and the institutions he helped transform".

== Legacy ==
The Australian Museum holds the Talbot Oration each year, so named to honour his legacy. The inaugural oration was given in June 2021 by Tim Flannery, whose address was titled "The Climate Cure".

At least four species of fish were named in honour of Talbot:

- Stanulus talboti (Talbot's blenny), named in 1968
- Chrysiptera talboti (Talbot's Damsel)
- Dermatopsoides talboti Cohen 1966
- Apogon talboti Smith 1961

== Recognition and awards ==
- 1972: Elected Fellow of the Royal Zoological Society of New South Wales
- 1985: Fellow, California Academy of Sciences
- 1988: Fellow, International Association of Biological Oceanographers
- 2005: Honorary Life Member, Australian Marine Sciences Association (AMSA)
- 2012: Member of the Order of Australia (AM), for service to environmental protection through the Sydney Institute of Marine Science, to coral reef research, to museum development and management, and to international scientific organisations
- 2016: Lifetime Achievement Award, Australian Museum Research Institute

== Other activities ==
Talbot also held various positions on boards and committees, including:

- 1968-1969: Chair, New South Wales Scientific Committee on Parks and Wildlife
- 1968-1974: Member, NSW National Parks & Wildlife Service Advisory Committee
- 1969-1980: Member, Taronga Zoo board
- 1971-1972: President, AMSA
- 1972-1979: Member, Sydney Metropolitan Water Sewerage and Drainage Board
- 1973-1974: President, Museums Association of Australia
- 1975-2005: Member, AMSA
- 1976-1978: Member of Council, Great Barrier Reef Committee
- 1976-1980: Chair, Coral Reef Committee, International Association of Biological Oceanographers
- 1980-1982: Chair, Taronga Zoo board
- 1996-2004: Trustee, World Wildlife Fund (Australia)
- 2006-2009: Founding chair, Sydney Institute of Marine Science (SIMS)

== Publications ==
Talbot co-authored and co-edited several books, including:

- Characteristics of marine fish communities of the Great Barrier Reef region, and its implications for management (1979)
- Fishes of Tasmania (1983)
- Coral reefs, mangroves and seagrasses : a sourcebook for managers (2000)

== Taxon described by him ==
- See Category:Taxa named by Frank Hamilton Talbot
