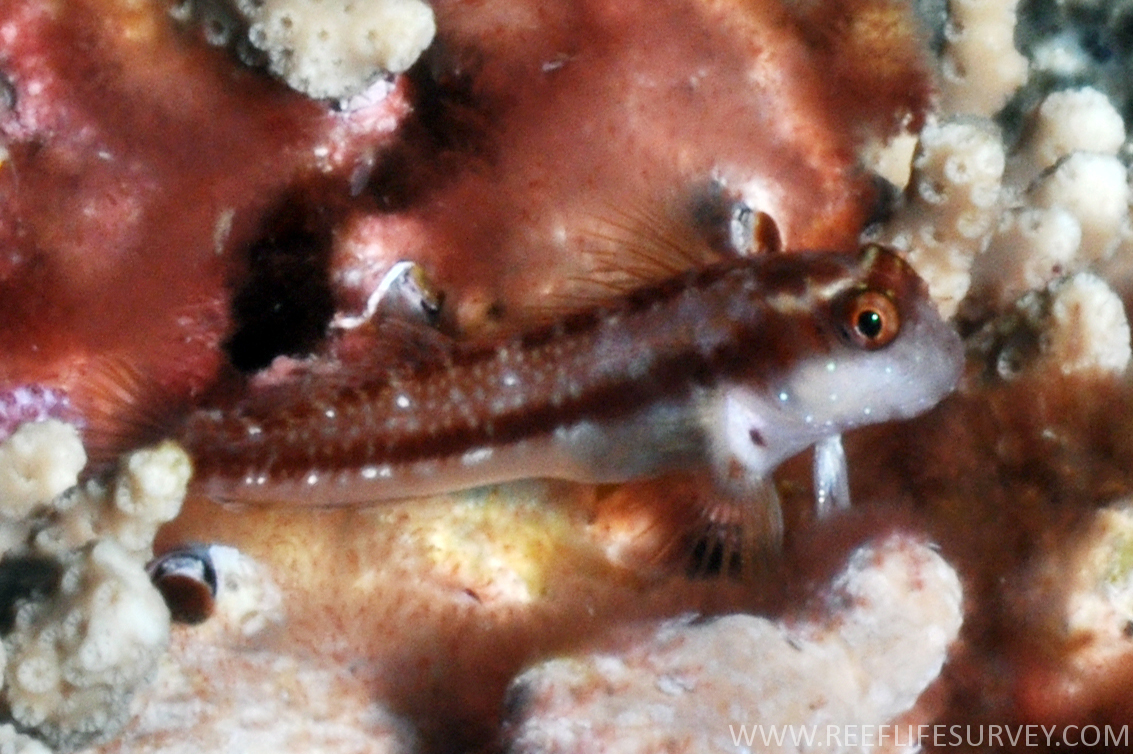
- Stanulus talboti

Scientific classification
- Kingdom: Animalia
- Phylum: Chordata
- Class: Actinopterygii
- Order: Blenniiformes
- Family: Blenniidae
- Subfamily: Salariinae
- Genus: Stanulus; J. L. B. Smith, 1959

Type species
- Stanulus seychellensis J. L. B. Smith, 1959

= Stanulus =

Genus of fishes

Stanulus is a genus of combtooth blennies found in the Pacific and Indian Oceans.

== Species ==
The currently recognized species in this genus are:

- Stanulus seychellensis J. L. B. Smith, 1959 (Seychelle's blenny)
- Stanulus talboti V. G. Springer, 1968 (Talbot's blenny)
