= California Academy of Sciences =

Natural history museum in San Francisco, United States

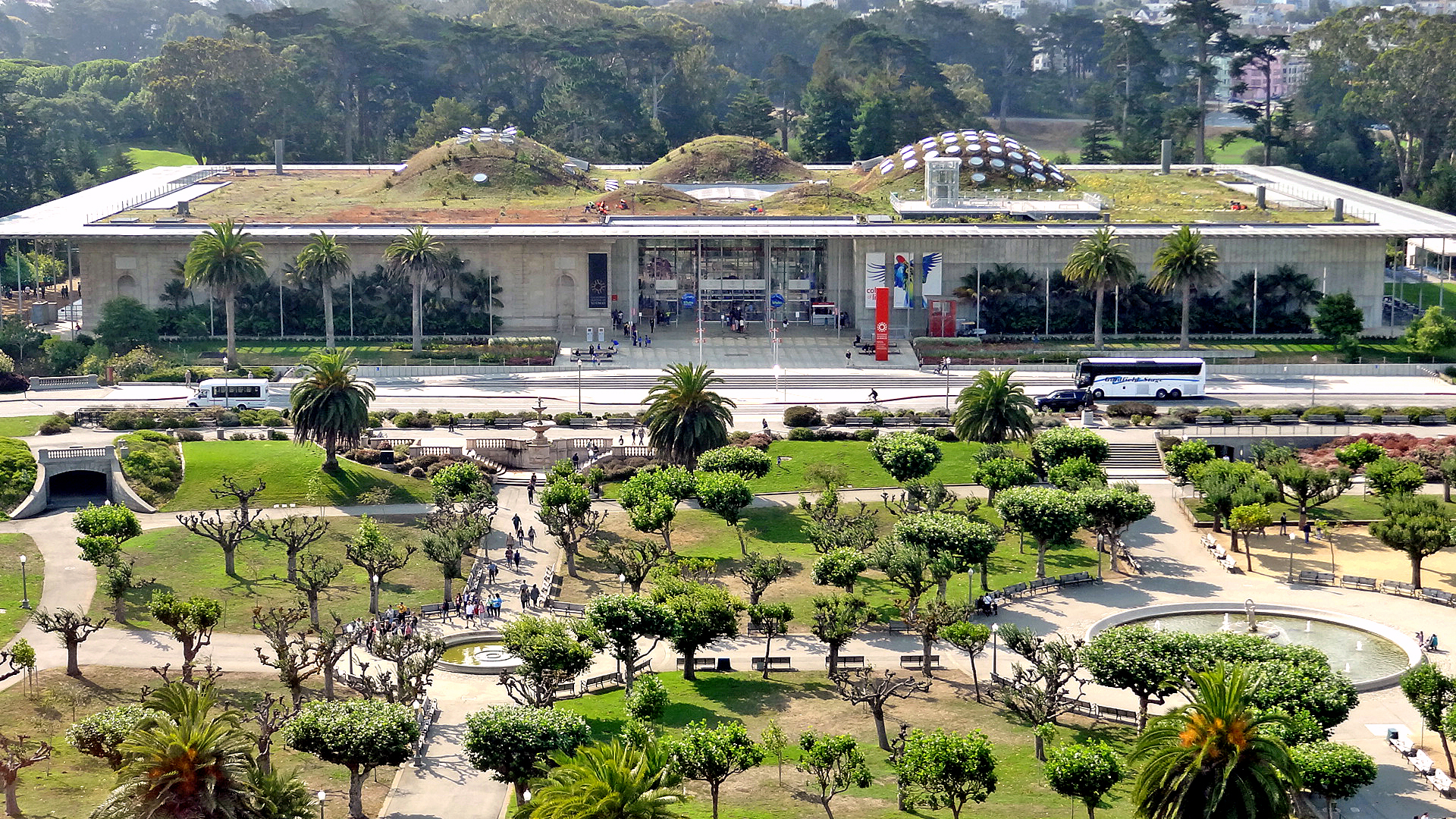
- Established: 1853
- Location: Golden Gate Park; San Francisco, California, United States
- Coordinates: 37.7701°N 122.4664°W
- Type: Natural history
- Accreditation: AAM; ASTC
- Visitors: 1.34 million (2016)
- Architect: Renzo Piano
- Employees: 504 (May 2020)
- Public transit access: 9th and Irving; Bus: 44, 5, 7
- Website: calacademy.org

The California Academy of Sciences is a research institute and natural history museum in San Francisco, California, that is among the largest museums of natural history in the world, housing over 46 million specimens. The academy began in 1853 as a learned society and still carries out a large amount of original research. The institution is located in Golden Gate Park on the West Side of San Francisco.

Completely rebuilt in 2008, the academy's primary building in Golden Gate Park covers 400,000 square feet (37,000 m^{2}). In early 2020, before the COVID-19 pandemic, the California Academy of Sciences had around 500 employees and an annual revenue of about $33 million.

== Governance ==
The California Academy of Sciences, California's oldest operating museum and research institution for the natural sciences, is governed by a 41-member board of trustees who are nominated and chosen by the California Academy of Sciences Fellows. The Academy Fellows are in turn, "[n]ominated by their colleagues and appointed by the Board of Trustees...the Fellows remain members of the Fellowship for life." The board of trustees is then responsible for appointing the executive management of the academy, who in turn are responsible for overseeing the academy's overall operation and the hiring of its other managers and employees.

=== Institute for Biodiversity Science and Sustainability (IBSS) ===
Besides its function as a source of public science education through its museum, the California Academy of Sciences also operates the Institute for Biodiversity Science and Sustainability (IBSS) as its research arm, conducting research in the fields of taxonomy, phylogenetics, and biodiversity studies. Although some aspects of IBSS collections and research are available for viewing by museum patrons at the "Hidden Wonders" exhibit, most of the research happens in laboratories and facilities, "behind the scenes", and not observable by the public. In fact, unbeknownst to most patrons, research and administrative facilities occupy nearly 50% of the Academy's physical structure.

== Exhibits ==
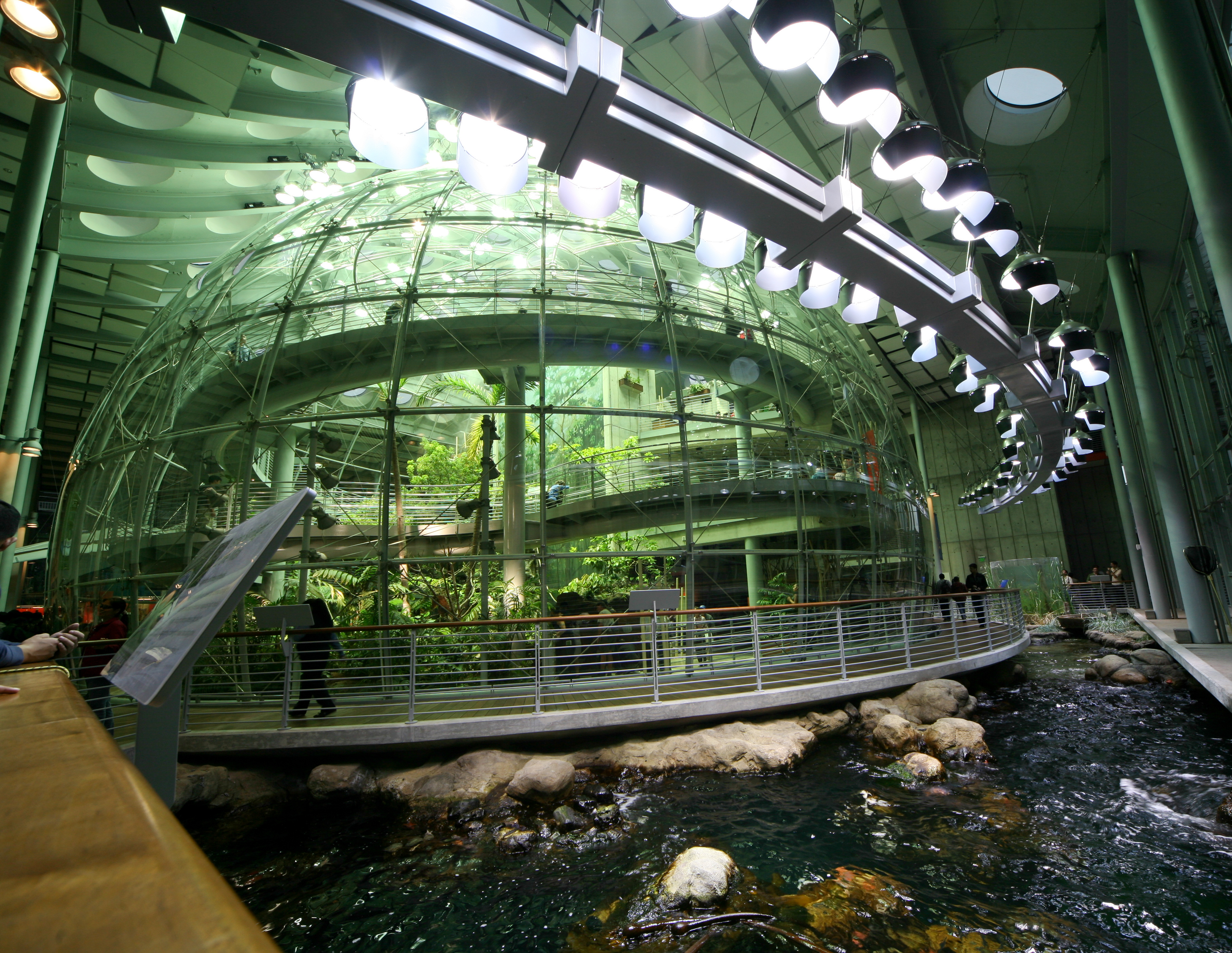
The 90-foot (27 m) diameter spherical glass dome enclosing the rainforest exhibit

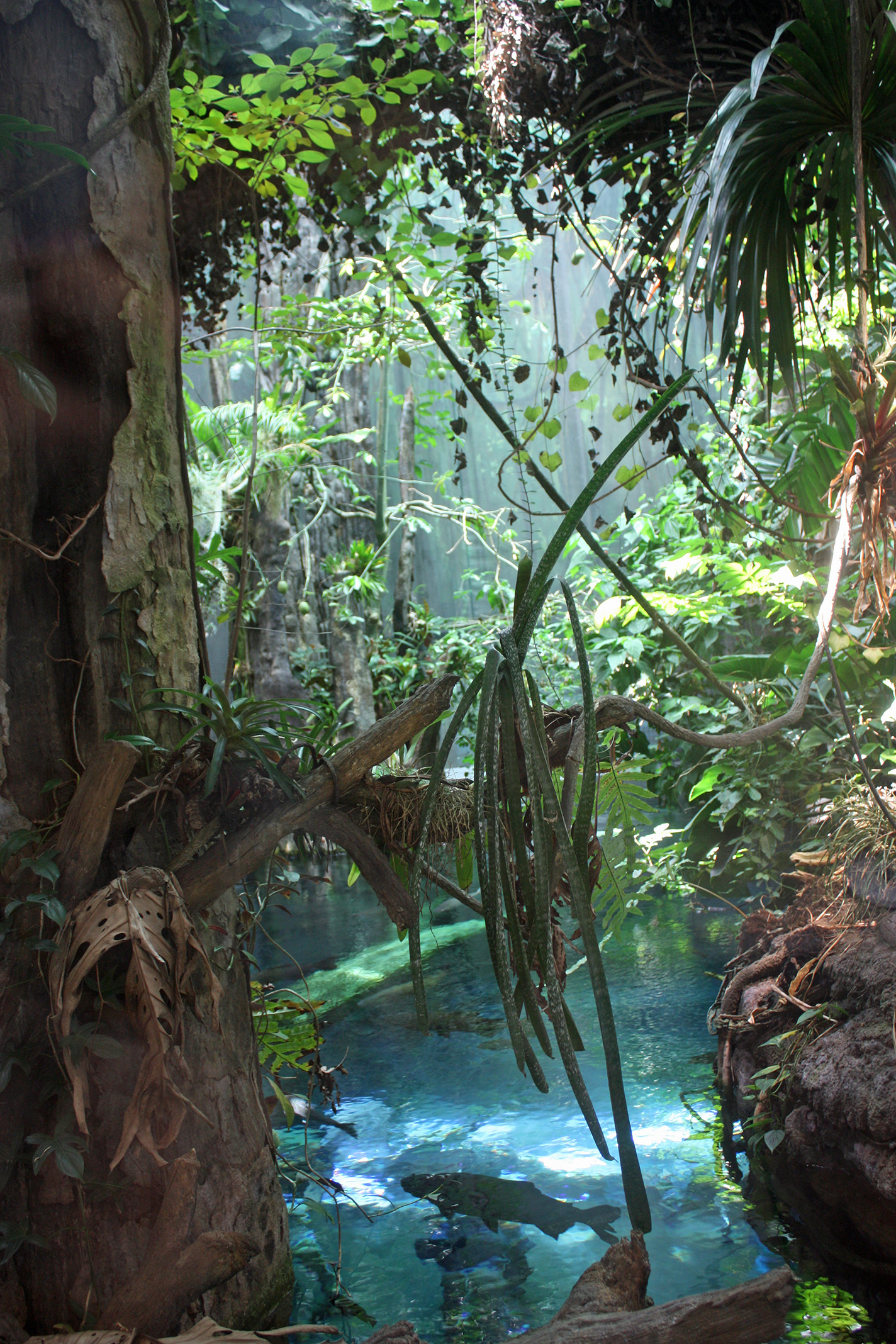
View of the Amazonian flooded forest in the rainforest exhibit. Arapaima, arowana, catfish, pacus, cichlids and other fish species can be seen from a submerged acrylic tunnel.

The main thrust of the exhibits is natural history. The venues of the museum include the following:

- Kimball Natural History Museum – generally encompasses the entire museum outside the planetarium, rainforest, and aquarium, and includes Africa Hall (the Academy's oldest running exhibit), the East Wing (includes a Foucault pendulum, also a carry-over exhibit from the older, pre-2008 renovation of the Academy), the West Wing (which as of 2020 housed several geophysical exhibits), as well as several smaller exhibits distributed throughout the remainder of the Academy building.
- Morrison Planetarium – features a digitally controlled planetarium dome measuring 90 feet (27 m) in diameter with a 75 feet (23 m) diameter screen.
- Rainforests of the World – rainforest exhibit enclosed in a 90-foot (27 m) glass dome.
- Steinhart Aquarium – includes exhibits of coral reefs, tide pools, and swamp habitats. Accredited by the Association of Zoos and Aquariums.

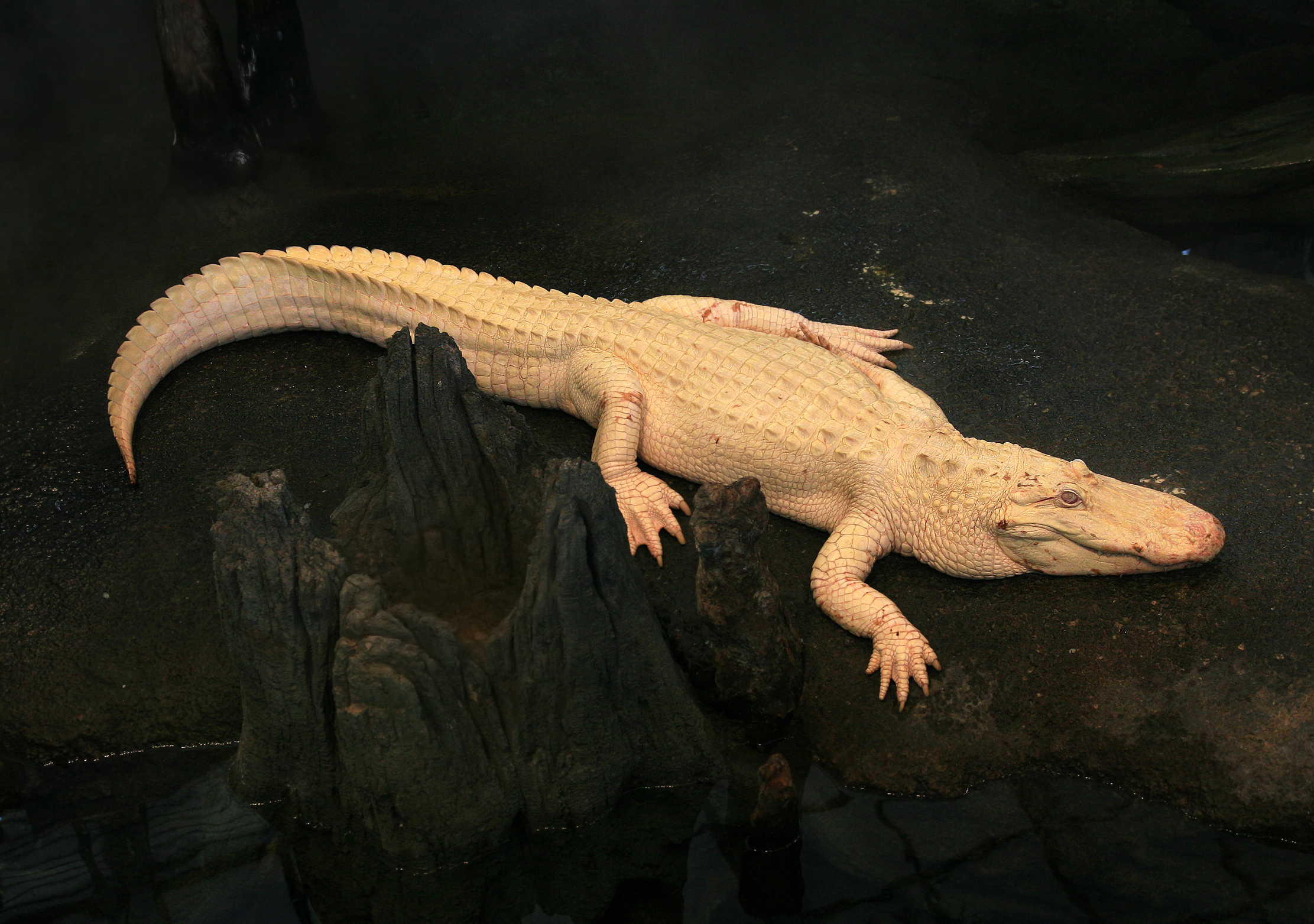
A rare albino American alligator named Claude

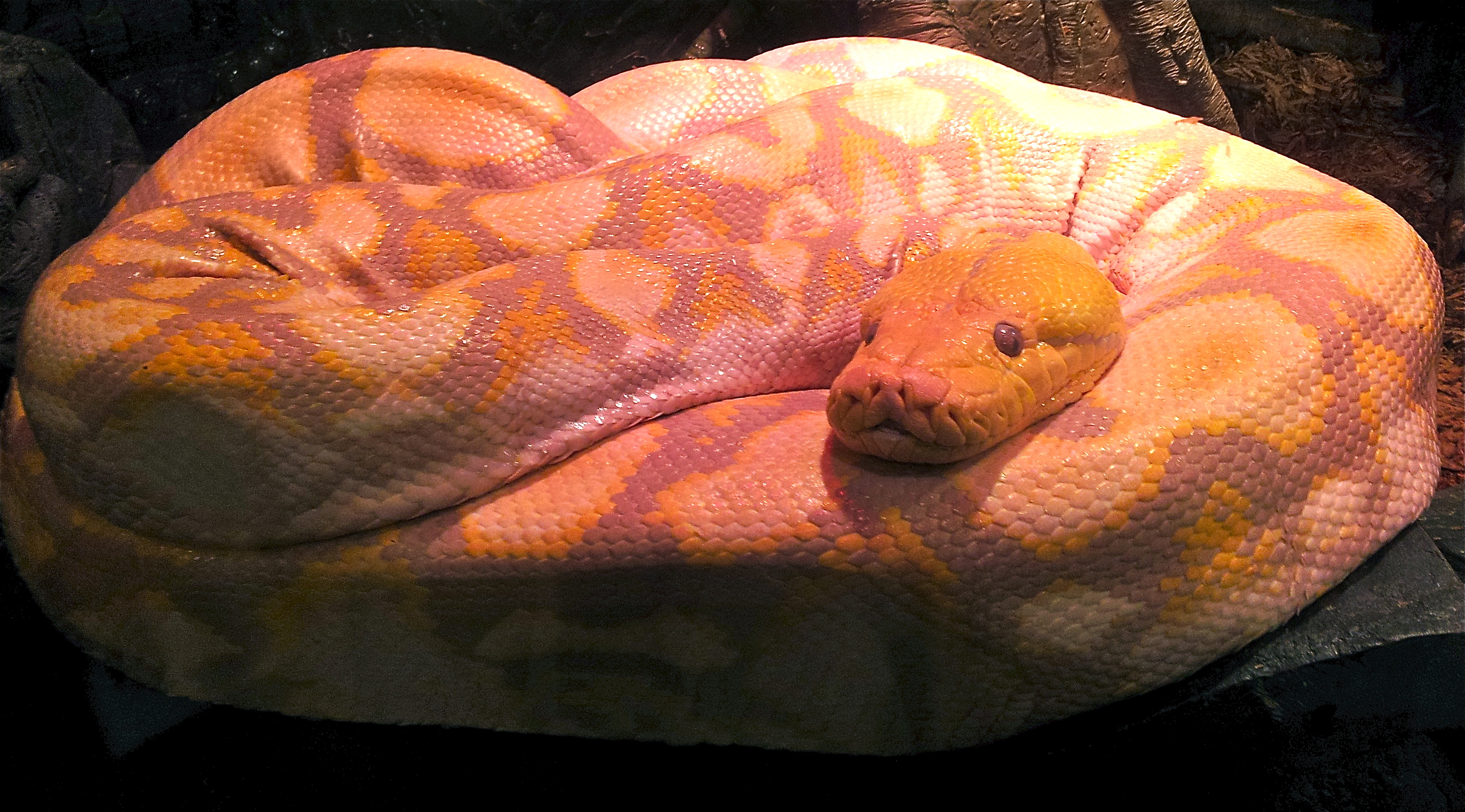
An albino reticulated python named Lemondrop

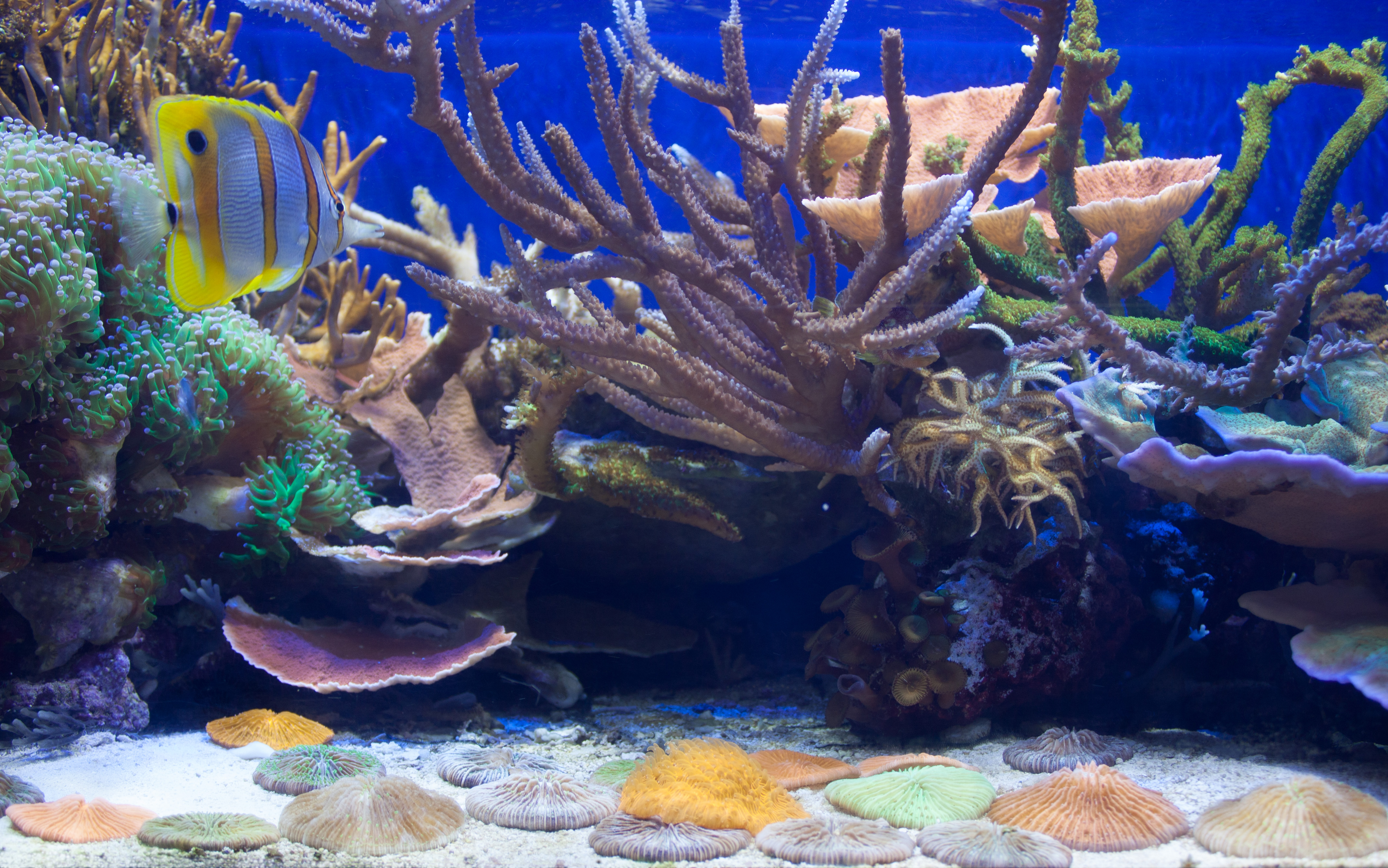
One of the smaller coral exhibits in the aquarium

- Penguin Habitat – features a colony of African penguins.

Besides its museum programs, the California Academy of Sciences offers many educational and community outreach programs to members of the public at large.

== Research ==
Academy scientists, under the Academy's Institute for Biodiversity Science and Sustainability, conduct systematic and conservation research in several different fields, including anthropology, marine biology, botany, entomology, herpetology, ichthyology, invertebrate zoology, mammalogy, ornithology, geology, and paleontology. There also is a strong emphasis on environmental concerns, with all the various departments collaborating closely to focus on systematic biology and biodiversity. Academy researchers study life around the world: a 2011 expedition to the Philippines discovered an estimated 300 species new to science. The Academy publishes the peer-reviewed journal Proceedings of the California Academy of Sciences, as well as Occasional Papers, Memoirs, and Special Publications.

== History ==
=== Early years ===
The California Academy of Natural Sciences was founded in 1853, only three years after California joined the United States, becoming the first society of its kind in the Western US. Its stated aim was to undertake "a thorough systematic survey of every portion of the State and the collection of a cabinet of her rare and rich productions." It was renamed as the more inclusive California Academy of Sciences in 1868.

The academy had a forward-thinking view towards women in science, passing a resolution in its first year that the members "highly approve of the aid of females in every department of natural science, and invite their cooperation." This policy led to several women being hired into professional positions as botanists, entomologists, and other occupations during the 19th century, when opportunities for women in the sciences were limited, and often, those that existed were restricted to menial cataloging and calculation work. In 1892, Alice Eastwood, a botanist, was hired by the academy and worked there until she retired in 1949. She saved the academy's collection of plant type specimens when the academy was destroyed in the 1906 San Francisco earthquake, and built back up the other herbarium specimens that had been lost to over 300,000.

The academy's first official museum opened in 1874 at the corner of California and Dupont Streets (now Grant Avenue) in what is now Chinatown, and drew up to 80,000 visitors a year. To accommodate its increasing popularity, the academy moved to a new and larger building on Market Street in 1891, funded by the legacy of James Lick, a 19th-century San Francisco real estate mogul, entrepreneur, and philanthropist.

However, only fifteen years later, the Market Street facility fell victim to the 1906 San Francisco earthquake and three days of fire, which also wiped out all but a wheelbarrow full of the academy's library and specimen collections. In the widespread destruction occurring in the aftermath of the quake, academy curators and staffers only were able to retrieve a single cart of materials, including academy minute books, membership records, and 2,000 type specimens. The 1905–1906 scientific collecting expedition to the Galápagos Islands (the first of several sponsored by the academy to the archipelago) already was underway, and it returned seven months later, providing replacement collections for those lost.

=== Golden Gate Park site ===
In 1916, the Academy moved to the North American Hall of Birds and Mammals in Golden Gate Park, the first building on the site that was to become its permanent home. In 1923, the Steinhart Aquarium was added, followed in 1934 by the Simson African Hall.

During World War II, the Academy contributed to the American war effort by using its workshop facilities to repair optical and navigational equipment for United States Navy ships; San Francisco was a major port for the Pacific War arena.

The post-war years saw a flurry of new construction on the site; the Science Hall was added in 1951, followed by the Morrison Planetarium in 1952. The Morrison Planetarium was the seventh major planetarium to open in the United States and featured a one-of-a-kind star projector, built by Academy staff members (in part using the expertise gained doing the optical work for the US Navy during World War II). The Academy Projector projected irregularly shaped stars, rather than the circular stars projected by many optical star projectors. The irregular shapes were created by placing variously sized grains of silicon carbide onto the glass star plates by hand, then aluminizing the plates, and brushing away the silicon carbide grains.

In 1959, the Mailliard Library, Eastwood Hall of Botany, and Livermore Room all were added. Throughout the 1960s, universities concentrating on the new field of molecular biology divested themselves of their traditional specimen collections, entrusting them to the academy and leading to a rapid growth of the Academy's holdings.

In 1969, another new building, Cowell Hall, was added to the site. In 1976, several new galleries were opened, and the following year, in 1977, the "fish roundabout" was constructed.

Before the old building being torn down in 2005, there was a Life through Time gallery, housing a large display on evolution and paleontology. There was a Gem and Mineral Hall, a section on Earthquakes, and a Gary Larson exhibit.

=== Earthquake damage and new building ===
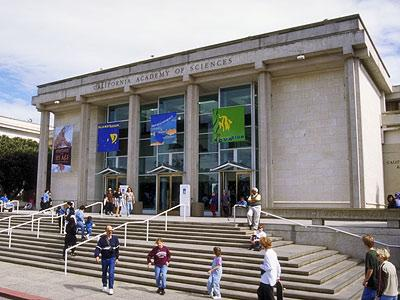
Academy of Sciences in 2003, two years before reconstruction began

The academy buildings were damaged significantly in the 1989 Loma Prieta earthquake. Subsequently, the Bird Hall building was closed to ensure public safety. The inadequately engineered Steinhart Aquarium suffered dramatic seismic damage from the 1989 earthquake, as well.

As plans were made to repair the damage and make the buildings seismically stable, it was realized that a considerable amount of work would be needed to bring the buildings up to modern standards. This led to the idea of giving the academy a complete overhaul, thus motivating the closing of the main site.

Construction began on the new $500 million building on September 12, 2005, while the exhibits were moved to 875 Howard Street for a temporary museum.

The academy reopened with a free day on September 27, 2008. For most of the day, the line for admittance was over a mile (nearly two kilometers) long, and although over 15,000 people were admitted, several thousands more had to be turned away.

In May 2020, during the COVID-19 pandemic, the Academy announced that it would lay off 105 of its then 504 employees, furlough 96 others, and enact pay cuts among part of the rest. Due to the COVID-19 lockdown's effect on ticket sales, the organization was expecting its revenue to decrease by around $12 million (36%) in the next fiscal year. In April 2026, the Academy announced that it would lay off 53 staff, or approximately 9.3% of their workforce, and restructure the roles of 32 others, due to a projected cash deficit of $8 million.

== Environmental design of new building ==
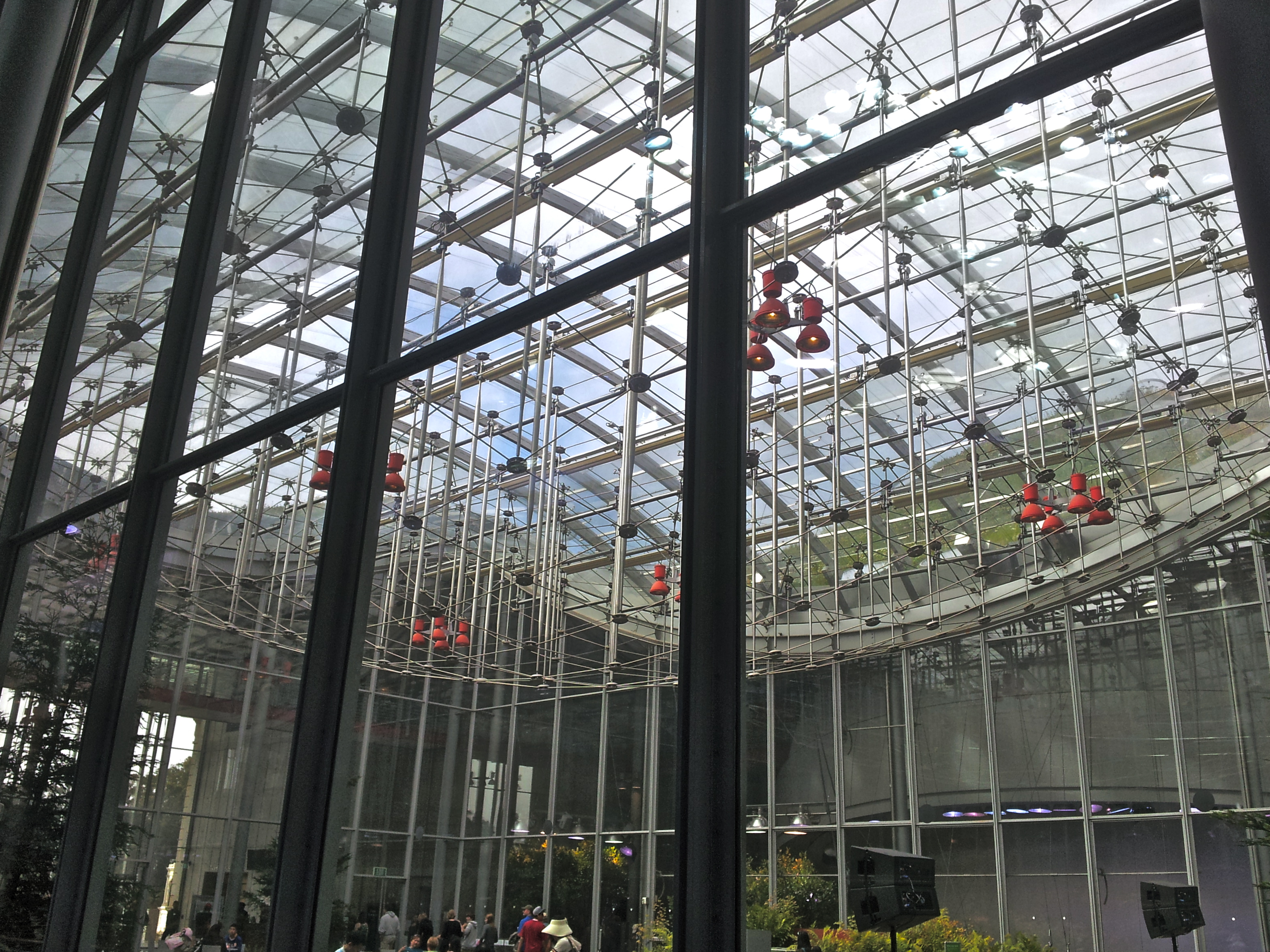
The piazza behind the main entrance is flooded with natural light

The design architect for the museum replacement project was Renzo Piano. His design was awarded the Urban Land Institute (ULI) Award for Excellence for the Americas region in 2008, as well as the Holcim Award Silver for sustainable construction projects in the North America region in 2005. One critic praised the building as a "blazingly uncynical embrace of the Enlightenment values of truth and reason", and a "comforting reminder of the civilizing function of great art in a barbaric age".

The new building emphasizes environmentally friendly design, in keeping with the academy's focus on ecological concerns and environmental sustainability. It received Platinum certification under the LEED program. This project was featured on the Discovery Channel Extreme Engineering series in 2006, the National Geographic Channel Man-Made series in July 2008, and Smithsonian Channel's How Do They Build That? in August 2022.

The new building includes an array of environmentally friendly features:

- Produces 50 percent less waste water than previously
- Recycles rainwater for irrigation
- Uses 60,000 photovoltaic cells
- Supports a green roof with an area of 2.5 acres (1.0 hectare)
- Uses natural lighting in 90 percent of occupied spaces
- Was constructed of over 20,000 cubic yards (15,000 m^{3}) of recycled concrete
- Construction includes 11 million pounds (5,000 t) of recycled steel
- Wall insulation made from scraps of recycled denim

=== Green roof ===
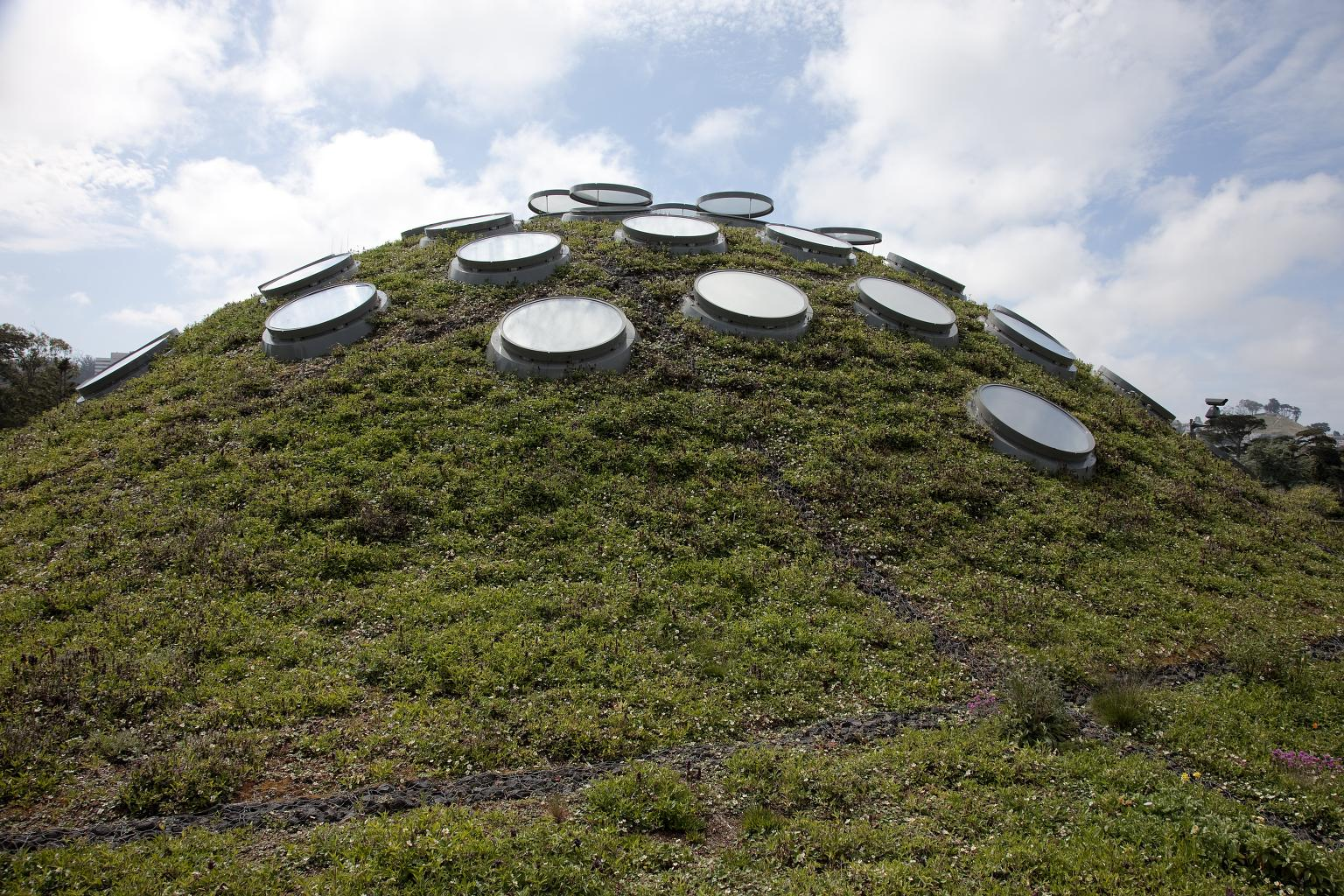
A detail of the green, living roof, in 2009

The California Academy of Sciences green roof has several environmentally friendly features and a sustainable design. Renzo Piano was inspired by seven major hills of San Francisco, which typically refers to: Telegraph Hill, Nob Hill, Russian Hill, Rincon Hill, Mount Sutro, Twin Peaks and Mount Davidson. The living green roof was planted with 1.7 million California native plants. The museum's central piazza lies beneath a massive glass ceiling on the roof, which opens to allow cool night air to flow into the building below; by using this kind of natural ventilation instead of air conditioning to regulate interior temperature, the building becomes more energy efficient. Renzo Piano and SWA Group won the American Society of Landscape Architects (ASLA) Award in design in 2009.

== Notable people ==
Notable staff members of the academy include:

- Alice Eastwood (botanist), 1892–1949
- David Starr Jordan (ichthyologist), president, 1896-1913
- Frank Talbot (ichthyologist and marine biologist), director, 1982–1989

== Gallery ==
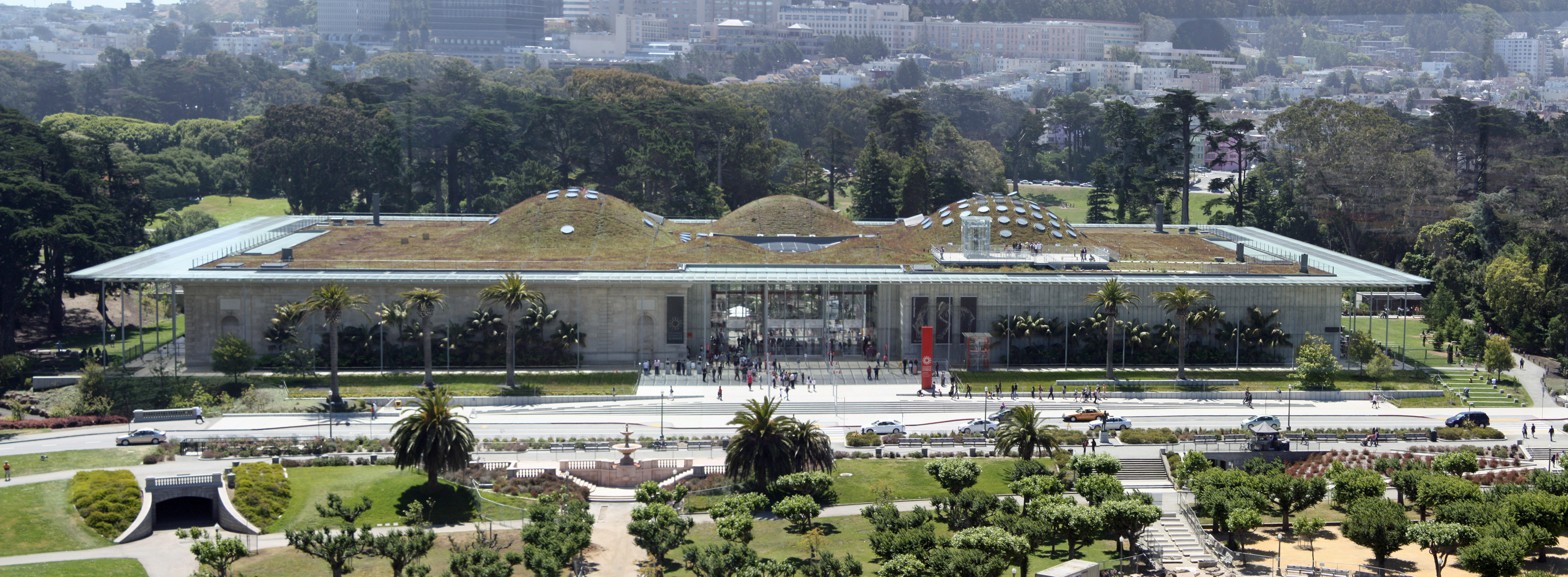
California Academy of Sciences, viewed from the tower of the de Young Museum
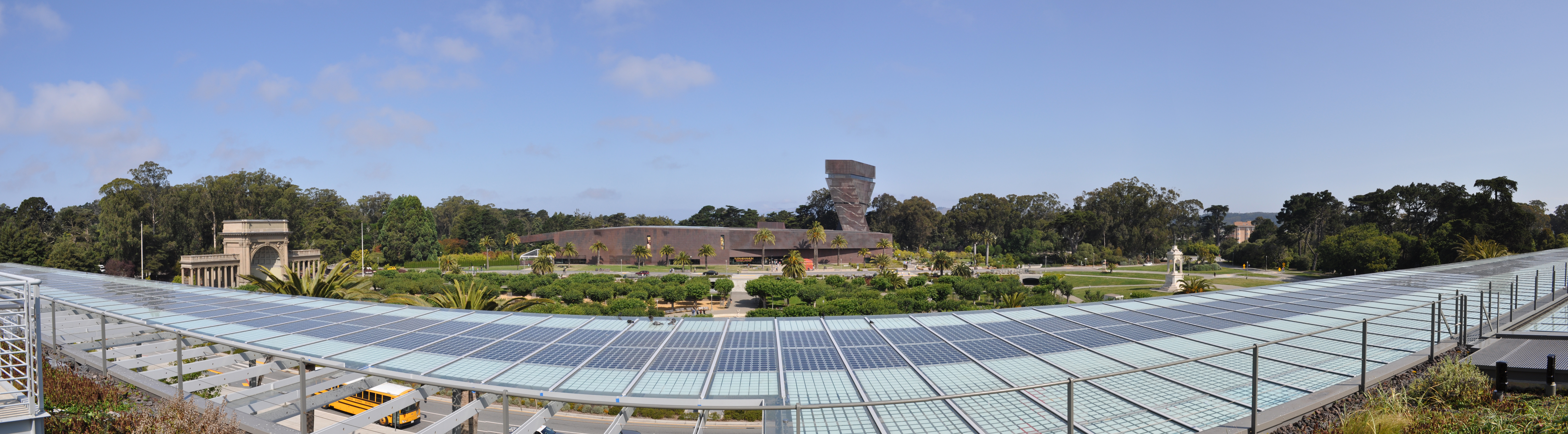
Panoramic roof view across the Music Concourse to the de Young Museum is underscored by an array of solar cells
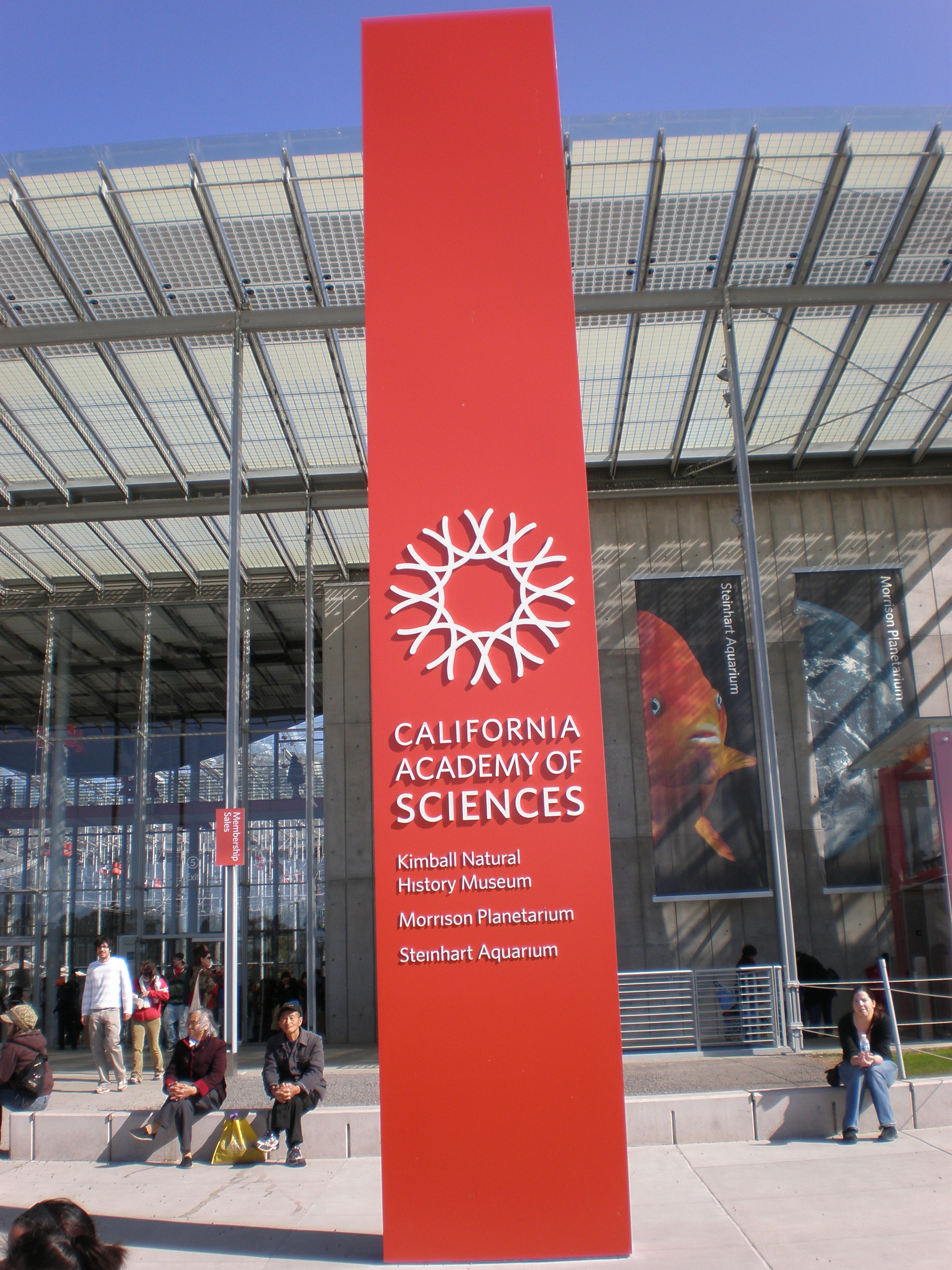
Main entry

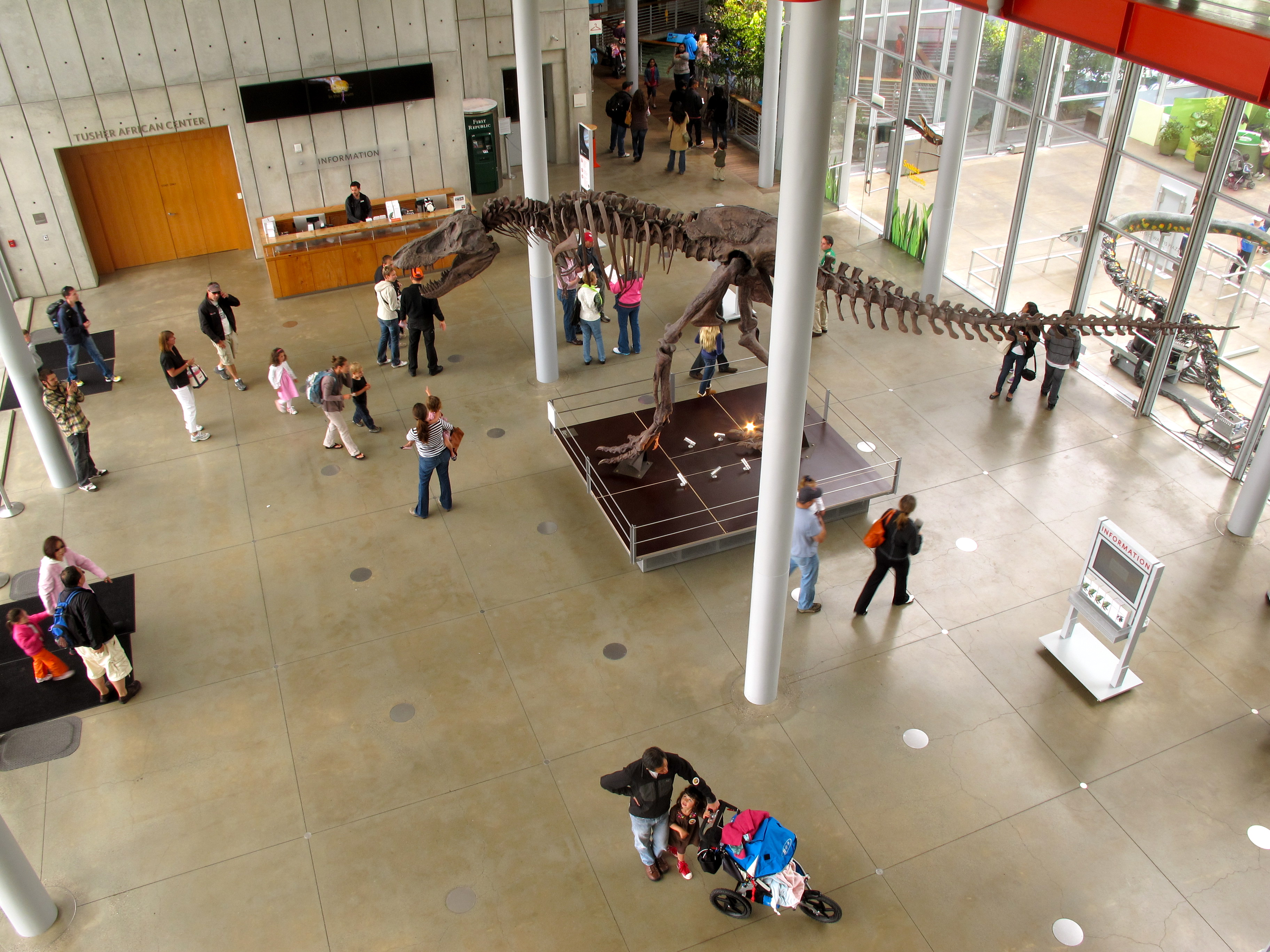
Entrance lobby lit from skylights

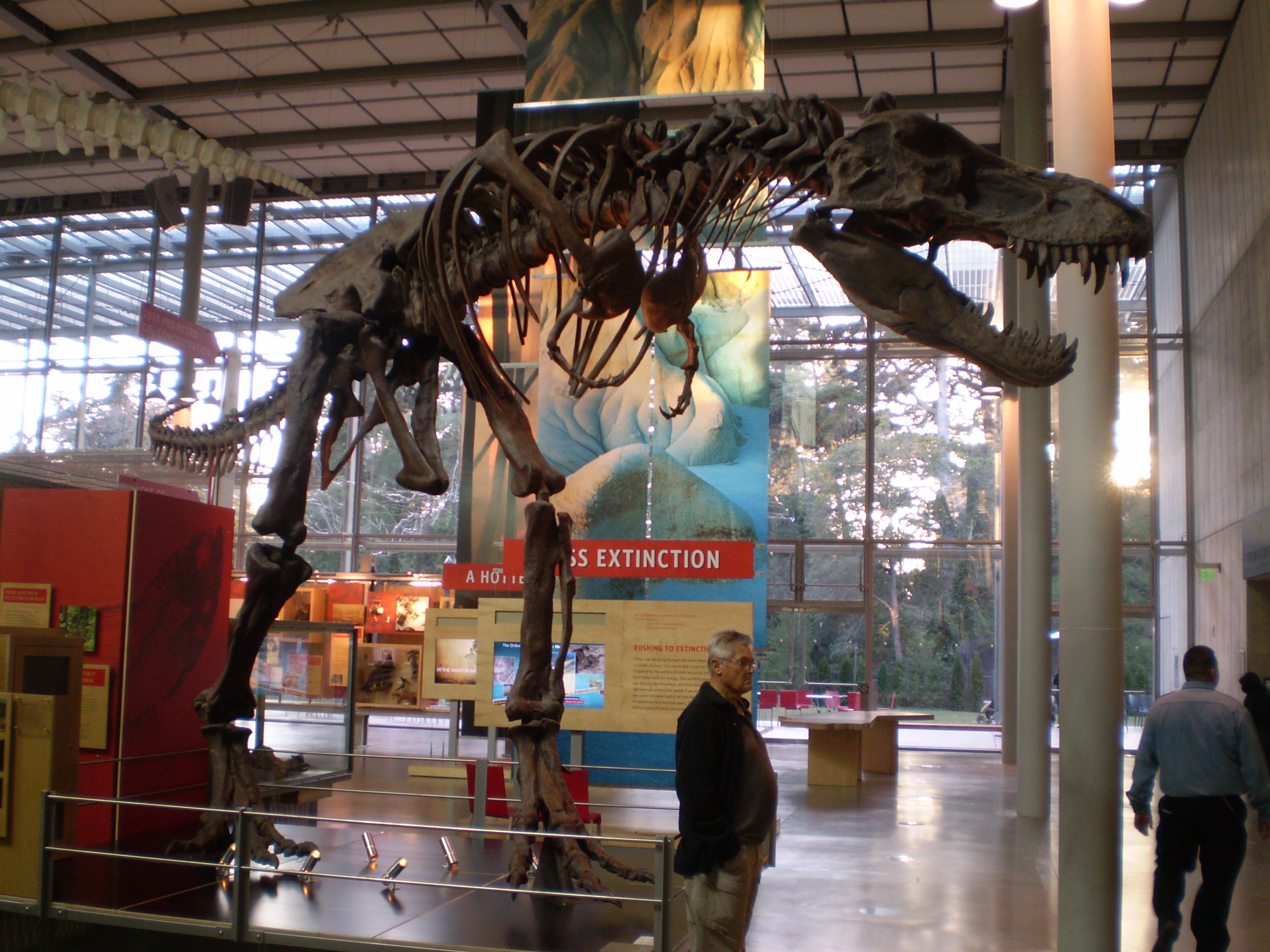
Skeleton of Tyrannosaurus rex

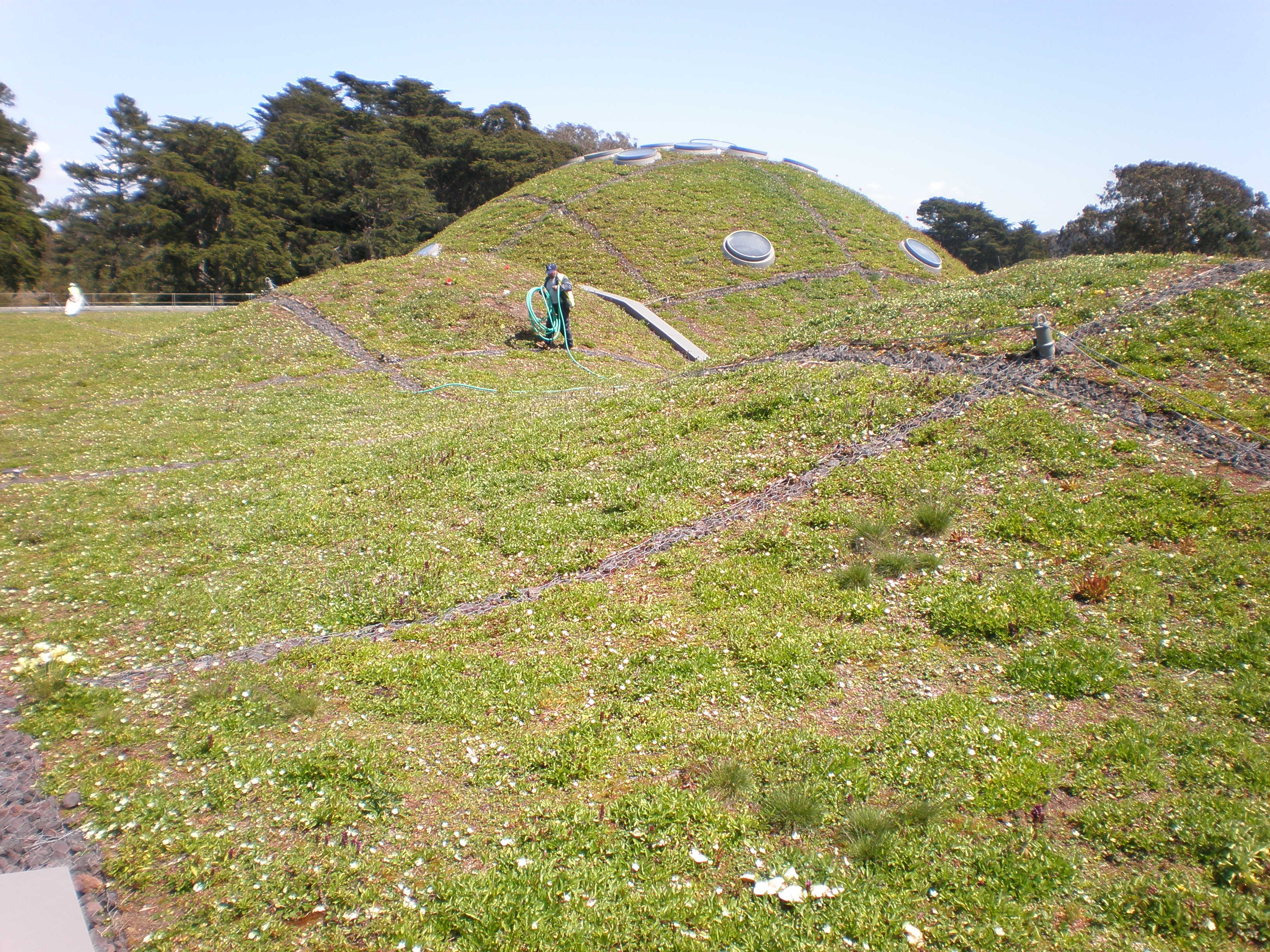
Gardener reveals scale of the roof landscape

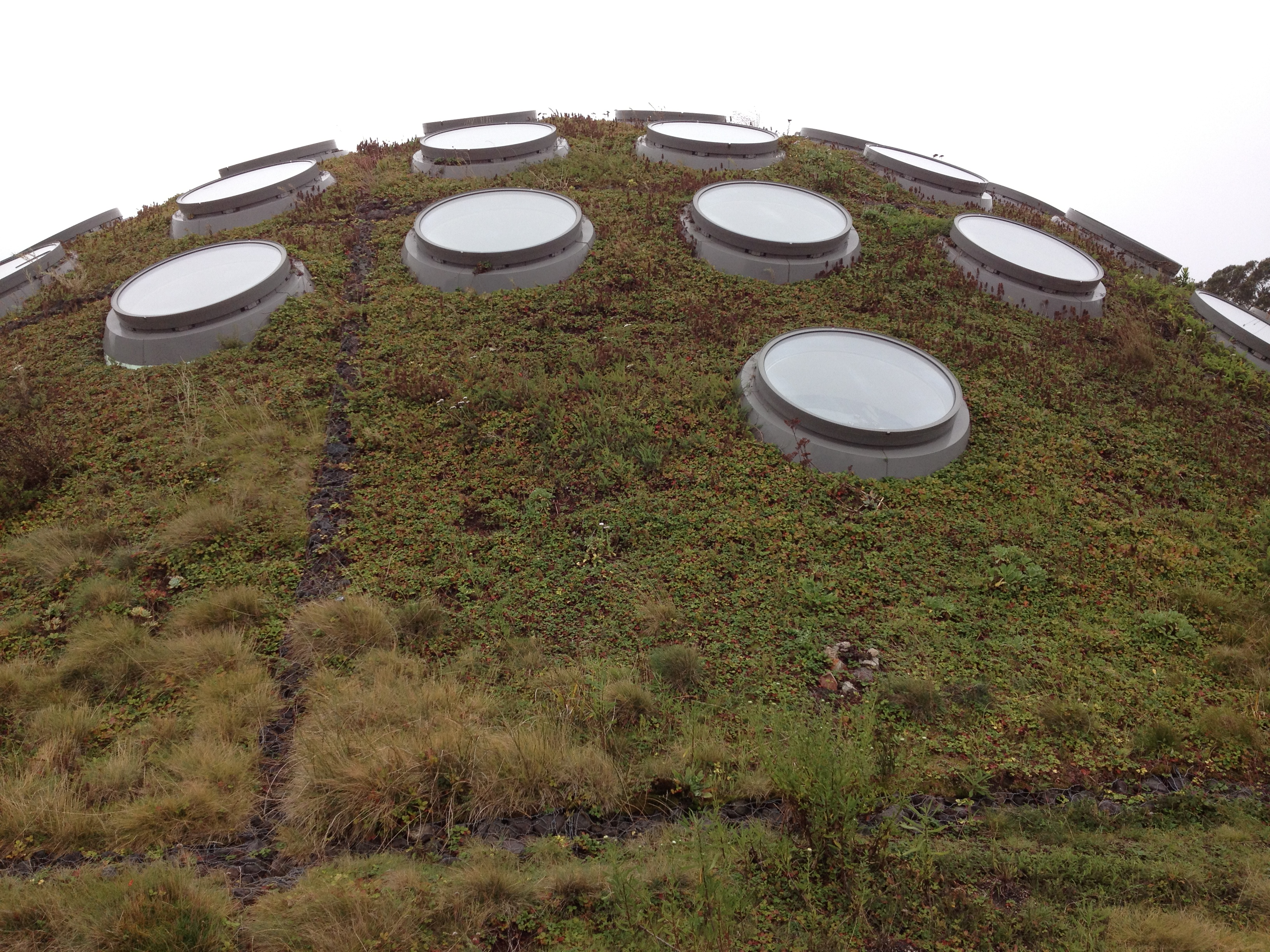
Native vegetation, during the dry season

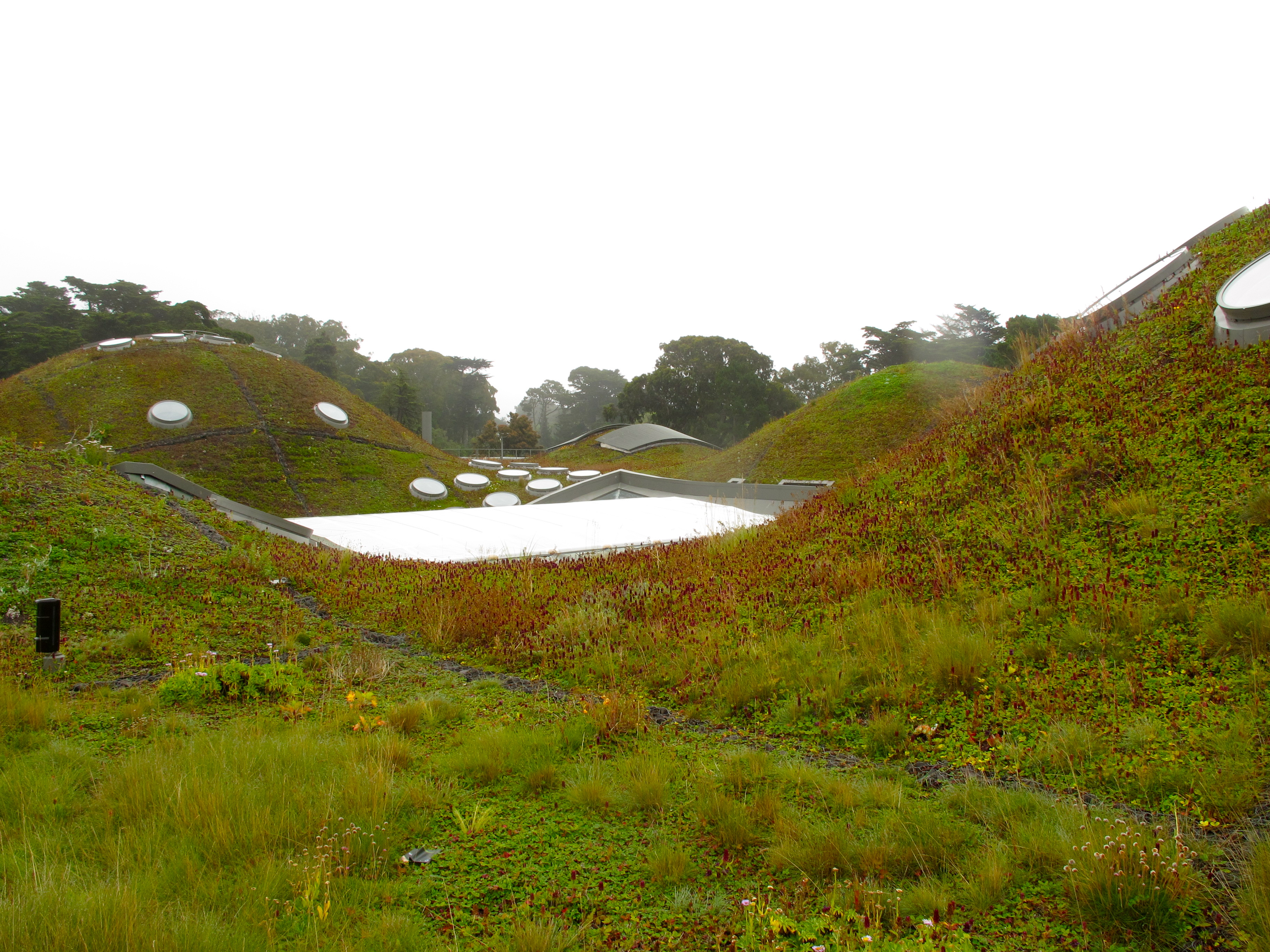
Roofscape resembles a hilly meadow

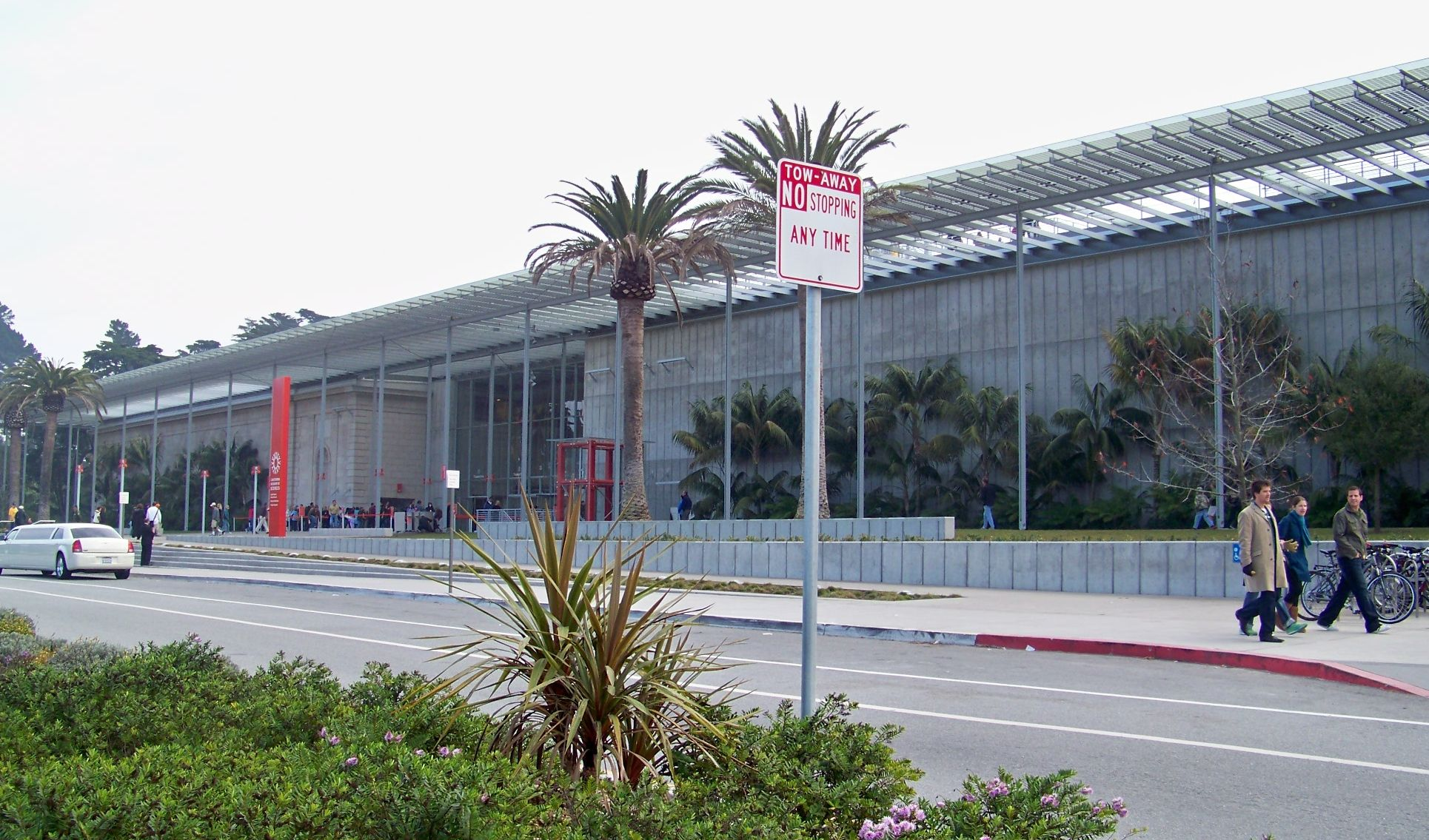
Overhead solar cells shade the entry facade

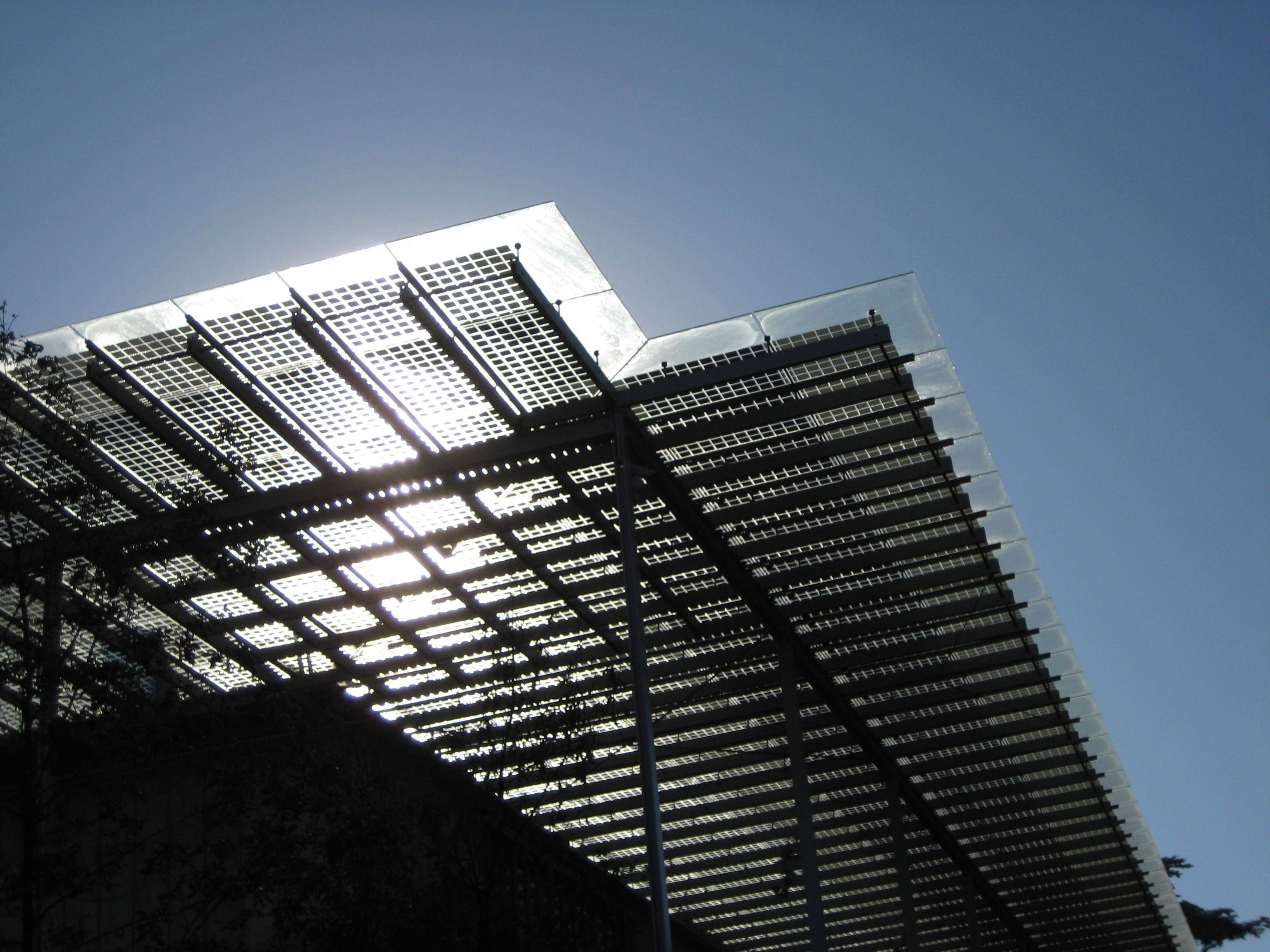
Solar cells, viewed from outdoors visitor waiting area

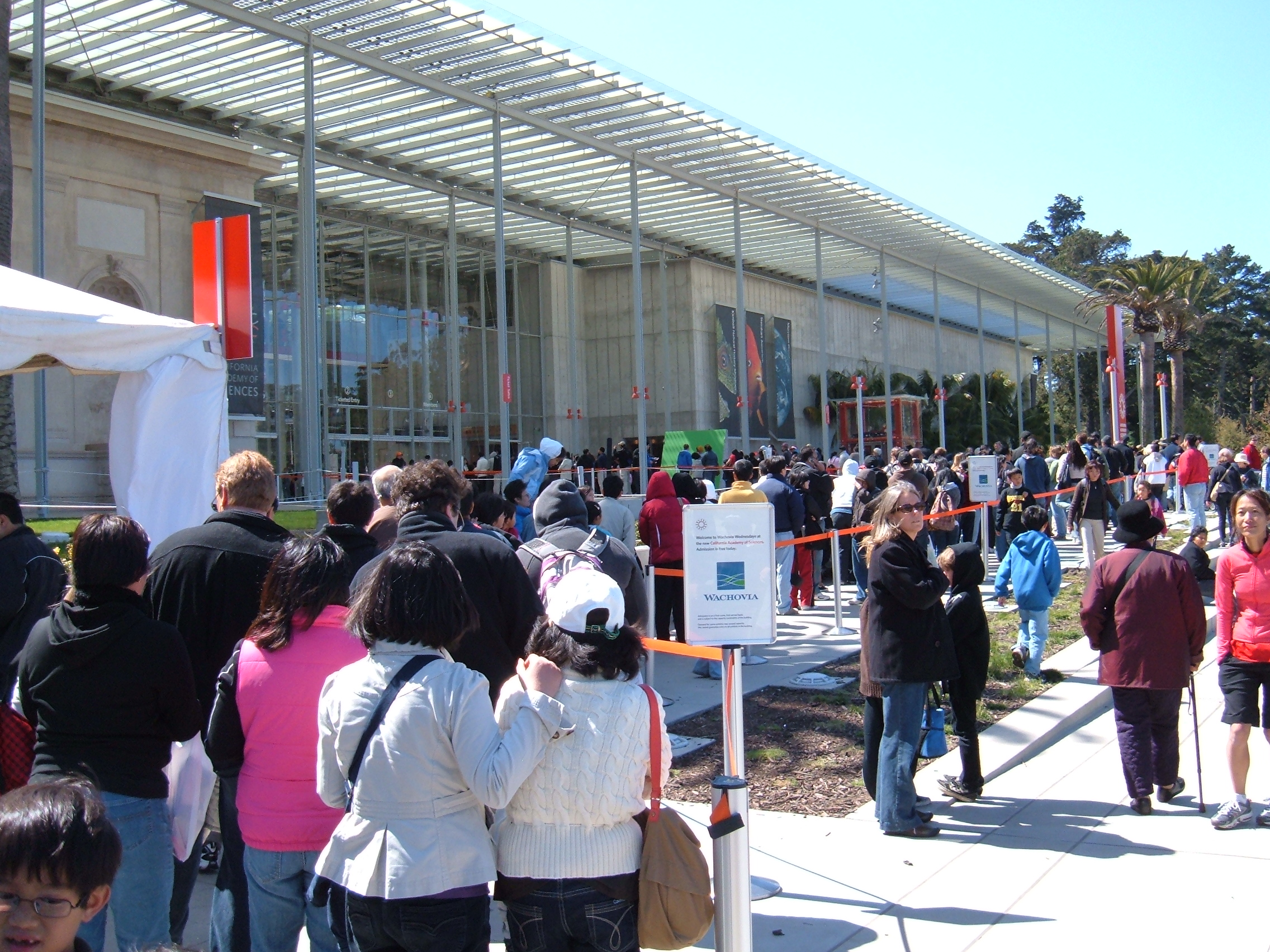
Visitor line on a monthly free admission day

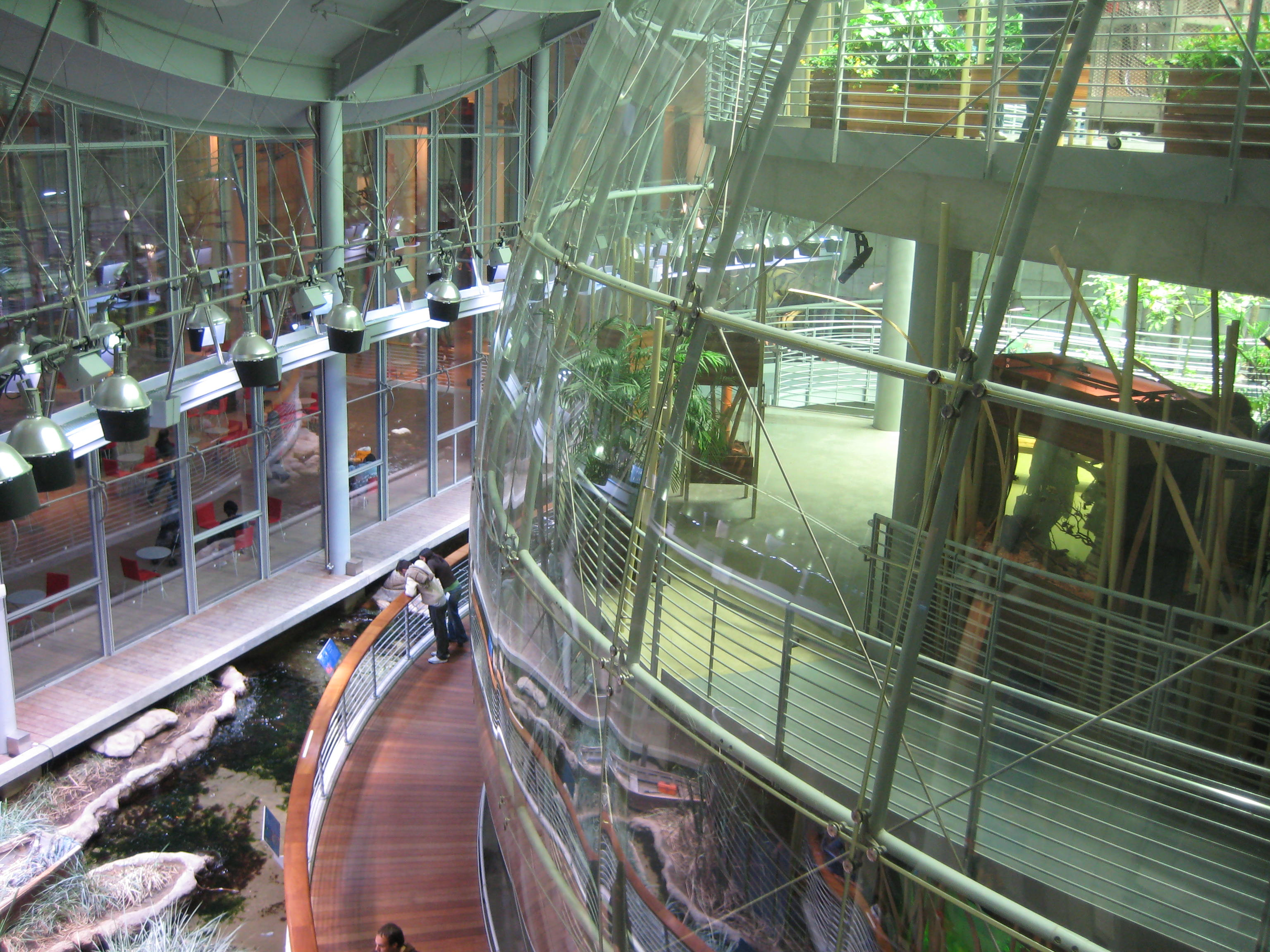
Rainforests of the World enclosure

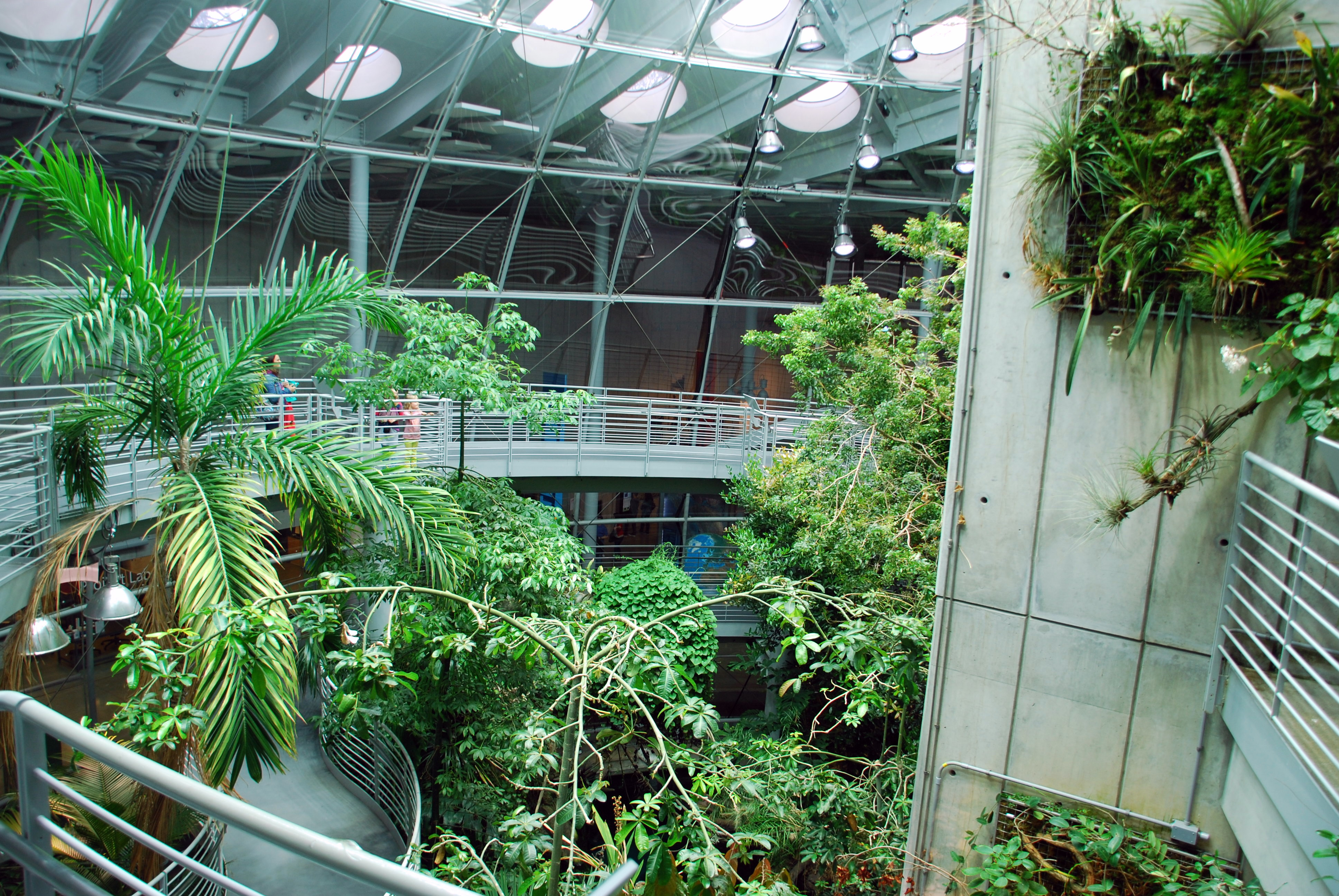
Interior of Rainforests of the World

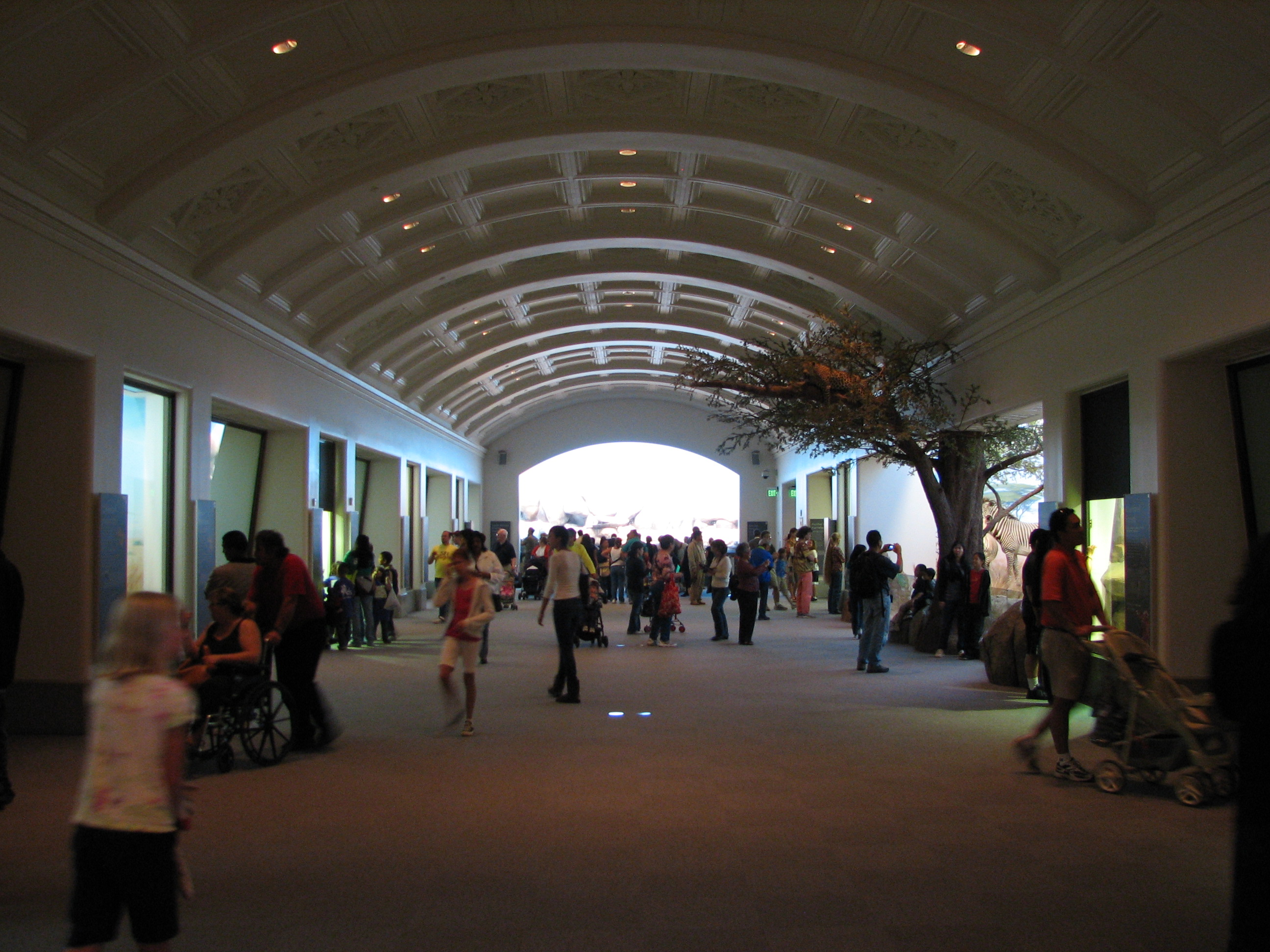
African Hall

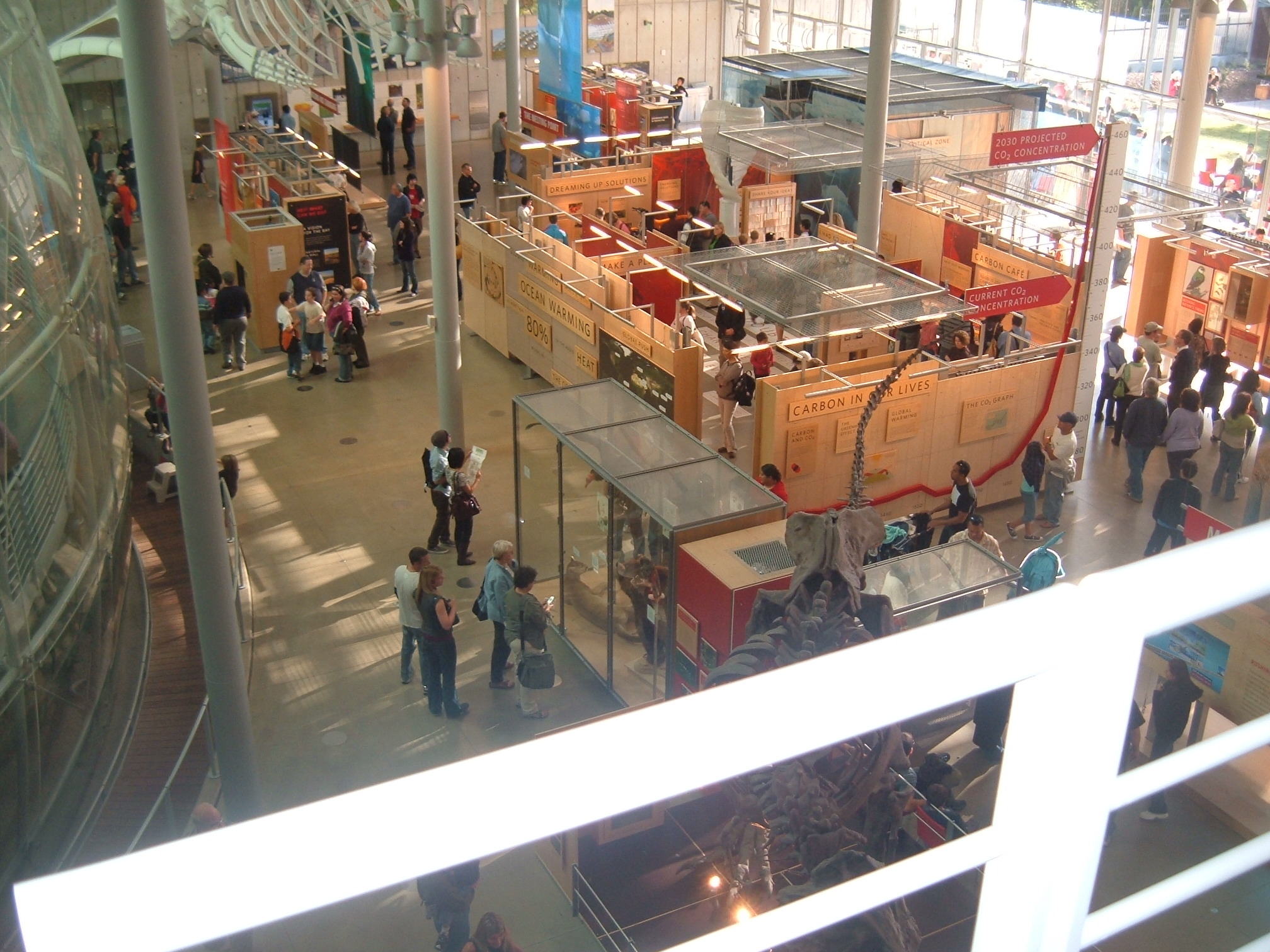
Exhibits on climate change

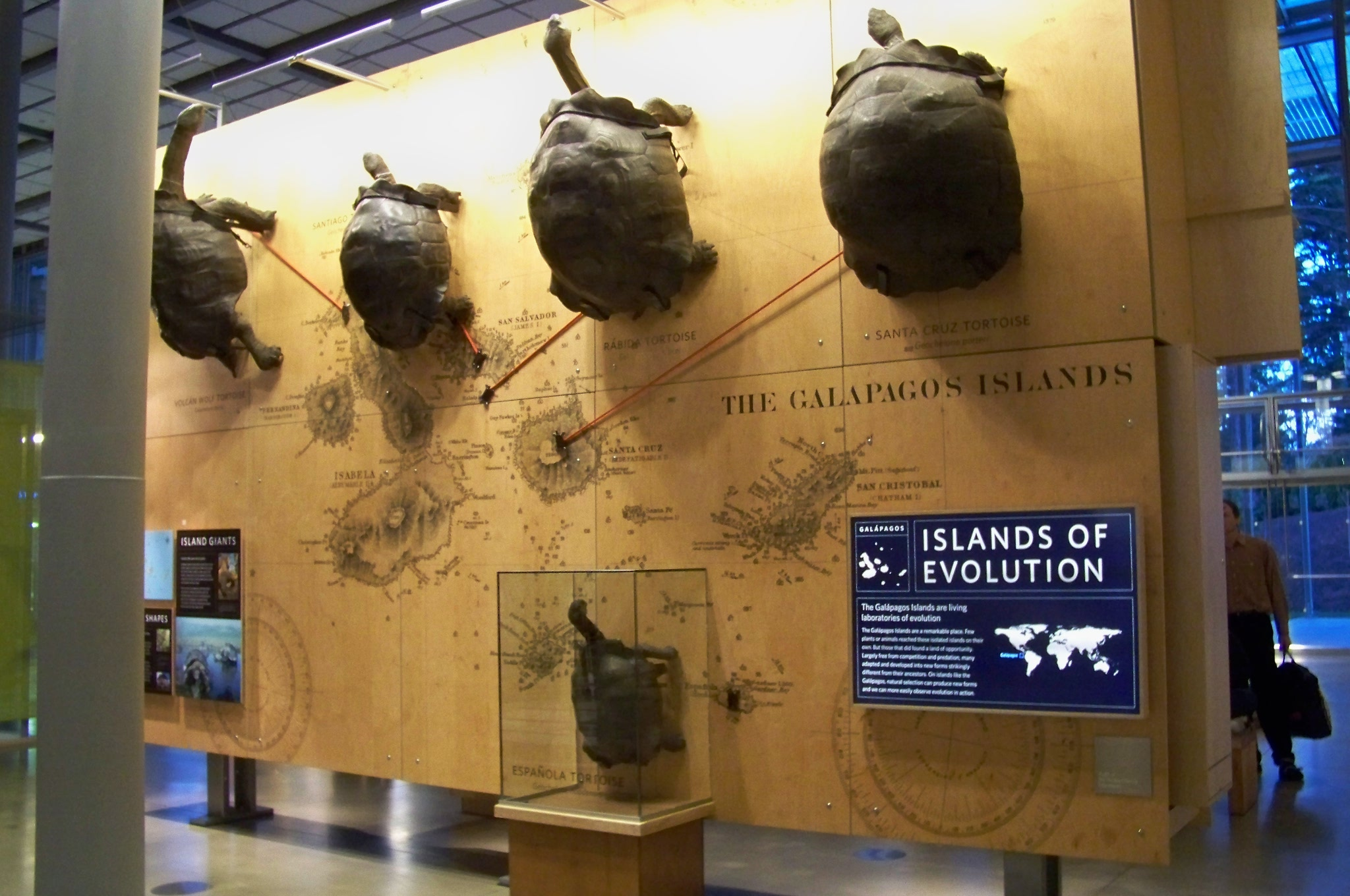
Exhibit about evolution

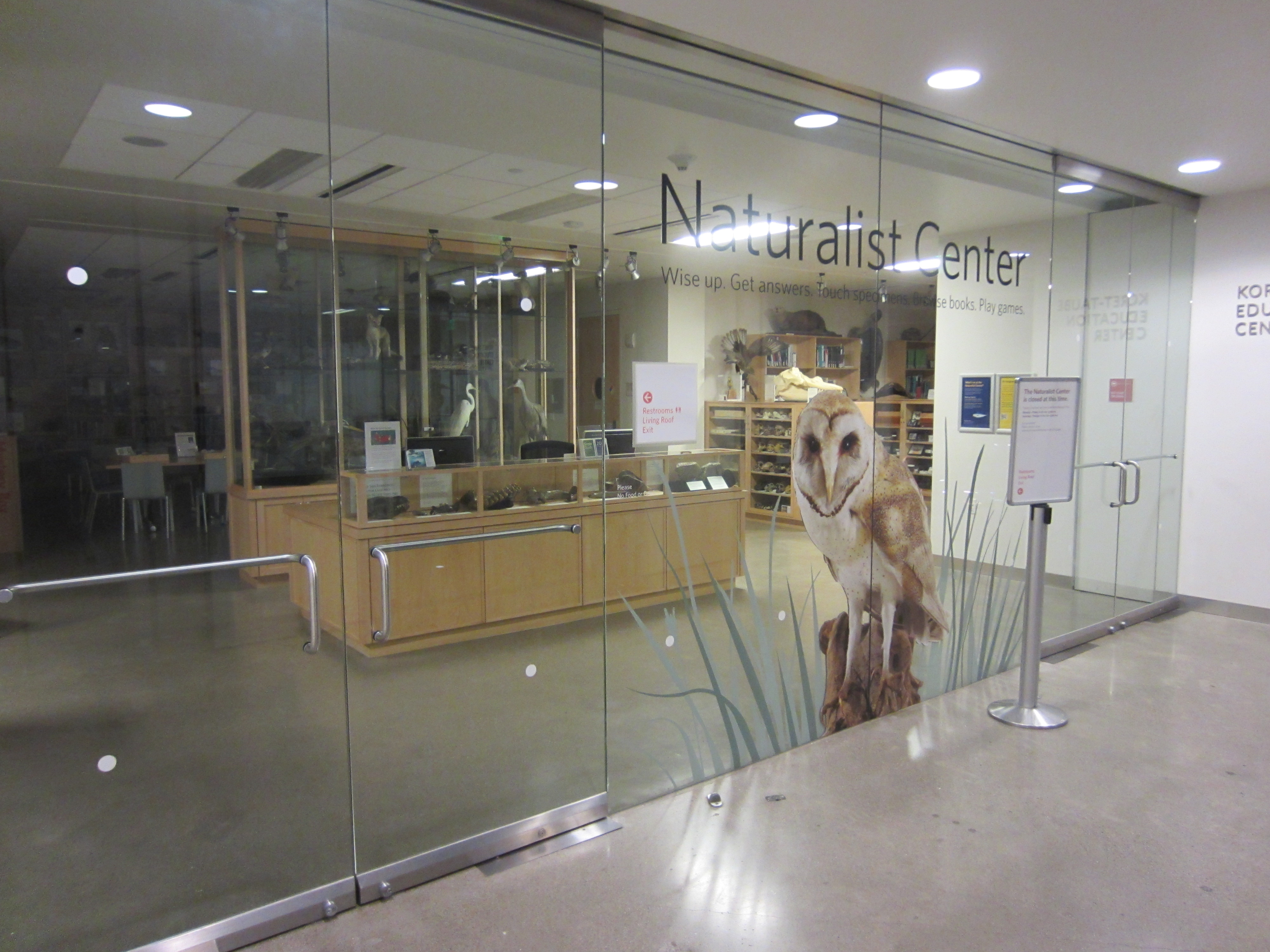
Nature resource center

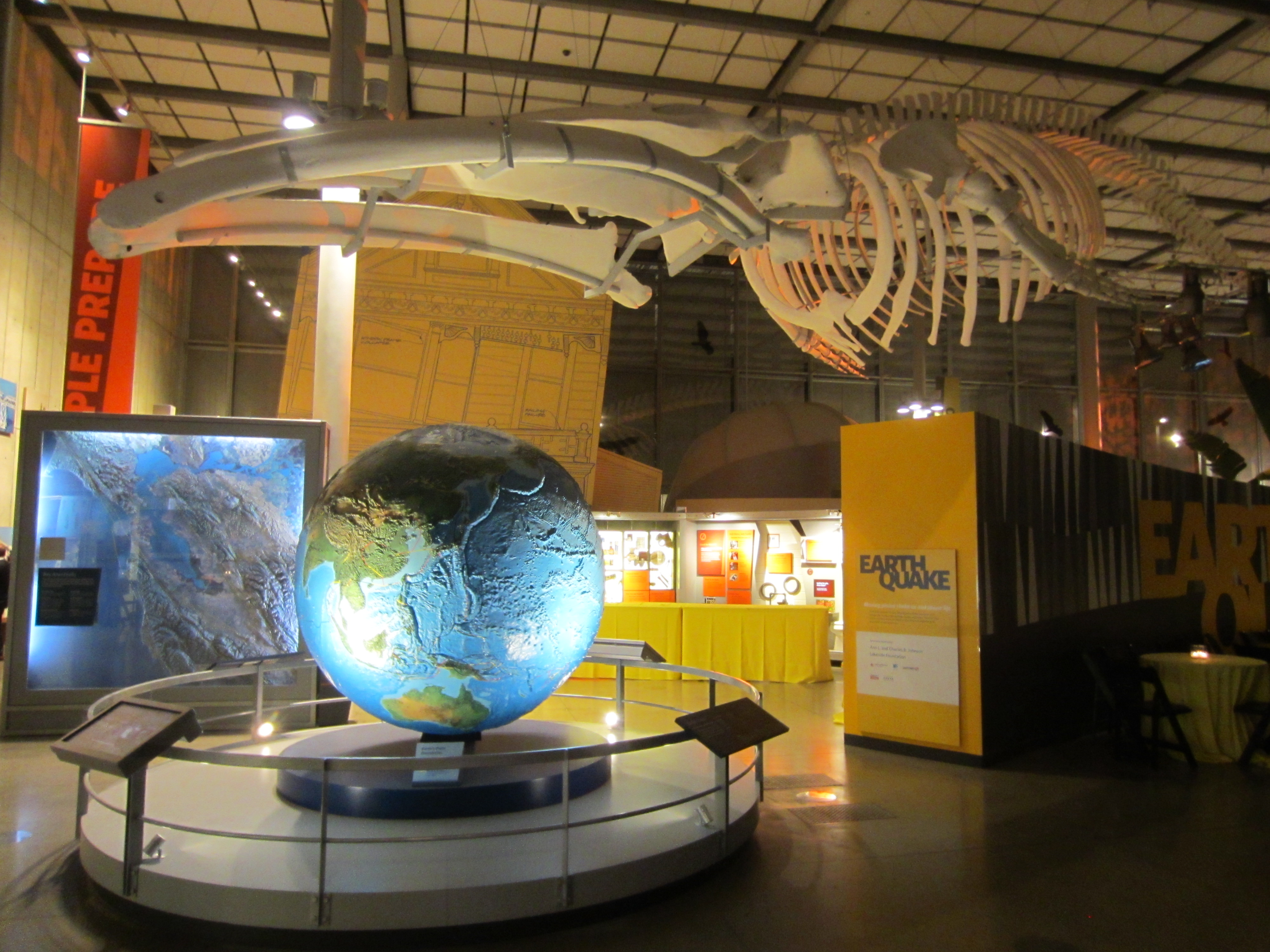
Whale skeleton above large raised relief globe

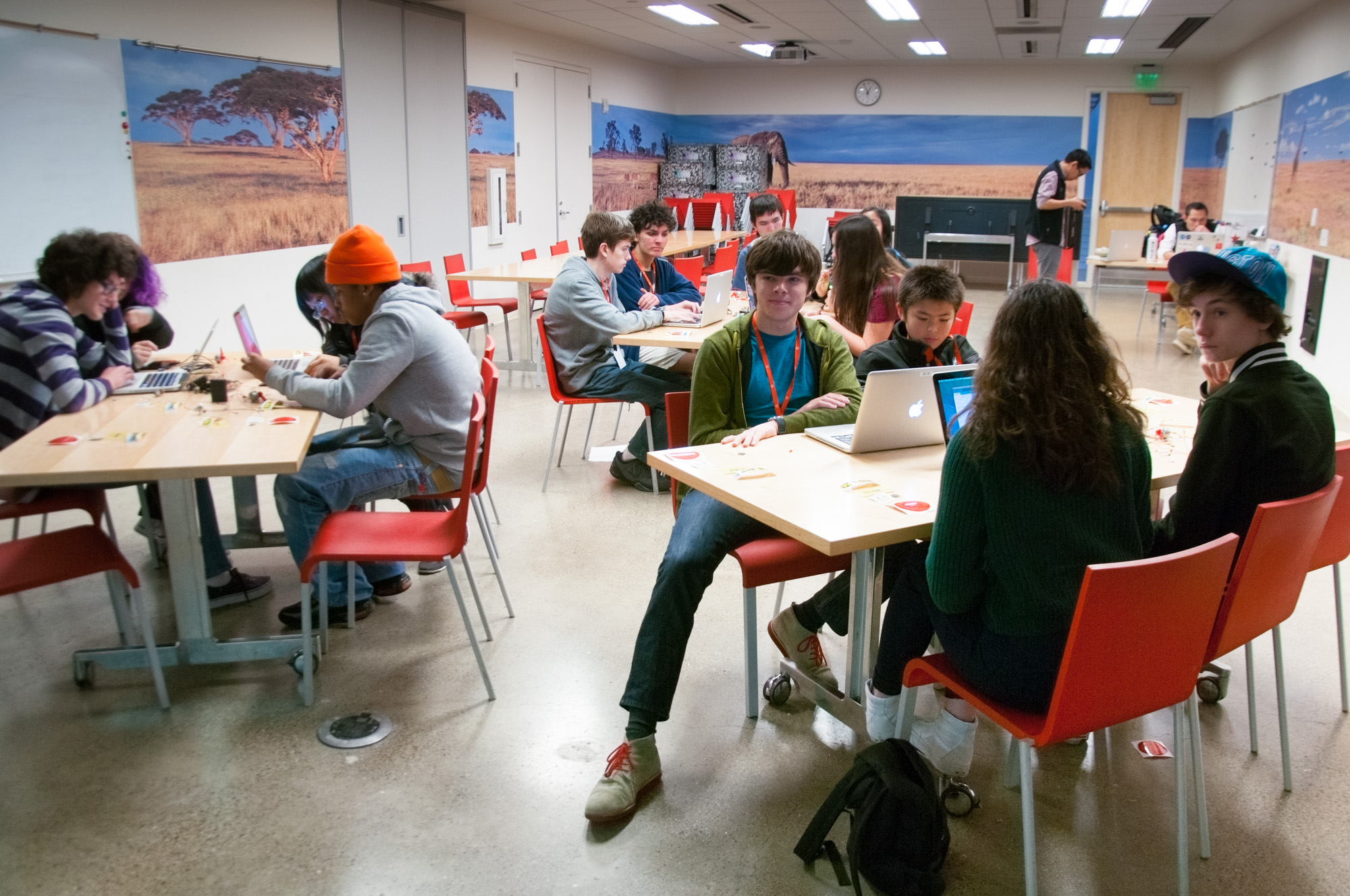
Nature Hacking Playshop

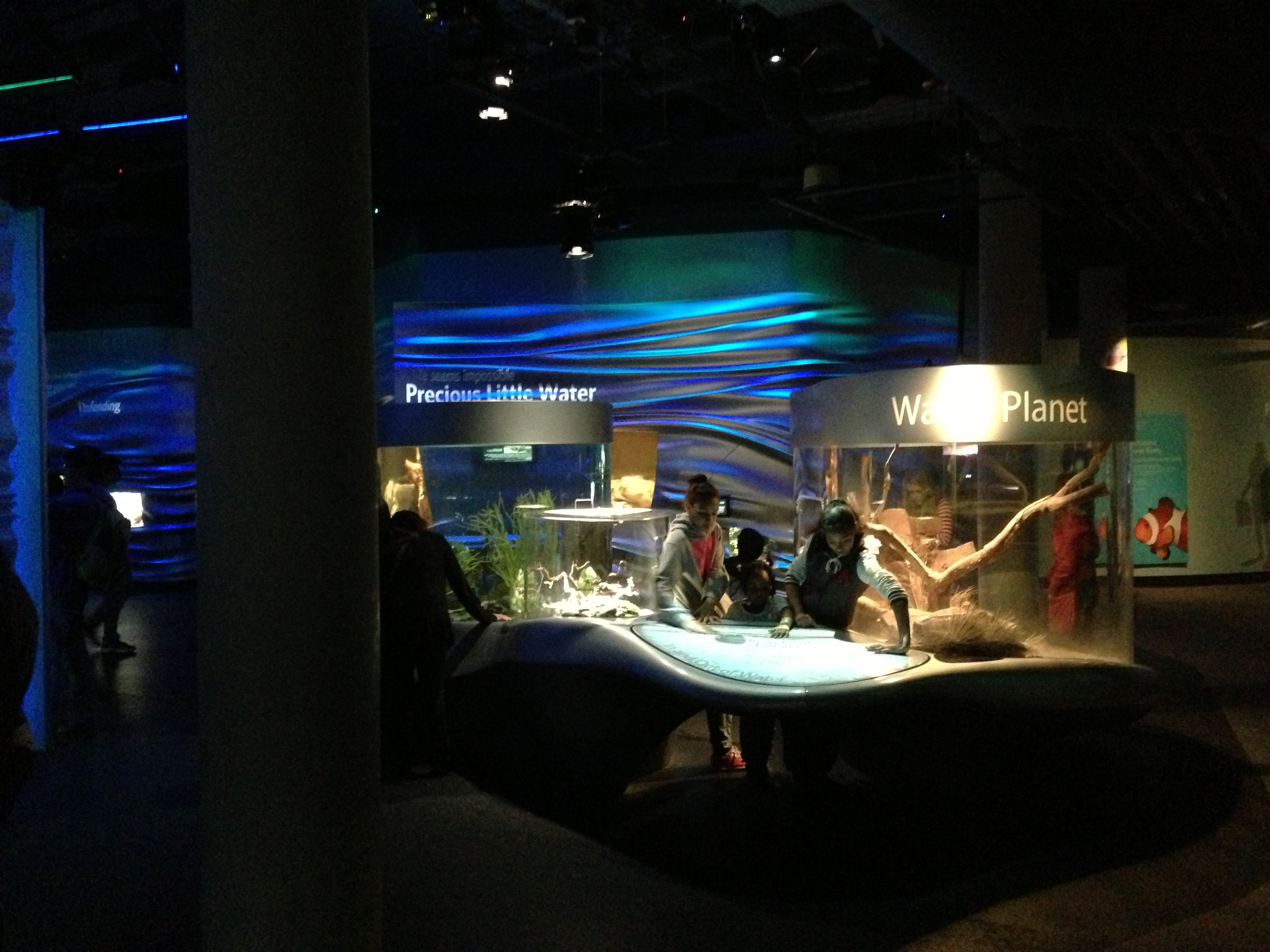
Steinhart Aquarium

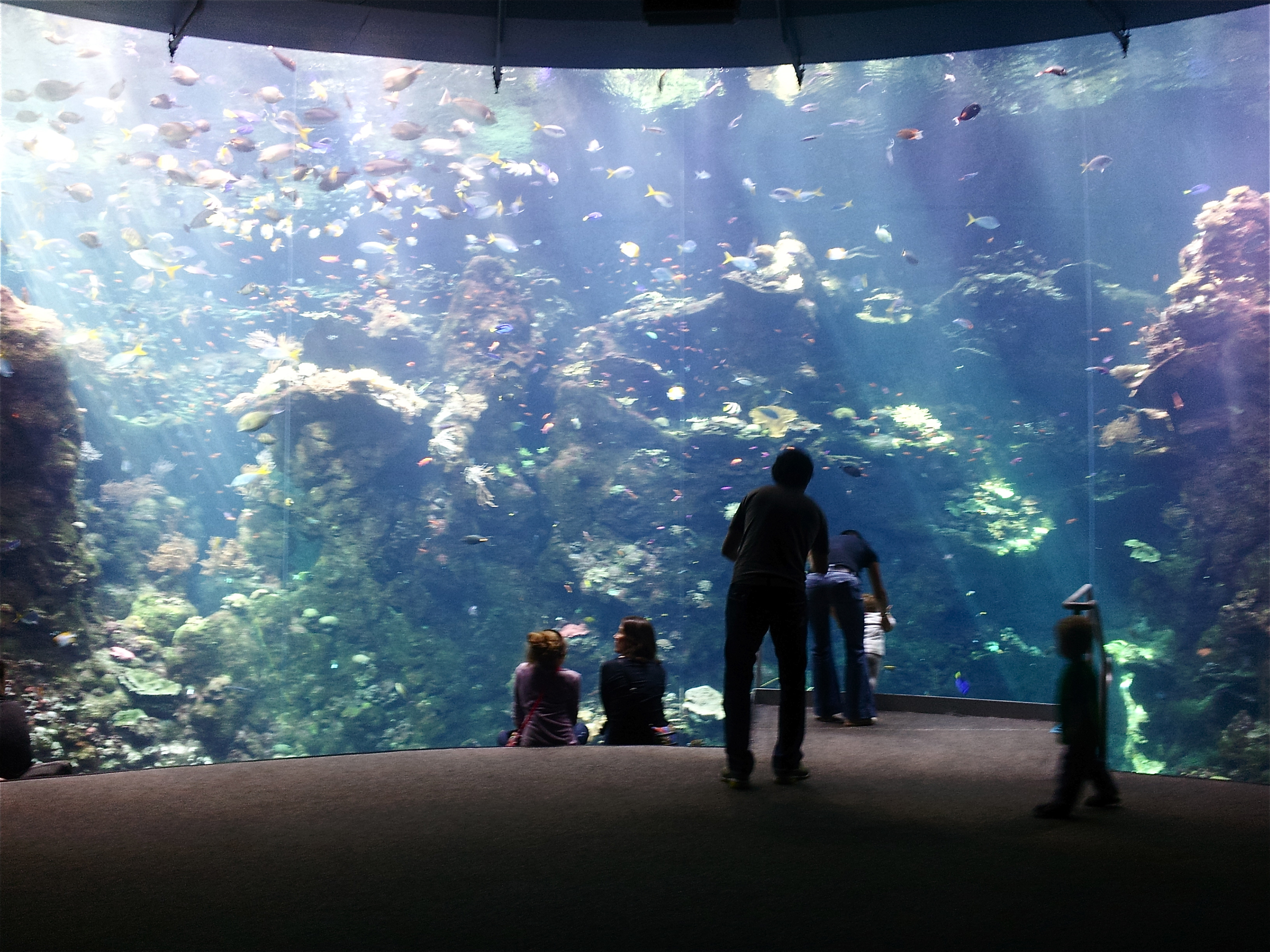
Philippine coral reef tank

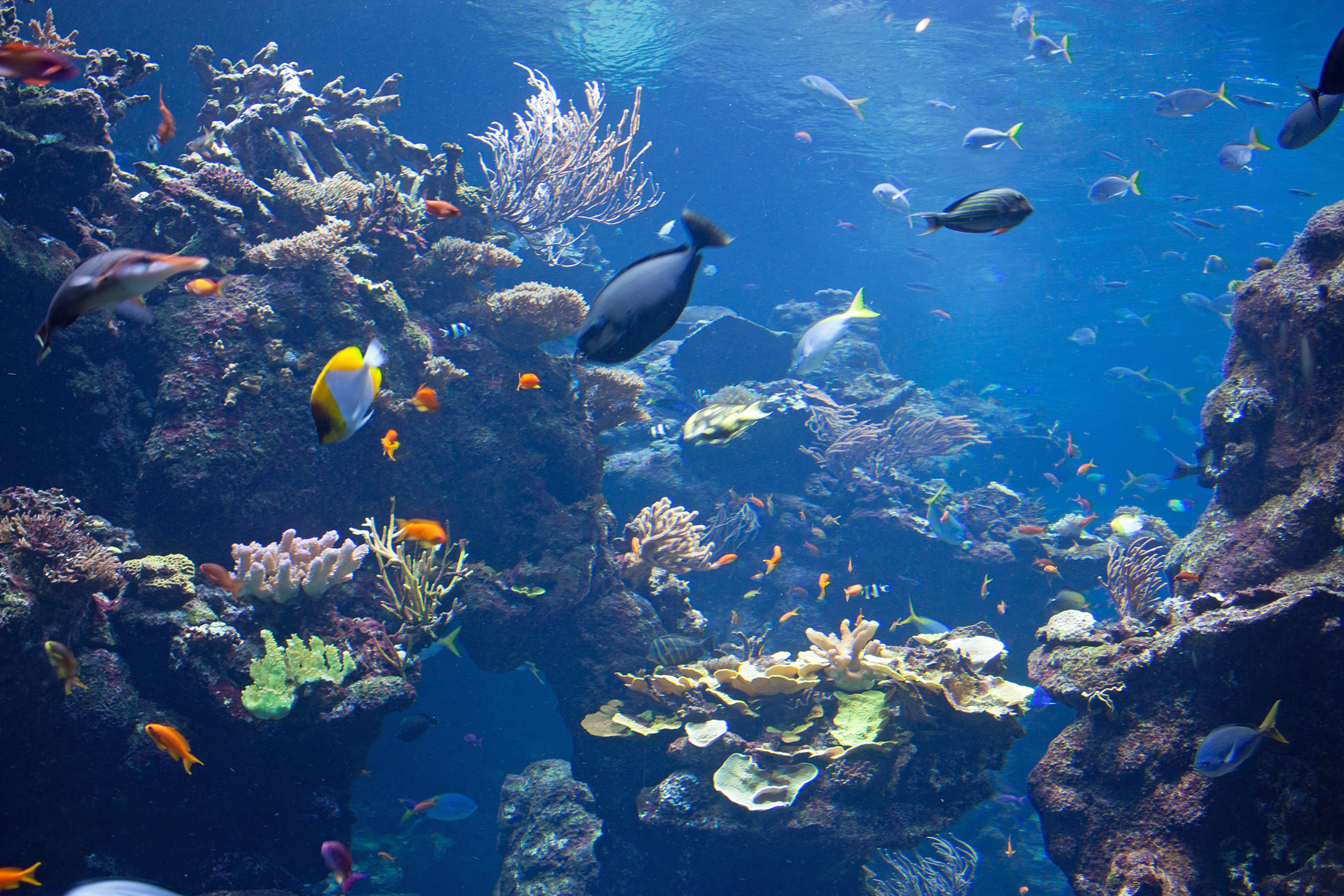
Part of the Philippine coral reef

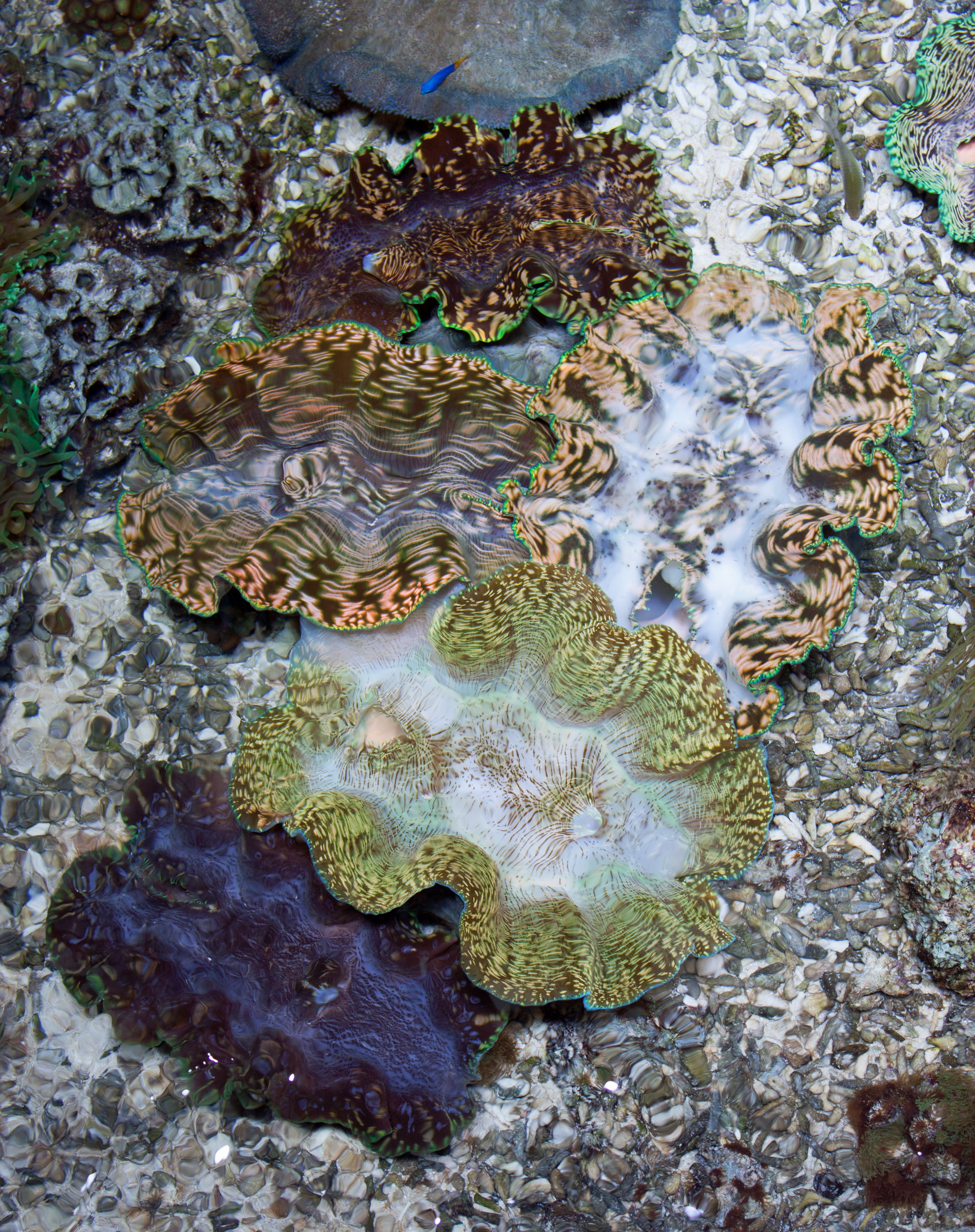
Giant clams in reef shallows

== See also ==
- 49-Mile Scenic Drive
- Green museum
