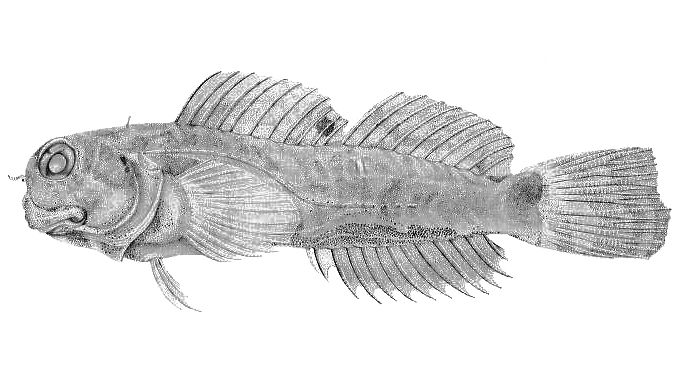

Conservation status
- Least Concern (IUCN 3.1)

Scientific classification
- Kingdom: Animalia
- Phylum: Chordata
- Class: Actinopterygii
- Order: Blenniiformes
- Family: Blenniidae
- Genus: Stanulus
- Species: S. seychellensis

Binomial name
- Stanulus seychellensis J. L. B. Smith, 1959

Synonyms
- Fallacirripectes minutus L. P. Schultz & W. M. Chapman, 1960

= Stanulus seychellensis =

Species of fish

Stanulus seychellensis, the Seychelle's blenny, is a species of combtooth blenny found in coral reefs in the Pacific and Indian oceans. It feeds primarily on plants, including benthic algae and weeds. It can reach a length of 4 centimetres (1.6 in) TL. This fish is also found in the aquarium trade.
