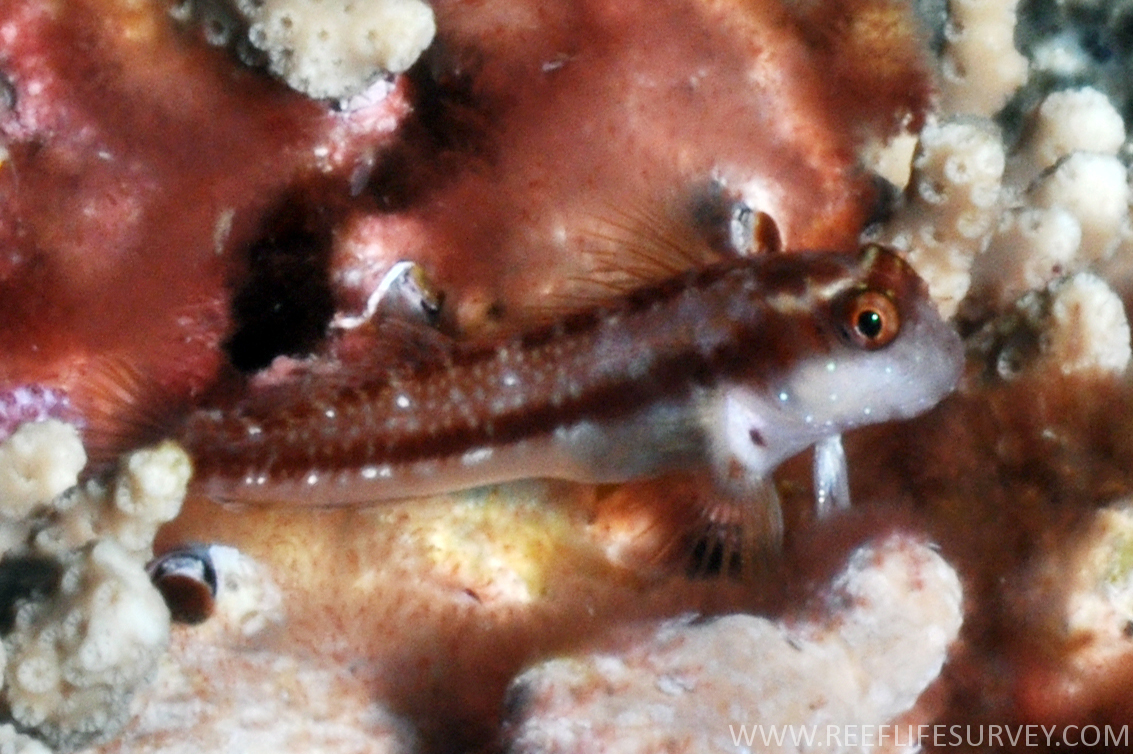

Conservation status
- Least Concern (IUCN 3.1)

Scientific classification
- Kingdom: Animalia
- Phylum: Chordata
- Class: Actinopterygii
- Order: Blenniiformes
- Family: Blenniidae
- Genus: Stanulus
- Species: S. talboti

Binomial name
- Stanulus talboti V. G. Springer, 1968

= Stanulus talboti =

Species of fish

Stanulus talboti, Talbot's blenny, is a species of combtooth blenny found in coral reefs in the western Pacific Ocean. This species feeds primarily on plants, including benthic algae and weeds. This species can reach 4.8 cm (1.9 in) in TL. This fish is also found in the aquarium trade.

== Description ==
A small fish, with maximum recorded size of about 4.8 cm. Small unbranched supraorbital, nasal and nuchal cirri. Lip margins smooth. Deep notch in dorsal fin between spiny and rayed sections, dorsal fin attached to base of caudal peduncle by a membrane, anal fin free. There is a stripe of dark brown spots along the body. Above this stripe the back is brown with whitish spots, and the belly is whitish. The underside of the head has small white spots, and there is a dark brown spot at the base of the pectoral fin.

== Distribution ==
Recorded from Western Australia, the southern part of the Great Barrier Reef, Lord Howe Island, the Ryukyu Islands and the Ogasawara Islands, east into the Pacific as far as Tonga. The type locality is One Tree Island in the Capricorn Group on the Great Barrier Reef.

== Habitat ==
Usually seen in the surge channels of exposed reefs at depths from 3 to 15m.

== Name ==
The specific name honours Frank Talbot, who organised the expedition on which the type was collected and who helped collect it, when he was working for the South African Museum some years earlier.
