= Striped blenny =

Striped blenny is a common name for several fishes and may refer to:

- Aspidontus taeniatus, native to the western Pacific and eastern Indian Oceans
- Chasmodes bosquianus, native to the northwestern Atlantic Ocean
- Ecsenius lineatus, native to the Indian and southwestern Pacific Oceans
- Meiacanthus grammistes, native to the southwestern Pacific Ocean
- Plagiotremus goslinei, native to Hawaii and eastern central Pacific Ocean
