= Sabretooth =

Sabretooth or sabertooth may refer to:

== Animals ==
- Saber-toothed cat, several prehistoric felines
  - Smilodon, a prehistoric genus of cat
- Sabertooth fish, a deep-sea fish found in the tropics
  - Sabre-toothed blenny, Aspidontus taeniatus, a variety of fish that lives deep underwater in the benthic zone
  - Sabertooth blenny, Plagiotremus azaleus, a species of combtooth blenny in coral reefs in the eastern Pacific Ocean
  - Sabertooth salmon, Oncorhynchus rastrosus, an ancient species of salmon
  - Sabretooth tetra, the Payara, Hydrolycus scomberoides, a species of gamefish in the Orinoco River in Venezuela and in the Amazon basin
- Saber-toothed predator, several distantly related lineages of synapsids
  - Thylacosmilus, a genus of sabre-toothed metatherian predators from the Miocene period
  - Gorgonopsia, an extinct group of sabre-tooth therapsids from the Middle and Late Permian

== Sports ==
- Sabretooth (mascot), the mascot for the Buffalo Sabres National Hockey League team

== Fiction ==
- Sabretooth (character), a Marvel Comics supervillain
- Sabretooth (film), a 2002 made-for-TV movie
- Sabre-Tooth, a 1966 book by Peter O'Donnell featuring the character Modesty Blaise
- Captain Sabertooth, a series of stage plays, theatrical films, and a television series by the Norwegian singer and actor Terje Formoe

== Other uses ==
- SABERTOOTH, a protein sequence and structure alignment algorithm
- Sabertooth Games, a now defunct Memphis, Tennessee based game company, founded in 2001

== See also ==
- Sabercat (disambiguation)
