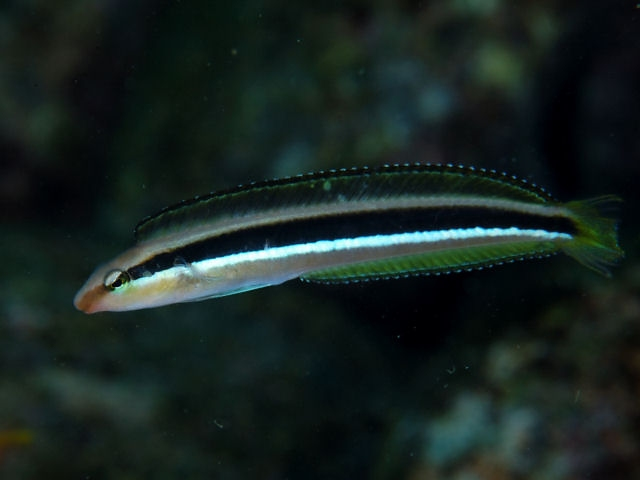

Conservation status
- Least Concern (IUCN 3.1)

Scientific classification
- Kingdom: Animalia
- Phylum: Chordata
- Class: Actinopterygii
- Division: Teleostei
- Order: Blenniiformes
- Family: Blenniidae
- Genus: Aspidontus
- Species: A. dussumieri

Binomial name
- Aspidontus dussumieri (Valenciennes, 1836)

Synonyms
- Blennechis dussumieri Valenciennes, 1836; Petroscrites striatus Day, 1888; Petroscirtes fluctuans Weber, 1909; Petroscirtes gorrorensis Herre, 1936; Petroscirtes quadrimaculatus Kendall & Goldsborough, 1911; Aspidontus (Escadotus) wamiziensis J. L. B. Smith, 1959

= Aspidontus dussumieri =

Species of fish

Aspidontus dussumieri, the lance blenny, Dussumier's blenny or slender sabretooth blenny, is a species of marine ray-finned fish belonging to the family Blenniidae, the combtooth blennies. This blenny has a wide Indo-Pacific distribution.

In Kenya

== Taxonomy ==
Aspidontus dussumieri was first formally described as Blennechis dussumieri by the French zoologist Achille Valenciennes with its type locality given as Réunion. This species is now classified in the genus Aspidontus which was described in 1834 by Georges Cuvier as a monospecific genus with Aspidontus taeniatus as its type species by monotypy. A. dussumieri is the only other species in the genus.This genus is classified in the subfamily Blenniinae, of the combtooth blenny family Blenniidae.

== Etymology ==
Aspidontus dussumieri is a member of the genus Aspidontus, this name is a combination of aspis, a "viper", and odon, meaning "tooth", a reference to the canine-like teeth on the dentary of A. taeniatus which Cuvier described as “surmounted by two long crooked hooks like those of serpents, hiding in the bones of the skull”. The specific name, dussumieri, honours the French explorer and merchant Jean-Jacques Dussumier, the collector of the type.

== Description ==
Aspidontus dussumieri has an elongated body which reaches a total length of 12 cm (4.7 in). The dorsal fin is supported by between 9 and 11 spines and 28 to 35 soft rays while the anal fin contains2 spines and between 25 and 30 soft rays. This species has a slender body and a single dark stripe along its sides which runs from the tip of the snout to the caudal fin with an ocellus sometimes present in from of the dorsal fin and dome Indonesian populations possessing elongated yellow filaments on the caudal fin.

== Distribution and habitat ==
Aspidontus dussumieri has a wide Indo-Pacific distribution from East Africa and the Red Sea to east to the Tuamotus, including many Pacific islands such as Nauru, south to Australia and north to Japan. This species is found on coral and rocky reefs, it is a typically shy species that readily retreats to hiding places, normally vacated tube-worm homes, reversing into them.
