= Enchelyurus petersi =

Conservation status
- Least Concern (IUCN 3.1)

Scientific classification
- Kingdom: Animalia
- Phylum: Chordata
- Class: Actinopterygii
- Order: Blenniiformes
- Family: Blenniidae
- Genus: Enchelyurus
- Species: E. petersi

Binomial name
- Enchelyurus petersi (Kossmann & Räuber, 1877)

Synonyms
- Petroscirtes petersi Kossmann & Räuber, 1877

Species of fish

Enchelyurus petersi is a species of combtooth blenny found in the western Indian Ocean, in the Red Sea. This species grows to a length of 5.4 centimetres (2.1 in) SL. The specific name honours the German naturalist and explorer Wilhelm Peters (1815-1883) who named the genus Enchelyurus for the similar species E. flavipes in 1868.
