= Adelotremus leptus =

Conservation status
- Data Deficient (IUCN 3.1)

Scientific classification
- Kingdom: Animalia
- Phylum: Chordata
- Class: Actinopterygii
- Order: Blenniiformes
- Family: Blenniidae
- Genus: Adelotremus
- Species: A. leptus

Binomial name
- Adelotremus leptus Smith-Vaniz & Rose, 2012

Species of fish

Adelotremus leptus is a species of combtooth blenny native to the Red Sea where it is only known from Marsa el At, Egypt. It was caught at a depth of 15 metres (49 ft). It has a slender body. The first specimen, a female, measured 3.54 centimetres (1.39 in) SL, and others have been recorded since. Until 2017 this species was considered to be the only species in the monotypic genus Adelotremus. In 2017 a second species, Adelotremus deloachi was described from Indonesia.
