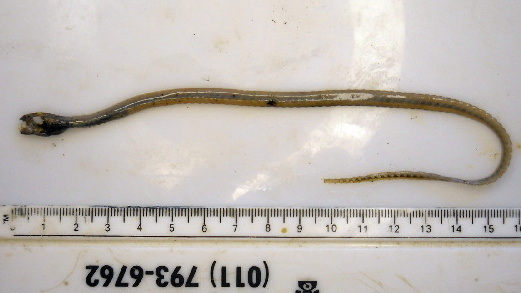

Conservation status
- Least Concern (IUCN 3.1)

Scientific classification
- Kingdom: Animalia
- Phylum: Chordata
- Class: Actinopterygii
- Order: Blenniiformes
- Family: Blenniidae
- Genus: Xiphasia
- Species: X. matsubarai

Binomial name
- Xiphasia matsubarai Okada & K. Suzuki, 1952

= Xiphasia matsubarai =

Species of fish

Xiphasia matsubarai, the Japanese snake blenny, is a species of combtooth blenny found in the western Pacific and Indian oceans just extending into the Atlantic Ocean in False Bay, South Africa. This species can be found at depths ranging from the surface to 4,960 m (16,270 ft). This species reaches 30 cm (12 in) in SL. This species feeds primarily on bony fish, rising to the surface at night to feed. It can also be found in the aquarium trade.

== Description ==
Xiphasia matsubarai has an elongated body that resembles an eel, and has a dorsal fin that covers the whole length of the body. They have gray-brown stripes that cover the length of their bodies starting at the head. The head is small and it is rounded anteriorly. The eyes are slightly smaller and located near the lateral sides of the head. It does not have any scales. They have a single row of incisor teeth and large canines. The bottom canines are significantly longer than the canines in the upper jaw. The article identified distinct morphological characteristics and sequence analysis that helped identify X. matsubarai. Smith-Vanzi and Shen made important comparisons between the X. matsubarai and the X. setifer, which included fin length and color. This supported the initial discovery of the snake blenny.

== Name ==
The specific name honours the Japanese ichthyologist Kiyomatsu Matsubara (1907-1968) of Kyoto University who was a colleague of the two authors and who named this species in his honour in gratitude for the kindness he had shown them.
