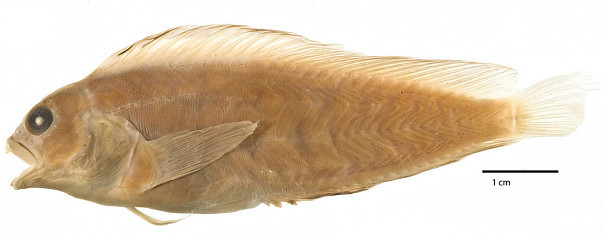

Conservation status
- Least Concern (IUCN 3.1)

Scientific classification
- Kingdom: Animalia
- Phylum: Chordata
- Class: Actinopterygii
- Order: Blenniiformes
- Family: Blenniidae
- Genus: Chasmodes
- Species: C. saburrae

Binomial name
- Chasmodes saburrae D. S. Jordan & C. H. Gilbert, 1882

= Chasmodes saburrae =

Species of fish

Chasmodes saburrae, the Florida blenny, is a species of combtooth blenny found in the western central Atlantic Ocean, around the coast of the United States.

== Description ==
The Florida blenny is a small fish growing to a maximum length of 10 cm (4 in) but a more typical length is 6 cm (2.4 in). The single, continuous dorsal fin has about six spines and nineteen soft rays. The anal fin has eighteen or nineteen rays. The colour of this fish is a mottled or speckled brown. The sexes differ in that the female has the first anal spine reduced in size. In the breeding season, territorial males have enlarged anal spines with associated fleshy lobes and longitudinal folds of skin. These males also grow larger than the females, have pale longitudinal markings, an iridescent blue spot at the front of the dorsal fin, an orange streak running backwards from the blue spot and orange colouring on the gills and throat.

== Distribution and habitat ==
This blenny is native to waters less than 6 m (20 ft) deep in the southeastern United States and the northeastern Gulf of Mexico. Its range extends from New Smyrna Beach, Florida around the coast to the Chandeleur Islands of Louisiana; the range includes the Indian River Lagoon, the Florida Keys and the Mississippi Delta. It is a demersal fish and often found around mangroves and over rocky reefs.

== Ecology ==
The Florida blenny is an omnivore but the diet varies with size. Although all sizes of fish feed on copepods, the smaller fish mostly feed on prey found in mid water. Larger fish often feed on or near the seabed, with detritus and plant material being added to their diet, as well as polychaete worms, molluscs, shrimps, other crustaceans and fish eggs. The Florida blenny is probably eaten by other fish and by large invertebrates.

This blenny is not a shoaling fish and the male is territorial during the breeding season, which lasts from about March to October. A male will mate with several females and all these will deposit their eggs in the same location. Places chosen for this include the empty shells of the eastern oyster (Crassostrea virginica) and rigid pen shell (Atrina rigida), rock crevices, sponges or discarded cans; in one case, 11,000 eggs were found in a single can. The male guards the eggs for the three weeks or so before they hatch, while the females produce further batches of eggs at intervals during the breeding season. The larvae are pelagic and feed on zooplankton, before settling to the seabed after about three weeks when they are 6 mm (0.24 in) long.
