= Plagiotremus spilistius =

Conservation status
- Least Concern (IUCN 3.1)

Scientific classification
- Kingdom: Animalia
- Phylum: Chordata
- Class: Actinopterygii
- Order: Blenniiformes
- Family: Blenniidae
- Genus: Plagiotremus
- Species: P. spilistius

Binomial name
- Plagiotremus spilistius T. N. Gill, 1865

Species of fish

Plagiotremus spilistius is a species of combtooth blenny found in the eastern Pacific ocean. This species reaches a length of 6 centimetres (2.4 in) SL. It is the type species of the genus Plagiotremus.
