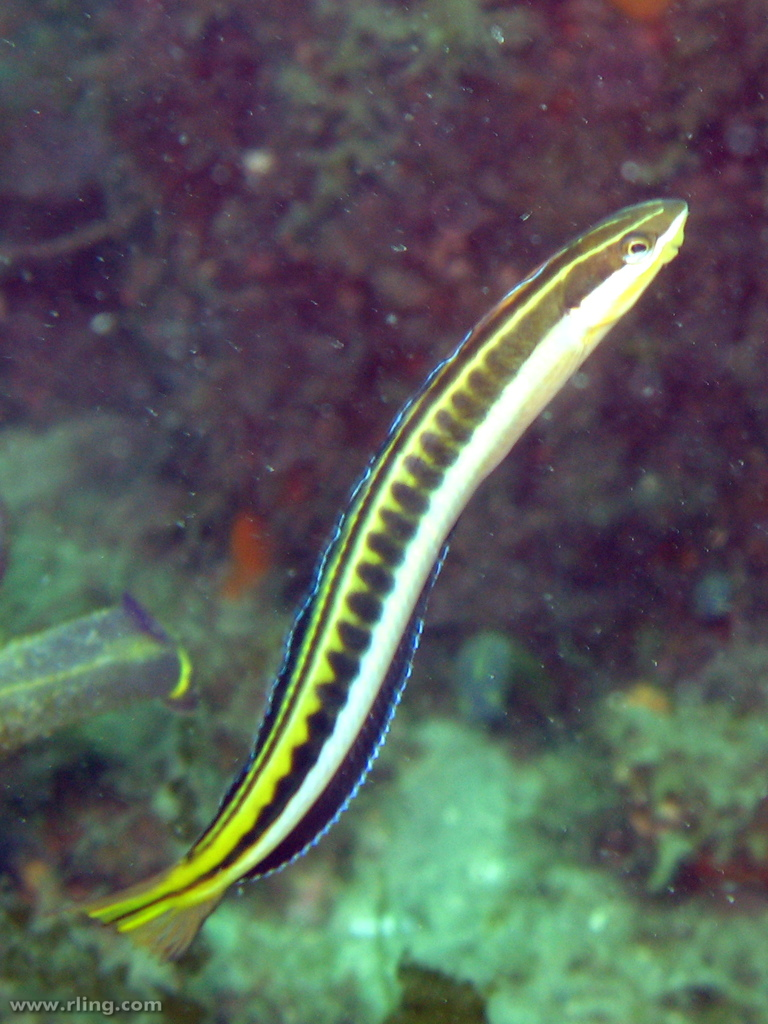

Conservation status
- Least Concern (IUCN 3.1)

Scientific classification
- Kingdom: Animalia
- Phylum: Chordata
- Class: Actinopterygii
- Order: Blenniiformes
- Family: Blenniidae
- Genus: Plagiotremus
- Species: P. tapeinosoma

Binomial name
- Plagiotremus tapeinosoma (Bleeker, 1857)

Synonyms
- Aspidontus tapeinosoma (Bleeker, 1857); Petroscirtes tapeinosoma Bleeker, 1857; Runula tapeinosoma (Bleeker, 1857)

= Mimic blenny =

Species of fish

The mimic blenny or piano fangblenny, Plagiotremus tapeinosoma, is a blenny of the genus Plagiotremus, with a widespread Indo-Pacific distribution including New Zealand from depths of 8 to 30 metres (26 to 98 ft). This species reaches a length of 14 centimetres (5.5 in) TL.
