= Chasmodes longimaxilla =

Stretchjaw blenny

Conservation status
- Least Concern (IUCN 3.1)

Scientific classification
- Kingdom: Animalia
- Phylum: Chordata
- Class: Actinopterygii
- Order: Blenniiformes
- Family: Blenniidae
- Genus: Chasmodes
- Species: C. longimaxilla

Binomial name
- Chasmodes longimaxilla J. T. Williams, 1983

Synonyms
- Chasmodes bosquianus longimaxilla Williams, 1983

Species of fish

Chasmodes longimaxilla, the stretchjaw blenny or longjaw blenny, is a species of combtooth blenny found in the western central Atlantic ocean.
