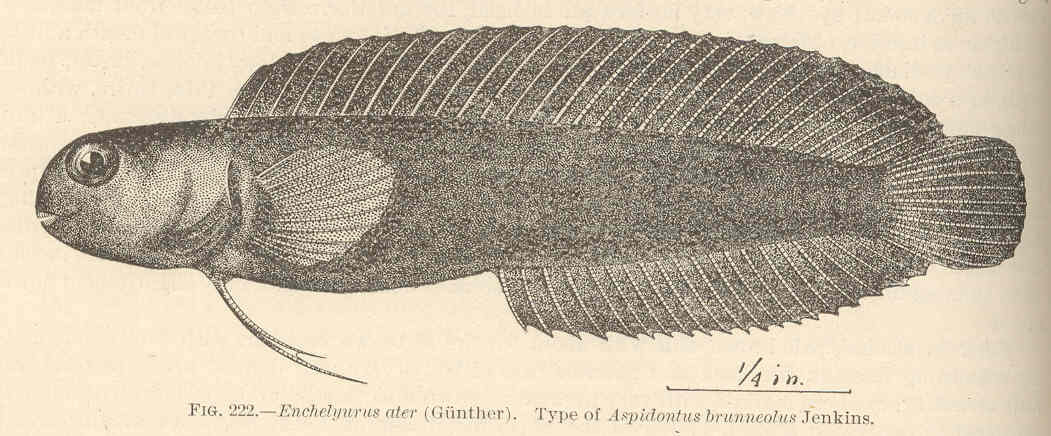
- Euchelyurus ater

Scientific classification
- Domain: Eukaryota
- Kingdom: Animalia
- Phylum: Chordata
- Class: Actinopterygii
- Order: Blenniiformes
- Family: Blenniidae
- Subfamily: Blenniinae
- Genus: Enchelyurus; W. K. H. Peters, 1868

Type species
- Enchelyurus flavipes Peters, 1868

= Enchelyurus =

Genus of fishes

Enchelyurus is a genus of combtooth blennies found in the Pacific and Indian Oceans.

== Species ==
There are currently five recognized species in this genus:

- Enchelyurus ater (Günther, 1877) (Black blenny)
- Enchelyurus brunneolus (O. P. Jenkins, 1903)
- Enchelyurus flavipes W. K. H. Peters, 1868
- Enchelyurus kraussii (Klunzinger, 1871) (Krauss' blenny)
- Enchelyurus petersi (Kossmann & Räuber, 1877)
