= Oman ypsilon =

Conservation status
- Vulnerable (IUCN 3.1)

Scientific classification
- Kingdom: Animalia
- Phylum: Chordata
- Class: Actinopterygii
- Order: Blenniiformes
- Family: Blenniidae
- Subfamily: Blenniinae
- Genus: Oman; V. G. Springer, 1985
- Species: O. ypsilon

Binomial name
- Oman ypsilon V. G. Springer, 1985

Species of fish

Oman ypsilon, the Oman blenny, is a species of combtooth blenny found in the western Indian Ocean, around Oman. This fish reaches a length of 4 centimetres (1.6 in) TL. It is the only known species in the genus Oman.
