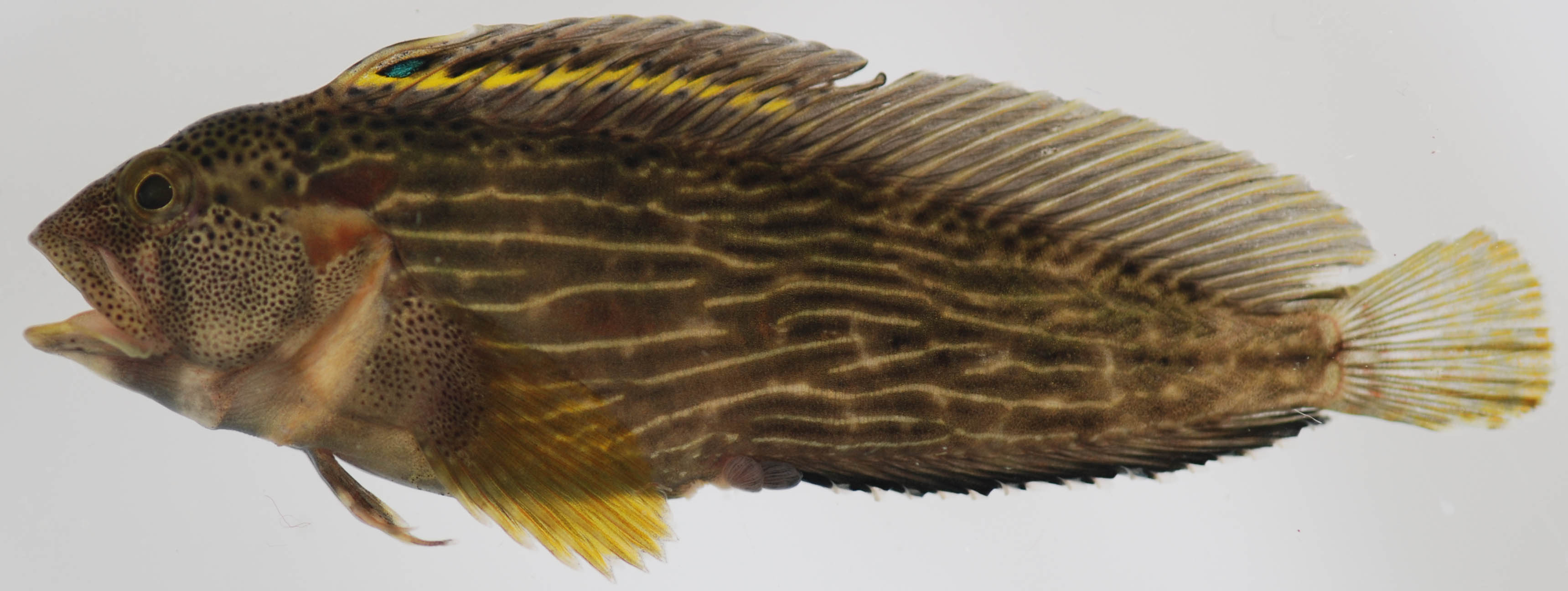
- Striped Blenny (C. bosquianus)

Scientific classification
- Kingdom: Animalia
- Phylum: Chordata
- Class: Actinopterygii
- Division: Teleostei
- Order: Blenniiformes
- Family: Blenniidae
- Subfamily: Salariinae
- Genus: Chasmodes; Valenciennes, 1836

Type species
- Blennius bosquianus Lacépède, 1800

= Chasmodes =

Genus of fishes

Chasmodes is a small genus of combtooth blennies found in the western Atlantic Ocean.

== Species ==
There are currently three recognized species in this genus:

- Chasmodes bosquianus (Lacépède, 1800) (Striped blenny)
- Chasmodes longimaxilla J. T. Williams, 1983 (Stretchjaw blenny)
- Chasmodes saburrae D. S. Jordan & C. H. Gilbert, 1882 (Florida blenny)
