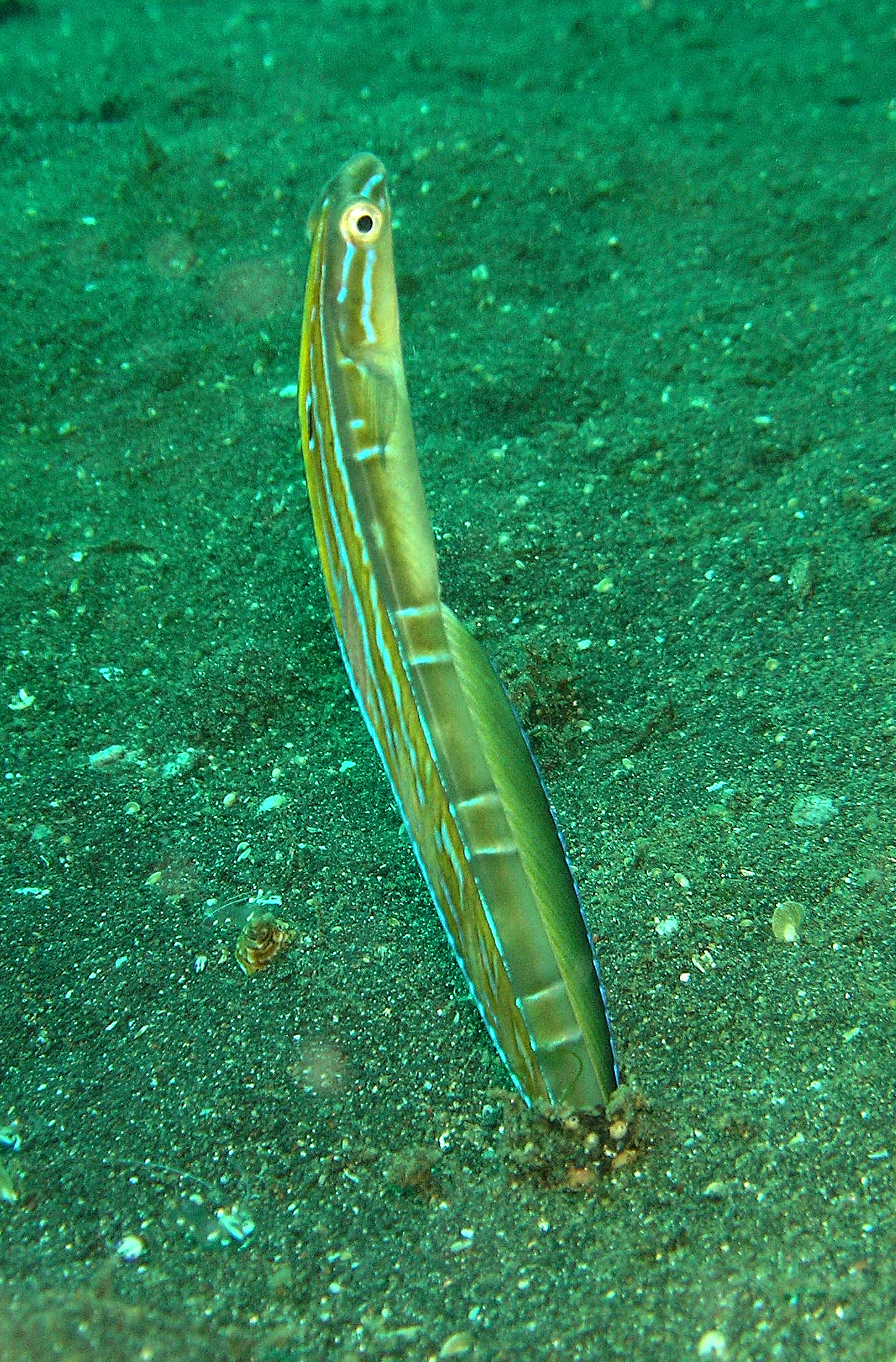
- Hairtail Blenny (X. setifer)

Scientific classification
- Kingdom: Animalia
- Phylum: Chordata
- Class: Actinopterygii
- Order: Blenniiformes
- Family: Blenniidae
- Subfamily: Blenniinae
- Genus: Xiphasia; Swainson, 1839

Type species
- Xiphasia setifer Swainson, 1839

= Xiphasia =

Genus of fishes

Xiphasia is a small genus of combtooth blennies found in the Pacific and Indian Oceans.

== Species ==
The currently recognized species in this genus are:

- Xiphasia matsubarai Okada & K. Suzuki, 1952 (Japanese snake blenny)
- Xiphasia setifer Swainson, 1839 (hairtail blenny)
