= Phenablennius heyligeri =

Conservation status
- Data Deficient (IUCN 3.1)

Scientific classification
- Kingdom: Animalia
- Phylum: Chordata
- Class: Actinopterygii
- Order: Blenniiformes
- Family: Blenniidae
- Subfamily: Blenniinae
- Genus: Phenablennius; V. G. Springer & Smith-Vaniz, 1972
- Species: P. heyligeri

Binomial name
- Phenablennius heyligeri (Bleeker, 1859)

Species of fish

Phenablennius heyligeri is a species of combtooth blenny found in the western central Pacific ocean around Sumatra, Borneo and off the coast of Cambodia. This species reaches a length of 5.3 centimetres (2.1 in) SL. This species is currently the only known member of its genus. The specific name honours the person who collected the type, R.V. Heyliger, who was the Belgian consul in Batavia.
