= Spaniblennius riodourensis =

Conservation status
- Data Deficient (IUCN 3.1)

Scientific classification
- Kingdom: Animalia
- Phylum: Chordata
- Class: Actinopterygii
- Order: Blenniiformes
- Family: Blenniidae
- Genus: Spaniblennius
- Species: S. riodourensis

Binomial name
- Spaniblennius riodourensis (Metzelaar, 1919)

Synonyms
- Blennius riodourensis Metzelaar, 1919

Species of fish

Spaniblennius riodourensis is a species of combtooth blenny found in the eastern Atlantic Ocean, from Mauritania to Morocco. This species reaches 5.1 cm (2.0 in) in SL.
