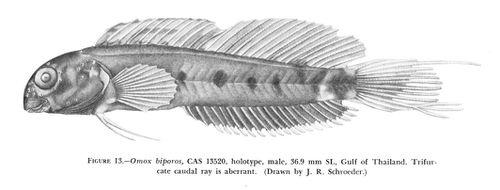
- O. biporos

Scientific classification
- Domain: Eukaryota
- Kingdom: Animalia
- Phylum: Chordata
- Class: Actinopterygii
- Order: Blenniiformes
- Family: Blenniidae
- Subfamily: Blenniinae
- Genus: Omox; V. G. Springer, 1972

Type species
- Omox biporos Springer, 1972

Species
- See text.

= Omox =

Genus of fishes

Omox is a small genus of combtooth blennies found in the western Pacific Ocean.

== Species ==
There are currently two recognized species in this genus:

- Omox biporos V. G. Springer, 1972 (Omox blenny)
- Omox lupus V. G. Springer, 1981 (Wolf blenny)
