= Laiphognathus longispinis =

Conservation status
- Least Concern (IUCN 3.1)

Scientific classification
- Kingdom: Animalia
- Phylum: Chordata
- Class: Actinopterygii
- Order: Blenniiformes
- Family: Blenniidae
- Genus: Laiphognathus
- Species: L. longispinis

Binomial name
- Laiphognathus longispinis Murase, 2007

Species of fish

Laiphognathus longispinis, the crown spotty blenny, is a species of combtooth blenny found in the northwest Pacific ocean. It can reach a maximum length of 5.1 centimetres (2.0 in) SL.
