= Adelotremus =

Scientific classification
- Domain: Eukaryota
- Kingdom: Animalia
- Phylum: Chordata
- Class: Actinopterygii
- Order: Blenniiformes
- Family: Blenniidae
- Subfamily: Blenniinae
- Genus: Adelotremus; Smith-Vaniz & Rose, 2012

Type species
- Adelotremus leptus Smith-Vaniz & Rose, 2012

Genus of fishes

Adelotremus is a small genus of combtooth blennies which are found in the Indo-Pacific region. The name of the genus is a compound of the Greek Adelos meaning "concealed" and trema meaning "hole", this was coined to reflect that the type of Adelotremus leptus was discovered hiding in a tube made by a polychaete.

== Species ==
There are currently two species recognised in the genus Adelotremus:

- Adelotremus deloachi Smith-Vaniz, 2017 Spotfin fangblenny
- Adelotremus leptus Smith-Vaniz & Rose, 2012
