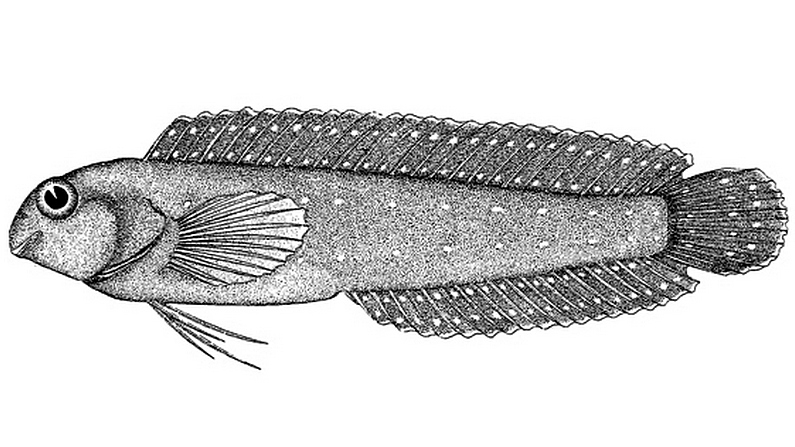
- Illustration of Hepburn's Blenny, Parenchelyurus hepburni

Scientific classification
- Kingdom: Animalia
- Phylum: Chordata
- Class: Actinopterygii
- Order: Blenniiformes
- Family: Blenniidae
- Subfamily: Blenniinae
- Genus: Parenchelyurus; V. G. Springer, 1972

Type species
- Enchelyurus hepburni Snyder, 1908

Species
- See text.

= Parenchelyurus =

Genus of fishes

Parenchelyurus is a genus of combtooth blennies found in the Pacific, and Indian oceans.

== Species ==
There are currently two recognized species in this genus:

- Parenchelyurus hepburni (Snyder, 1908) (Hepburn's blenny)
- Parenchelyurus hyena (Whitley, 1953)
