= Omox lupus =

Conservation status
- Least Concern (IUCN 3.1)

Scientific classification
- Kingdom: Animalia
- Phylum: Chordata
- Class: Actinopterygii
- Order: Blenniiformes
- Family: Blenniidae
- Genus: Omox
- Species: O. lupus

Binomial name
- Omox lupus V. G. Springer, 1981

Species of fish

Omox lupus, the wolf blenny, is a species of combtooth blenny found in coral reefs in the western central Pacific Ocean, around Papua New Guinea.
