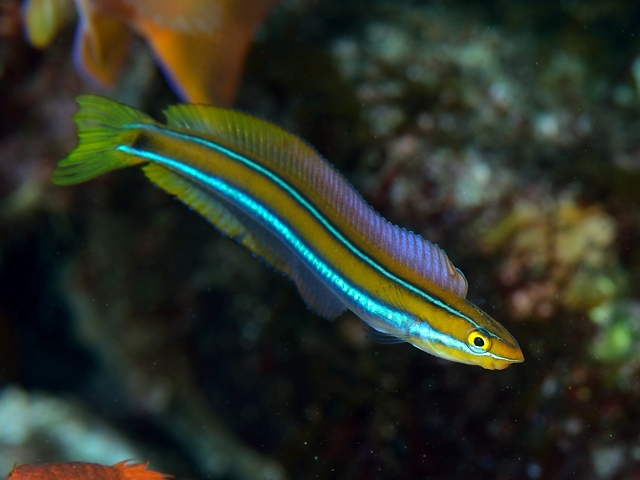
- Plagiotremus rhinorhynchos

Scientific classification
- Kingdom: Animalia
- Phylum: Chordata
- Class: Actinopterygii
- Division: Teleostei
- Order: Blenniiformes
- Family: Blenniidae
- Subfamily: Blenniinae
- Genus: Plagiotremus; T. N. Gill, 1865

Type species
- Plagiotremus spilistius T .N. Gill, 1865

Synonyms
- Atopoclinus Vaillant, 1894; Lembeichthys Herre, 1936; Macrurrhynchus Ogilby, 1896; Musgravius Whitley, 1961; Runula Jordan & Bollman, 1890

= Plagiotremus =

Genus of fishes

Plagiotremus is a genus of combtooth blennies found throughout the Pacific and Indian oceans.

== Species ==
There are currently 11 recognized species in this genus:

Species	Common name	Image
Plagiotremus azaleus (D. S. Jordan & Bollman, 1890)	Sabertooth blenny	
Plagiotremus ewaensis (Brock, 1948)	Ewa fangblenny	
Plagiotremus goslinei (Strasburg, 1956)	Gosline's fangblenny	
Plagiotremus iosodon Smith-Vaniz, 1976		
Plagiotremus laudandus (Whitley, 1961)	Bicolour fangblenny	
Plagiotremus phenax Smith-Vaniz, 1976	Imposter fangblenny	
Plagiotremus rhinorhynchos (Bleeker, 1852)	Bluestriped fangblenny	
Plagiotremus spilistius T. N. Gill, 1865		
Plagiotremus tapeinosoma (Bleeker, 1857)	Piano fangblenny	
Plagiotremus townsendi (Regan, 1905)	Townsend's fangblenny	
