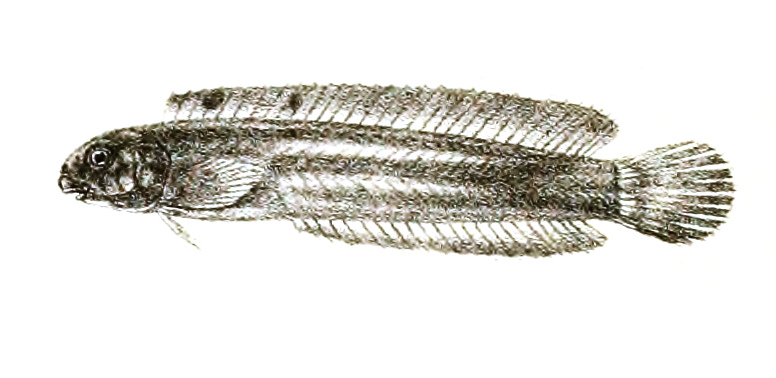

Conservation status
- Data Deficient (IUCN 3.1)

Scientific classification
- Kingdom: Animalia
- Phylum: Chordata
- Class: Actinopterygii
- Order: Blenniiformes
- Family: Blenniidae
- Subfamily: Blenniinae
- Genus: Haptogenys; V. G. Springer, 1972
- Species: H. bipunctata

Binomial name
- Haptogenys bipunctata (F. Day, 1876)

Synonyms
- Petroscirtes bipunctatus Day, 1876; Haptogenys quadripora Springer, 1972

= Haptogenys =

Genus of fishes

Haptogenys bipunctata is a species of combtooth blenny found in the western Pacific and Indian Oceans. It is the only known member of its genus.
