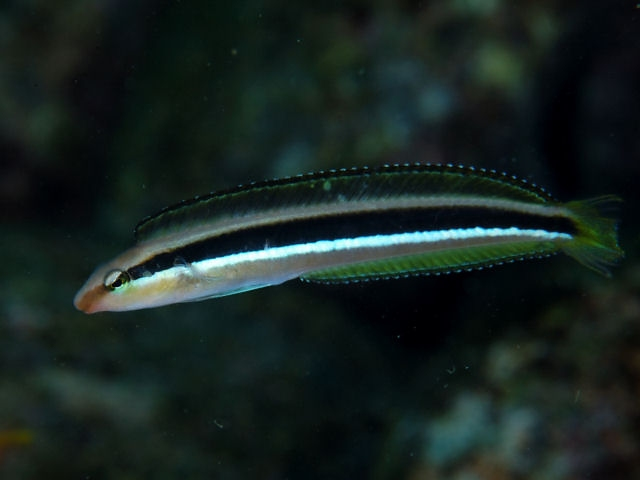
- Aspidontus dussumieri

Scientific classification
- Kingdom: Animalia
- Phylum: Chordata
- Class: Actinopterygii
- Division: Teleostei
- Order: Blenniiformes
- Family: Blenniidae
- Subfamily: Blenniinae
- Genus: Aspidontus; G. Cuvier, 1834

Type species
- Aspidontus taeniatus Quoy & Gaimard, 1834

= Aspidontus =

- Aspidontus taeniatus

Genus of fishes

Aspidontus is a genus of combtooth blennies found in the Pacific and Indian oceans.

== Species ==
There are currently two recognized species in this genus:

- Aspidontus dussumieri (Valenciennes, 1836) (Lance blenny)
- Aspidontus taeniatus Quoy & Gaimard, 1834 (False cleanerfish)
