= Parenchelyurus hyena =

Conservation status
- Least Concern (IUCN 3.1)

Scientific classification
- Kingdom: Animalia
- Phylum: Chordata
- Class: Actinopterygii
- Order: Blenniiformes
- Family: Blenniidae
- Genus: Parenchelyurus
- Species: P. hyena

Binomial name
- Parenchelyurus hyena (Whitley, 1953)

Synonyms
- Graviceps punctatus hyena Whitley, 1953

Species of fish

Parenchelyurus hyena, the hyena blenny, is a species of combtooth blenny found in the western Pacific ocean, around Papua New Guinea.

== Size ==
This species reaches a length of 3.8 cm (1.5 in).

== Etymology ==
Although the etymology was not explained, it is presumably referring to the Spotted Hyena (Crocuta crocuta), alluding to this blenny's spotted coloration.
