= Laiphognathus =

Scientific classification
- Kingdom: Animalia
- Phylum: Chordata
- Class: Actinopterygii
- Order: Blenniiformes
- Family: Blenniidae
- Subfamily: Blenniinae
- Genus: Laiphognathus; J. L. B. Smith, 1955

Type species
- Laiphognathus multimaculatus Smith, 1955

Genus of fishes

Laiphognathus is a genus of combtooth blennies found in the western Pacific and Indian Oceans.

== Species ==
There are currently two recognized species in this genus:

- Laiphognathus longispinis Murase, 2007 (Crown spotty blenny)
- Laiphognathus multimaculatus J. L. B. Smith, 1955 (Spotty blenny)
