= Spaniblennius =

Scientific classification
- Kingdom: Animalia
- Phylum: Chordata
- Class: Actinopterygii
- Order: Blenniiformes
- Family: Blenniidae
- Subfamily: Blenniinae
- Genus: Spaniblennius; Bath & Wirtz, 1989

Type species
- Blennius riodourensis Metzelaar, 1919

Genus of fishes

Spaniblennius is a genus of combtooth blennies native to the eastern Atlantic Ocean.

== Species ==
The currently recognized species in this genus are:

- Spaniblennius clandestinus Bath & Wirtz, 1989
- Spaniblennius riodourensis (Metzelaar, 1919)
