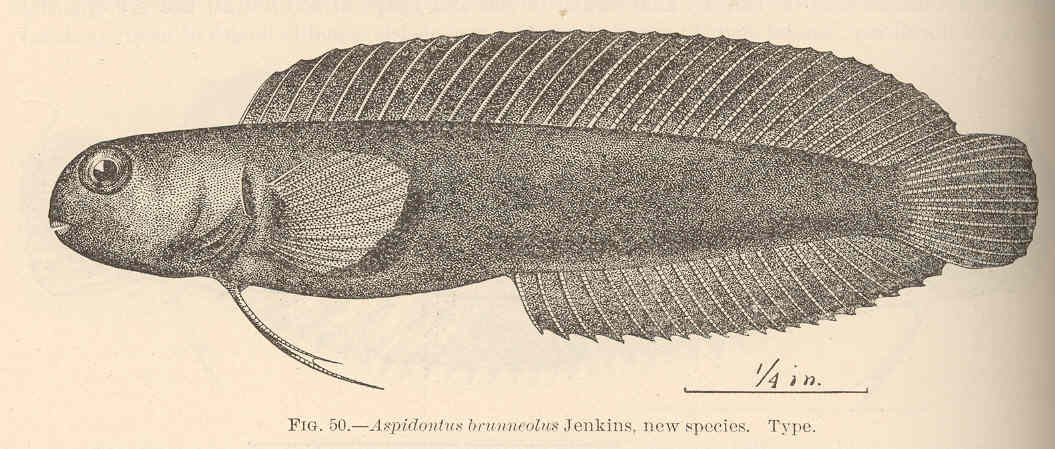

Conservation status
- Least Concern (IUCN 3.1)

Scientific classification
- Kingdom: Animalia
- Phylum: Chordata
- Class: Actinopterygii
- Order: Blenniiformes
- Family: Blenniidae
- Genus: Enchelyurus
- Species: E. brunneolus

Binomial name
- Enchelyurus brunneolus (O. P. Jenkins, 1903)

Synonyms
- Aspidontus brunneolus Jenkins, 1903

= Enchelyurus brunneolus =

Species of fish

Enchelyurus brunneolus is a species of combtooth blenny found in coral reefs in the eastern central Pacific ocean, around Hawaii. This species grows to a length of 2.9 centimetres (1.1 in) SL.
