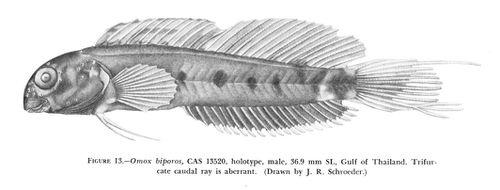

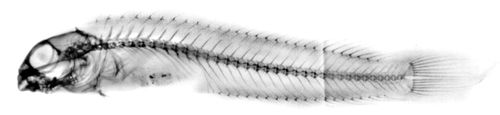

Conservation status
- Least Concern (IUCN 3.1)

Scientific classification
- Kingdom: Animalia
- Phylum: Chordata
- Class: Actinopterygii
- Order: Blenniiformes
- Family: Blenniidae
- Genus: Omox
- Species: O. biporos

Binomial name
- Omox biporos V. G. Springer, 1972

= Omox biporos =

Species of fish

Omox biporos, the omox blenny, is a species of combtooth blenny found in the western Pacific ocean. This species reaches a length of 4.6 centimetres (1.8 in) SL.
