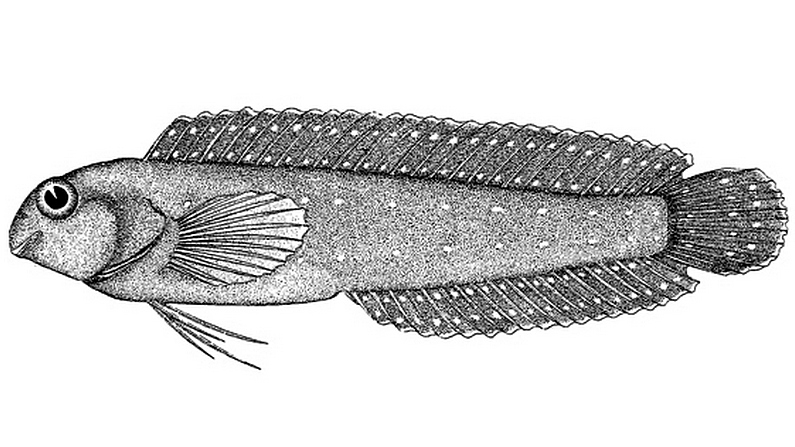

Conservation status
- Least Concern (IUCN 3.1)

Scientific classification
- Kingdom: Animalia
- Phylum: Chordata
- Class: Actinopterygii
- Order: Blenniiformes
- Family: Blenniidae
- Genus: Parenchelyurus
- Species: P. hepburni

Binomial name
- Parenchelyurus hepburni (Snyder, 1908)

Synonyms
- Enchelyurus hepburni Snyder, 1908

= Parenchelyurus hepburni =

Species of fish

Parenchelyurus hepburni, Hepburn's blenny or the bluespotted blenny, is a species of combtooth blenny found in coral reefs in the Pacific and Indian Ocean.

== Size ==
This species reaches a length of 4.5 centimetres (1.8 in) TL.

== Etymology ==
The Specific name (zoology) honours the United States Navy officer Lieutenant A.J. Hepburn who was the executive officer on board the U.S.S. Albatross, a U.S. Bureau of Fisheries steamer and the ship from which the type was collected.

== Gallery ==
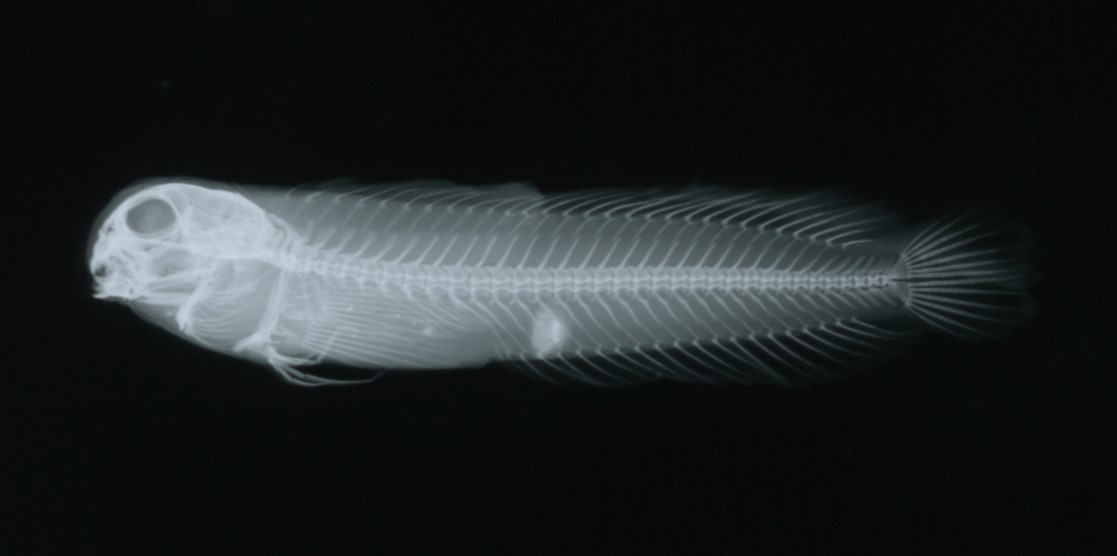
Parenchelyurus hepburni radiograph.
