= Spaniblennius clandestinus =

Conservation status
- Data Deficient (IUCN 3.1)

Scientific classification
- Kingdom: Animalia
- Phylum: Chordata
- Class: Actinopterygii
- Order: Blenniiformes
- Family: Blenniidae
- Genus: Spaniblennius
- Species: S. clandestinus

Binomial name
- Spaniblennius clandestinus Bath & Wirtz, 1989

Species of fish

Spaniblennius clandestinus is a species of combtooth blenny found in the eastern central Atlantic Ocean. It is known from a single specimen, the holotype, which was collected at Goree in Senegal
