= Laiphognathus multimaculatus =

Conservation status
- Least Concern (IUCN 3.1)

Scientific classification
- Kingdom: Animalia
- Phylum: Chordata
- Class: Actinopterygii
- Division: Teleostei
- Order: Blenniiformes
- Family: Blenniidae
- Genus: Laiphognathus
- Species: L. multimaculatus

Binomial name
- Laiphognathus multimaculatus J. L. B. Smith, 1955

Species of fish

Laiphognathus multimaculatus, the spotty blenny, is a species of combtooth blenny found in the western Pacific and Indian Oceans. It can reach a maximum length of 4 centimetres (1.6 in) SL, and is a commercial aquarium fish.
