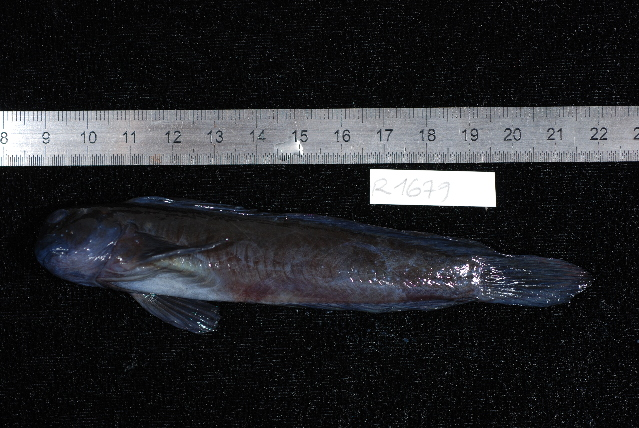

Conservation status
- Least Concern (IUCN 3.1)

Scientific classification
- Kingdom: Animalia
- Phylum: Chordata
- Class: Actinopterygii
- Order: Blenniiformes
- Family: Blenniidae
- Genus: Enchelyurus
- Species: E. kraussii

Binomial name
- Enchelyurus kraussii (Klunzinger, 1871)

Synonyms
- Petroscirtes kraussii Klunzinger, 1871; Enchelyurus kraussi (Klunzinger, 1871)

= Enchelyurus kraussii =

Species of fish

Enchelyurus kraussii, Krauss' blenny, is a species of combtooth blenny found in coral reefs in the western Pacific and Indian Oceans. This species grows to a length of 4.5 centimetres (1.8 in) SL. The specific name honours the German scientist, traveller and collector Christian Ferdinand Friedrich Krauss (1812–1890).
