= Sabercat (disambiguation) =

Sabercat is a common name for a subfamily of extinct saber-toothed predators.

There are several sports teams named Sabercats, SaberCats or Sabrecats, including:

- Houston SaberCats, a Major League Rugby team
- Rayside-Balfour Sabrecats, a former junior league ice hockey team
- San Jose SaberCats, a former Arena Football League team
- Tacoma Sabercats, a former minor league ice hockey team
- Fossil Ridge High School's mascot
- Maranatha Baptist University's athletic team

== See also ==
- Sabretooth (disambiguation)
