= Plagiotremus iosodon =

Conservation status
- Data Deficient (IUCN 3.1)

Scientific classification
- Kingdom: Animalia
- Phylum: Chordata
- Class: Actinopterygii
- Order: Blenniiformes
- Family: Blenniidae
- Genus: Plagiotremus
- Species: P. iosodon

Binomial name
- Plagiotremus iosodon Smith-Vaniz, 1976

Species of fish

Plagiotremus iosodon is a species of combtooth blenny found in the western central Pacific ocean in the Philippines.
