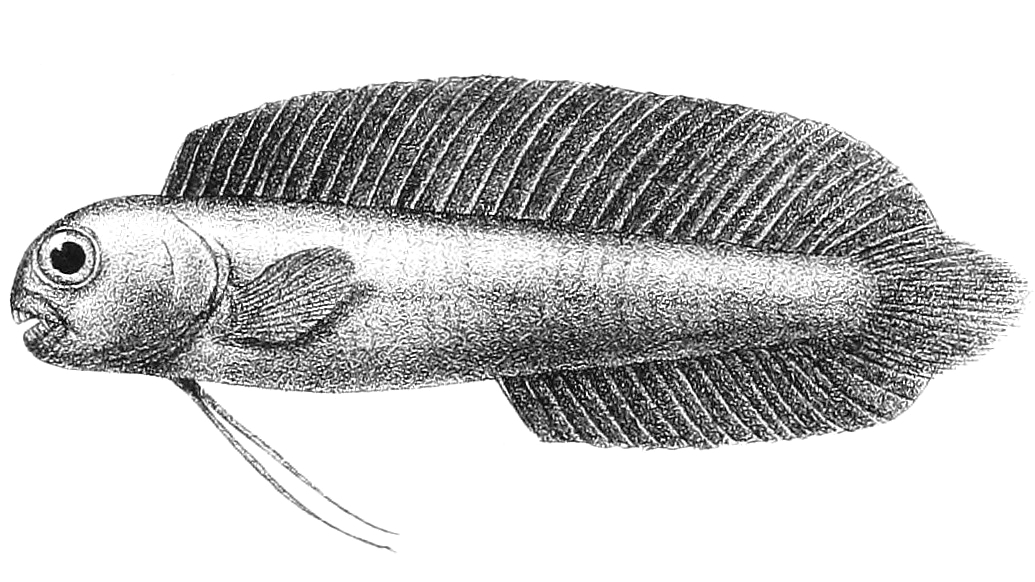
- Euchelyurus ater

Conservation status
- Least Concern (IUCN 3.1)

Scientific classification
- Kingdom: Animalia
- Phylum: Chordata
- Class: Actinopterygii
- Order: Blenniiformes
- Family: Blenniidae
- Genus: Enchelyurus
- Species: E. ater

Binomial name
- Enchelyurus ater (Günther, 1877)

Synonyms
- Petroscirtes ater Günther, 1877

= Enchelyurus ater =

Species of fish

Enchelyurus ater, the black blenny, is a species of combtooth blenny found in the Pacific Ocean. This species grows to a length of 5.5 centimetres (2.2 in) TL.
