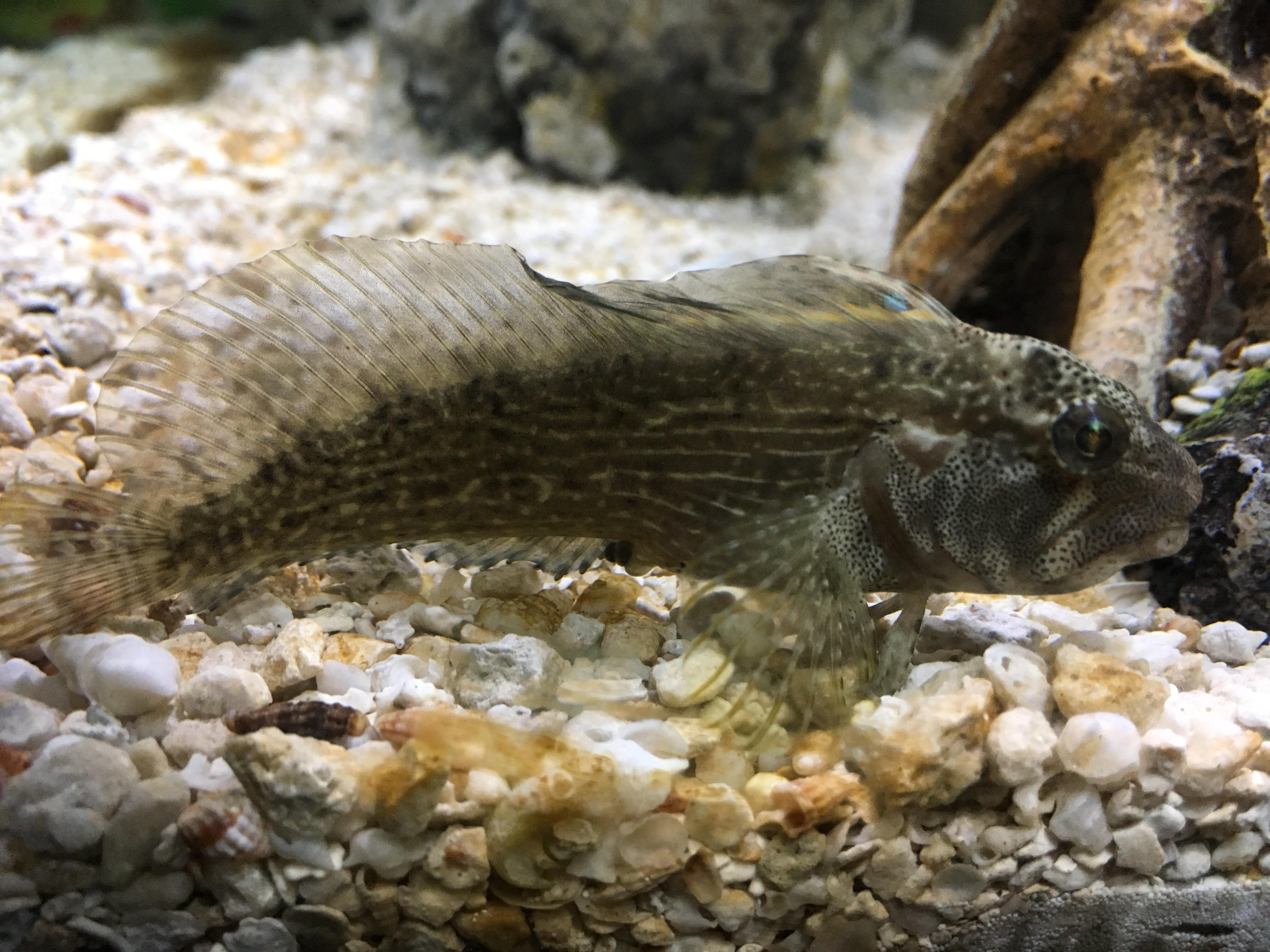

Conservation status
- Least Concern (IUCN 3.1)

Scientific classification
- Kingdom: Animalia
- Phylum: Chordata
- Class: Actinopterygii
- Division: Teleostei
- Order: Blenniiformes
- Family: Blenniidae
- Genus: Chasmodes
- Species: C. bosquianus

Binomial name
- Chasmodes bosquianus (Lacépède, 1800)

Synonyms
- Blennius bosquianus Lacepède, 1800

= Chasmodes bosquianus =

Striped blenny

Species of fish

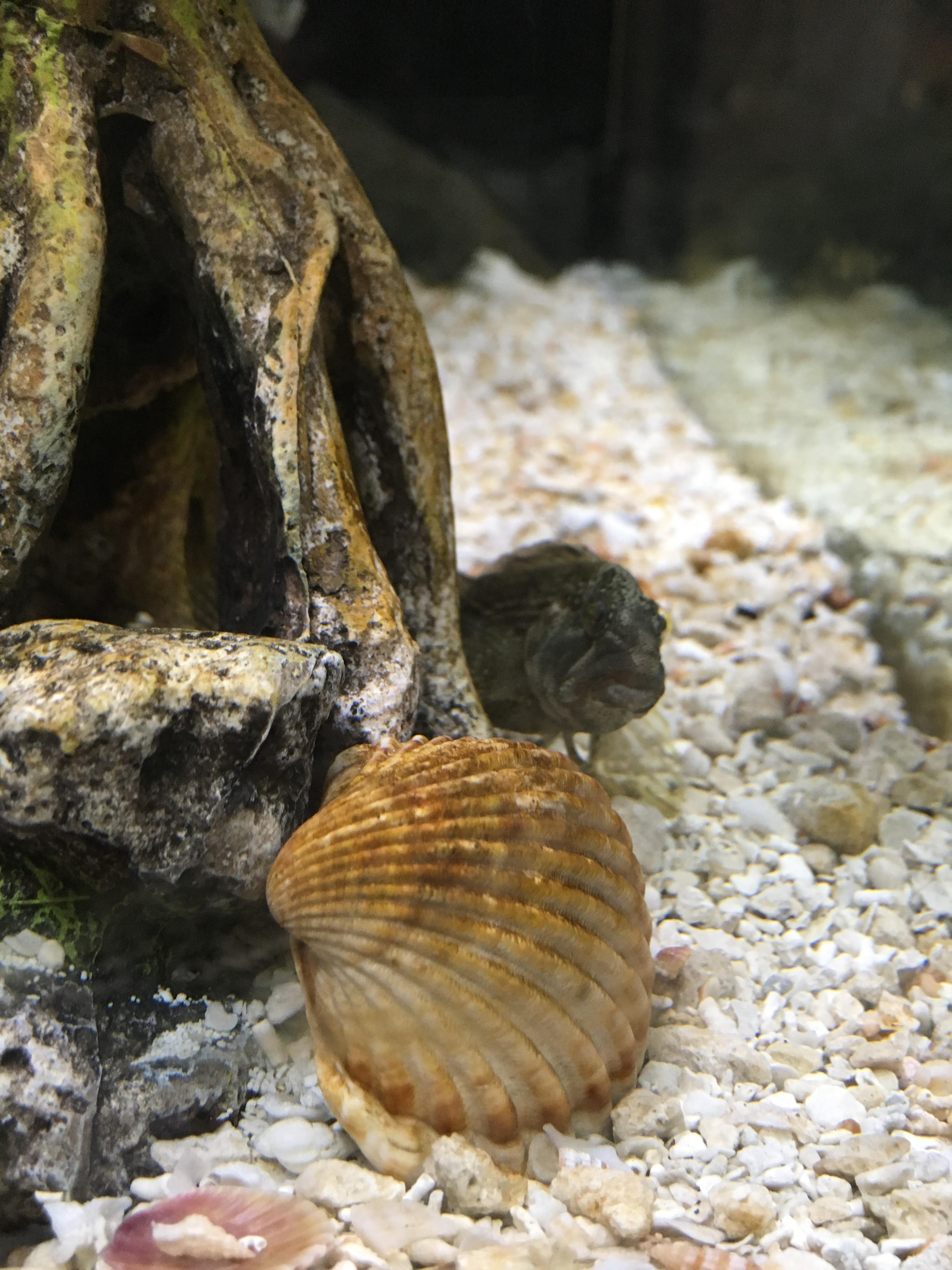
Striped blennies can be very playful and curious in the home aquarium.

Chasmodes bosquianus, the striped blenny, is a species of combtooth blenny found in the western Atlantic ocean, from New York to Florida. The specific name uses the suffix -ianus to denote "belonging to" and refers to the French naturalist Louis Augustin Guillaume Bosc (1759–1828), whose notes Bernard Germain de Lacépède used to base his description of this blenny.
