= Adelotremus deloachi =

Conservation status
- Least Concern (IUCN 3.1)

Scientific classification
- Kingdom: Animalia
- Phylum: Chordata
- Class: Actinopterygii
- Division: Teleostei
- Order: Blenniiformes
- Family: Blenniidae
- Genus: Adelotremus
- Species: A. deloachi

Binomial name
- Adelotremus deloachi Smith-Vaniz, 2017

Species of fish

Adelotremus deloachi, the spotfin fangblenny, is a species of combtooth blenny from the western Pacific Ocean in Indonesia. The type and paratypes were collected from Bali and the Lembeh Strait. The specimens were collected from depths of 10–17 metres (33–56 ft) from sandy slopes. The specific name honours Ned Deloach, an author and photographer who has written about reef fishes and raised awareness of their conservation.
