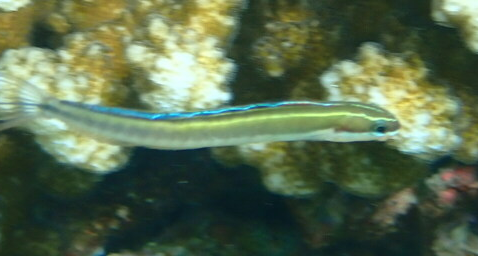

Conservation status
- Least Concern (IUCN 3.1)

Scientific classification
- Kingdom: Animalia
- Phylum: Chordata
- Class: Actinopterygii
- Order: Blenniiformes
- Family: Blenniidae
- Genus: Plagiotremus
- Species: P. azaleus

Binomial name
- Plagiotremus azaleus (D. S. Jordan & Bollman, 1890)

Synonyms
- Runula azalea Jordan & Bollman, 1890; Atopoclinus ringens Vaillant, 1894; Runula ringens (Vaillant, 1894)

= Plagiotremus azaleus =

Species of fish

Plagiotremus azaleus, the sabertooth blenny, is a species of combtooth blenny found in coral reefs in the eastern Pacific Ocean. This species reaches a length of 10 centimetres (3.9 in) TL.
