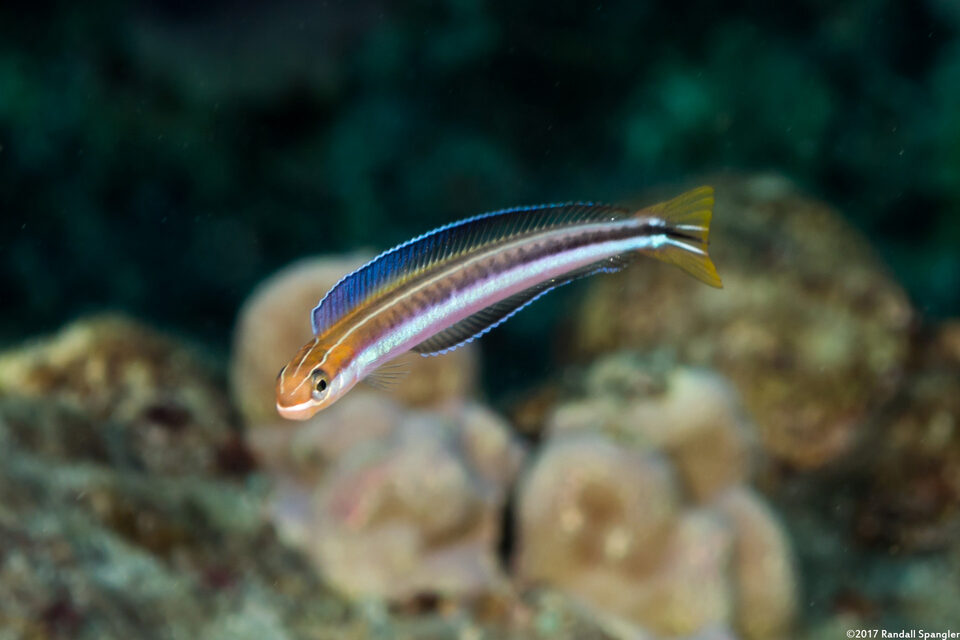

Conservation status
- Least Concern (IUCN 3.1)

Scientific classification
- Kingdom: Animalia
- Phylum: Chordata
- Class: Actinopterygii
- Order: Blenniiformes
- Family: Blenniidae
- Genus: Plagiotremus
- Species: P. goslinei

Binomial name
- Plagiotremus goslinei (Strasburg, 1956)

Synonyms
- Runula goslinei Strasburg, 1956

= Plagiotremus goslinei =

Species of fish

Plagiotremus goslinei, commonly known as the biting blenny, Gosline's fangblenny, the scale-eating blenny, the Ewa fang blenny, the blue-stripe blenny, or the scale-eating fang blenny, is a species of combtooth blenny. The species epithet honours the American ichthyologist William A. Gosline (1915-2002) of the University of Hawaiʻi.

== Description ==
This species reaches a length of 6.3 cm (2.5 in) SL. The biting blenny is also known as the striped blenny for the bright blue stripes that run down its body. The biting blenny has two large canines on its bottom jaw. This fish's sharp fangs can, when it is eaten by larger fish, hold on to the esophagus to prevent itself from being swallowed. These fangs can also be poisonous, giving the receiver an opioid poison.

== Habitat and distribution ==
The biting blenny is found in coral reefs in Hawaii and in the eastern central Pacific Ocean.

== Diet ==
The diet of the biting blenny is diverse. It consists of mucus, scales, and skin tissue of larger fish, shrimp, small crustaceans, worms, zooplankton, and fish eggs. The biting blenny sneaks up behind larger fish and takes bites out of their backs and sides.

== Population ==
The biting blenny is currently stable and abundant around the warm waters surrounding the Hawaiian Islands. It is considered a least concerned population.
