= Enchelyurus flavipes =

Conservation status
- Least Concern (IUCN 3.1)

Scientific classification
- Kingdom: Animalia
- Phylum: Chordata
- Class: Actinopterygii
- Order: Blenniiformes
- Family: Blenniidae
- Genus: Enchelyurus
- Species: E. flavipes

Binomial name
- Enchelyurus flavipes W. K. H. Peters, 1868

Species of fish

Enchelyurus flavipes, the yellowfin blenny, is a species of combtooth blenny from the western Pacific Ocean. It occasionally makes its way into the aquarium trade.
