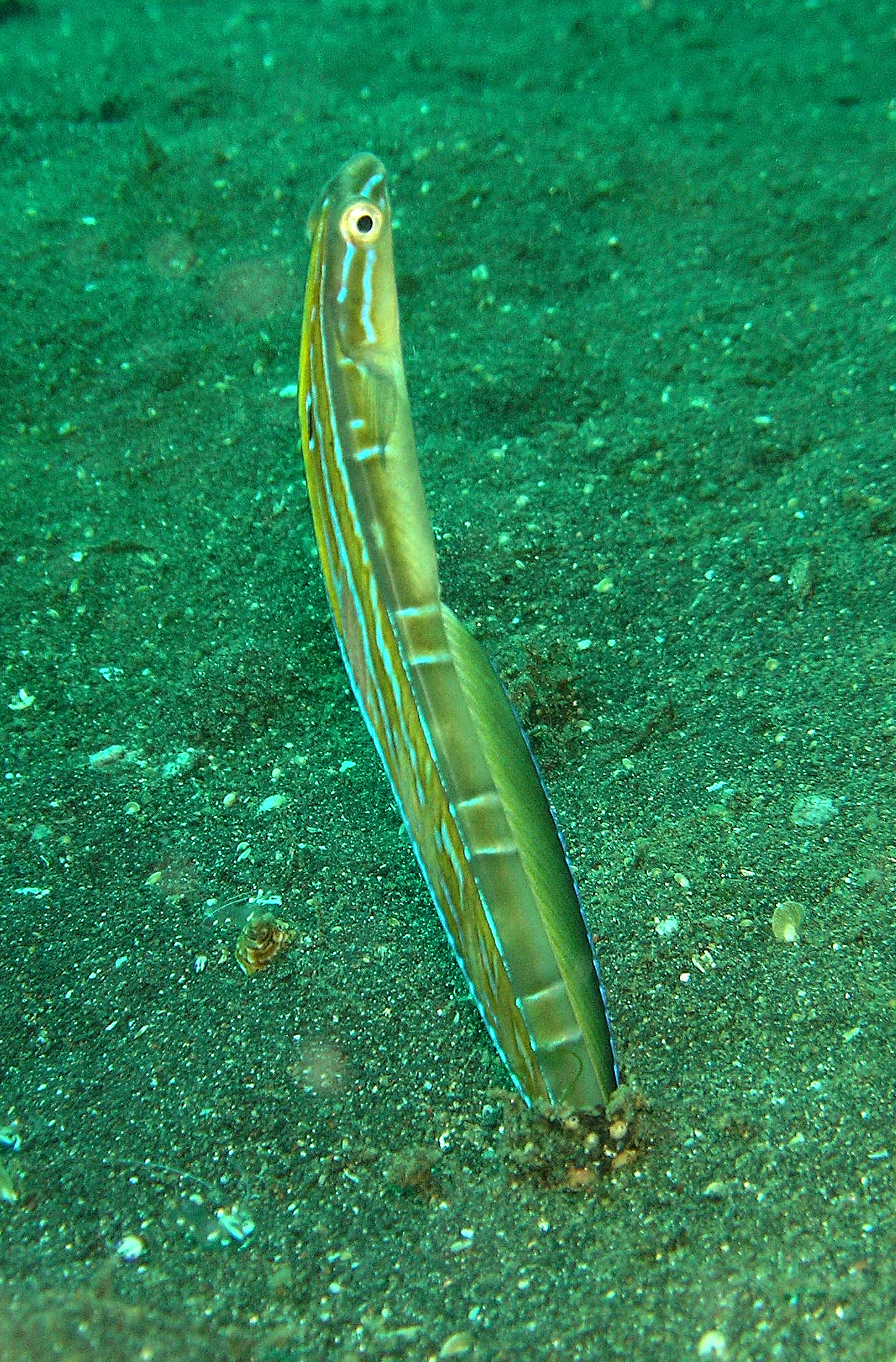

Conservation status
- Least Concern (IUCN 3.1)

Scientific classification
- Kingdom: Animalia
- Phylum: Chordata
- Class: Actinopterygii
- Order: Blenniiformes
- Family: Blenniidae
- Genus: Xiphasia
- Species: X. setifer

Binomial name
- Xiphasia setifer Swainson, 1839

= Xiphasia setifer =

Species of fish

Xiphasia setifer, the hairtail blenny or the snake blenny, is a species of combtooth blenny found in the western Pacific and Indian Oceans. This species reaches 53 cm (21 in) in SL and is the longest species of combtooth blenny. It can also be found in the aquarium trade.
