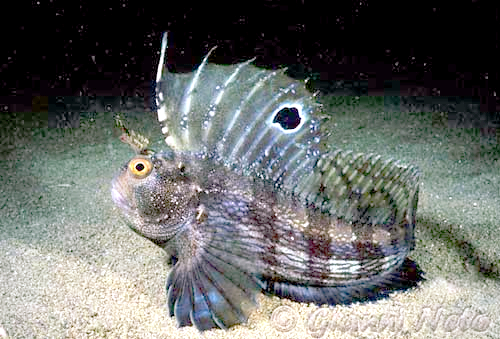
- Blennius ocellaris

Scientific classification
- Kingdom: Animalia
- Phylum: Chordata
- Class: Actinopterygii
- Order: Blenniiformes
- Family: Blenniidae
- Subfamily: Blenniinae; Rafinesque, 1810

= Blenniinae =

Subfamily of fishes

Blenniinae is one of two subfamilies in the combtooth blenny family Blenniidae, it is the smallest of the two subfamilies in the Blennidae with 16 genera and 95 species.

== Genera ==
The following genera are classifies as belonging to the Blenniinae:

- Adelotremus Smith-Vaniz & Rose, 2012
- Aspidontus Cuvier, 1834
- Blennius Linnaeus, 1758
- Enchelyurus Peters, 1868
- Haptogenys Springer, 1972
- Laiphognathus J. L. B. Smith, 1955
- Meiacanthus Norman, 1944
- Oman Springer, 1985
- Omobranchus Valenciennes, 1836
- Omox Springer, 1972
- Parenchelyurus Springer, 1972
- Petroscirtes Rüppell, 1830
- Phenablennius Springer & Smith-Vaniz, 1972
- Plagiotremus Gill, 1865
- Spaniblennius Bath & Wirtz, 1989
- Xiphasia Swainson, 1839
