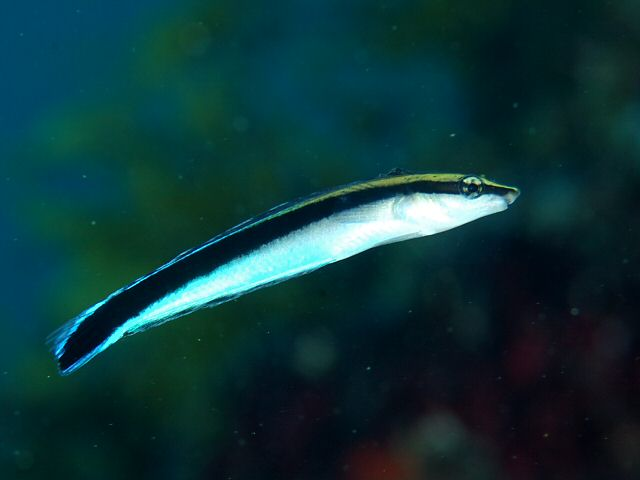

Conservation status
- Least Concern (IUCN 3.1)

Scientific classification
- Kingdom: Animalia
- Phylum: Chordata
- Class: Actinopterygii
- Division: Teleostei
- Order: Blenniiformes
- Family: Blenniidae
- Genus: Aspidontus
- Species: A. taeniatus

Binomial name
- Aspidontus taeniatus Quoy & Gaimard, 1834

Synonyms
- Blennechis filamentosus Valenciennes, 1836; Aspidontus filamentosus (Valenciennes, 1836); Aspidontus tractus (Fowler, 1903)

= False cleanerfish =

Species of fish

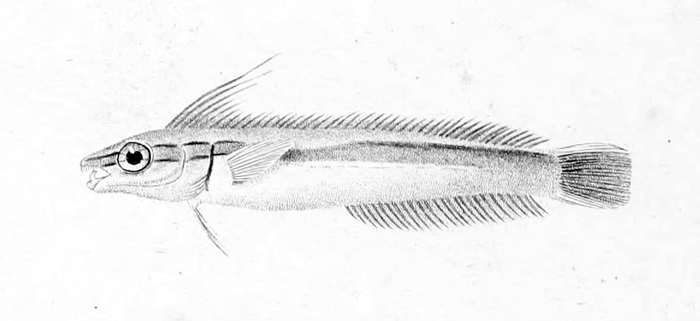
Aspidontus tractus

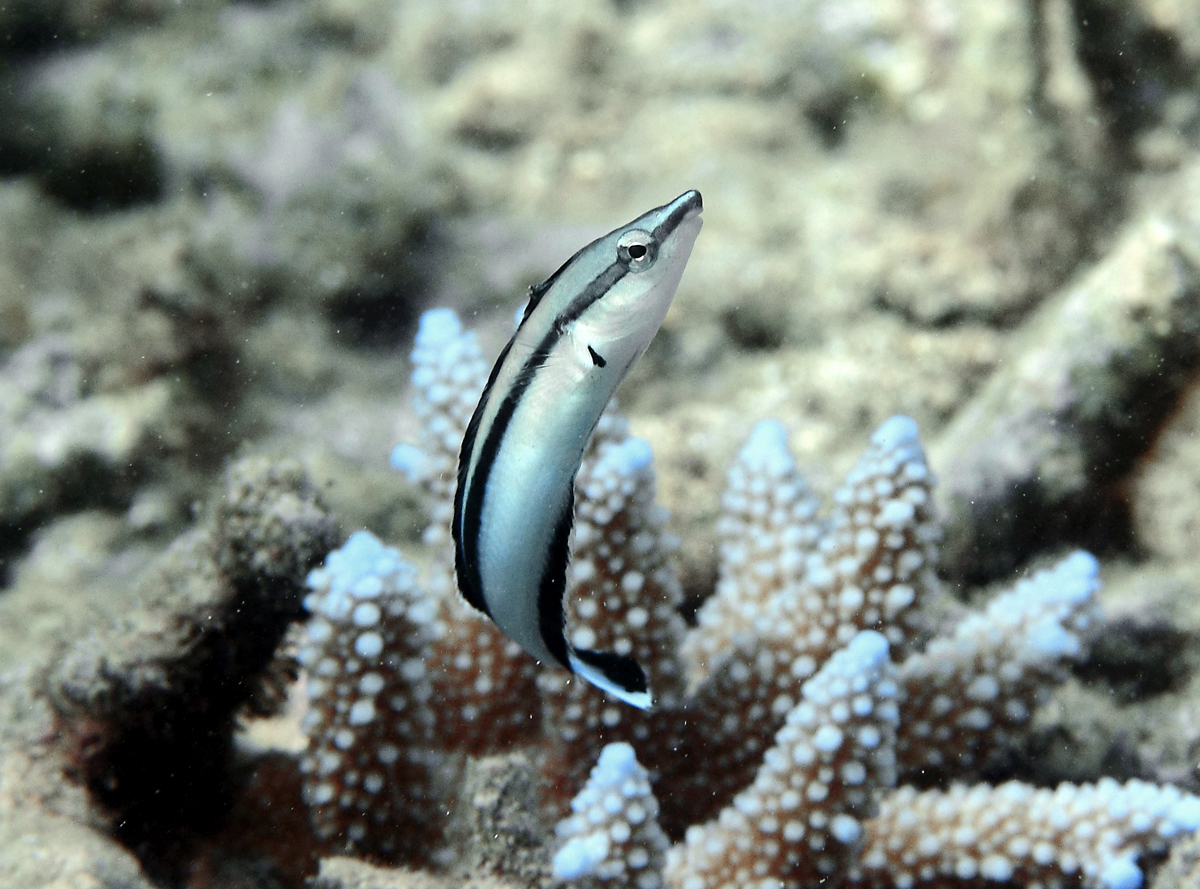
Aspidontus tractus.

The false cleanerfish (Aspidontus taeniatus) is a species of combtooth blenny, a mimic that copies both the dance and appearance of Labroides dimidiatus (the bluestreak cleaner wrasse), a similarly colored species of cleaner wrasse. It likely mimics that species to avoid predation, as well as to occasionally bite the fins of its victims rather than consume parasites. Most veiled attacks occur on juvenile fish, as adults that have been attacked in the past may avoid or even attack A. taeniatus.

It is indigenous to coral reef habitats in the Indo-Pacific.

== Mimicry ==
=== Appearance ===
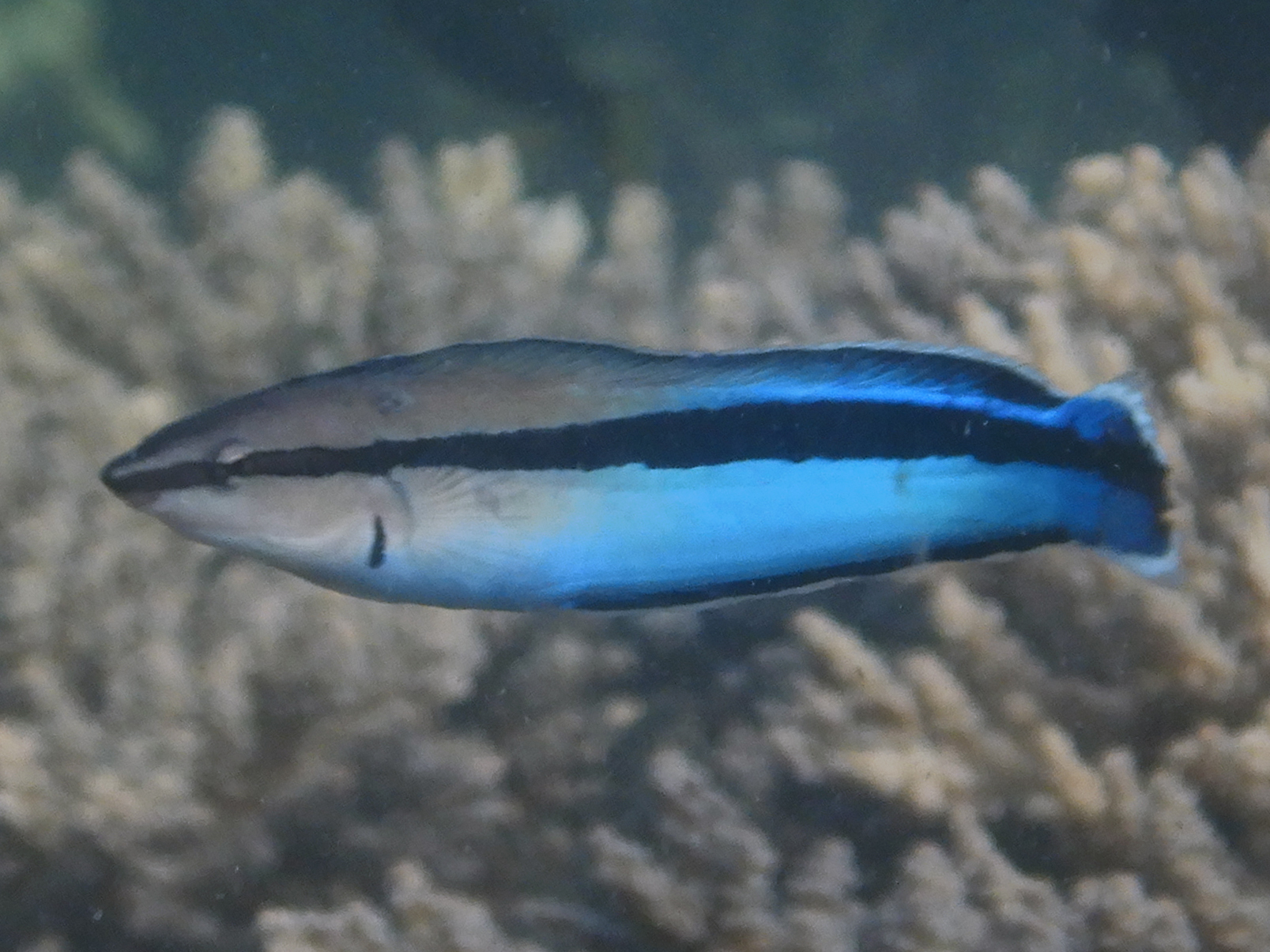
In Kenya

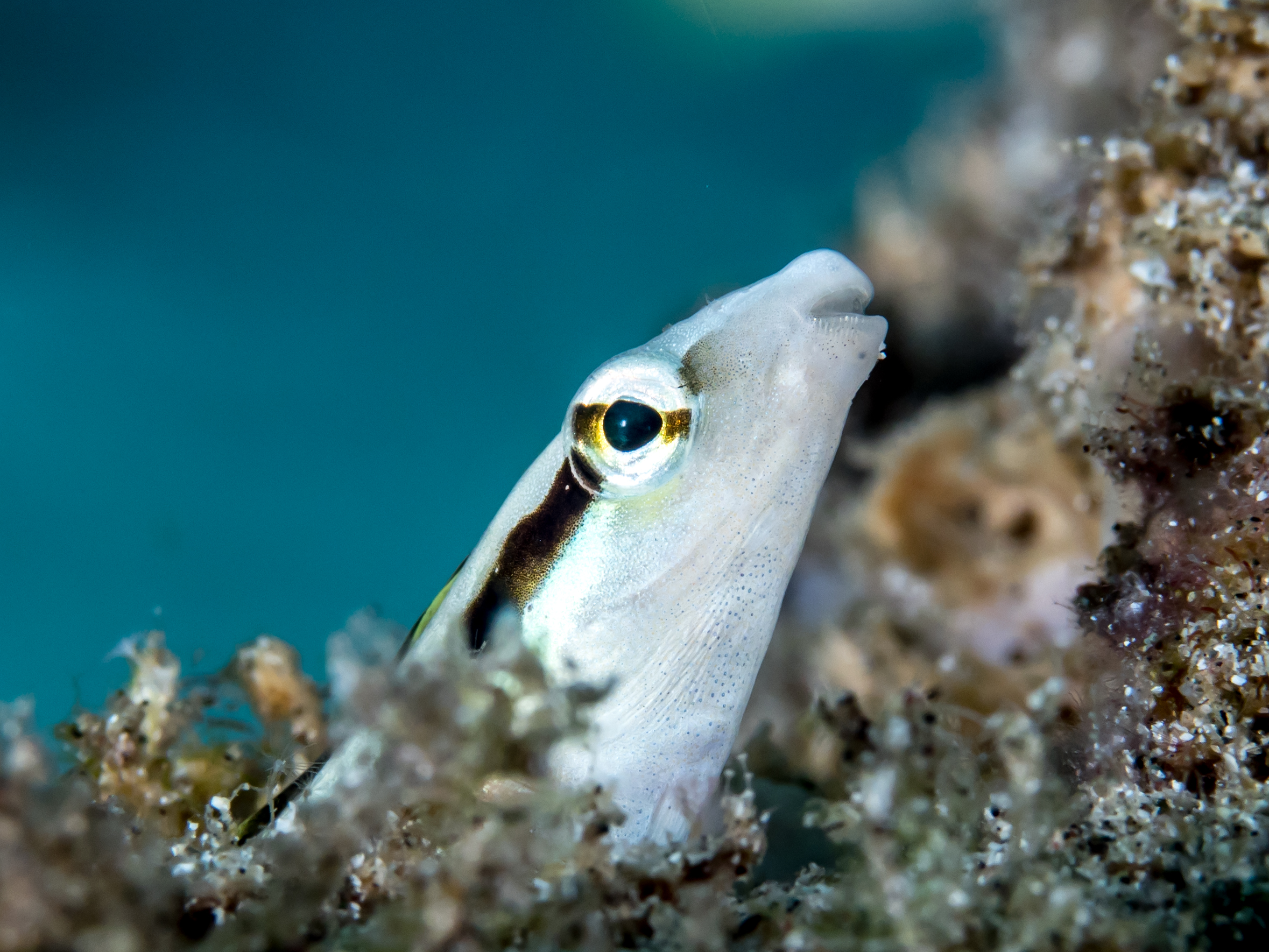
Head closeup

The false cleanerfish primarily lives in coral reef margins among the cleaning stations of the bluestreak cleaner wrasse (Labroides dimidiatus), and are usually seen near locations of one or more L. dimidiatus. With its territory primarily overlapping with its model fish, the false cleanerfish mimics both the appearance and occasionally the behavior of said fish. Though A. taeniatus is typically known to exhibit the characteristic black stripe and blue body and general body shape and structure of L. dimidiatus, some individuals have been witnessed to mimic the appearance of other reef fish, as well as atypically colored cleaner wrasses that live in the same territory.

Juvenile A. taeniatus fish match the appearance of juvenile L. dimidiatus (black body, blue dorsal stripe), and continue to match the coloration of cleaner wrasses of the same size throughout growth. It is not known whether the false cleanerfish adopts a permanent color pattern or if it alters its coloration to mimic the appearance of neighboring cleaner wrasses.

One major difference in appearance between the false cleanerfish and its model is the location of the mouth. A. taeniatus has an underslung mouth, whereas L. dimidiatus has its mouth in the terminal position. Additionally, the false cleanerfish has a small set of teeth on the upper mandible, as well as enormous canines that protrude from its lower jaw and fit into sockets laterally on the roof of its mouth.

It reaches the length of 10 centimetres (3.9 in) TL.

=== Cheating behaviour ===
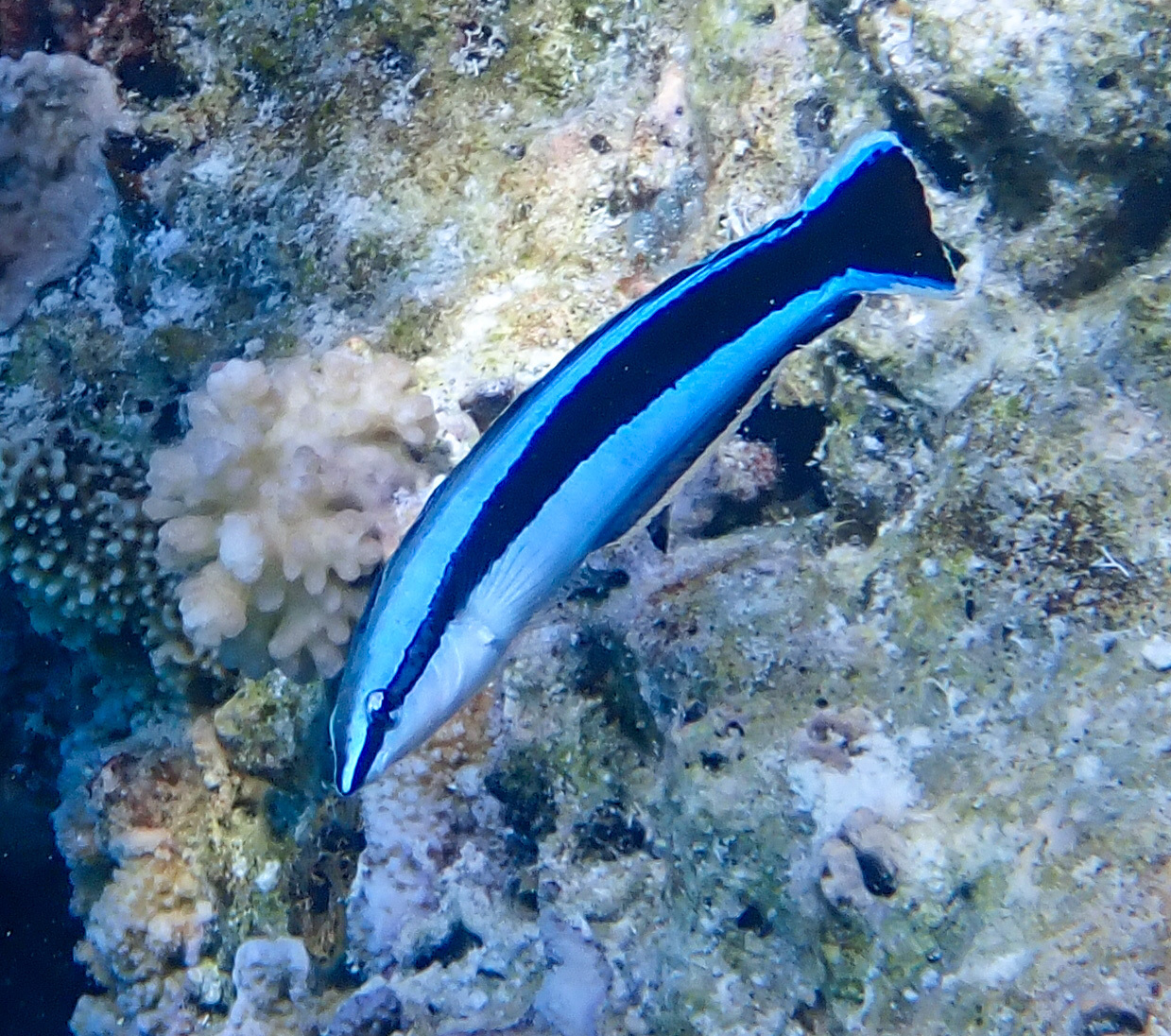
In French Polynesia

The false cleanerfish has been observed to mimic the unusual "dance" of the bluestreak cleaner wrasse by spreading its caudal fin and oscillating its posterior end up and down. By doing so, the false cleanerfish elicits the same posing behavior in client fish, similarly to L. dimidiatus. Occasionally, however, rather than feeding on ectoparasites like the cleaner wrasse, the false cleanerfish will attack and attempt (and sometimes succeed) at tearing away portions of fin from the client fish. This typically occurs and is most successful with juvenile client fish, as adults have been evidenced to avoid or even indiscriminately attack cleanerfish, suggesting adult client fish remember being attacked. Also, evidence indicates adult fish are able to distinguish between L. dimidiatus and A. taeniatus, and thus avoid it altogether.

=== Evolutionary basis ===
Though A. taeniatus mimics L. dimidiatus in color, morphology, and mode of swimming, the false cleanerfish cheats much less often than initially reported. The stomach contents of A. taeniatus consist primarily of the demersal eggs of fishes and the tentacles of tube worms, with a relatively small portion of fish fins, or ectoparasites—the primary stomach contents of L. dimidiatus. Additionally, close observation of A. taeniatus has shown them to only attack posing clients at a rate of about 20%.

The primary reason for the false cleanerfish's mimicry is suggested to be not to cheat and feed on the flesh of client fish, but to avoid predation by those fish that do not prey on L. dimidiatus. Aggressive mimicry typically results in the complete consumption of prey by a mimic predator (such as anglerfish), or partial consumption of prey by an unattractive mimic. In both cases, the host fish can rarely or never learn the disguise of the mimic; the fact that A. taeniatus can be easily identified by client fish helps to dispel the notion that it is primarily an aggressive mimic. Groupers raised in captivity do not attack L. dimidiatus, while they do consume all other noncleanerfish on sight. Furthermore, false cleanerfish inflict a higher cost on their models and cleaning stations when cheating, as client fish are more likely to behave aggressively or avoid cleaning stations altogether if they are consistently attacked.

However, there is evidence of geographical variation on the benefits obtained by the mimicry: whereas in the Red Sea and the Great Barrier Reef foraging on tube worms or substrate was more common than attacks by mimics, in French Polynesia and Indonesia false cleanerfish (especially juveniles) fed on client fish tissue more commonly than other food sources. An alternate reason for the mimicry behavior of A. taeniatus is to deceive egg-caring fishes so to more easily gain access to their eggs; however, little evidence favors this possibility.

The evolution of A. taeniatus to mimic L. dimidiatus has been used as evidence for the strong selection of client fish that do not attack their cleaners, or cheat and consume their cleaners after cleaning. Furthermore, the behavior of A. taeniatus mimicking L. dimidiatus in a largely nonaggressive way supports the hypothesis of the evolution of reciprocally altruistic behavior.
