= Klipfish =

Klipfish is any of various species of fish of the family Clinidae from South Africa:

- Agile klipfish Clinus agilis
- Barbelled klipfish Cirrhibarbis capensis
- Bearded klipfish Pavoclinus mentalis
- Bluespotted klipfish Pavoclinus caeruleopunctatus
- Bluntnose klipfish Clinus cottoides
- Bot River klipfish Clinus spatulatus
- Bull klipfish Clinus taurus
- Cape klipfish Clinus brevicristatus
- Chinese klipfish Clinus nematopterus
- Deep-reef klipfish Pavoclinus smalei
- Deepwater klipfish Pavoclinus profundus
- False Bay klipfish Clinus latipennis
- Fleet Klipfish Climacoporus navalis
- Grass klipfish Pavoclinus graminis
- Helen's klipfish Clinus helenae
- Highfin Klipfish Clinus superciliosus
- Kelp klipfish Clinus rotundifrons
- Lace klipfish Blennioclinus brachycephalus
- Ladder klipfish Clinoporus biporosus
- Leafy klipfish Smithichthys fucorum
- Leprous platanna-klipfish Xenopoclinus leprosus
- Mousey klipfish Fucomimus mus
- Mya's klipfish Pavoclinus myae
- Nosestripe klipfish Muraenoclinus dorsalis
- Oldman klipfish Clinus woodi
- Peacock klipfish Pavoclinus pavo
- Platanna klipfish Xenopoclinus kochi
- Rippled klipfish Pavoclinus laurentii
- Robust klipfish Clinus robustus
- Sad klipfish Clinus acuminatus
- Silverbubble klipfish Blennioclinus stella
- Slender platanna-klipfish Cancelloxus burrelli
- Slinky klipfish Pavoclinus litorafontis
- Snaky klipfish Blennophis anguillaris
- Speckled klipfish Clinus venustris
- Striped klipfish Blennophis striatus
- Super klipfish Clinus superciliosus
- Westcoast klipfish Clinus heterodon
- Whiteblotched klipfish Cancelloxus elongatus
