= Tsitsikamma Marine Protected Area =

Marine conservation area on the south coast of South Africa

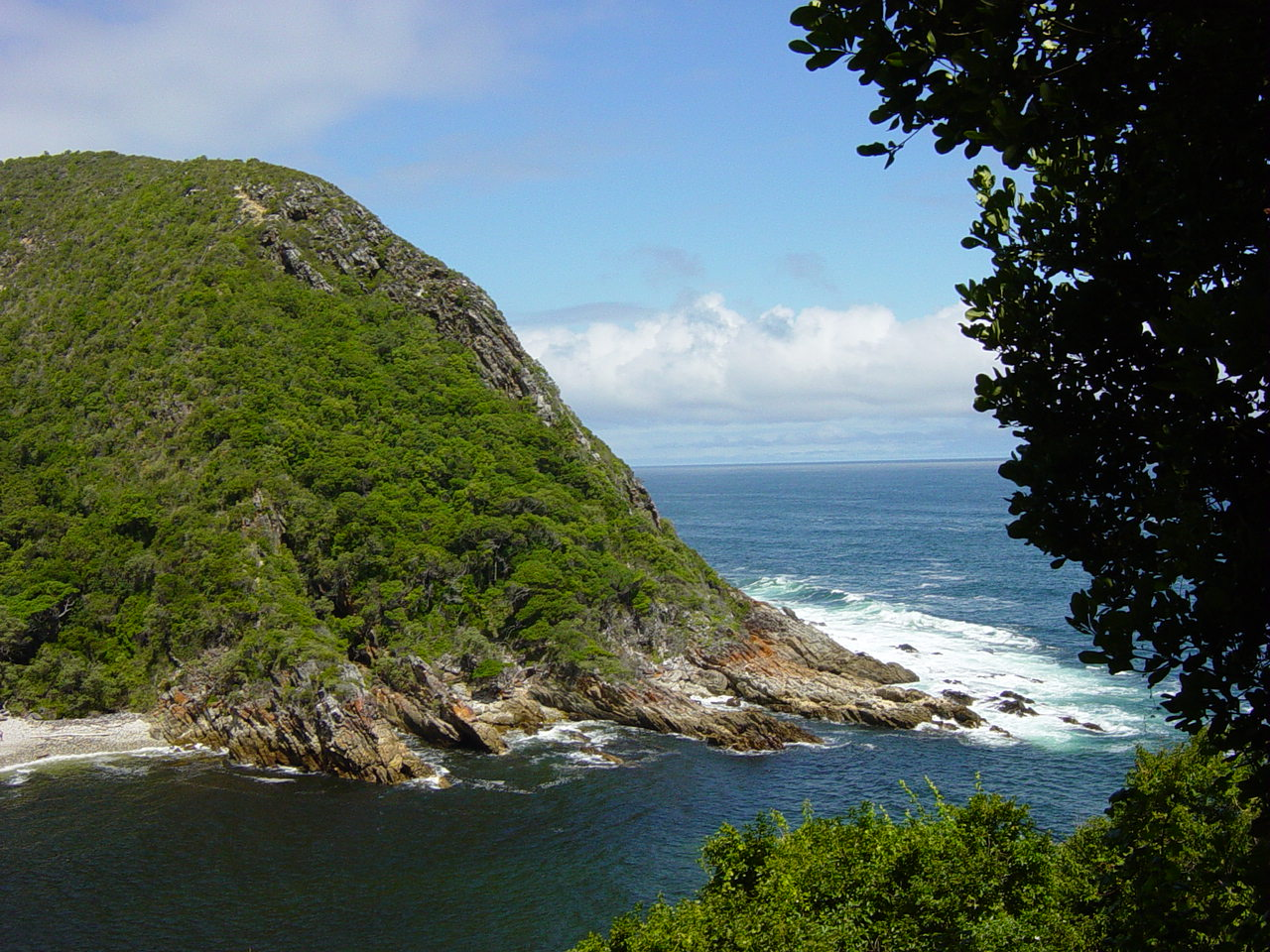
- Storms River mouth in the Tsitsikamma Marine Protected Area
- Tsitsikamma MPA location
- Location: Western Cape and Eastern Cape, South Africa
- Nearest city: Knysna
- Coordinates: 34°01′S 23°53′E
- Area: 186 km^{2} (72 sq mi)
- Governing body: SANParks
- Tsitsikamma Marine Protected Area (South Africa)

The Tstsikamma Marine Protected Area is a marine protected area on the south coast of South Africa, in both the Western Cape and Eastern Cape. It is on the coast of the Tsitsikamma National Park, and is one of the oldest MPAs in the country. The MPA provides protection for marine habitat and wildlife, including birds and threatened and endangered fish species.

The MPA is in near pristine condition, and is a suitable area for research on endangered fish species. It was designated as a Marine Protected Area in 1964. The length of the protected shoreline is 60 km, and the area of protected ocean is 186 km^{2}.

The MPA is managed by SANParks.

== History ==
The MPA was proclaimed by the Minister of Environmental Affairs and Tourism, Mohammed Valli Moosa, in Government Gazette No. 21948 of 29 December 2000 in terms section 43 of the Marine Natural Resources Act, 18 of 1998.

== Purpose ==
A marine protected area is defined by the IUCN as "A clearly defined geographical space, recognised, dedicated and managed, through legal or other effective means, to achieve the long-term conservation of nature with associated ecosystem services and cultural values".

The protected area's objectives include conserving the coastal and offshore ecosystems of the Agulhas Inshore Bioregion, protecting threatened species, and maintaining ecological process. It also protects fish spawning stocks and nursery areas to support population recovery and increase marine resource abundance in adjacent waters. Areas close to fishing give reference sites for scientific research and monitoring, including comparisons with areas where limited recreational fishing is permitted.

== Extent ==
The length of the protected shoreline is 60 km, and the area of protected ocean is 186 km^{2}.

=== Zonation ===
The entire MPA is zoned as a restricted (no-take) area.

=== Boundaries ===
- Northern boundary is the high-water mark between Die Punt, Nature's Valley, at S33°59.0' E023°34.561' (west), and the right bank of the Grootrivier at S34°03.6', E024°11.665, (east)
- Eastern boundary is a line from the right bank of the Grootrivier at S34°03.6', E024°11.665, running due south to a point three nautical miles offshore at S34°06.6', E024°11.665
- Southern boundary is a straight line from S34°06.6', E024°11.665, approximately parallel to the shore, to a point three nautical miles from the high-water mark at S34°01.817', E023°38.857E measured along a line running due south from the right bank of the mouth of the Bloukrans River, and then due north to a point 0.5 nautical miles from the high-water mark at S33°59.317', E023°38.857', and then along a straight line roughly parallel to the shoreline to a point at S33°59.5', E023°34.561' due south of Die Punt, Nature's Valley.
- The western boundary is a line from the high-water mark at Die Punt, Natures Valley, at S33°59.0' E023°34.561' due south to a point about 0.5 nautical miles offshore at S33°59.5', E023°34.561' The northern boundary of the MPA is the southern boundary of the Tsitsikamma National Park

==== Restricted areas ====
The whole MPA is a restricted zone.

== Management ==
The marine protected areas of South Africa are the responsibility of the national government, which has management agreements with a variety of MPA management authorities, in this case, South African National Parks (SANParks), which manages the MPA with funding from the SA Government through the Department of Environmental Affairs (DEA).

The Department of Agriculture, Forestry and Fisheries is responsible for issuing permits, quotas and law enforcement.

== Use ==
=== Activities requiring a permit ===
==== Scuba diving ====
A permit is required to scuba dive in any MPA in South Africa. These permits are valid for a year and are available at some branches of the Post Office. Temporary permits, valid for a month, may be available at dive shops or from dive boat operators who operate in an MPA. A personal recreational scuba diving permit is valid in all South African MPAs where recreational diving is allowed. The business permit to operate recreational scuba business operations in an MPA is restricted to a specific MPA. Diving for commercial or scientific purposes is also subject to permit. There is an office at the Storms River mouth slipway where dives can be organised.

===== Named dive sites =====
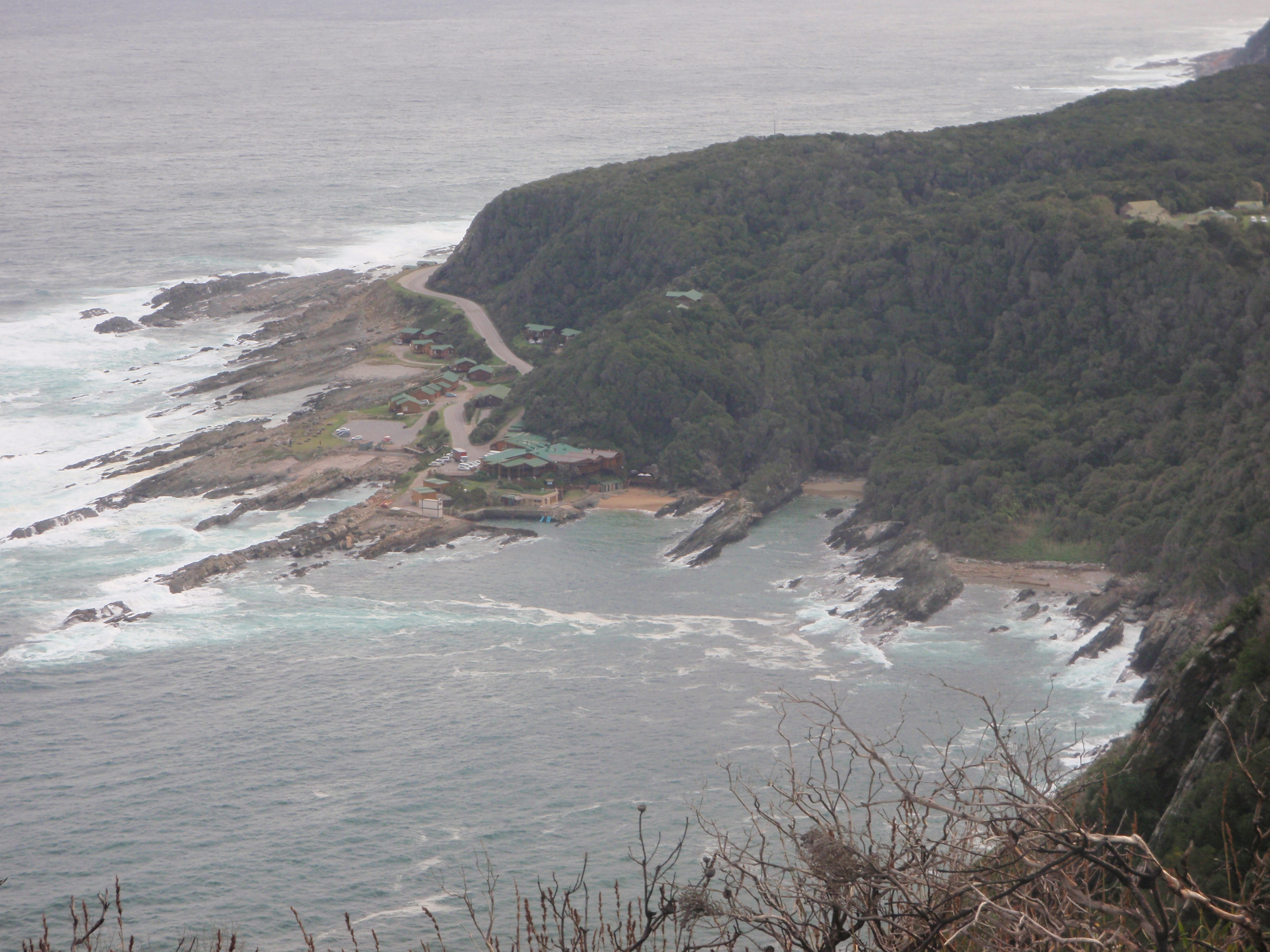
View of the dive site at Storms River Mouth from across the river. The slipway and restaurant are visible slightly left of centre, where the road ends.

The MPA has several rocky reef recreational dive sites which have been identified by position and named. Some of them are listed here:

- Storm's River Mouth, 34°01.355′S 23°53.928′E
- The Knoll, just off the cliffs east of the Storms River mouth
- Rheeders' Reef, 34.02901°S 23.92825°E
- Middle Bank, offshore from Storms River mouth

== Geography ==
=== General topography ===
The coastline is fairly straight, and is generally very steep from a relatively flat coastal region between the inland mountains and the sea. Much of the shoreline can best be described as cliffs. The Storms River gorge is roughly perpendicular to the coastline, and very narrow — the sides are approximately vertical. A boat trip or hike up the gorge will show a section through the coastal formations.

=== Geology ===
The rock formations are heavily folded sandstones and shales of the Table Mountain series. The coastline formation to the west of the river mouth is the Silurian Tchando formation, which is typically fine to coarse grained brown sandstone and shale, and inland and across the river to the east, mostly Ordovician Peninsula sandstone. Offshore formations may include Devonian Gydo shales and siltstones. Folding is roughly parallel to the coastline, and dip is frequently near vertical, even overfolded in places. Resistance to weathering is also very variable, with some extremely resistant quartzitic sandstone, and some very friable shales. As a result, there are areas with distinct ridges, often roughly parallel to the shoreline.

== Ecology ==
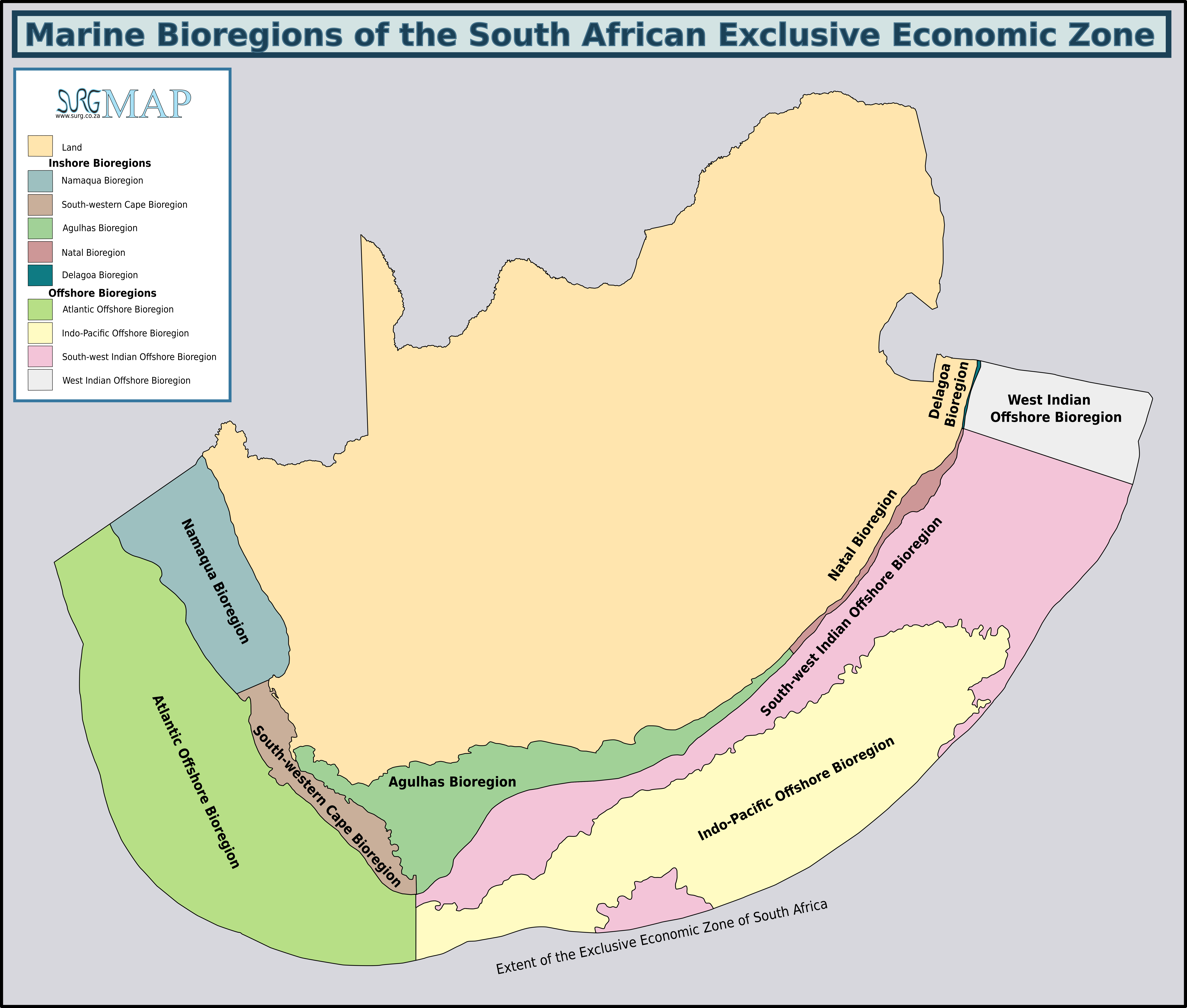
Marine bioregions of the South African Exclusive Economic Zone: The Tsitsikamma Marine Protected Area is in the Agulhas bioregion.

The MPA is in the warm temperate Agulhas inshore marine bioregion to the east of Cape Point which extends eastwards to the Mbashe River. The Mbashe River was chosen as the most appropriate boundary between the subtropical Natal province to the north, and the warm temperate Agulhas region to the south, but change is gradual between these regions. Upwelling on the south coast of South Africa is largely driven by the Agulhas current and the continental shelf. This form of upwelling forces cold deep water up onto the continental shelf, but not necessarily above the thermocline. In the region east of the Agulhas bank, wind enhanced upwelling, occurring mainly in summer, augments the current driven upwelling bringing the colder deeper waters to the surface. This enhances biological productivity by supply of nutrients to the euphotic zone (where plants have sufficient light to flourish) which fuels phytoplankton production, and rocky shores that are supplied with the nutrient rich water support rich algal biomass. There are a large proportion of species endemic to South Africa along this coastline.

Three major habitats exist in the sea in this region, distinguished by the nature of the substrate. The substrate, or base material, is important in that it provides a base to which an organism can anchor itself, which is vitally important for those organisms which need to stay in one particular kind of place. Rocky shores and reefs provide a firm fixed substrate for the attachment of plants and animals. Sandy beaches and bottoms are a relatively unstable substrate and cannot anchor kelp or many of the other benthic organisms. Finally there is open water, above the substrate and clear of the kelp forest, where the organisms must drift or swim. Mixed habitats are also frequently found, which are a combination of those mentioned above. There are no significant estuarine habitats in the MPA.

Rocky shores and reefs There are rocky reefs and mixed rocky and sandy bottoms. For many marine organisms the substrate is another type of marine organism, and it is common for several layers to co-exist. Examples of this are red bait pods, which are usually encrusted with sponges, ascidians, bryozoans, anemones, and gastropods, and abalone, which are usually covered by similar seaweeds to those found on the surrounding rocks, usually with a variety of other organisms living on the seaweeds.

The type of rock of the reef is of some importance, as it influences the range of possibilities for the local topography, which in turn influences the range of habitats provided, and therefore the diversity of inhabitants. Sandstone and other sedimentary rocks erode and weather very differently, and depending on the direction of dip and strike, and steepness of the dip, may produce reefs which are relatively flat to very high profile and full of small crevices. These features may be at varying angles to the shoreline and wave fronts. There are fewer large holes, tunnels and crevices in sandstone reefs, but often many deep but low near-horizontal crevices.

Sandy beaches and bottoms (including shelly, pebble and gravel bottoms) Sandy bottoms at first glance appear to be fairly barren areas, as they lack the stability to support many of the spectacular reef based species, and the variety of large organisms is relatively low. The sand is continually being moved around by wave action, to a greater or lesser degree depending on weather conditions and exposure of the area. This means that sessile organisms must be specifically adapted to areas of relatively loose substrate to thrive in them, and the variety of species found on a sandy or gravel bottom will depend on all these factors. Sandy bottoms have one important compensation for their instability, animals can burrow into the sand and move up and down within its layers, which can provide feeding opportunities and protection from predation. Other species can dig themselves holes in which to shelter, or may feed by filtering water drawn through the tunnel, or by extending body parts adapted to this function into the water above the sand.

The open sea

=== Marine species diversity ===
==== Animals ====
Myxinidae

- Eptatretus hexatrema, (Müller, 1836), sixgill hagfish

Hexanchidae

- Notorynchus cepedianus, (Péron, 1807), broadnose sevengill shark

Squalidae

- Squalus megalops, (W. J. Macleay, 1881), bluntnose spiny dogfish

Rhincodontidae

- Rhincodon typus, (A. Smith, 1828), whale shark

Carcharhinidae

- Carcharhinus brachyurus, (Günther, 1870), copper shark
- Carcharhinus brevipinna, (J. P. Müller & Henle, 1839), spinner shark
- Carcharhinus obscurus, (Lesueur, 1818), dusky shark
- Galeorhinus galeus, (Linnaeus, 1758), soupfin shark
- Mustelus mustelus, (Linnaeus, 1758), smooth-hound
- Mustelus palumbes, J. L. B. Smith, 1957, whitespotted smooth-hound
- Prionace glauca, (Linnaeus, 1758), blue shark
- Triakis megalopterus, (A. Smith, 1839), spotted gullyshark (endemic)

Scylioshinidae

- Halaelurus natalensis, (Regan, 1904), tiger catshark (endemic)
- Haploblepharus edwardsii, (Schinz, 1822), puffadder shyshark (endemic)
- Haploblepharus fuscus, J. L. B. Smith, 1950, brown shyshark (endemic)
- Haploblepharus pictus, (J. P. Müller & Henle, 1838), dark shyshark (endemic)
- Poroderma africanum, (J. F. Gmelin, 1789), striped catshark (endemic)
- Poroderma pantherinum, (J. P. Müller & Henle, 1838), leopard catshark (endemic)
- Scyliorhinus capensis, (J. P. Müller & Henle, 1838), yellowspotted catchark

Sphrynidae

- Sphyrna sp. hammerhead
- Sphyrna zygaena, (Linnaeus, 1758), smooth hammerhead

Lamnidae

- Carcharodon carcharias, (Linnaeus, 1758), great white shark
- Isurus oxyrinchus, Rafinesque, 1810, short fin mako

Odontaspididae

- Carcharias taurus, Rafinesque, 1810, spotted ragged-tooth

Pristidae

- Pristis pectinata, Latham, 1794, largetooth sawfish

Torpedinidae

- Torpedo fuscomaculata, W. K. H. Peters, 1855, blackspotted electric ray

Rhinobatidae

- Acroteriobatus annulatus, (J. P. Müller & Henle, 1841), recorded as syn. Rhinobatos annulatus, lesser guitarfish (endemic)

Mylobatidae

- Myliobatis aquila, (Linnaeus, 1758), eagleray
- Aetomylaeus bovinus, (É. Geoffroy Saint-Hilaire, 1817) recorded as syn. Pteromylaeus bovinus É. Geoffroy Saint-Hilaire, 1817, bullray

Mobulidae

- Mobula birostris, (Walbaum, 1792), recorded as syn,Manta birostris, (Walbaum, 1792), manta ray
- Mobula mobular, (Bonnaterre, 1788) recorded as syn. Mobula diabolus, (Shaw, 1804), devil ray

Dasyatidae

- Dasyatis marmorata capensis, (Steindachner, 1892) blue stingray
- Gymnura natalensis, (Gilchrist & W. W. Thompson, 1911), backwater butterflyray (endemic)

Eliopidae

- Elops machnata, (Forsskål, 1775), ten pounder

Anguillidae

- Anguilla mossambica, (Peters, 1852), longfin eel

Congridae

- Conger wilsoni, (Bloch & J. G. Schneider, 1801), Cape conger

Ophichthidae

- Ophisurus serpens, (Linnaeus, 1758), sand snake-eel

Clupeidae

- Etrumeus whiteheadi, Wongratana, 1983, redeye roundherring (endemic)
- Gilchristella aestuaria, (Gilchrist, 1913), estuarine roundherring (endemic)
- Sardinops sagax, C. L. Hubbs, 1929, South African pilchard

Engraulidae

- Engraulis japonicus, Temminck & Schlegel, 1846, Cape anchovy

Gonorhynchidae

- Gonorynchus gonorynchus, (Linnaeus, 1766), beaked sandfish

Aritidae

- Galeichthys ater, Castelnau, 1861, black seacatfish (endemic)
- Galeichthys feliceps, Valenciennes in Cuvier & Valenciennes, 1840, white seacatfish (endemic)

Plotosidae

- Plotosus nkunga, Gomon & Taylor, 1982, eel catfish

Stomidae

- Stomias boa boa, (A. Risso, 1810), scaly dragonfish

Synodontidae

- Trachinocephalus myops, (J. R. Forster, 1801), painted lizard fish

Myctophidae

- Diogenichthys atlanticus, lanternfish
- Lampanyctodes hectoris, onderbaadjie
- Symbolophorus barnardi, (Tåning, 1932), lanternfish

Gadidae

- Gaidropsarus capensis, Cape rockling (endemic)

Merlucciidae

- Merluccius capensis, Castelnau, 1861, shallow water hake

Moridae

- Physiculus capensis, Gilchrist, 1922, deepsea cod (endemic)

Bregmacerotidae

- Bregmaceros atlanticus, codlet
- Bregmaceros nectabanus, codlet

Ophidiidae

- Genypterus capensis, kingklip (endemic)

Bythitidae

- Bidenichthys capensis, Barnard, 1934, freetail brotula (endemic)
- Dermatopsoides talboti, Cohen, 1966, lesser orange brotula
- Grammonoides opisthodon, bighead brotula (endemic)

Batrachoididae

- Batrichthys apiatus, snakehead toadfish (endemic)
- Chatrabus hendersoni, chocolate toadfish (endemic)
- Chatrabus melanurus, humpback toadfish (endemic)

Lophiidae

- Lophius upsicephalus, monk (endemic)

Gobiesocidae

- Apletodon pellegrini, chubby clingfish
- Chorisochismus dentex, rocksucker (endemic)
- Diplecogaster megalops, bigeye clingfish (endemic)

Atherinidae

- Atherina breviceps, Cape silverside

Notocheiridae

- Iso natalensis, surf sprite

Hemiramphidae

- Hemiramphus far, spotted halfbeak
- Hyporhamphus capensis, Cape halfbeak

Belonidae

- Petalichthys capensis, Cape needlefish

Berycidae

- Centroberyx spinosus, short alfonsino (endemic)

Zeidae

- Zeus capensis, Cape dory

Syngnathidae

- Hippichthys spicifer, bellybarred pipefish
- Hippocampus capensis, Knysna seahorse
- Syngnathus acus, longsnout pipefish

Macroramphosidae

- Macroramphosus scolopax, slender snipefish

Tetrarogidae

- Coccotropsis gymnoderma, smoothskin scorpionfish (Gilchrist, 1906), (endemic)

Congiopodidae

- Congiopodus spinifer, spinenose horsefish (endemic)
- Congiopodus torvus, smooth horsefish (endemic)

Platycephalidae

- Platycephalus indicus, bartail flathead

Triglidae

- Chelidonichthys capensis, Cape gurnard (endemic)
- Chelidonichthys kumu, bluefin gurnard
- Trigloporus lastoviza africanus, African gurnard (endemic)

Kuhliidae

- Kuhlia mugil, barred flagrail

Serranidae

- Acanthistius sebastoides, (Castelnau, 1861), koester
- Epinephelus andersoni, Boulenger, 1903, catface rockcod (endemic)
- Epinephelus marginatus, (Lowe, 1834), yellowbelly rockcod recorded as Epinephilus emarginata
- Serranus cabrilla, (Linnaeus, 1758), comber

Teraponidae

- Terapon jarbua, (Fabricius [ex Forsskål] in Niebuhr, 1775), thornfish

Scombropidae

- Scombrops boops, (Houttuyn, 1782), gnomefish (endemic)

Pomatomidae

- Pomatomus saltatrix, (Linnaeus, 1766), elf

Haemulidae

- Pomadasys commersonnii, (Lacépède, 1801), spotted grunter
- Pomadasys olivaceus, (Day, 1875), piggy
- Pomadasys striatus, (Gilchrist & W. W. Thompson, 1908), striped grunter

Sparidae

- Argyrozona argyrozona, carpenter (endemic)
- Boopsoidea inornata, Castelnau, 1861, fransmadam (endemic)
- Cheimerius nufar, (Valenciennes, 1830), Santer
- Chrysoblephus cristiceps (Valenciennes, 1830 ), dageraad (endemic)
- Chrysoblephus gibbiceps Valenciennes, 1830, red stumpnose (endemic)
- Chrysoblephus laticeps (Valenciennes, 1830), roman (endemic)
- Chrysoblephus puniceus (Gilchrist & Thompson, 1908), slinger
- Cymatoceps nasutus (Castelnau, 1861), black musselcracker (endemic)
- Diplodus cervinus hottentotus (Lowe, 1838), zebra (endemic)
- Diplodus sargus capensis Linnaeus, 1758, blacktail
- Gymnocrotaphus curvidens, janbruin (endemic)
- Lithognathus lithognathus, white steenbras (endemic)
- Lithognathus mormyrus, sand steenbras
- Pachymetopon aeneum, blue hottentot (endemic)
- Pachymetopon blochii, hottentot (endemic)
- Pachymetopon grande, bronze bream
- Pagellus bellottii natalensis, red tjor-tjor
- Petrus rupestris, red steenbras (endemic)
- Polysteganus undulosus, seventy-four (endemic)
- Porcostoma dentata, dane (endemic)
- Pterogymnus laniarius, panga (endemic)
- Rhabdosargus globiceps, white stumpnose (endemic)
- Rhabdosargus holubi, Cape stumpnose (endemic)
- Rhabdosargus sarba, Natal stumpnose
- Sarpa salpa, Strepie
- Sparodon durbanensis, white musselcracker (endemic)
- Spondyliosoma emarginatum, steentjie (endemic)

Centracanthidae

- Spicara axillaris, windtoy (endemic)

Dichistidae

- Dichistius capensis, galjoen (endemic)
- Dichistius multifasciatus, banded galjoen

Parascorpididae

- Parascorpis typus, jutjaw (endemic)

Scorpididae

- Neoscorpis lithophilus, stonebream (endemic)

Monodactylidae

- Monodactylus falciformis, Cape moony

Mullidae

- Parupeneus rubescens, (Lacepède, 1801), blacksaddle goatfish

Sciaenidae

- Argyrosomus inodorus, silver kob
- Argyrosomus japonicus, dusky kob
- Atractoscion aequidens, geelbek
- Umbrina canariensis, baardman
- Umbrina ronchus, slender baardman

Pomacanthidae

- Pomacanthus rhomboides, old woman

Chaetodontidae

- Chaetodon blackburnii, brownburnie
- Chaetodon marleyi, doublesash butterflyfish (endemic)
- Heniochus acuminatus, coachman

Oplegnathidae

- Oplegnathus conwayi, Natal knifejaw (endemic)

Carangidae

- Caranx sexfasciatus, bigeye kingfish
- Decapterus macrosoma, slender scad
- Lichia amia, garrick
- Seriola lalandi, giant yellowtail
- Trachurus trachurus, Maasbanker

Coryphaenidae

- Coryphaena hippurus, dorado

Cheilodactylidae

- Cheilodactylus fasciatus, redfingers (endemic)
- Cheilodactylus pixi, barred fingerfin (endemic)
- Chirodactylus brachydactylus, twotone fingerfin (endemic)
- Chirodactylus grandis, bank steenbras (endemic)

Pomacentridae

- Abudefduf sordidus, spot damsel
- Chromis dasygenys, bluespotted chromis (endemic)

Labridae

- Coris caudimaucula, spottail coris
- Labriodes dimidiatus, blue streak cleaner wrasse

Mugilidae

- Liza dumerilii, groovy mullet
- Liza macrolepis, largescale mullet
- Liza richardsonii, southern mullet (endemic)
- Liza tricuspidens, striped mullet (endemic)
- Mugil cephalusi, flathead mullet
- Myxus capensis, freshwater mullet (endemic)
- Valamugil buchanani, bluetail mullet
- Valamugil seheli, bluespot mullet

Sphyraenidae

- Sphyraena jello, pickhandle barracuda

Congrogadidae

- Halidesmus scapularis, snakelet (endemic)

Champsodontidae

- Champsodon capensis, gaper

Bleniidae

- Omobranchus woodii, kappie blenny
- Chaloroderma ocellata, two-eyed blenny (endemic)
- Parablennius cornutus, horned blenny (endemic)
- Parablennius pilicornis, ringneck blenny
- Plagiotremus rhinorhynchus, twostripe blennny
- Plagiotremus tapeinosoma, piano blennny
- Scartella emarginata, maned blenny
- Xiphasia setifer, snakeblenny

Trypterygiidae

- Trypterygiidae, gen. nov. (new genus & species)
- Cremnochorites capensis, Cape triplefin (endemic)

Clinidae

- Blennioclinus brachycephalus, lace klipfish (endemic)
- Blennioclinus stella, silverbubble klipfish (endemic)
- Blennophis striatus, striped klipfish (endemic)
- Cirrhibarbis capensis, barbelled klipfish (endemic)
- Climacoporus navalis, fleet klipfish (endemic)
- Clinus acuminatus, sad klipfish (endemic)
- Clinus agilis, agile klipfish (endemic)
- Clinus berrisfordi, Onrust klipfish (endemic)
- Clinus cottoides, bluntnose klipfish (endemic)
- Clinus nematopterus, Chinese klipfish (endemic)
- Clinus robustus, robust klipfish (endemic)
- Clinus superciliosus, super klipfish (endemic)
- Clinus taurus, bull klipfish (endemic)
- Clinus venustris, speckled klipfish (endemic)
- Pavoclinus graminis, grass klipfish (endemic)
- Pavoclinus laurentii, rippled klipfish (endemic)
- Pavoclinus pavo, peacock klipfish (endemic)
- Pavoclinus profundus, deepwater klipfish (endemic)
- Xenopoclinus kochi, platanna klipfish (endemic)
- Xenopoclinus leprosus, leprous platanna-klipfish (endemic)

Ammodytidae

- Gymnammodytes capensis, Cape sandlance (endemic)

Callionymidae

- Paracallionymus costatus, ladder dragonet (endemic)

Gobiidae

- Caffrogobius agulhensis, Agulhas goby (endemic)
- Caffrogobius caffer, banded goby (endemic)
- Caffrogobius multifasciatus, prison goby (endemic)
- Caffrogobius natalensis, baldy (endemic)
- Caffrogobius nudiceps, barehead goby
- Caffrogobius saldanha, commafin goby (endemic)
- Glossogobius callidus, river goby
- Glossogobius giuris, tank goby
- Psammogobius knysnaensis, Knysna sandgoby (endemic)
- Redigobius dewaali, checked goby

Zanclidae

- Zanclus canescens, Moorish idol

Gempylidae

- Thyrsites atun, snoek

Trichiuridae

- Lepidopus caudatus, buttersnoek

Scombridae

- Scomber japonicus, mackerel

Stromatidae

- Centrolophus niger, black ruff

Bothidae

- Arnoglossus capensis, Cape flounder (endemic)

Cynoglossidae

- Cynoglossus capensis, sand tongue fish (endemic)
- Cynoglossus zanzibarensis, redspotted tongue fish

Soleidae

- Austroglossus pectoralis, East Cape sole (endemic)
- Heteromycteris capensis, Cape sole (endemic)
- Monochirus ocellatus, foureye sole
- Solea bleekeri, blackhand sole (endemic)
- Solea fulvomarginata, lemon sole (endemic)
- Synaptura marginata, shallow-water sole
- Synapturichthys kleini, lace sole

Monacanthidae

- Aluterus monoceros, unicorn leatherjacket

Ostraciidae

- Lactoria cornuta, longhorn cowfish
- Tetrosomus concatenatus, triangular boxfish

Tetraodontidae

- Amblyrhynchotes honckenii, evileye blaasop
- Arothron hispidus, whitespotted blaasop
- Arothron immaculatus, blackedged blaasop

Diodontidae

- Diodon hystrix, porcupinefish
- Lophodiodon calori, fourbar porcupinefish

Molidae

- Mola mola, ocean sunfish

==== Endemism ====
The MPA is in the warm temperate Agulhas inshore marine bioregion to the east of Cape Point which extends eastwards to the Mbashe River. There are a large proportion of species endemic to South Africa along this coastline.

== Slipways and harbours in the MPA ==
There is a small concrete slipway at the Storm's River Mouth, which is moderately protected from swell. The Storms River mouth is navigable for small craft for some distance, and there are places where a boat can moor in the gorge that are accessible by footpath from the mouth.

== See also ==
Marine protected areas of South Africa

- List of protected areas of South Africa
- Marine protected areas of South Africa – Protected areas of coastline or ocean in the EEZ of South Africa
