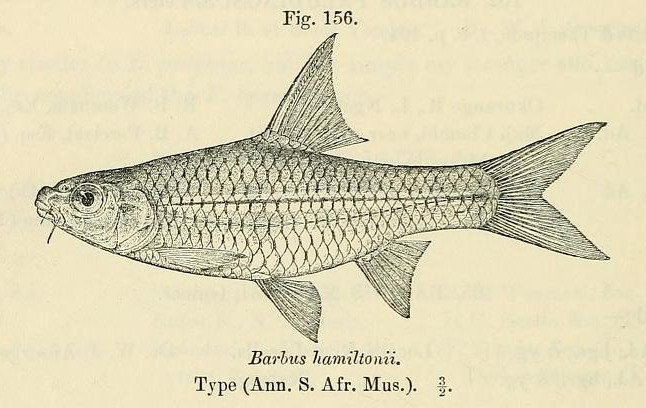

Conservation status
- Least Concern (IUCN 3.1)

Scientific classification
- Kingdom: Animalia
- Phylum: Chordata
- Class: Actinopterygii
- Order: Cypriniformes
- Family: Cyprinidae
- Subfamily: Smiliogastrinae
- Genus: Enteromius
- Species: E. afrohamiltoni

Binomial name
- Enteromius afrohamiltoni Crass, 1960

Synonyms
- Barbus afrohamiltoni Crass, 1960; Barbus hamiltoni Gilchrist & Thompson, 1913

= Hamilton's barb =

Species of fish

Hamilton's barb (Enteromius afrohamiltoni), also known as the plump barb, is a species of ray-finned fish in the genus Enteromius.

== Etymology ==
The fish is named in honor of Lt.-Col. J. Stevenson Hamilton, a warden at Kruger National Park, who collected the type specimen.

== Footnotes ==
- Froese, Rainer; Pauly, Daniel (eds.). "Enteromius afrohamiltoni". FishBase.
