= Clinoporus =

Conservation status
- Least Concern (IUCN 3.1)

Scientific classification
- Kingdom: Animalia
- Phylum: Chordata
- Class: Actinopterygii
- Order: Blenniiformes
- Family: Clinidae
- Genus: Clinoporus; Barnard, 1927
- Species: C. biporosus

Binomial name
- Clinoporus biporosus (Gilchrist & W. W. Thompson, 1908)

Synonyms
- Clinus biporosus Gilchrist & W. W. Thompson, 1908

Genus of fishes

Clinoporus biporosus, the ladder klipfish, is a species of clinid found in subtropical waters of the Atlantic Ocean around the South African coast. It occurs in the subtidal zone down to a depth of 30 metres (98 ft). This species can reach a maximum length of 13 centimetres (5.1 in) TL. It is currently the only known member of the genus Clinoporus.

== Description ==
- Fins: Dorsal fin spines 38 to 41, rays 2 to 3; Anal fin spines 2, rays 27 to 29; Pectoral fin rays 12 to 13; Ventral fin spines 1, rays 3.
- Vertebrae 17+(32 to 35).
- Body depth 6.25 to 6.85 in Standard length.
- Head length 4.5 to 6.25 in Standard length.
- Eye 2.75 to 4.25 diameters in head length.
- Caudal peduncle 23 to 26% head length, depth 28.5 to 31% head length.

Shape:

The body is elongate and moderately compressed. The eyes are prominent, and slightly larger than the snout, at twice the interorbital width. The head profile is slightly convex with a ridge along the centreline of the snout. The sensory pores are large and conspicuous. There are no tentacles above the eyes. The cirri on the front nostrils are small and flap-like. The cleft of the mouth is slightly oblique, with thick lips. The caudal peduncle is short. The dorsal fin is low and even, without a notch in the membrane between third and fourth dorsal spines, and without cirri. The 1st spine is shortest with succeeding spines increasing in length, and the dorsal rays are shorter than the spines. The 3rd ventral ray is very small. The lateral line has large pores opening above and below throughout its length.

Colour:

The colour is a uniform deep crimson, or brownish to yellowish brown.

Size:

Attains 13 centimetres (5.1 in).

== Distribution ==
Rare, mainly infratidal. Saldanha Bay to False Bay.

== Habitat ==
Amongst rocks at about low water mark, extending down to 30m.

== Etymology ==
The generic name Clinoporus refers to the resemblance of the species to the fishes in the genus Clinus and to the double line of pores along its lateral line, while the specific name also refers to these pores.
