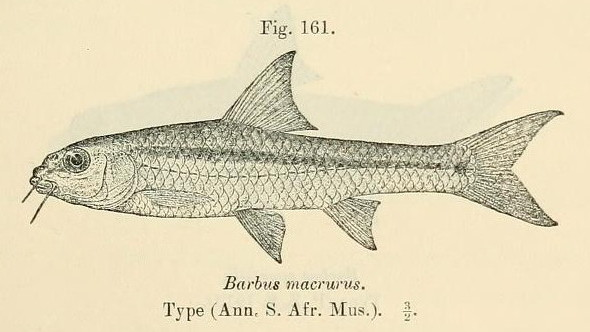

Conservation status
- Least Concern (IUCN 3.1)

Scientific classification
- Domain: Eukaryota
- Kingdom: Animalia
- Phylum: Chordata
- Class: Actinopterygii
- Order: Cypriniformes
- Family: Cyprinidae
- Subfamily: Smiliogastrinae
- Genus: Enteromius
- Species: E. unitaeniatus

Binomial name
- Enteromius unitaeniatus (Günther, 1866)

Synonyms
- Barbus unitaeniatus Günther, 1866; Barbodes unitaeniatus (Günther, 1866); Barbus incomoides Nichols & Boulton, 1927; Barbus inermoides Nichols & Boulton, 1927; Barbus labialis Gilchrist & Thompson, 1913; Barbus macrurus Gilchrist & Thompson, 1913; Barbus tristigmaturus Fowler, 1934; Puntius unitaeniatus (Günther, 1866); Puntius vittatus Steindachner, 1866

= Slender barb =

Species of fish

The slender barb or longbeard barb (Enteromius unitaeniatus) is a species of ray-finned fish in the genus Enteromius which has a wide distribution from the Democratic Republic of the Congo to South Africa.

== Footnotes ==
- Froese, Rainer; Pauly, Daniel (eds.). "Enteromius unitaeniatus". FishBase.
