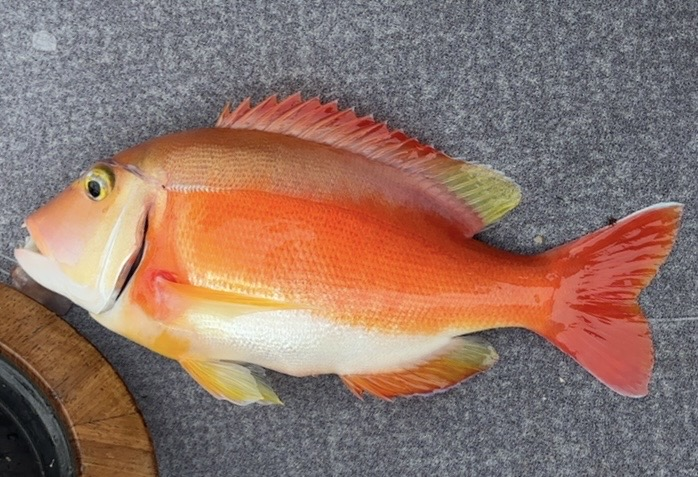

Conservation status
- Least Concern (IUCN 3.1)

Scientific classification
- Kingdom: Animalia
- Phylum: Chordata
- Class: Actinopterygii
- Order: Acanthuriformes
- Family: Sparidae
- Genus: Porcostoma; J. L. B. Smith, 1938
- Species: P. dentata

Binomial name
- Porcostoma dentata (Gilchrist & W. W. Thompson, 1908)

Synonyms
- Chrysophrys dentatus Gilchrist & Thompson, 1908

= Dane seabream =

Species of fishes

The Dane Seabream (Porcostoma dentata), also known as the Dane, is a species of marine ray-finned fish belonging to the family Sparidae, which includes the seabreams and porgies. The Dane Seabream is the only species in the monospecific genus Porcostoma. This species is endemic to the southwestern Indian Ocean off the coast of Southern Africa.

== Taxonomy ==
The Dane seabream was first formally described as Chrysophrys dentatus by the ichthyologists John Dow Fisher Gilchrist, a Scot, and William Wardlaw Thompson, a South African, with its type locality given as Natal. In 1938 James Leonard Brierley Smith reclassified this species in the monospecific genus Porcostoma. This taxon is placed in the family Sparidae within the order Spariformes by the 5th edition of Fishes of the World. Some authorities classify this genus in the subfamily Sparinae, but the 5th edition of Fishes of the World does not recognise subfamilies within the Sparidae.

== Etymology ==
The Dane seabream has the genus name Porcostoma which is a combination of Porcus, meaning "pig", with stoma meaning "mouth". This is thought to refer to the canine-like teeth that project out of the closed mouth like the tusks of a boar. The specific name, dentata, means "toothed", also referring to the visible teeth when the mouth is closed.

== Description ==
The Dane seabream has scales between the eyes and on the bases of the soft rayed parts of the dorsal and anal fins. There is s distinctive black streak along the first few scales of the lateral line. The dorsal fin is supported by 13 spines and 10 or11 soft rays while there are 3 spines and 8 or 9 soft rays in the anal fin. The pectoral fins have 17 or 18 fin rays. The body is plump and ovoid, its standard length is 2.5 times its depth. The dorsal profile of the head is straight or concave from the snout to the nape and then gently convex to the base of the dorsal fin. Both the lobes of the caudal fin are rounded. The overall colour of the body is red, paler below, with some individuals showing streaks along the scale rows. There is a dark bar between the eyes and there is a dark streak along the front of the lateral line. The rears parts of the dorsal and anal fins, as well as the pectoral and pelvic fins are tinged golden. The juveniles are yellow and have 2 black blotches on lateral line. This species has a maximum total length of 36 cm (14 in), although 25 cm (9.8 in) is more typical.

== Distribution and habitat ==
The Dane seabream is endemic to the southwestern Indian Ocean along the southeastern coast of Africa between Beira, Mozambique and Tsitsikamma in the Western Cape. This species occurs on reefs, especially deeper reefs in the vicinity of pinnacles and drop offs at depths between 10 and 120 m (33 and 394 ft).

== Biology ==
The Dane seabream is predatory species, with the adults feeding on a variety of animals including crinoids, mantis shrimps, polychaetes, crabs and hermit crabs. Sexual maturity is reached around a fork length of 15 cm (5.9 in) and spawning takes place off KwaZulu-Natal in the Spring. There are reports of this species gathering in schools but also of fish living singly.

== Fisheries ==
The Dane seabream is commonly caught in ski boat fisheries of Mozambique and eastern South Africa but it is too small to be of interest to commercial fisheries. It is often not sold but is given to boat crews for their own consumption. Even recreational anglers frequently return Dane seabreams rather than take them.
