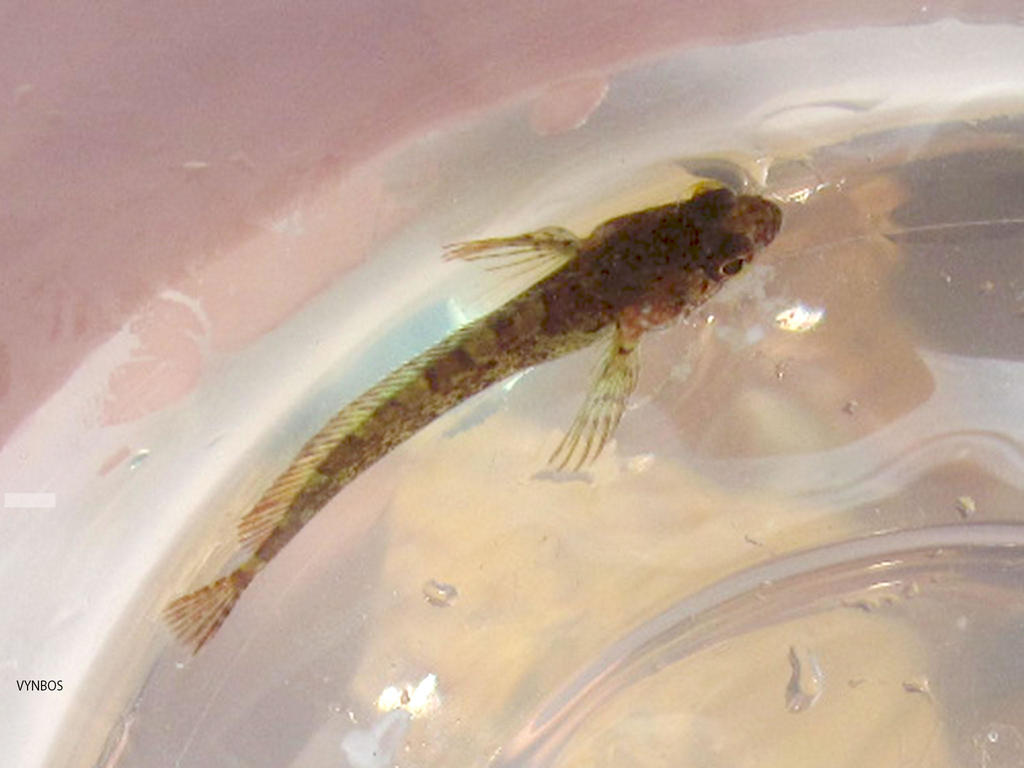
- Clinus acuminatus

Scientific classification
- Kingdom: Animalia
- Phylum: Chordata
- Class: Actinopterygii
- Order: Blenniiformes
- Family: Clinidae
- Genus: Clinus; G. Cuvier, 1816

Type species
- Blennius acuminatus Bloch & J. G. Schneider, 1801

Synonyms
- Blenniomimus J. L. B. Smith, 1946; Caboclinus J. L. B. Smith, 1966; Gynutoclinus J. L. B. Smith, 1946; Ophthalmolophus T. N. Gill, 1860

= Clinus =

Genus of fishes

Clinus is a genus of clinids found in the southeastern Atlantic and western Indian Ocean.

== Species ==
There are currently 19 recognized species in this genus on FishBase and 22 on WoRMS:

- Clinus acuminatus (Bloch & J. G. Schneider, 1801) (Sad klipfish)
- Clinus agilis J. L. B. Smith, 1931 (Agile klipfish)
- Clinus arborescens Gilchrist & W. W. Thompson, 1908
- Clinus berrisfordi M. L. Penrith, 1967 (Onrust klipfish)
- Clinus brevicristatus Gilchrist & W. W. Thompson, 1908 (Cape klipfish)
- Clinus cottoides Valenciennes, 1836 (Bluntnose klipfish)
- Clinus exasperatus Holleman, von der Heyden & Zsilavecz, 2012
- Clinus helenae (J. L. B. Smith, 1946) (Helen's klipfish)
- Clinus heterodon Valenciennes, 1836 (Westcoast klipfish)
- Clinus latipennis Valenciennes, 1836 (False Bay klipfish)
- Clinus musaicus Holleman, von der Heyden & Zsilavecz, 2012
- Clinus nematopterus Günther, 1861 (Chinese klipfish)
- Clinus robustus Gilchrist & W. W. Thompson, 1908 (Robust klipfish)
- Clinus rotundifrons Barnard, 1937 (Kelp klipfish)
- Clinus spatulatus B. A. Bennett, 1983 (Bot River klipfish)
- Clinus superciliosus (Linnaeus, 1758) (Highfin or Super klipfish)
- Clinus taurus Gilchrist & W. W. Thompson, 1908 (Bull klipfish)
- Clinus venustris Gilchrist & W. W. Thompson, 1908 (Speckled klipfish)
- Clinus woodi (J. L. B. Smith, 1946) (Oldman klipfish)

Names brought to synonymy

- Clinus elegans Valenciennes, 1836 or Clinus geniguttatus Valenciennes, 1836, synonyms for Calliclinus geniguttatus
