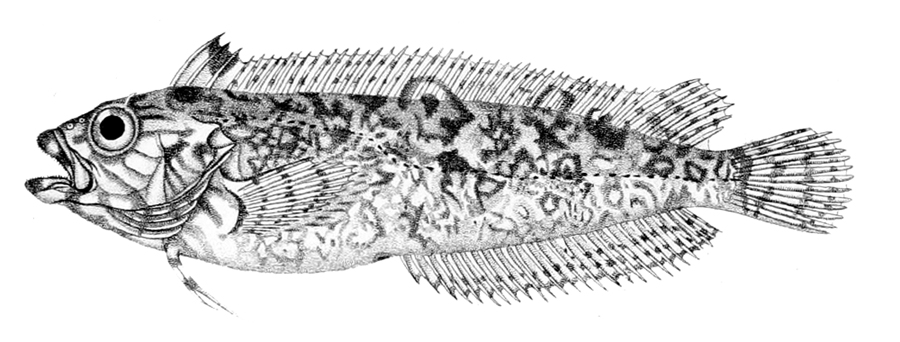

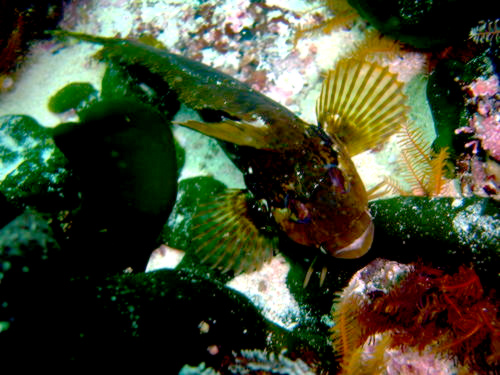

Conservation status
- Least Concern (IUCN 3.1)

Scientific classification
- Kingdom: Animalia
- Phylum: Chordata
- Class: Actinopterygii
- Order: Blenniiformes
- Family: Clinidae
- Genus: Clinus
- Species: C. superciliosus

Binomial name
- Clinus superciliosus (Linnaeus, 1758)

Synonyms
- Blennius superciliosus Linnaeus, 1758; Caboclinus superciliosus (Linnaeus, 1758); Blennius spadiceus Bloch & J. G. Schneider, 1801; Clinus ornatus Gilchrist & W. W. Thompson, 1908

= Clinus superciliosus =

Species of fish endemic to Southern Africa

Clinus superciliosus, the Super klipfish or Highfin klipfish, is a species of clinid that occurs in subtropical waters of the Atlantic Ocean from northern Namibia to the Kei River in South Africa where it can be found in the subtidal and intertidal zones. This species can reach a maximum length of 30 centimetres (12 in) TL. This species feeds on benthic crustaceans including amphipods, isopods and crabs; sea urchins; gastropods; polychaete worms and other fishes.

== Description ==
Size up to 30 cm, robust and slightly compressed. Males have tall dorsal crest comprising first three spines followed by deep notch in the membrane and the rest of the dorsal fin,. Females have a lower more rounded crest. The head is large and pointed, with a large mouth and thick lips. Prominent cirri above the eyes, which may be barely branched or quite bushy in mature adults. Colour highly variable, from white through yellow, orange, red, and brown to dark green. A dark mark on the upper part of the operculum is common. Body patterning varies with a few distinct patterns. No pattern, with near uniform body colour; a broad white band from behind the eye, across the opercle, tapering to the caudal fin, which may be continuous or broken, with the rest of the body roughly uniform in colour; or highly mottled with vertical and horizontal bars and bands. Head pattern variable, ranging from broad oblique bars to a complex reticulated pattern. Eyes have broad radiating bars in body colour, red or yellow iris. Pectoral fins in body colour with translucent membrane.

== Distribution and habitat ==
Namibia to beyond East London. Rock pools to at least 50m depth. Habitat preference roughly follows colouration, but they will also be found on a contrasting background. Pale animals seem to prefer sand, light green on Caulerpa beds, dark green on Codium and red on red algae.

== Taxonomy ==
Some authors regard Clinus superciliosus as a species complex consisting of the current species and C. arborescens and C. ornatus, as well as the two species described in 2012 C. exasperatus and C. musaicus. Fishbase does not recognise C. ornatus, but the Catalog of Fishes does.
