= Fucomimus =

Conservation status
- Least Concern (IUCN 3.1)

Scientific classification
- Kingdom: Animalia
- Phylum: Chordata
- Class: Actinopterygii
- Order: Blenniiformes
- Family: Clinidae
- Genus: Fucomimus; J. L. B. Smith, 1946
- Species: F. mus

Binomial name
- Fucomimus mus (Gilchrist & W. W. Thompson, 1908)

Synonyms
- Clinus mus Gilchrist & W. W. Thompson, 1908; Pavolinus mus (Gilchrist & W. W. Thompson, 1908)

Species of fish

Fucomimus mus, the mousey klipfish, is a species of clinid found in subtropical waters of the Atlantic Ocean along the South African coast where it occurs in tide pools. This species can reach a maximum length of 10 centimetres (3.9 in) TL. This species feeds on benthic crustaceans including amphipods, isopods and copepods, and gastropods.
