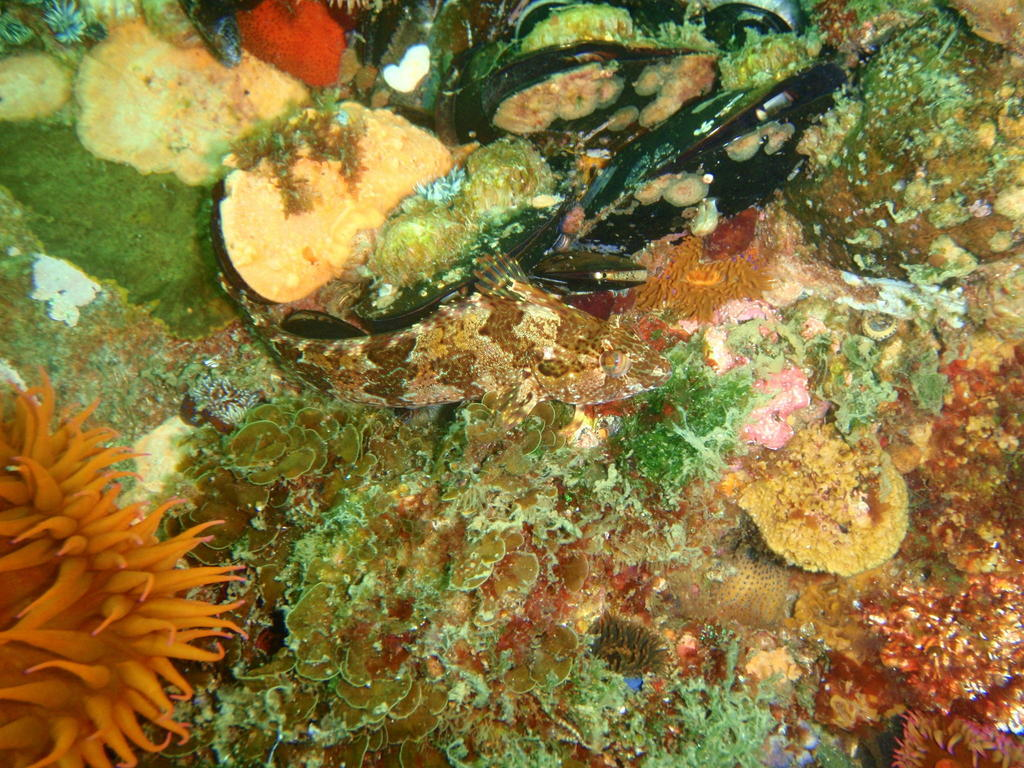

Conservation status
- Least Concern (IUCN 3.1)

Scientific classification
- Kingdom: Animalia
- Phylum: Chordata
- Class: Actinopterygii
- Order: Blenniiformes
- Family: Clinidae
- Genus: Clinus
- Species: C. arborescens

Binomial name
- Clinus arborescens Gilchrist & W. W. Thompson, 1908

Synonyms
- Clinus superciliosus arborescens Gilchrist & W. W. Thompson, 1908

= Clinus arborescens =

Species of fish

Clinus arborescens is a species of clinid that occurs in temperate waters of the Indian Ocean around South Africa. This species can reach a length of 22 centimetres (8.7 in) SL. It is a demersal species, found in beds of Rhodophyta where it feeds on small molluscs.

== Description ==
Body is slightly compressed, with a wedge-shaped snout and acute profile angle. Like many others of the clinidae family, it has a tentacle above each eye. The first three dorsal spines are elevated to form a crest, with a notch in the membrane between the third and fourth spine. The dorsal spines are topped with clusters of fine cirri. The inner ray of the pelvic fin is thin and close to second ray, third is half length of second ray.

Coloration can vary between brown, red, and green, with 2 - 4 diffuse saddles. One light stripe radiates from the eye, past the pectoral fin, and towards the caudal peduncle, there is an ocellate spot on the edge of the operculum, right above the light stripe. Eye is slightly behind edge of lips.

== Diagnostics ==
Dorsal fin: XXXVI - XLI spines, 4 - 7 soft rays (XXXVIII - XXXIX, 5 - 6). Anal fin: II spines, 25 - 28. Pectoral fin: 13 - 15 rays. Pelvic fins: I, 3. Vertebrae 17-19 (18) + 32-34. Lateral line scales 37-43 + 27-32 (39 or 40 + 28-32, mode 40 + 30). Head length 3.2-4.1 [3.7] in SL. Eye diameter 2.7-5.6, maxilla 2.0-2.9 [2.4], snout 3.0-4.6 [3.7] in HL. Dorsal-fin origin 1.3-2.0 [1.6] in HL. Dorsal fin height 8.0-14.3 [10.9] in SL.

== Common Names ==
Autumn Klipvis; Autumn Klipfish.

== Images ==
Representative images of this species can be found on the iNaturalist page for C. arborescens.

== Reproduction ==
Just as all members of the Clinidae family, it is viviparous.
