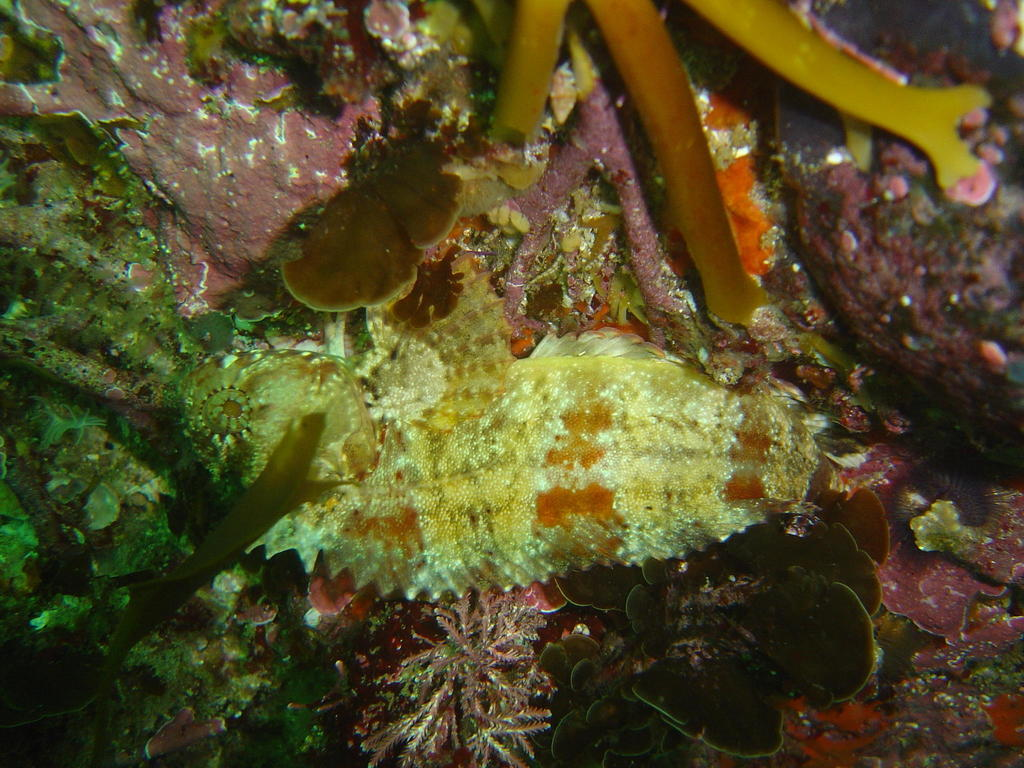

Conservation status
- Least Concern (IUCN 3.1)

Scientific classification
- Kingdom: Animalia
- Phylum: Chordata
- Class: Actinopterygii
- Order: Blenniiformes
- Family: Clinidae
- Genus: Clinus
- Species: C. taurus

Binomial name
- Clinus taurus Gilchrist & W. W. Thompson, 1908

Synonyms
- Blenniominus taurus (Gilchrist & W. W. Thompson, 1908)

= Clinus taurus =

Species of fish

Clinus taurus, the bull klipfish, is a species of clinid that occurs in subtropical waters of the Atlantic Ocean from Namibia to South Africa where it occurs in the tidal and subtidal zones. This species can reach a maximum length of 23 centimetres (9.1 in) TL.
