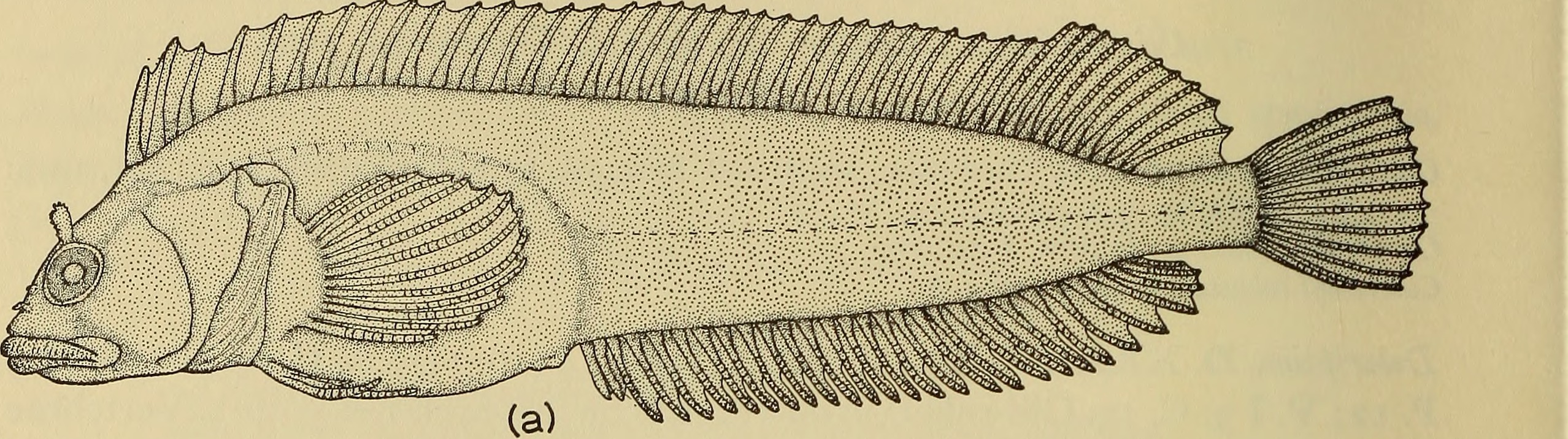

Conservation status
- Least Concern (IUCN 3.1)

Scientific classification
- Kingdom: Animalia
- Phylum: Chordata
- Class: Actinopterygii
- Order: Blenniiformes
- Family: Clinidae
- Genus: Clinus
- Species: C. robustus

Binomial name
- Clinus robustus Gilchrist & W. W. Thompson, 1908

= Clinus robustus =

Species of fish

Clinus robustus, the robust klipfish, is a species of clinid that occurs in subtropical waters of the Atlantic Ocean around South Africa where it can be found in the subtidal zone in areas with plentiful seaweed growth. This species can reach a maximum length of 50 centimetres (20 in) TL.

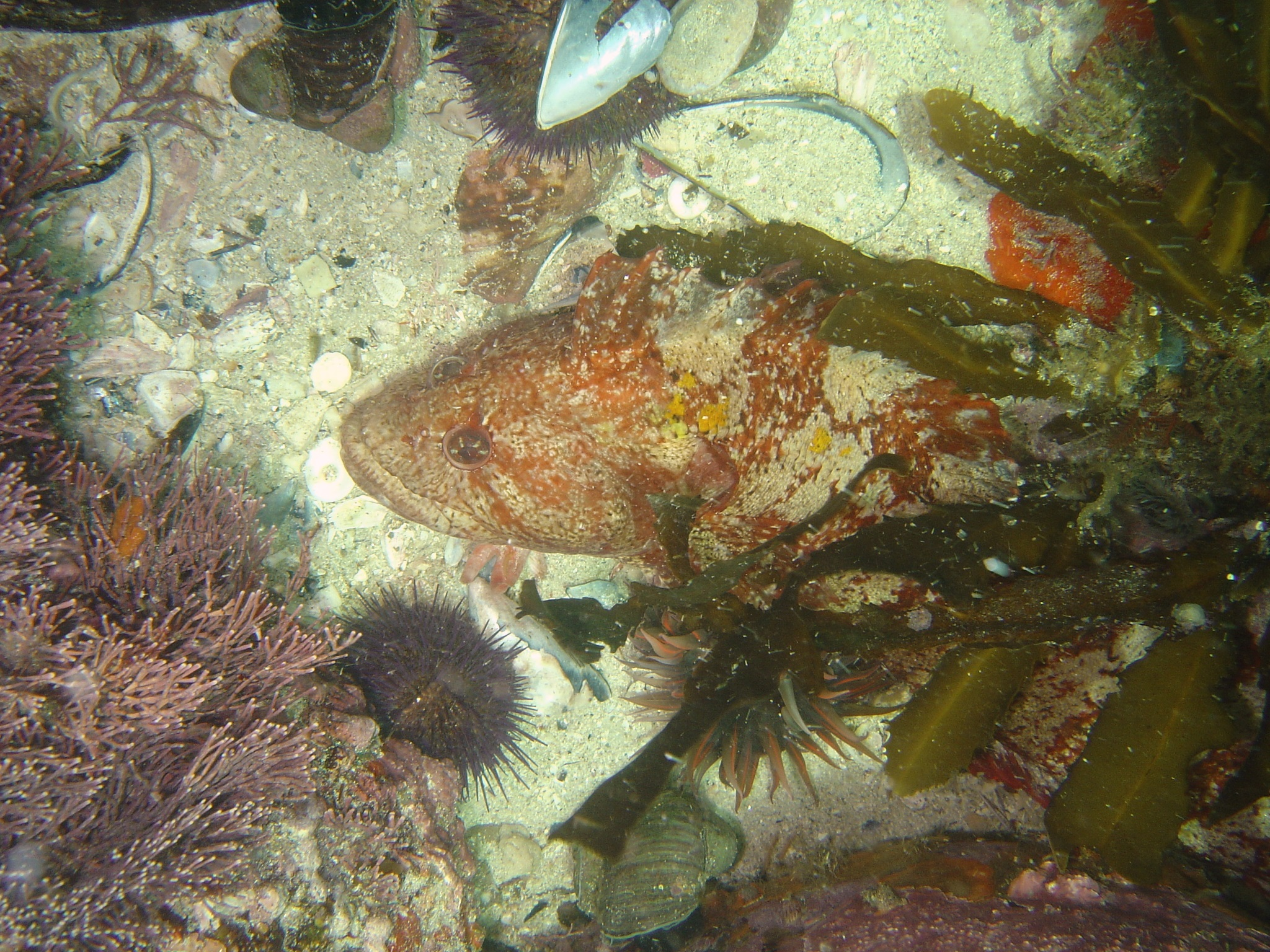
Robust klipfish at Castle Rocks, Cape Peninsula
