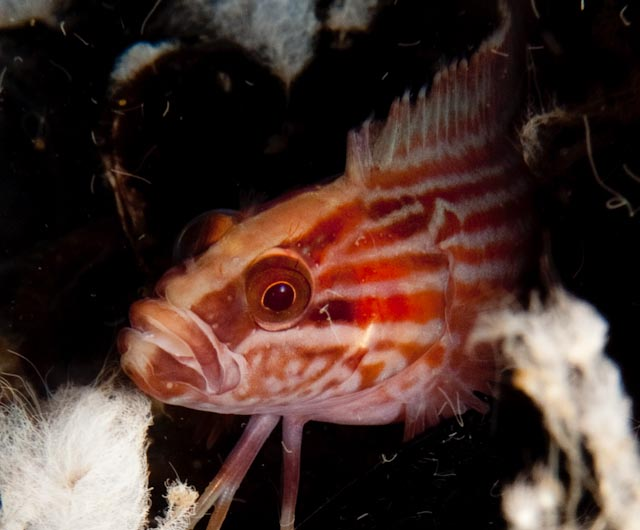

Conservation status
- Least Concern (IUCN 3.1)

Scientific classification
- Kingdom: Animalia
- Phylum: Chordata
- Class: Actinopterygii
- Order: Blenniiformes
- Family: Clinidae
- Genus: Blennophis
- Species: B. striatus

Binomial name
- Blennophis striatus (Gilchrist & W. W. Thompson, 1908)

Synonyms
- Clinus striatus Gilchrist & W. W. Thompson, 1908

= Blennophis striatus =

Species of fish

Blennophis striatus, the striped klipfish, is a species of clinid found in the subtropical waters of the Atlantic Ocean from Saldanha Bay to East London, South Africa where it can be found in the subtidal zone as well as inhabiting tidepools. This species can reach a maximum length of 17.5 centimetres (6.9 in) TL.

== Description ==
- Fins: Dorsal fin spines 40 to 45, rays 2 to 4; Anal fin spines 2, rays 28 to 31; Pectoral fin rays 12 to 13; Ventral fin spines 1, rays 2 to 3.
- Gill rakers (2 to 3)+(7 to 8).
- Vertebrae 17+(34 to 35).
- Lateral line with about 22 double pores in front part.
- Body depth 6 to 8.25 in standard length.
- Head length 4.5 to 5.25 in standard length.
- Eye 3.5 to 5 diameters in head length.
- Caudal peduncle 10 to 20% head length, depth 23 to 27% head length.

Shape: Body elongate, robust and fairly cylindrical, with the lateral line strongly marked on the curve. There is a tentacle over each eye, consisting of a short, flat, fleshy stalk with a short fringe of fine cirri at the end. The head is pointed, with a bluntly wedge-shaped snout and the space between the eyes is convex. The mouth opening is small, with the lower jaw slightly longer than upper and thick lips. The dorsal fin has no crest. Cirri on the front nostrils are elongate, spatulate, and slightly lobed ventrally.

Colour:

Reddish brown, or green, and the body is covered with longitudinal parallel lines of alternate pinkish brown and white, from the eye and from behind the pectoral fins to the caudal fin. There is a white band from the dorsal fin between the eyes to the snout, and a brown band from the eyes to the snout, extending onto the lower lip. The outer edge of the dorsal and analdins and the tip of the caudal fin are white. The inner half of the ventral fins is white and the outer part is reddish brown.

There is a dark ocellus with pale edge on the shoulder and two dark lines radiating from the eye across the cheek. Juveniles are whitish with dark longitudinal stripes.

Size:

Attains 17.5 cm

== Distribution ==
Saldanha Bay to East London.

== Habitat ==
Tide pools and subtidally.
