= Clinus brevicristatus =

Conservation status
- Least Concern (IUCN 3.1)

Scientific classification
- Kingdom: Animalia
- Phylum: Chordata
- Class: Actinopterygii
- Order: Blenniiformes
- Suborder: Blennioidei
- Family: Clinidae
- Genus: Clinus
- Species: C. brevicristatus

Binomial name
- Clinus brevicristatus Gilchrist & W. W. Thompson, 1908

Species of fish

Clinus brevicristatus, the Cape klipfish, is a species of clinid that occurs in subtropical waters of the Atlantic Ocean around South Africa where it prefers habitats with plentiful growth of seaweed. This species can reach a maximum length of 12 centimetres (4.7 in) TL.

== Description ==
The body is slightly compressed. The head is short with a shallow transverse depression behind the eyes, the snout is obtuse and slightly pointed with fairly thin lips. There is a prominent and well developed tentacle above the top rear of each eye formed by a broad flat stalk and round, flattened tip ending in several simple branches; the prominent cirri on the front nostrils are elongate, flat, and narrow, with slightly indented margin. The first 3 dorsal spines form a low crest and are separated from the rest of the fin by a deep notch, with the membrane connected to the base of the 4th spine. The soft rays are higher than the spines. All dorsal spines have cirri at their tips, the front spines each carry a group of 4 to 6 short cirri followed by 2-3 cirri per spine and then 1 cirrus each for those furthest back. Pectoral fin rounded. The ventral 3rd rays are very small. Caudal peduncle short. The caudal fin is rounded.

This fish is more robust than equally sized individuals of C. superciliosus or C. venustris, with a much wider head. The very prominent supraorbital tentacles and cirrus on anterior nostril, and the shape of the dorsal fin are diagnostic. The dorsal fin has a slight crest formed by the first three spines, a notch of variable depth, but generally present, and the membrane between the subsequent few spines is also somewhat notched. The cirri at the ends of the dorsal spines are usually clearly visible. The raised dorsal soft rays are not easily visible in live specimens, but are characteristic when taken into account with the notches on the first few dorsal spines. This combination, apart from differing colour, is what distinguishes this species from C. agilis, which has a lower crest, less notching, and fewer dorsal soft rays. Although not always readily visible, the membrane of the dorsal soft rays is usually translucent and has a very characteristic line running vertically from the top of the highest ray.

Colour is variable. Ground colour usually light grey or pale yellow. There may be are about seven irregular bars across the body. These can be various shades of green, brown, or deep red, extending to the edges of the dorsal and anal fins, and between these bars there are irregular vermilion to brick-red bands from the base of the dorsal fin, across the lateral line but not reaching the abdominal margin. Tips of dorsal fins are a shiny golden colour. There is a row of irregular white patches below lateral line from the pectoral fin to the base of the caudal fin, an irregular white band from the lower edge of the eye to the edge of the opercle and a white patch on the throat below the opercle. The belly is silvery to whitish. The bases of the pectoral fins are dark brown with a white patch. The pectoral and caudal fins are semi-transparent light greenish-yellow with rows of dark spots along the rays, or finely barred with dark brown, and a small white spot on the base of the caudal fin. The anal fin is greenish yellow between the dark bars. The soft dorsal fin is transparent over about 2/3 of its extent. The ventral fins are pale greenish-yellow with dark spots or barred with brown. Head grey or pink or a mottled light brown and the top of the head is black. The eyes have dark pupils, a lighter coloured iris, there are a few bands of yellow and brown radiating back and down, and the remaining quarter is uniform pale brown. Tentacles and nostril cirri pale yellow.

Other colorations have been reported.

There is a marked similarity in appearance between Clinus brevicristatus and Clinus agilis both in body form and colour pattern The difference taxonomically is the higher dorsal spine count in Clinus brevicristatus, while visually the first three dorsal spines are elevated into a small crest, with a deep notch between the 3rd and 4th dorsal spine. The easiest differentiation is that in Clinus brevicristatus the dorsal fin generally has many translucent patches. The habitat also differs, with Clinus brevicristatus preferring walls, while Clinus agilis prefers the bottom near sand.

Attains 12 cm.

=== Diagnostics ===
The dorsal fin has 33 to 36 spines, followed by 4 to 7 rays. The anal fin has 2 spines and 21 to 24 rays. The pectoral fin has 12 to 14 rays, and the ventral fin has 1 spine and 3 rays. There are 1 to 2 gill rakers on the upper limb of the first gill arch and 3 to 4 on the lower limb. There are 17 to 18 abdominal vertebrae and 27 to 31 caudal vertebrae. The lateral line has 20 to 25 vertical pairs of pores. There are 4.5 to 5 times the body depth in the standard length, and 3.75 to 4.75 times the head length in the standard length. The head length is from 2.75 to 3.25 times the eye diameter. The length of the caudal peduncle is 21% to 34.5% of the head length, and its depth is 21% to 28% of the head length head length.

== Taxonomy ==
=== Synonyms ===
- Petraites brevicristatus Smith, 1946
- Clinus (Clinus) brevicristatus Penrith, 1969

=== Common names ===
- Cape klipfish.
- Low-crested klipfish.

=== Etymology ===
The Latin word 'brevicristatus' (brevi, from brevis) means short, and cristatus (crested, also a Latin word) refers to the low dorsal fin crest.

== Distribution and habitat ==
This species ranges from Lambert's Bay to False Bay, almost exclusively in weed-beds. The yellowish colour form has been found on walls covered with yellow hydroids of various species, especially the more bushy ones. The fish does not lie prominently on the outer branches, nor in the spaces formed by the planar hydroid Sertularella arbuscula, but rather underneath it. It relies on camouflage and does not readily flee.

== Reproduction ==
Viviparous.
