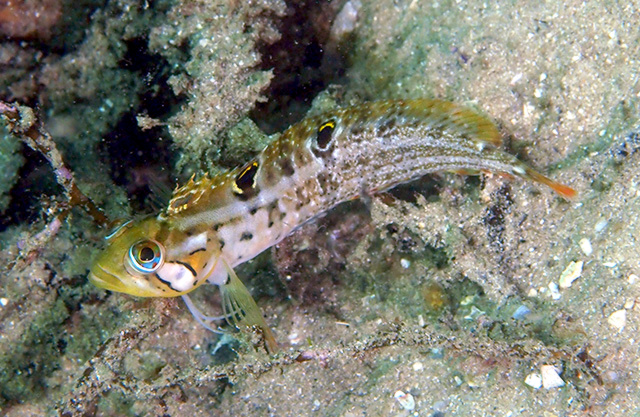

Conservation status
- Least Concern (IUCN 3.1)

Scientific classification
- Kingdom: Animalia
- Phylum: Chordata
- Class: Actinopterygii
- Order: Blenniiformes
- Family: Clinidae
- Genus: Clinus
- Species: C. venustris

Binomial name
- Clinus venustris Gilchrist & W. W. Thompson, 1908

Synonyms
- Ophthalmolophus venustris (Gilchrist & W. W. Thompson, 1908)

= Clinus venustris =

Species of fish

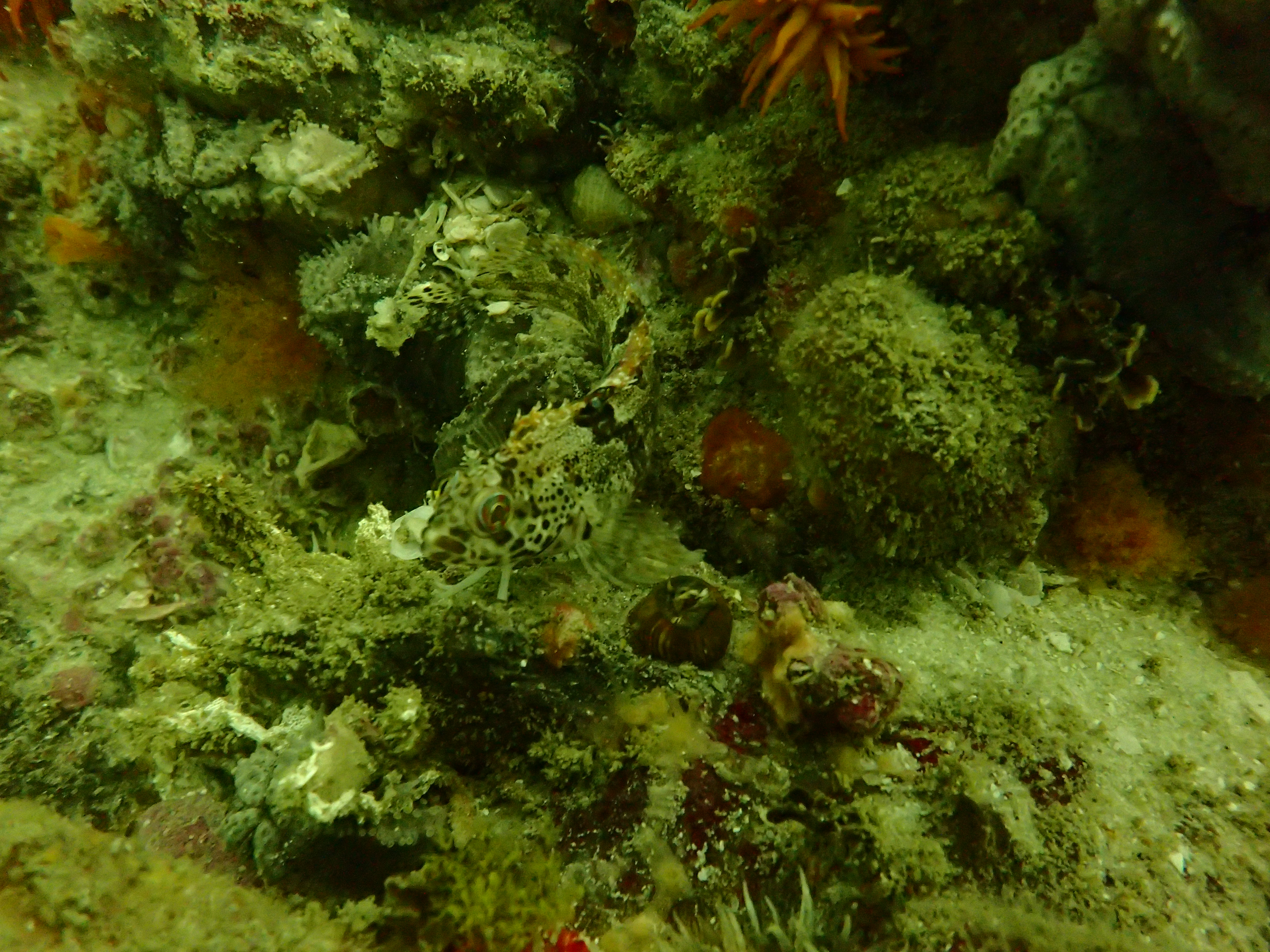
Speckled klipfish at Muizenberg trawler wreck

Clinus venustris, the speckled klipfish, is a species of clinid that occurs in subtropical waters of the Atlantic Ocean from Namibia to South Africa where it is found in the subtidal zone as well as being a denizen of tide pools. This species can reach a maximum length of 12 centimetres (4.7 in) TL. and feeds primarily on amphipods, isopods, mysids, and echinoderms.

== Description ==
The body is small, slender and moderately compressed. Head profile is slightly convex with the forehead sloping rather steeply to large prominent eyes, with a flat space between the eyes. The short snout is slightly sharp to bluntly rounded and the cleft of the mouth is oblique with moderately thick lips. There is a well-developed tentacle above and behind each eye, consisting of a short flattish fleshy stalk, fringed at the sides and end with several short, simple branches. The cirri on the front nostrils are flattened and spoon-like, with shallowly indented margins.

The form of the dorsal fin is different from that of any other species: the first dorsal spine is low, about equal to the fourth, while the second, and to lesser extend, the third, dorsal spines are elevated. There is no notch in the membrane between the third and fourth dorsal spines. There are clusters or 2–3 cirri at the tips of the dorsal spines for about half the length of the fin. The first two pelvic rays are elongate, and the third pelvic ray absent. The caudal peduncle is short.

Colouration is very variable. The body colour is generally buff, with an overlaying pattern in a variety of colours, from pink, to olive green, light or darker brown, reddish or yellowish. Some specimens are in a uniform colour, from black to yellow, crimson or virtually white, but most display a pattern of vertical bars, usually off-set along the lateral line, surrounded by small dots in the colour of the bars. The whole appearance can be very mottled, with the pattern barely discernible. Specimens from the coast north of Lambert's Bay can be pale buff with brown streaks, speckles, and reticulations. Sometimes there are bright orange blotches at the base of the dorsal fin, or longitudinal irregular brown bands crossed by broad confluent patches of the same shade. There may be a bright blue, red-edged spot over the first three dorsal spines. Fins may be red-tipped, and the anal fin is often entirely red. Branchiostegal membranes are pale with fine black dots, with a characteristic dark line along the edge of the united gill membranes. Pectoral fins ore mostly translucent with rays in the body colour.

Distinguishing features are a yellow-edged, dark green or black spot on the first three dorsal spines, with a similar spot further back on the dorsal fin, a short distance behind the pectoral fins, and sometimes a third one further back. The eyes have distinctive bright green and orange radial bands and a bright yellow iris. The face, and especially the cheeks exhibit two different patterns. The more common pattern consists of two bands in the colour of the darker bands on the body. The first band is narrow and slants down and back from the eye, and the other band is a deep "comma" shape straight back from the eye, curving down in a hook. Between the two bands is a pale buff area. The second pattern is more variable, and can consist of spots in the darker body colour, sometimes forming a leopard-spot-like set of marks. Some fish show a combination of the mottling and the two bars.

Juveniles resemble adults, in colouration and shape.

Size up to 130 mm (5.1 in).

=== Diagnostics ===
The dorsal fin has 37 to 41 spines, followed by 2 to 3 rays. The anal fin has 2 spines and 23 to 28 rays. The pectoral fin has 14 rays, and the ventral fin has 1 spine and 2 rays. There are 3 gill rakers on the upper limb of the first gill arch and 6 to 8 on the lower limb. There are 17 to 18 abdominal vertebrae and 28 to 31 caudal vertebrae. The lateral line has 25 vertical pairs of pores along the front part of the line. There are 4 to 5 times the body depth in the standard length, and 3.75 to 4.75 times the head length in the standard length. The head length is from 2.25 to 3.75 times the eye diameter. The length of the caudal peduncle is 26.5–33% of the head length, and its depth is 23.5–29% of the head length.

== Taxonomy ==
=== Synonyms ===
Ophthalmolophus venustris (Gilchrist & W. W. Thompson, 1908)

=== Common names ===
- Speckled klipfish
- Multicoloured klipfish

=== Etymology ===
Ventustris: probably from venustus; charming, lovely, beautiful, graceful. Gilchrist & Thompson (1908) mentioned that "the tints are always very pleasingly arranged."

== Distribution and habitat ==
Lüderitzbucht to Port Alfred. Southern African endemic. This species occurs on subtidal reefs down to 30 m (98 ft) and in pools at the bottom of the intertidal region, but does not venture over sand. It is taken intertidally more frequently west of Cape Point than from False Bay eastwards. On reefs thickly grown-over with hydroids and feather-stars, it can be common and is often seen by divers.

== Behaviour ==
Usually one pair in a rock pool. Usually cautious, but not necessarily shy, and will allow careful approach. Juveniles are more skittish, and will flee suddenly, although usually not far.

== Diet ==
The speckled klipfish feeds primarily on amphipods, isopods, mysids, and echinoderms.

== Reproduction ==
Viviparous.
