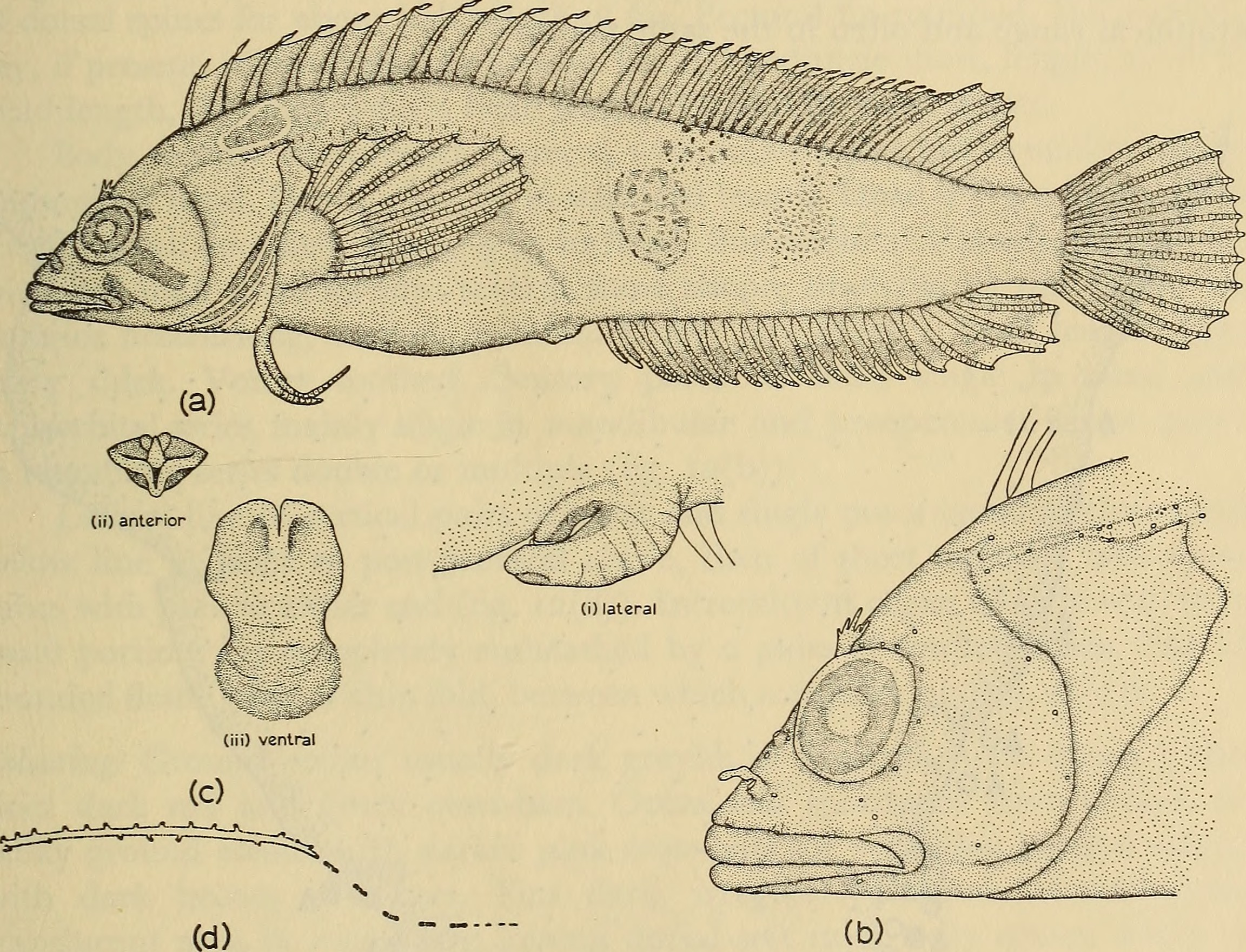

Conservation status
- Least Concern (IUCN 3.1)

Scientific classification
- Kingdom: Animalia
- Phylum: Chordata
- Class: Actinopterygii
- Order: Blenniiformes
- Family: Clinidae
- Genus: Clinus
- Species: C. acuminatus

Binomial name
- Clinus acuminatus (Bloch & J. G. Schneider, 1801)

Synonyms
- Blennius acuminatus Bloch & J. G. Schneider, 1801; Ophthalmolophus acuminatus (Bloch & J. G. Schneider, 1801)

= Clinus acuminatus =

Species of fish

Clinus acuminatus, the sad klipfish, is a species of fish in the family Clinidae. It is endemic to Southern Africa, where it occurs along the coast of Namibia and South Africa. It can reach a maximum length of 13 centimetres (5.1 in) TL and is viviparous. The sad klipfish feeds on crustaceans.

== Description ==
The sad klipfish reaches a size of about 13 cm. It has a slightly compressed body with a wedge-shaped snout. There are prominent tentacles above the eyes with short, flattened stalks, ending in short, simple branches. The dorsal fin is low and even, with the first spine being shortest.

Colouration is variable; generally pale, from a light buff to light green, yellowish brown or grey, somewhat mottled and speckled with small white spots and generally a few darker mosaic-like or speckled dark brown bars on the body. Sometimes the ground colour is of a darker shade, often with irregular clusters of white specks along the base of the dorsal fin. The tips of fins and supra-orbital tentacles are vermilion. There is usually a dark spot on the shoulder, and two dark radiating bands from the eye backwards across the cheek, and often a thin band downwards just in front of the eye. These give the fish a "sad" appearance. Small juveniles are white with well-defined black cross-bars.

This fish may be hard to distinguish from Clinus heterodon which occupies a similar environment. The body shape is similar, but the sad klipfish has a larger head and lower dorsal fin profile, and C. heterodon does not show the mosaic-like bars.

=== Diagnostics ===
The dorsal fin has 30 to 34 spines, followed by 5 to 7 rays. The anal fin has 2 spines and 20 to 24 rays. The pectoral fin has 12 to 13 rays, and the ventral fin has 1 spine and 2 to 3 rays. There are 1 to 2 gill rakers on the upper limb of the first gill arch and 4 to 6 on the lower limb. There are 16 abdominal vertebrae and 27 to 29 caudal vertebrae. The lateral line has 2 to 4 vertical pores above the opercle, then single pores alternately above and below along the front part of the line. There are 4.5 to 6 times the body depth in the standard length, and 3.2 to 4 times the head length in the standard length. The head length is from 2.75 to 5 times the eye diameter. The length of the caudal peduncle is 20.5% to 33.5% of the head length, and its depth is 20% to 35% of the head length head length.

== Habitat and distribution ==
The species occurs west of Algoa Bay subtidally to Lüderitzbucht, but is more common west of Cape Point. It is abundant on the littoral of the Cape Peninsula and common in rock pools in Sea Point. It can be found under rocks and ledges in intertidal rock pools.

== Ecology ==
The sad klipfish feeds on crustaceans such as amphipods, isopods, and crabs. It is viviparous, with a sexual frequency of 36%-53% for females. The species inhabits shallow rock pools and may thus be under some pressure from coastal development and tourism in the eastern part of its range, but is more abundant in its western range and likely unimpacted there.
