= Clinus woodi =

Conservation status
- Least Concern (IUCN 3.1)

Scientific classification
- Kingdom: Animalia
- Phylum: Chordata
- Class: Actinopterygii
- Order: Blenniiformes
- Family: Clinidae
- Genus: Clinus
- Species: C. woodi

Binomial name
- Clinus woodi (J. L. B. Smith, 1946)

Synonyms
- Petraites woodi J. L. B. Smith, 1946

Species of fish

Clinus woodi, the Oldman klipfish, is a species of clinid that occurs in subtropical waters of the Indian Ocean from Mozambique to South Africa where it can be found in tide pools with plentiful seaweed and in the subtidal zone. This species can reach a maximum length of 16 centimetres (6.3 in) TL. The identity of the person honored in the specific name of the species was not given by J. L. B. Smith but it is thought to be his friend Alexander Thomas Wood (1872-1957) of Xora Mouth, South Africa which is the type locality for C. woodi. Wood provided specimens to Smith and had a cottage that Smith often used as a base for carrying out fieldwork.
