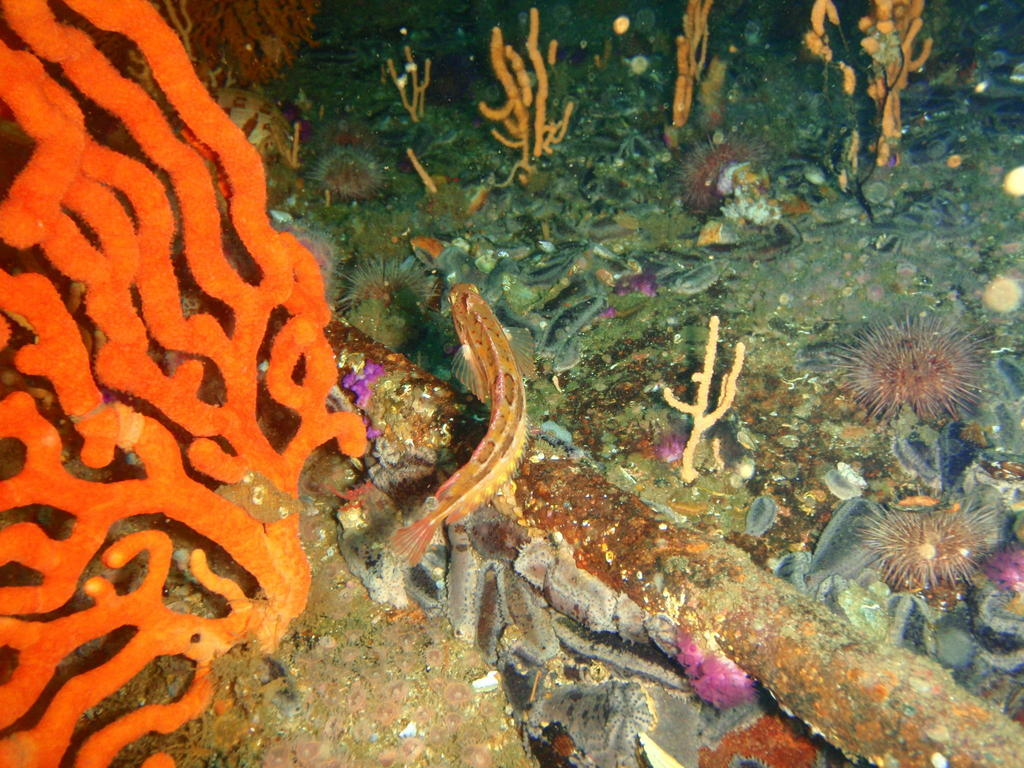

Scientific classification
- Domain: Eukaryota
- Kingdom: Animalia
- Phylum: Chordata
- Class: Actinopterygii
- Order: Blenniiformes
- Family: Clinidae
- Genus: Clinus
- Species: C. exasperatus

Binomial name
- Clinus exasperatus Holleman, van der Heyden & Zsilavecz, 2012

= Clinus exasperatus =

Species of fish

Clinus exasperatus is a species of clinid which is known from only two specimens collected in the sea from among kelp, in Betty's Bay in South Africa. The specific name refers to Sophie van der Heyden's exasperation at her failure to find a second specimen.

== Common name ==
Betty's Bay Klipfish
