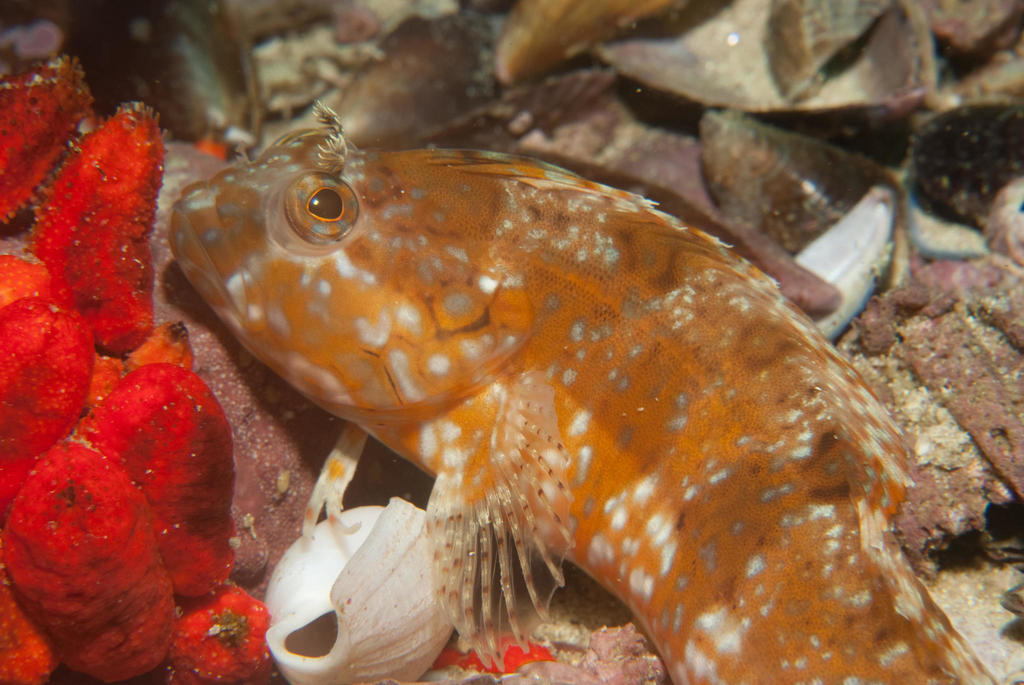

Scientific classification
- Kingdom: Animalia
- Phylum: Chordata
- Class: Actinopterygii
- Order: Blenniiformes
- Family: Clinidae
- Genus: Clinus
- Species: C. musaicus

Binomial name
- Clinus musaicus Holleman, van der Heyden & Zsilavecz, 2012

= Clinus musaicus =

Species of fish

Clinus musaicus, the mosaic klipfish, is a species of bony fish from the family Clinidae, the kelp blennies. It is endemic to the waters off the Western Cape in South Africa where it occurs off the Cape Peninsula in False Bay on the Peninsula's eastern coast and the Atlantic Ocean off its western coast. All the specimens were collected from areas of flat, sandy substrates with scattered shell fragments.
