= Clinus rotundifrons =

Conservation status
- Least Concern (IUCN 3.1)

Scientific classification
- Kingdom: Animalia
- Phylum: Chordata
- Class: Actinopterygii
- Order: Blenniiformes
- Family: Clinidae
- Genus: Clinus
- Species: C. rotundifrons

Binomial name
- Clinus rotundifrons Barnard, 1937

Synonyms
- Gymnoclinus rotundifrons (Barnard, 1937)

Species of fish

Clinus rotundifrons, the kelp klipfish, is a species of clinid that occurs in subtropical waters of the Atlantic Ocean from Namibia to South Africa where it inhabits kelp beds. This species can reach a length of greater than 10 centimetres (3.9 in).
