= Bot River klipfish =

Conservation status
- Endangered (IUCN 3.1)

Scientific classification
- Kingdom: Animalia
- Phylum: Chordata
- Class: Actinopterygii
- Order: Blenniiformes
- Family: Clinidae
- Genus: Clinus
- Species: C. spatulatus

Binomial name
- Clinus spatulatus B. A. Bennett, 1983

Species of fish

The Bot River klipfish (Clinus spatulatus) is a species of clinid endemic to South Africa where it is found in brackish waters of the Bot River and the Kleinmond Estuary where it lives amongst weeds. This species can reach a length of 17.5 centimetres (6.9 in) TL.
