= Clinus latipennis =

Conservation status
- Endangered (IUCN 3.1)

Scientific classification
- Kingdom: Animalia
- Phylum: Chordata
- Class: Actinopterygii
- Order: Blenniiformes
- Family: Clinidae
- Genus: Clinus
- Species: C. latipennis

Binomial name
- Clinus latipennis Valenciennes, 1836

Synonyms
- Ophthalmolophus latipennis (Valenciennes, 1836)

Species of fish

Clinus latipennis, the False Bay klipfish, is a species of clinid fish that occurs in subtropical waters of the Atlantic Ocean from Table Bay to Cape Agulhas, South Africa. This species can reach a length of 12 centimetres (4.7 in) TL.
