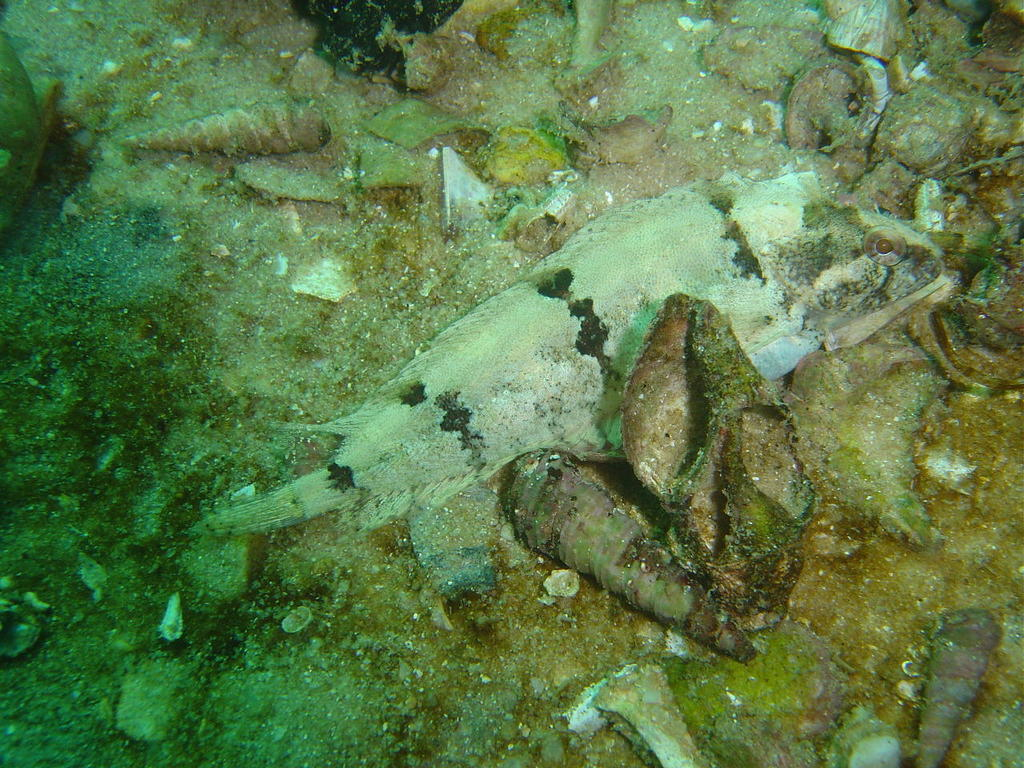

Conservation status
- Least Concern (IUCN 3.1)

Scientific classification
- Kingdom: Animalia
- Phylum: Chordata
- Class: Actinopterygii
- Order: Blenniiformes
- Family: Clinidae
- Genus: Clinus
- Species: C. agilis

Binomial name
- Clinus agilis J. L. B. Smith, 1931

Synonyms
- Ophthalmolophus agilis (J. L. B. Smith, 1931); Ophthalmolophus anne J. L. B. Smith, 1948; Clinus anne (J. L. B. Smith, 1948); Clinus marmoratus (Castelnau, 1861)

= Clinus agilis =

Species of marine fish

Clinus agilis, the agile klipfish, is a species of clinid found in subtropical waters of the Atlantic Ocean from Namibia to South Africa where it is commonly found in estuaries and tide pools. This species can reach a maximum length of 10 centimetres (3.9 in) (total length).

== Description ==
- Fins: dorsal fin spines 32 to 38, rays 2 to 4; anal fin spines 2, rays 20 to 25; pectoral fin rays 13 to 15; ventral fin spines 1, rays 2 to 3
- Gill rakers (1 to 2) + (3 to 5)
- Vertebrae (16 to 17) + (27 to 30)
- Lateral line with vertical pairs of pores in front, then single pores alternating above and below
- Body depth 4.5 to 5.25 in standard length
- Head length 3.5 to 4.5 in standard length
- Eye 3 to 4.25 diameters in head length
- Caudal peduncle 23 to 31% head length, depth 25.5 to 29% head length

=== Shape ===
The body is moderately elongate and slightly compressed. The dorsal profile is gently curved from the snout to the base of the forward dorsal spines, with a slight hump above the back edge of the preopercle. The snout is moderately sharp, and the mouth narrow in front, but wide at the gill openings. The cleft of the mouth is oblique with fairly thick lips. The jaws are sub-equal. There is a broad band of teeth in each jaw, with the outer row enlarged, and a curved or chevron shaped band on the vomer. Prominent tentacles above the eyes consist of flattish stalks dividing into several short simple branches at the tips. The cirri on the front nostrils are long, narrow and pointed. The dorsal fin is low, the first three spines are not elevated to form a crest, but are widely spaced. There is a notch in the fin membrane between the third and fourth spines, varying in depth, but rarely absent. The remaining spines gradually increase in length. There are clusters of 3-4 cirri at tips of the dorsal spines for about half the length of the fin. The inner pelvic ray is very small when present, but usually absent. The caudal peduncle is short.

=== Colour ===
Adults are mottled dark greyish, brown or grey-green with seven or eight irregular darker red and green bars extending in some cases obliquely onto the base of the dorsal. There is a narrow dark band at base of caudal, and a dark patch on nape. The head is spotted. There are dark spots on anal, pectoral and caudal, fewer on dorsal. There is a curved dark line near base of the caudal fin. Occasionally there are irregular reddish blotches on dorsal (males), and a reddish tinge on posterior margin of opercle. Sometimes a black spot appears on the membrane between the first and second dorsal spines. Occasional specimens have a pinkish or milky ground colour with darker pink bars, or a vermilion ground colour with dark brown bars. Fins are dark and irregularly barred. There is a characteristic translucent area in the membrane joining the dorsal soft rays. The belly is silvery white to greyish. There is sometimes a sprinkling of white spots over the body. The head has an irregular lacy pattern in the body colours, or is plain dark grey. There is usually a light-edged dark ocellate spot on the shoulder.

The base colour is pale grey to dark white, which darker vertical bars of varying width. There seem to be two main pattern varieties. The first type consists of seven vertical bars. These bars are irregular, but more or less ragged on the edges. The bars can be so wide as to make the overall colour virtually black, dark brown or dark maroon. The second type consists of four thin dark vertical bars. This leaves the fish with an overall pale colour. There are always two lines radiating from the eye, a thick one towards the rear, reaching the edge of the opercle, with a thinner one down but slanted backwards. Often the dividing line is thin and dark.

Eyes are light brown, occasionally with radial lines, and with a dark pupil and pale iris. The lower part of the eye is white with a line extending back and becoming fainter towards the edge of the opercle. The top of the head is always dark, while the inter-orbital region is generally pale. There is generally a dark spot on the shoulder, edged in white, especially towards the rear.

There is a marked similarity in appearance between Clinus brevicristatus and Clinus agilis, both in body form and colour pattern. The difference taxonomically is the lower dorsal spine count in Clinus agilis, while visually the first three dorsal spines are not elevated into a small crest, with only a shallow notch between the third and fourth dorsal spine, if at all. The easiest differentiation is that in Clinus agilis the dorsal fin does not have translucent patches, except at the dorsal spines.

Juveniles are mainly dark red-brown with similar markings. The margin of the anal fin and a bar behind and below eye are reddish. Adult specimens are grey-green, with markings much as in juveniles. Juveniles are white with well-defined red cross-bars.

=== Size ===
It can attain 10 cm. The largest specimen found measured 13.6 cm total length.

== Distribution ==
This fish is found from Lüderitz to Port Alfred. It is common west of Cape Point, and in the weed-beds of Knysna estuary. It is found in rock pools in Sea Point, and various locations in False Bay, notably large numbers in Simon's Town harbour.

== Habitat ==
The fish is common in tide pools on the coast west of the Cape and among sea-grass in the Knysna estuary. It hides among weeds in pools and estuaries.

All areas were on the bottom and close to sand. This contrasts with Clinus brevicristatus which have only been found on walls of reefs. Specimens have been found in virtually barren rock pools.

== Etymology ==
Agilis: from "agile", referring to its behaviour.
