= Clinus helenae =

Conservation status
- Least Concern (IUCN 3.1)

Scientific classification
- Kingdom: Animalia
- Phylum: Chordata
- Class: Actinopterygii
- Order: Blenniiformes
- Family: Clinidae
- Genus: Clinus
- Species: C. helenae

Binomial name
- Clinus helenae (J. L. B. Smith, 1946)

Synonyms
- Ophthalmolophus helenae J. L. B. Smith, 1946

Species of fish

Clinus helenae, the Helen's klipfish, is a species of clinid that occurs in subtropical waters of the Atlantic Ocean around South Africa where it is a denizen of tide pools. This species can reach a maximum length of 10 centimetres (3.9 in) TL. The identity of the person honoured in the matronym in this species' specific name is thought to be J. L. B. Smith's mother-in-law Helen Evelyn Zondagh (1877-1951).
