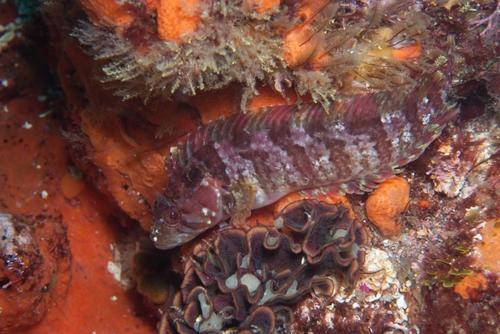

Conservation status
- Least Concern (IUCN 3.1)

Scientific classification
- Kingdom: Animalia
- Phylum: Chordata
- Class: Actinopterygii
- Order: Blenniiformes
- Family: Clinidae
- Genus: Clinus
- Species: C. berrisfordi

Binomial name
- Clinus berrisfordi M. L. Penrith, 1967

= Clinus berrisfordi =

Onrust klipvis

Species of fish

Clinus berrisfordi, the Onrust klipfish, is a species of clinid that occurs in subtropical waters of the Atlantic Ocean from False Bay to Skoenmakerskop, South Africa where it prefers marine and brackish habitats with plentiful growth of seaweed. This species can reach a maximum length of 12 centimetres (4.7 in) TL.

== Description ==
The body is slightly compressed. The snout is wedge-shaped, with an acute profile angle and moderate to thin lips. There are prominent tentacles above the eyes, with flattened stalks ending in several long filaments. The cirri on the front nostrils have a narrow stalk and a flattened, bilobed tip. The first three dorsal spines are not elevated to form a crest, but are equal to or longer than the fourth and succeeding spines, and there is no notch in the membrane between the third and fourth spines. The dorsal spines are tipped with clusters of 3 fine cirri for about half the length of the fin. The inner pelvic ray is always very small. The caudal peduncle is short.

The body is reddish orange with about seven faint darker bars. Two dark lines radiate from the eyes across the cheek, and there is a dark ocellate spot on the shoulder. The fins are also reddish orange, faintly mottled and barred.

Attains 12 cm.

=== Diagnostics ===
The dorsal fin has 33 to 36 spines, followed by 5 to 6 rays. The anal fin has 2 spines and 22 to 25 rays. The pectoral fin has 11 to 13 rays, and the ventral fin has 1 spine and 3 rays. There are 3 to 4 gill rakers on the upper limb of the first gill arch ) and 6 to 7 on the lower limb. There are 16 to 17 abdominal vertebrae and 28 to 31 caudal vertebrae. The lateral line has about 23 vertically paired pores at the front and a few single pores above and below the line. There are 4.5 to 5 times the body depth in the standard length, and 3.4 to 4 times the head length in the standard length. The head length is from 3 to 4.2 times the eye diameter. The length of the caudal peduncle is 20% to 35% of the head length, and its depth is 20% to 35% of the head length head length.

=== Common names ===
Onrust klipfish.

=== Etymology ===
Berrisfordi: after C.D. Berrisford, who aided in collection of specimens.

== Distribution and habitat ==
Known from False Bay to just west of Algoa Bay. Inhabits weedy pools at the bottom of the intertidal region.

== Reproduction ==
Viviparous.
