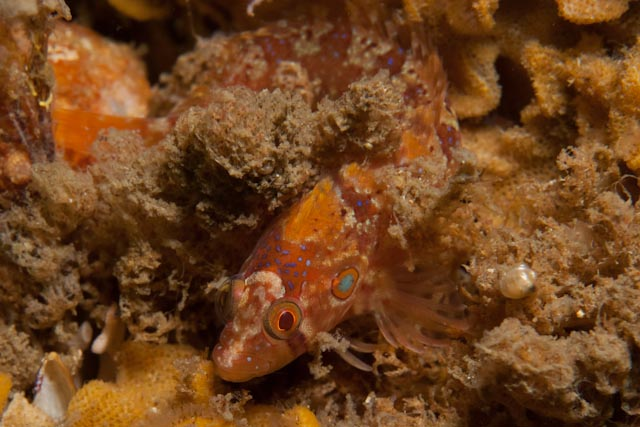

Conservation status
- Least Concern (IUCN 3.1)

Scientific classification
- Kingdom: Animalia
- Phylum: Chordata
- Class: Actinopterygii
- Order: Blenniiformes
- Family: Clinidae
- Genus: Pavoclinus
- Species: P. profundus

Binomial name
- Pavoclinus profundus J. L. B. Smith, 1961

= Pavoclinus profundus =

Species of clinid fish from South Africa

Pavoclinus profundus, the Deepwater klipfish, is a species of clinid found from Knysna to Algoa Bay along the South African coast where it can be found at depths of from 20 to 40 metres (66 to 131 ft). It can reach a maximum length of 5 centimetres (2.0 in) TL.
