= Clinus cottoides =

Conservation status
- Least Concern (IUCN 3.1)

Scientific classification
- Kingdom: Animalia
- Phylum: Chordata
- Class: Actinopterygii
- Order: Blenniiformes
- Family: Clinidae
- Genus: Clinus
- Species: C. cottoides

Binomial name
- Clinus cottoides Valenciennes, 1836

Synonyms
- Blenniomimus cottoides (Valenciennes, 1836)

Species of fish

Clinus cottoides, the bluntnose klipfish, is a species of clinid that occurs in subtropical waters of the Atlantic Ocean around South Africa where it is a denizen of tide pools. This species can reach a maximum length of 15 centimetres (5.9 in) TL. This species has a varied diet of benthic organisms including algae, crustaceans (isopods, amphipods, ostracods, copepods), mollusks (gastropods, chitons) and polychaete worms. Comparing reproductive rates between males and females of the species, males tend to have a higher rate engaging in sexual activity. This results in a polygynandrous mating system.

== Description ==
Body is slightly compressed, a relatively small head with a wedge shaped snout and obtuse profile angle. It has a cluster of 4 - 5 tentacles above each eye. The first 4 - 5 dorsal spines are slightly shorter than the rest, with no notches in the membrane between spines.

Colouration is typically yellow to dark brown with 4 to 7 distinct bars. Two dark stripes radiate from the eye towards the operculum, when young, these lines are separated by intermittent blue spots. It has a characteristic dark spot on the operculum and very large, dark eyes. The center of the eye is slightly behind the edge of lips.

== Diagnostics ==
Dorsal fin: XXXI - XXXVI spines, 4 - 6 soft rays. Anal fin: II spines, 21 - 25.

== Images ==
Representative images of this species can be found on the iNaturalist page for C. cottoides.

== Reproduction ==
Just as all members of the Clinidae family, it is viviparous.
