= Clinus heterodon =

Conservation status
- Least Concern (IUCN 3.1)

Scientific classification
- Kingdom: Animalia
- Phylum: Chordata
- Class: Actinopterygii
- Order: Blenniiformes
- Family: Clinidae
- Genus: Clinus
- Species: C. heterodon

Binomial name
- Clinus heterodon Valenciennes, 1836

Synonyms
- Pavoclinus heterodon (Valenciennes, 1836); Clinus obtusifrons M. L. Penrith, 1967

Species of fish

Clinus heterodon, the westcoast klipfish, is a species of clinid that occurs in subtropical waters of the Atlantic Ocean from Namibia to South Africa where it is a denizen of tide pools. This species can reach a maximum length of 13 centimetres (5.1 in) TL. This species lives in tidal pools and feeds on marine invertebrates.

== Description ==
Body is slightly compressed and elongate, with a wedge saped snout. The first three spines are not elevated and there is no noticeable notches in the membrane between spines. It has a flattened tentacle with fine cirri above each eye. Colouration is green-brown with irregular crossbars; the tips of the pelvic and anal fins are red; while the tips of dorsal dorsal fin and tentacles are pale. It has a yellow or blue edged spot on the shoulder, and two bands across cheek.

Attains 13cm.

== Diagnostics ==
Dorsal fin: XXX - XXXII spines, 6 - 7 soft rays. Anal fin: II spines, 20 - 22.
