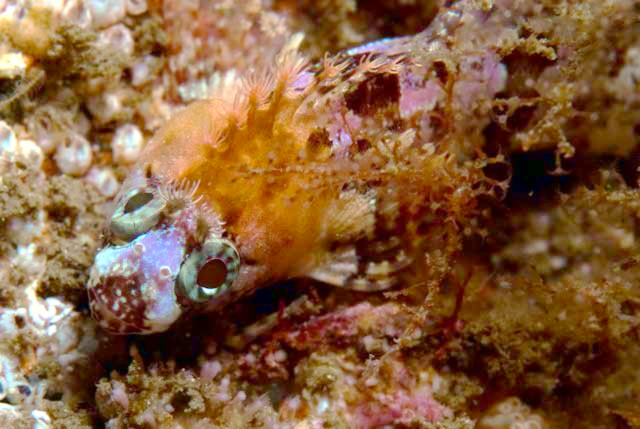

Conservation status
- Least Concern (IUCN 3.1)

Scientific classification
- Kingdom: Animalia
- Phylum: Chordata
- Class: Actinopterygii
- Order: Blenniiformes
- Family: Clinidae
- Genus: Clinus
- Species: C. nematopterus

Binomial name
- Clinus nematopterus Günther, 1861

= Clinus nematopterus =

Species of fish

Clinus nematopterus, the Chinese klipfish, that occurs in subtropical waters of the Atlantic Ocean where, despite its common name, it is endemic to South Africa, the common name having derived from a locality error in the original description. This species can reach a maximum length of 11 centimetres (4.3 in) TL. This species feeds on benthic crustaceans (amphipods, isopods, ostracods) and also takes other fishes.

== Diagnostics ==
Dorsal fin: XXXI - XXXIV spines, 5 - 7 rays. Anal fin: II spines, 20 - 23 rays.
