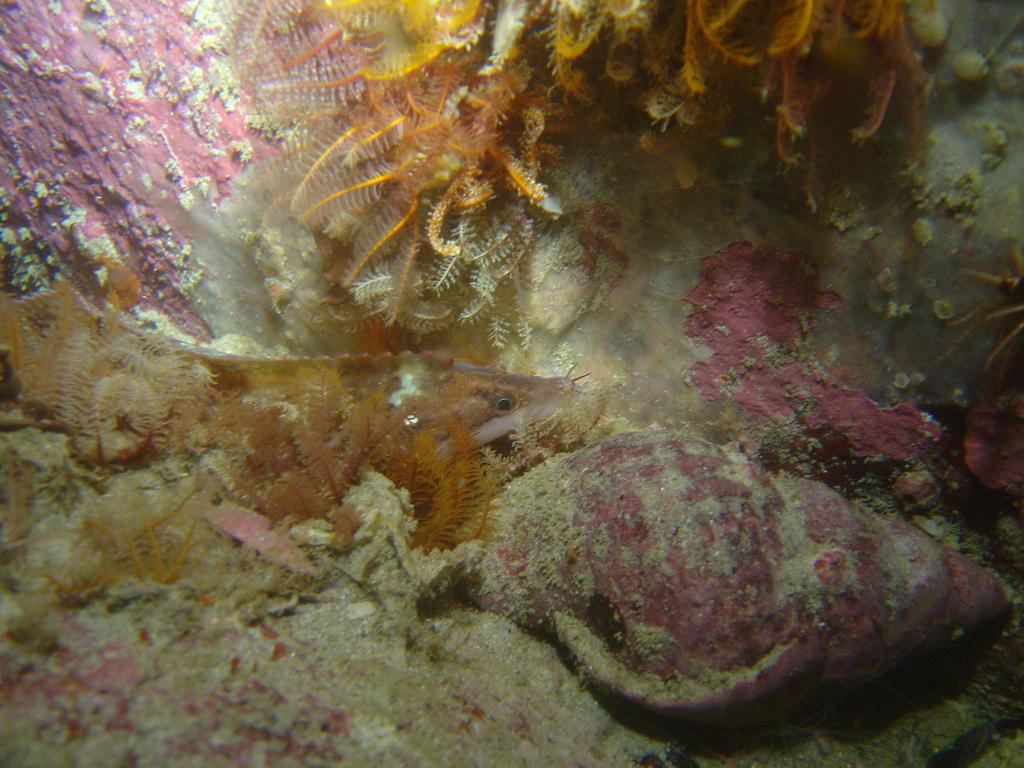

Conservation status
- Least Concern (IUCN 3.1)

Scientific classification
- Kingdom: Animalia
- Phylum: Chordata
- Class: Actinopterygii
- Order: Blenniiformes
- Family: Clinidae
- Genus: Cirrhibarbis
- Species: C. capensis

Binomial name
- Cirrhibarbis capensis Valenciennes, 1836

= Cirrhibarbis =

Species of fish

Cirrhibarbis capensis, the barbelled klipfish, is a species of clinid found in subtropical waters of the Atlantic Ocean around South Africa. This species can reach a maximum length of 36 centimetres (14 in) TL. This species preys primarily on benthic crustaceans, mostly amphipods and isopods. It is currently the only known member of its genus.

== Description ==
- Fins: Dorsal fin spines 37 to 44, rays 5 to 9; Anal fin spines 2, rays 26 to 34; Pectoral fin rays 12 to 14; Ventral fin spines 1, rays 2 to 3.
- Gill rakers (2 to 3)+(5 to 7).
- Vertebrae (18 to 21)+(32 to 37).
- Lateral line with about 30 vertical pairs of pores in front.
- Body depth 5 to 6 in Standard length.
- Head length 3.5 to 4.5 in Standard length.
- Eye 3.5 to 5.5 diameters in head length.
- Caudal peduncle 20 to 30% head length, depth 18 to 26% head length.

Shape:

The body is elongate and slightly compressed. The head profile is straight or slightly concave, with a long and pointed snout. Pores on the head are clearly visible. The mouth is wide, with thick lips. The jaws are slightly pointed and the lower jaw projects beyond the upper jaw which has a row of 3 plain barbels at the front, which are joined at the base and spread widely once separated. The 8 barbels on the chin are usually arranged in a circular group of 6, but sometimes in 2 rows of 3 each, with 2 barbels a little to the rear and further apart individually. The space between the eyes is convex. There is a prominent short palmate tentacle with from 4 to 12 cirri at the end at the upper rear of each eye, and a large, spatulate, tentacle at each forward nostril. with about four shallow, flat lobes at the tip. The dorsal fin is low, with no crest, with spines gradually increasing in length towards the tail, and the soft rays slightly higher than the preceding spines. Each dorsal spine has a cluster of 3 to 5 little cirri at the tip. The pectoral fins are rounded. The Inner pelvic fins are reduced, with the free tip very short or absent. The caudal peduncle is short.

Colour:

The colours are variable, but usually all reddish as a base, marbled brown, green or yellow; often with a row of dark blotches below the base of the dorsal fin, and may have irregular transverse bars or blotches on the body, often speckled with white or other shades. The belly may be pale or dark but is usually more uniform in colour, and the tips of the anal, ventral and pectoral fins are red. In most specimens there is a roundish white blotch bisected by a narrower black blotch behind the head at the start of the lateral line. They may also be pinkish, grey, or greenish mottled or milky. Fins and facial cirri are usually red. Juvenile specimens and occasional adult can be milky white with longitudinal black stripes and red fins and facial cirri. The eyes are dark with a thin reddish or yellow, not very prominent iris. The rest of eye is uniformly background colour. Small juveniles (3–4 cm) may have longitudinal bands of light and darker colours, and may be translucent. Young specimens have much brighter colours than adults.

Size:

Up to 350mm.

== Distribution ==
South African endemic. Rare west of Cape Point to Lamberts Bay, common from False Bay to East London. Seen mostly in False Bay, from Fish Hoek to Batsata rock, all locations, but especially the wreck of the Clan Stuart and at Windmill and A-Frame. Rarer on Atlantic seaboard, but have been seen at the V&A waterfront off Oceana Powerboat club, and along the Sea Point coast. Depth of these sighting were from close to the surface to about 15m depth. Juveniles were seen in very shallow water (1m or less) at the Knysna Heads. Extreme juveniles and young specimens were seen in shallow water, under rocks, and in rock pools.

== Habitat ==
Adults are mainly sublittoral; juveniles plentiful under stones in rockpools. In deeper water most adult specimens were seen at night, when they are found in areas where there is plenty of shelter between and under boulders. Younger specimens were found in rock pools

== Etymology ==
Capensis: from Cape, referring to the region where originally caught.
