= Climacoporus navalis =

Conservation status
- Least Concern (IUCN 3.1)

Scientific classification
- Kingdom: Animalia
- Phylum: Chordata
- Class: Actinopterygii
- Order: Blenniiformes
- Family: Clinidae
- Genus: Climacoporus
- Species: C. navalis

Binomial name
- Climacoporus navalis Barnard, 1935

Species of fish

Climacoporus navalis, the fleet klipfish, is a species of clinid found in subtropical waters of the Atlantic Ocean along the coast of South Africa where it can be found in tide pools. This species can reach a maximum length of 7 centimetres (2.8 in) TL. It is currently the only known member of its genus.

== Description ==
- Fins: Dorsal fin spines 33 to 38, rays 0 to 1; Anal fin spines 2, rays 22 to 24; Pectoral fin rays 12; Ventral fin spines 1, rays 2 to 3.
- Gill rakers (1 to 2)+5.
- Vertebrae 15+(27to 29).
- Lateral line with about 80 double pores.
- Body depth 5 to 6.25 in Standard length.
- Head length 4 to 5.25 in Standard length.
- Eye 3 to 4 diameters in head length.
- Caudal peduncle 25 to 33.5% head length, depth 25 to 33.5% head length.

Shape:

The body is elongate and moderately compressed. Profile of the head is slightly convex. The caudal peduncle is short. There is a pair of prominent, transversely flattened, palmate tentacles above the eyes. The mouth has thick lips and is a band of smaller teeth behind the front row in both jaws, with a curved band of teeth on the vomer. The dorsal fin is low, even and without cirri at the tips of the dorsal spines. The 1st to 4th spines are more widely spaced than the rest. The third ray of the pelvic (ventral) fin is reduced or absent. The cirri on the front nostrils are small and flap-like, slightly emarginate below the apex.

Colour:

The fish can be reddish or maroon-brown, or yellow-brown to greenish, streaked, mottled or barred irregularly with darker green or brown and may have a cream belly. The head is green or reddish brown. There is an oval dark ocellus with a pale border between the start of the lateral line and the 2nd or 3rd dorsal spines, a dark band across base of the caudal fin, followed by 2 narrower bands and a few irregular spots. The edge of the anal fin is pale.

Size:

Attains 7 centimetres (2.8 in).

== Distribution ==
Still Bay to Port St. Johns.

== Habitat ==
This species is quite abundant in rock pools.

== Etymology ==
Navalis: of or relating to ships, referring to the location where first specimen was caught, a ship in Simon's Town harbour.
