= John Gilchrist (zoologist) =

Scottish and South African ichthyologist (1866–1926)

John D.F. Gilchrist
- Born: 1866; Anstruther, Fife, Scotland
- Died: 22 October 1926; St James, Western Cape, South Africa
- Education: Madras College; University of St Andrews; University of Edinburgh; Ludwig-Maximilians-Universität München; University of Zurich
- Known for: Gilchrist's round herring
- Spouse: Elfreda R. Raubenheimer
- Scientific career
- Fields: Marine biology

John Dow Fisher Gilchrist FRSSAf (1866–1926) was a Scottish ichthyologist, who established ichthyology as a scientific discipline in South Africa. He was instrumental in the development of marine biology in South Africa and of a scientifically based local fishing industry.

== Education and career ==
Gilchrist was born in Anstruther, Fife, Scotland in 1866. His early education was at Madras College, St Andrews, Scotland. He studied at the University of St Andrews and the University of Edinburgh, graduating with a Bachelor of Science (B.Sc.) and a Master of Arts (MA). He was awarded an 1851 Exhibition scholarship for advanced studies and research, which enabled him to study feeding in marine fishes. After further studies at the Ludwig-Maximilians-Universität München and the University of Zurich, he obtained his PhD in geology at the University of Jena in 1894.

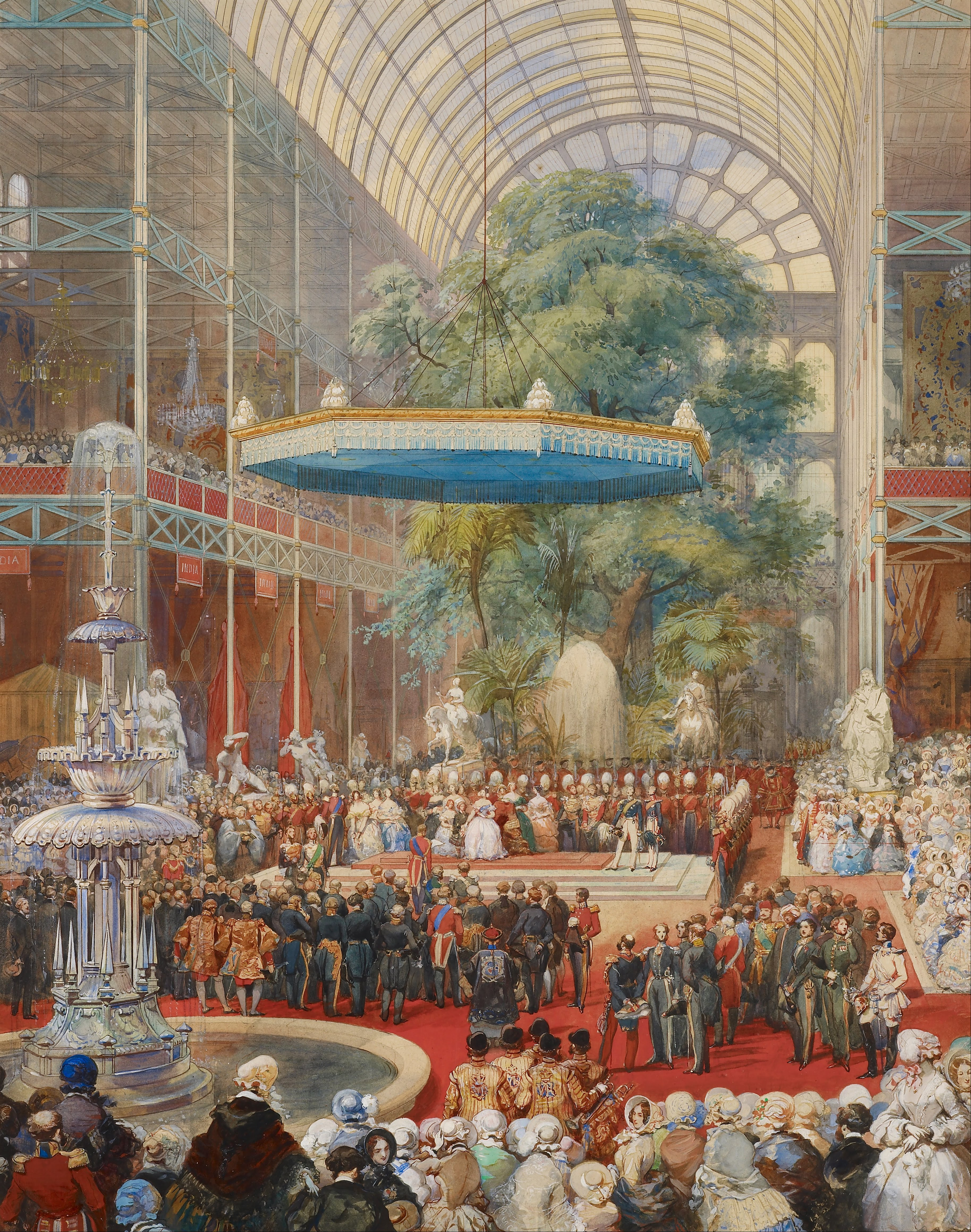
Opening of the Great Exhibition, 1 May 1851

He studied marine biology in Naples, Monaco and the Isle of Man before returning to teach zoology at the University of Edinburgh. During his three months at Naples (May to July 1893) he completed most of the translation of Monismus als Band zwischen Religion und Wissenschaft, by Ernst Haeckel, into English as Monism as Connecting Religion and Science. The Confession of Faith of a Man of Science (1894). Haeckel sent a copy of the English translation to Huxley and complained about the difficulties Gilchrist had encountered trying to find a publisher.

Gilchrist was appointed Marine Biologist in the Department of Agriculture of the Cape of Good Hope, Cape Colony in December 1895 and took up the position in early 1896. He held the post of Professor and Director of Fisheries and Marine Biological Survey of South Africa and initiated a marine biological survey in 1897, using the vessel Pieter Faure, which led to the discovery of new stocks of hake near Dassen Island and sole near Mossel Bay. The survey was extended in 1901 to the coast of Natal but no new trawling grounds were found.

A biological laboratory for marine research focusing on marine fauna, sea temperature and salinity as a means of studying ocean currents, was built at St James in 1902 at Gilchrist's request. William Wardlaw Thompson was his assistant for most of Gilchrist's tenure and Thompson co-authored many important papers with him, including The Freshwater Fishes of South Africa and A catalogue of the sea fishes recorded from Natal.

The specimens collected during the marine surveys resulted in the discovery of hundreds of new species and several new genera of marine organisms, including many that had not been observed in South African waters before. Gilchrist described many of the new species himself, while others were sent to overseas specialists such as G.A. Boulenger, G.B. Sowerby, T.R.R. Stebbing, S.J. Hickson and J. Stanley Gardiner, whose descriptions were published in the six volumes of Marine investigations in South Africa (1902-1910), the first marine science journal in Southern Africa, which Gilchrist edited and to which he contributed many papers.

Gilchrist was an examiner for the University of the Cape of Good Hope in botany (1902-1903) and zoology (1903, 1912-1916). He was awarded a D.Sc. in 1905 by the University of Edinburgh and was appointed supervisor of marine studies at the South African College. In 1907, he was appointed professor of zoology at the South African College, replacing Arthur Dendy. His teaching assistant at that time was J. Stuart Thompson. He remained professor of zoology until shortly before his death in 1926.

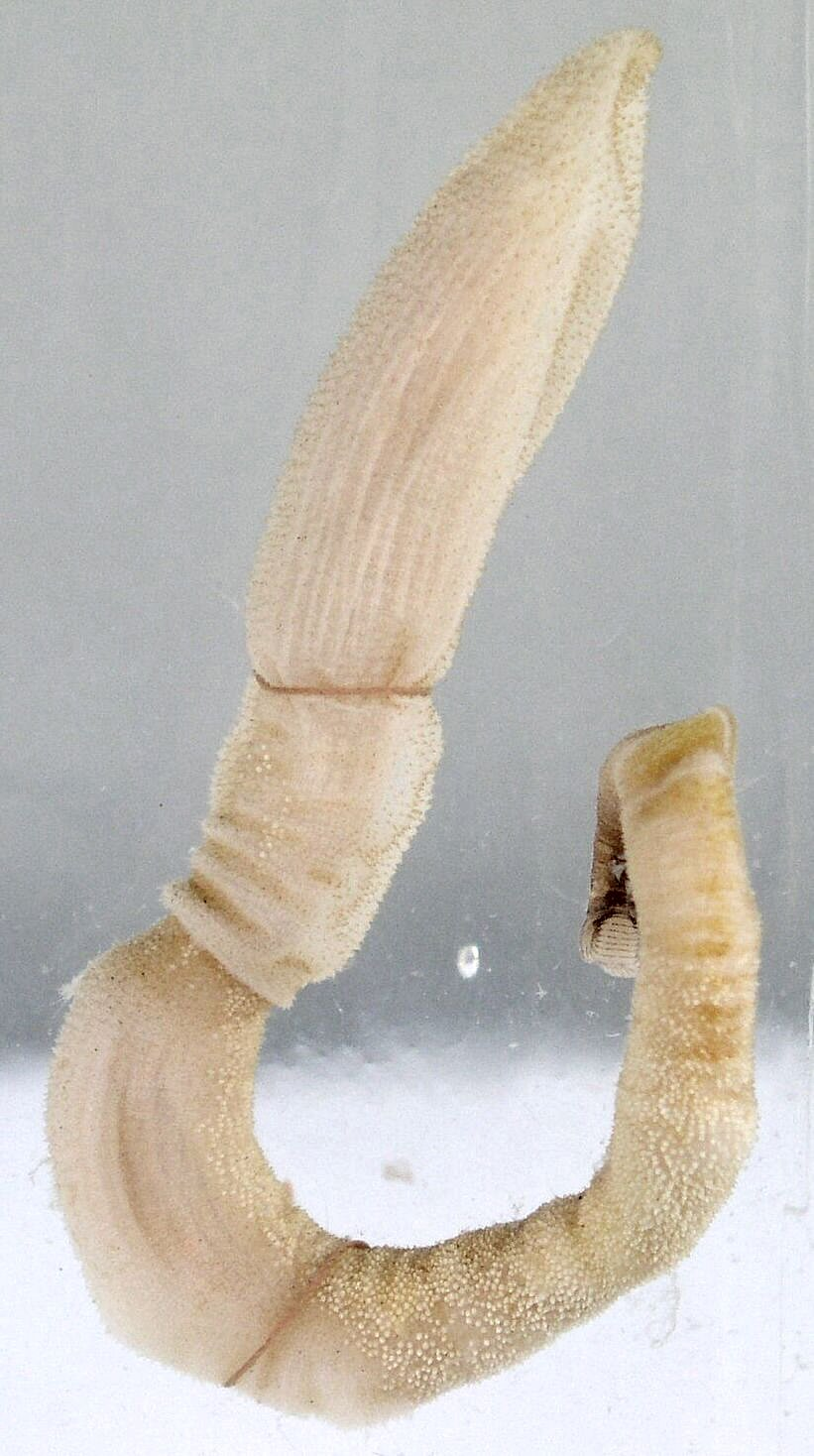
Hemichordate (Acorn worm)

In 1907, the post of Government Biologist was abolished, but Gilchrist continued to play an important role in the Department of Agriculture's marine survey as Chairman of the Fishery Advisory Board. In 1908, he described a new species of hemichordates. After 1910, he became director of the Fisheries Survey of the Union of South Africa. As fisheries advisor to the Cape Provincial Administration he compiled four Marine Biological Reports covering activities during the years 1912 to 1917.

Gilchrist resigned his position in December 1910, when a full-time curator of marine collections was appointed under the Union of South Africa. Together with his assistant, W.W. Thompson, Gilchrist published a comprehensive Catalogue of the sea fishes recorded from Natal in the Annals of the Durban Museum In 1918 he described a new genus of crawling medusa and investigated trematode parasites.

In 1920, Gilchrist led marine survey expeditions in a converted whaler, the Pickle. The expeditions went as far as Laurenço Marques to the east and Walvis Bay to the north. Amongst other discoveries were new trawling grounds for hake north-west of Cape Town. These discoveries were covered by the reports of the Fisheries and Marine Biological Survey for the years 1920 to 1925, issued by Gilchrist. In 1925, he discovered a new enteropneust.

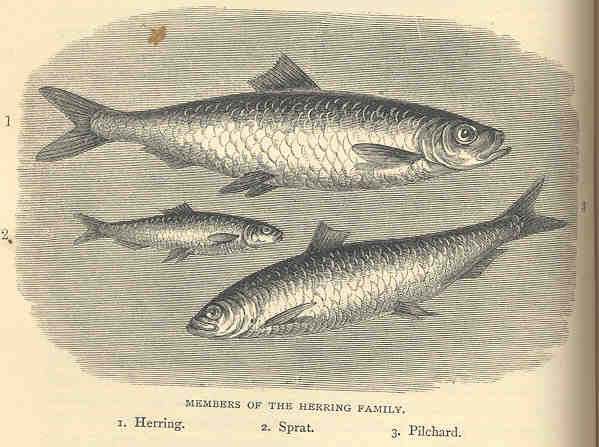
Members of the Herring Family.

He is the recognised authority for many genera and species of fish, such as Paralichthodes algoensis, the peppered flounder. His standard abbreviation under the International Code of Zoological Nomenclature is Gilchrist.

== Taxon named in his honor ==
- The genus Gilchristella, a member of the Clupeidae (herring) family, was named in 1935 in his honour.
- The Gilchrist's scorpionfish, Scorpaenopsis gilchristi (J. L. B. Smith, 1957) is named after him.

Gilchrist was modest and well-liked, although he had the reputation of being an absent-minded professor. He married Elfreda R. Raubenheimer, and they had one son and one daughter. He was forced to retire in 1926 owing to his failing health. He visited Europe in an effort to recover his health and returned to South Africa in July 1926. He died at the marine laboratory in St James, Cape Town, South Africa on 22 October 1926.

== Other scientific interests ==
Gilchrist was a member of the Meteorological Commission of the Cape of Good Hope from 1898 to 1908. In 1896, he joined the South African Philosophical Society (predecessor of Royal Society of South Africa) and served as its president, vice president and treasurer at various times. In 1908 when the Royal Society of South Africa was founded, Gilchrist was elected a foundation Fellow and served on its council (1908-1910) and as president (1918-1922).

He was a founding member of the South African Association for the Advancement of Science in 1902. In 1916, he became a foundation member of the South African Biological Society. He was a member of the Zoological Society of London, a fellow of the Linnean Society of London, and an honorary member of the Societe Centrale d'Aquiculture of Paris.

== Selected publications ==
Gilchrist contributed numerous scientific papers to the following journals, amongst others:

- Annals of the South African Museum,
- Transactions of the South African Philosophical Society,
- Transactions of the Royal Society of South Africa, and
- Reports of the South African Association for the Advancement of Science.

In 1905, he was joint editor with W. Flint of the journal Science in South Africa. He and Cecil von Bonde wrote Dissection of the platana and the frog (Cape Town, 1919) and Practical zoology for medical and junior students (Edinburgh 1922).

Other publications of note are:

- The Blenniidae of South Africa Part 2 of Volume 6 of the Annals of the South African Museum (Trustees of the South African Museum, 1908) (with William Wardlaw Thompson)
- South African Zoology. A Text Book for the Use of Students, Teachers and Others in South Africa (Cape Town and Pretoria, 1912)
- The Freshwater Fishes of South Africa: Volume 11, Parts 5-6 of Annals of the South African Museum (Trustees of the South African Museum, 1913) (with William Wardlaw Thompson)

== Taxon described by him ==
- See Category:Taxa named by John Dow Fisher Gilchrist
