= William Wardlaw Thompson =

South African ichthyologist and zoologist

- Died: 1917
- Education: South African College
- Scientific career
- Fields: Ichthyologist and zoologist

William Wardlaw Thompson (died 1917) was a South African ichthyologist and zoologist. It is known that he was educated at the South African College in Cape Town between 1858 and 1863 and that he obtained a post on the civil service of the Cape Colony in 1877 in the Railway Department as a temporary clerk. In January 1878 he secured a permanent post as a clerk in the Public Works Department, where he was promoted to First Clerk in 1882. In January 1885 he was transferred to the position of Chief records Clerk at the Crown Lands Office being promoted in July 1889 to first class clerk at the Department of Agriculture attaining the post of acting chief clerk there in November 1897. Prior to this he had taken and passed his Civil Service Law examinations and he also served with the Duke of Edinburgh's Own Volunteer Rifles in the Transkei during the 9th Frontier War in February to May 1879 and in Basutoland in September 1880 to March 1881 during the Basuto Gun War. Thompson was appointed to the Cape Colony's Fisheries Board in October 1897.

In 1905 he vacated his clerical post to take up the position of the assistant of the Scots zoologist John D.F. Gilchrist, who was the government biologist of the Cape Colony and the honorary curator of marine invertebrates at the South African Museum. Over the next decade he contributed to a number of important publications as Gilchrist's co-author. They had jointly completed a study of the local Klip fishes of the family Blenniidae in 1907. This was based on the large collection of specimens gained mainly by the South African Museum's aquarium at St James, Cape Town. This results of the study were published as "The Blenniidae of South Africa" 1908 in Part 2 of Volume 6 of the Annals of the South African Museum and two years after that Gilchrist and Thompson jointly presented a paper on "The Cape Klipfishes" at the annual congress of the South African Association for the Advancement of Science.

Also in 1907 Gilchrist and Thompson had commenced compiling a descriptive catalogue of the marine fishes of Natal and this was published as "Descriptions of fishes from the Natal coast", over four parts, also in the Annals of the South African Museum between 1908 and 1914 and ran to 190 pages. They also published the descriptions in the Annals of the Durban Museum between 1914 and 1917 entitled "A catalogue of the sea fishes recorded from Natal". In 1916 they also described four new species of South African fishes in the Marine Biological Report (No. 3) compiled by Gilchrist. Gilchrist and Thompson were the first South African zoologists to study the freshwater fish fauna of South Africa and to draw up a comprehensive catalogue. In 1911 they described three new species of freshwater fish in the Annals and Magazine of Natural History, and their catalogue, The Freshwater Fishes of South Africa included some 200 engravings, was published in three parts in Volume 11 parts 5-7 of the Annals of the South African Museum between 1913 and 1918.

Thompson wrote a book called The sea fisheries of the Cape Colony from Van Riebeeck's days to the eve of the Union which was published in 1913, this included chapters on the whale and seal fisheries, trout and other freshwater fishes, and oysters. He was a Fellow of both the Zoological Society of London and the Linnean Society, he was one of the founding members of the South African Association for the Advancement of Science in 1902 and by 1910 he was a member of the Royal Society of South Africa.

Taxon described by him

- See Category:Taxa named by William Wardlaw Thompson
