= Weedfish =

Weedfish may refer to:

- Adelaide's weedfish, (Heteroclinus adelaidae)
- Banded weedfish, (Heteroclinus fasciatus)
- Caledonian weedfish, (Springeratus caledonicus)
- Cline (weedfish), (Clinitrachus argentatus)
- Common weedfish, (Heteroclinus perspicillatus)
- Crested weedfish, (Cristiceps australis)
- Girls weedfish, (Heteroclinus puellarum)
- Golden weedfish, (Cristiceps aurantiacus)
- Johnston's weedfish, (Heteroclinus johnstoni)
- Kelp weedfish, (Heteroclinus eckloniae)
- Kuiters weedfish, (Heteroclinus kuiteri)
- Large eye weedfish, (Heteroclinus macrophthalmus)
- Large nose weedfish, (Heteroclinus nasutus)
- Natal weedfish, (Heteroclinus antinectes)
- Ogilby's weedfish, (Heteroclinus heptaeolus)
- Rosy weedfish, (Heteroclinus roseus)
- Sevenbar weedfish, (Heteroclinus equiradiatus)
- Sharp nose weedfish, (Heteroclinus tristis)
- Short tassel weedfish, (Heteroclinus flavescens)
- Silver-sided weedfish, (Cristiceps argyropleura)
- Slender weedfish, (Heteroclinus marmoratus)
- Whiteleggs weedfish, (Heteroclinus whiteleggii)
- Wilsons weedfish, (Heteroclinus wilsoni)
