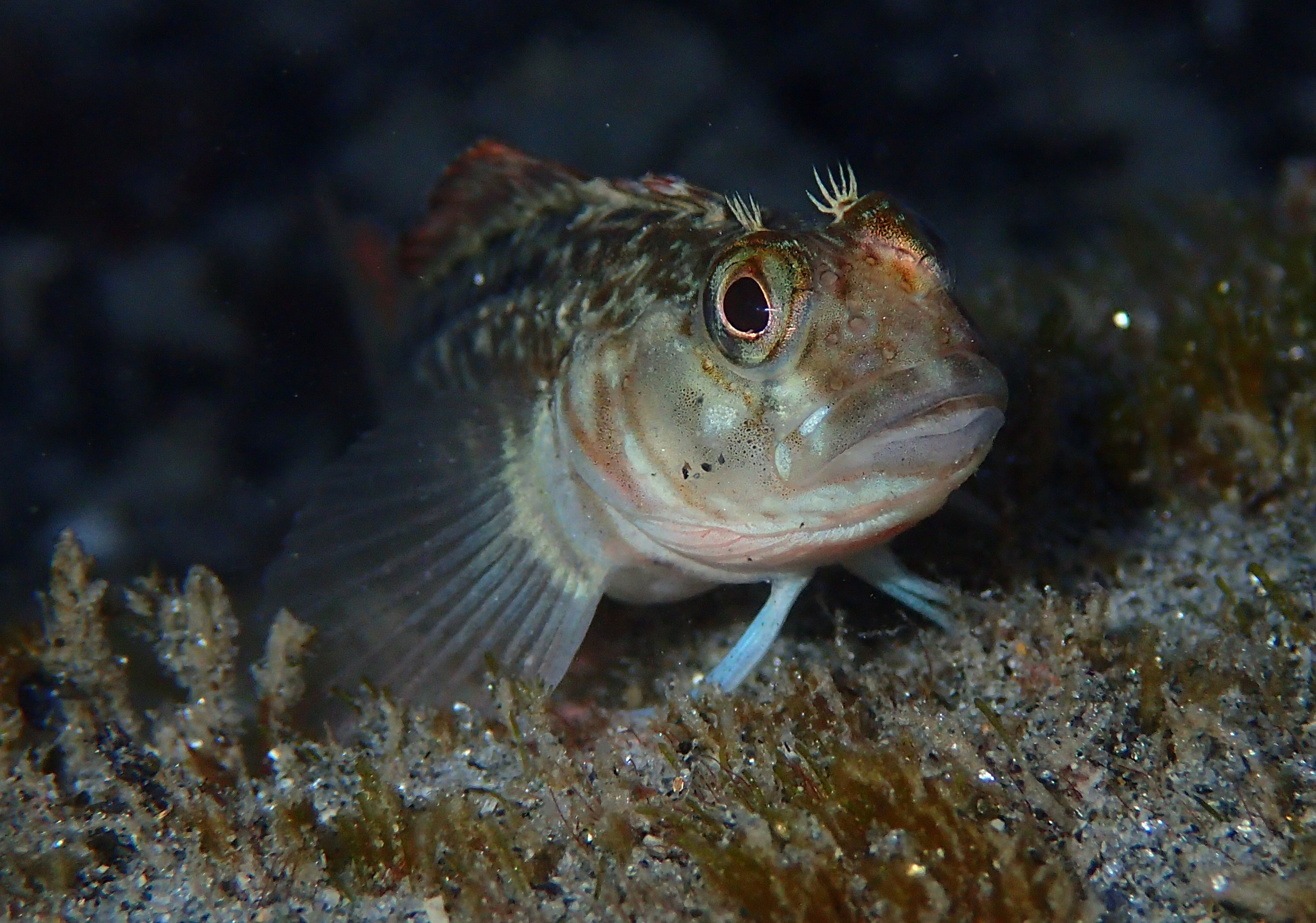
- Forsterygion gymnotum on seafloor at Mussel Point near Jackson Bay, CC-BY William Harland

Conservation status
- Least Concern (IUCN 3.1)

Scientific classification
- Kingdom: Animalia
- Phylum: Chordata
- Class: Actinopterygii
- Division: Teleostei
- Order: Blenniiformes
- Family: Tripterygiidae
- Genus: Forsterygion
- Species: F. gymnotum

Binomial name
- Forsterygion gymnotum Scott, 1977

Synonyms
- Grahamina gymnota Scott, 1977; Grahamina signata Fricke & Roberts, 1993

= Tasmanian robust triplefin =

Species of fish

Forsterygion gymnotum, commonly known as the robust triplefin, Tasmanian robust triplefin, bare-backed triplefin, multifid-tentacled robust triplefin, and the estuarine threefin in Australia is a type of triplefin fish belonging to the genus Forsterygion. It is one of twenty-seven triplefin species native to New Zealand but was first described in Tasmania in 1977 by Eric Oswald Scott.

== Description ==
Forsterygion gymnotum reaches up to 10 cm in length at sexual maturity. It is commonly misidentified as the common triplefin (Forsterygion lapillum) and mottled triplefin (Forsterygion capito) on iNaturalist; however, it can be distinguished by a steeper snout. Forsterygion gymnotum is highly variable in colouration, its head and body ranging from greenish-grey, to dark brown, and black. The upper body has dark brown or black blotches and it is paler ventrally, on the lower half of its body, with white-yellow spots on its lower flanks. Forsterygion gymnotum has light blotches on the base of its tail fin and a white-yellow arc at the base of the pectoral fins on its sides.

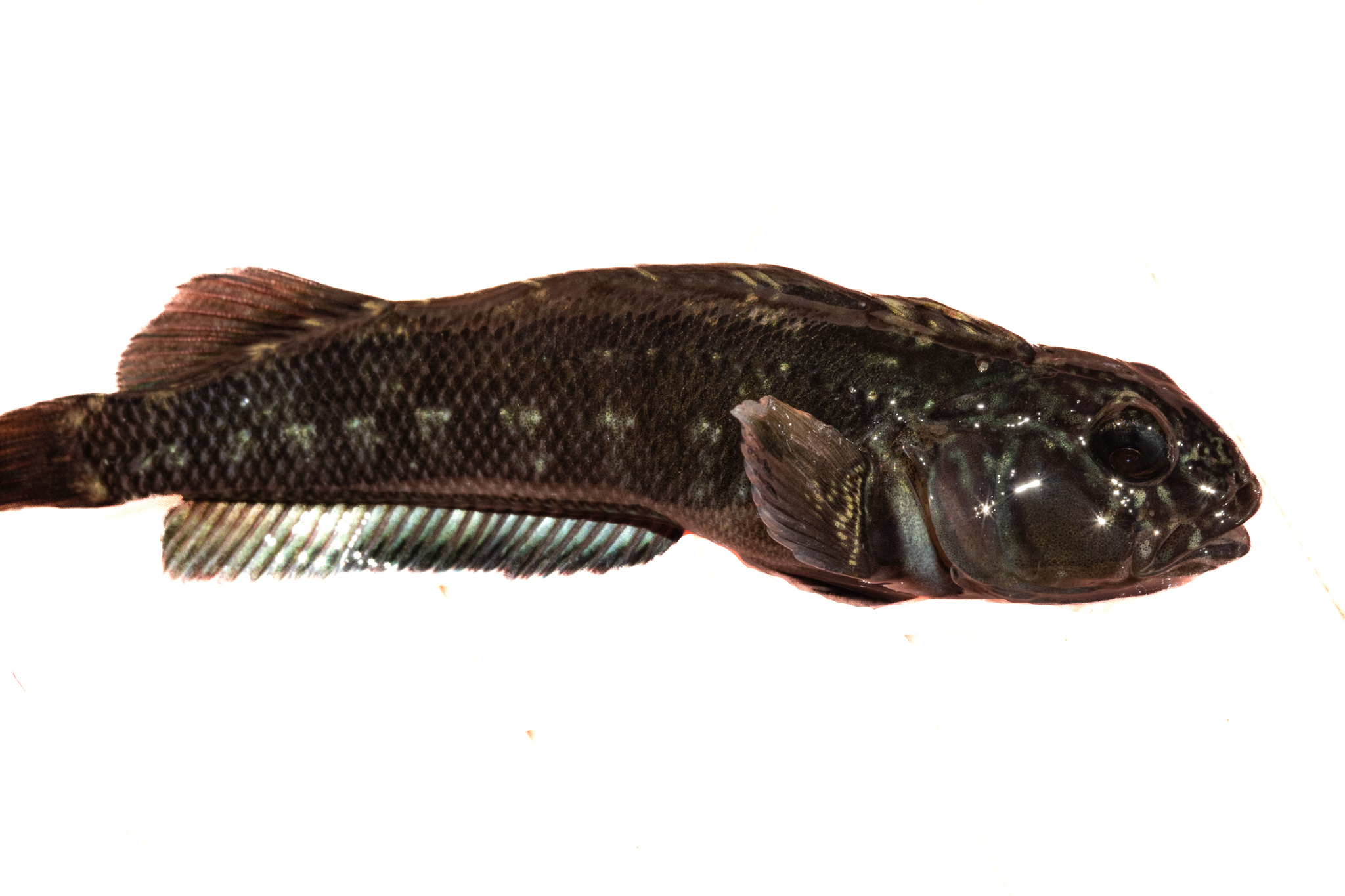
Forsterygion gymnotum male showing reproductive colouration

Forsterygion gymnotum exhibits some sexual dimorphism between mature males and females, as the head and body of males darkens, causing most of the blotched pattern to recede. The male dorsal and anal fins develop reddish-brown bands that are tipped with blue on the anal fins. The dorsal fins of male F. gymnotum also darken, becoming uniformly black on the largest individuals.

Forsterygion gymnotum has rounded dorsal fins along its back while the ventral fins along its underside are flat and thickened, allowing them to rest on the ocean floor in turbid conditions. The first dorsal fin is short, followed by the second dorsal fin which is much taller, with longer spines than the first, gradually decreasing in length similarly to the third. Forsterygion gymnotum has a wedge-shaped head with a pronounced notch above its eyes. A small tuft-like growth called a cirrus with 6-10 filaments is located above the eyes, assisting in the sensory detection of physical contact with its surroundings. Forsterygion gymnotum has a row of sharp, recurved teeth, and an inner row of longer, finer teeth which assist in the capture of small crustaceans. Superficial or embedded tooth-like ctenoid scales are located at the nape of the head, and the groove before the first dorsal fin contains cephalic sensory pores which detect vibrations and movement in the surrounding water.

== Taxonomy ==
The species name gymnotum is commonly misspelt as ‘gymnota’; however, this is the incorrect gender spelling. In 1993, Ronald Fricke and Clive Roberts created the genus Grahamina, separating it from Forsterygion based on morphological traits only seen in sexually active males. In 2008, the genus Grahamina was labeled as a synonym of Forsterygion, and species including Forsterygion gymnotum were placed back within the Forsterygion genus. Grahamina signata was considered a separate but similar species to Forsterygion gymnotum until the traits used to distinguish the species were deemed variable between individuals and therefore unreliable. Before this, it was widely accepted Forsterygion gymnotum was only found in Australia, while Grahamina signata was its closely related sister species in New Zealand.

== Range ==
=== Wild global range ===
Despite its discovery in Tasmania, Forsterygion gymnotum is a New Zealand native species introduced to Australia. Forsterygion gymnotum was introduced to the Hobart region and remains restricted to artificial coastal environments such as wharves and jetties in South-Eastern Tasmania. The presence of other New Zealand endemic species, including Metacarcinus novaezelandiae and Patiriella regularis in these artificial Tasmanian environments, provides evidence these species were accidentally translocated to Tasmania by New Zealand shipments of oysters.

=== New Zealand range ===
Forsterygion gymnotum is one of eight New Zealand endemic Forsterygion species, all of which are found abundantly throughout coastal regions of New Zealand. Forsterygion gymnotum is found along the coastlines of the North and South Island mainlands and the Antipodes, Auckland, and Chatham offshore islands. This species has not been recorded in Western Southland or Northern Canterbury to Banks Peninsula, which are exceptions to its widespread distribution in New Zealand. Forsterygion gymnotum has been recorded at depths from 0 to 10 metres in turbulent waters.

== Habitat ==
Forsterygion gymnotum is a benthic species commonly found in exposed coastal areas with turbulent water. This includes rocky reefs with high waves and bays with fast flowing water. The sedentary behaviour and modified lower fins of triplefins allow them to rest on the substratum to avoid being swept away.

One study found 70% of F. gymnotum specimens residing in rocky substratum, as well as cobble, mud, and macroalgae in significantly lower frequencies. Forsterygion gymnotum is also commonly associated with macroinvertebrates such as mussels and ascidians which offer shelter and hiding spots from predators. A mussel farm located 2 km offshore from Collingwood recorded high numbers of Forsterygion gymnotum, far from the species’ natural range in shallower waters near the coast. This population was demersal, living in mussel lines near the sea floor instead of its usual seafloor habitat.

== Ecology ==
=== Life cycle and phenology ===
Eggs of Forsterygion gymnotum are salmon pink in colour and are laid in a single layer, with an average diameter of 1.13 mm. The eggs attach to substrates with elastic extensions of the egg’s outer membrane called filaments. Monitored eggs within clusters were at different stages of growth, providing evidence of F. gymnotum serial spawning. Serial spawning occurs over one spawning season, where eggs mature at different rates, resulting in larvae hatching at different times. How long eggs take to hatch is unknown.

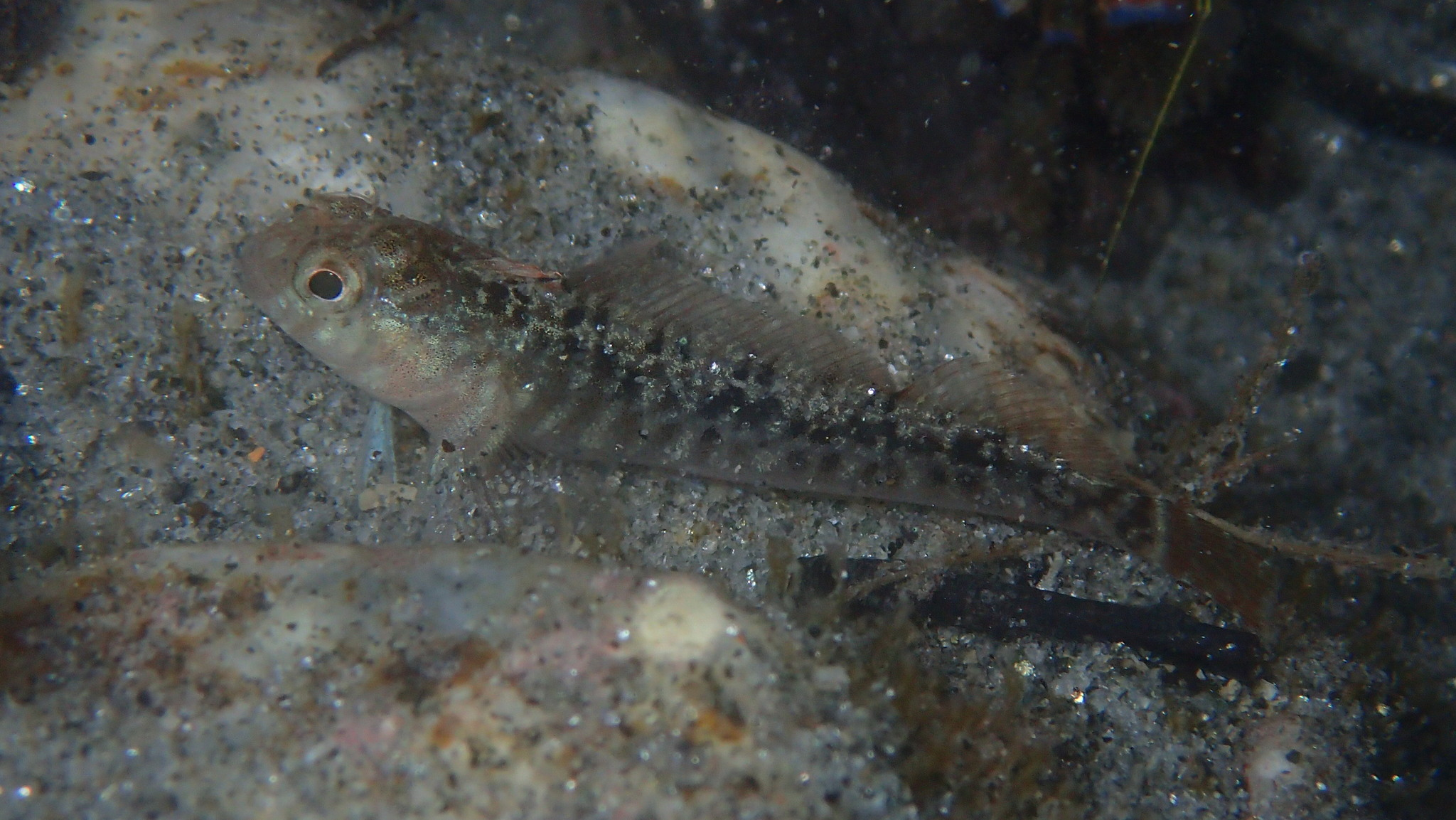
Forsterygion gymnotum juvenile resting on substratum, CC-BY William Harland

Once hatched, Forsterygion gymnotum enters the yolk sac larvae stage of growth which it will remain in until the yolk sac has been absorbed. These larvae are identical to other yolk sac larvae within the Tripterygiidae family, displaying a distinct gallbladder and reaching between 6.1 mm and 6.4 mm in length. Forsterygion gymnotum larvae are pelagic, swimming in the water column for an average of 68 days before settling on the bottom as juveniles. Juvenile triplefins grow rapidly, reaching sexual maturity within a year.

Despite the abundance of F. gymnotum throughout New Zealand, little research has been conducted on the mature stages of its lifecycle. Triplefin species tend to live between 2–3 years in warmer North Island waters but can live up to five years in the south.

Breeding season begins in autumn for triplefin fish. Males darken in colouration to show they are ready to breed to attract mates. Male triplefins become territorial during breeding season, defending their nests from other males which try to steal their protected site. External fertilization occurs within the nest, with males fertilizing eggs as females lay them. Nests of Forsterygion gymnotum have been found tended to by a single adult. One breeding season occurs per year for F. gymnotum; however, breeding can occur several times during this period, and larvae will hatch at different times due to serial spawning.

=== Diet and foraging ===
Forsterygion gymnotum is a carnivorous, active hunter of crustaceans such as small crabs and barnacles, and other small invertebrates. Triplefins are capable of bursts of speed to catch prey, which they actively search for along the substratum. In captivity, F. gymnotum larvae have been recorded to actively feed on rotifers.

=== Predators, parasites and diseases ===
No research has been conducted on specific predators of Forsterygion gymnotum, nor to its parasites. However, its abundance throughout New Zealand suggests it plays an integral part in the food chain of coastal ecosystems. General predators of triplefin species include large fish such as eels, John dory, and blue cod.

== Other Information ==
=== Interesting Scientific Information ===
It is unusual that speciation has occurred within the Forsterygion genus given the lack of geographic isolation between species which are all found throughout New Zealand. The selection pressures that lead to this diverse range of triplefins is unknown, as many fill similar ranges and niches as benthic predators of invertebrates. The abundance of triplefins throughout New Zealand is likely due to the absence of other small fish such as blennies and weed fish, which fill similar niches in other coastlines of the world.

=== Conservation Status ===
Forsterygion gymnotum was listed as least concern on the IUCN Red List of Threatened Species, its status last assessed in 2010.
