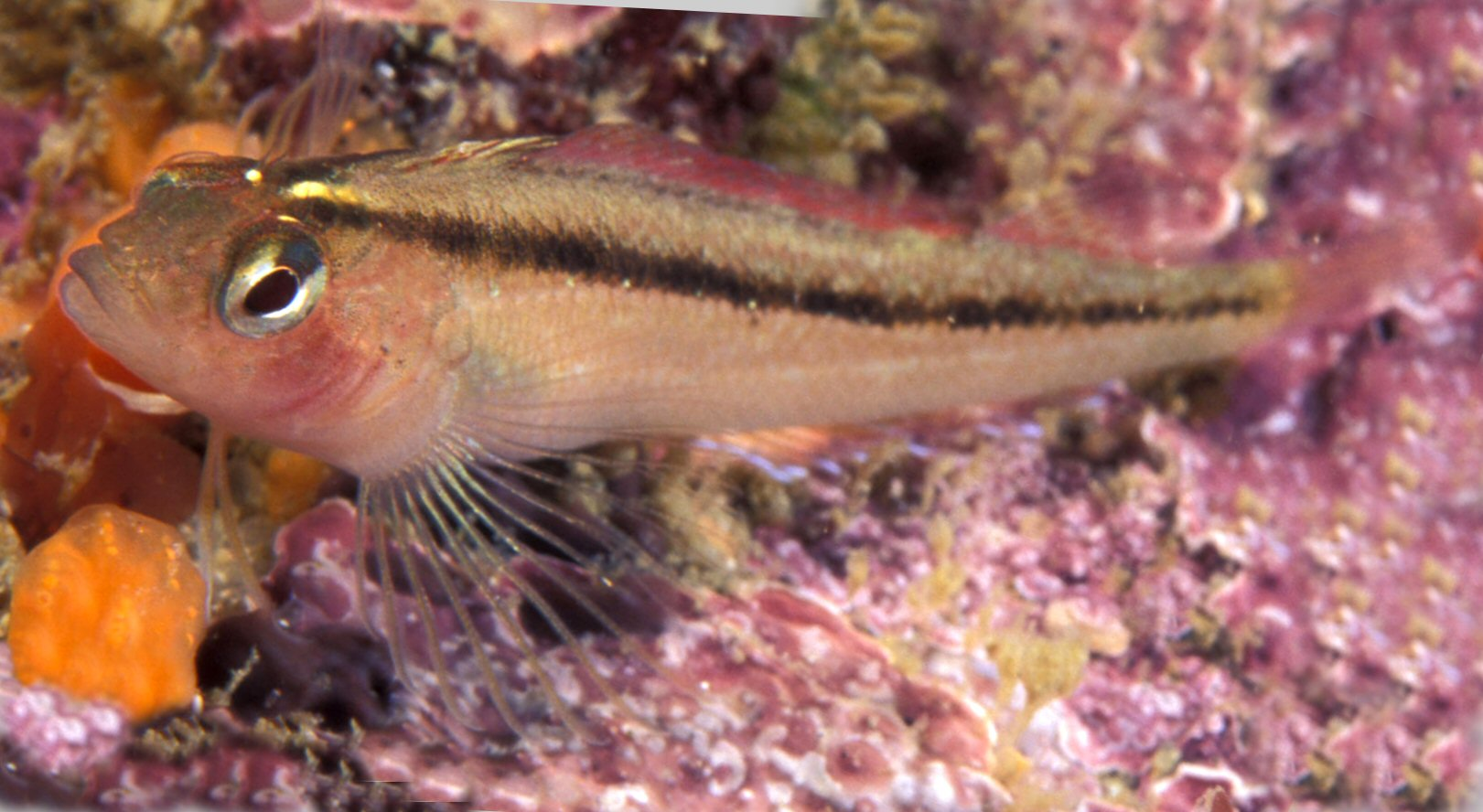

Conservation status
- Least Concern (IUCN 3.1)

Scientific classification
- Kingdom: Animalia
- Phylum: Chordata
- Class: Actinopterygii
- Division: Teleostei
- Order: Blenniiformes
- Family: Tripterygiidae
- Genus: Forsterygion
- Species: F. lapillum

Binomial name
- Forsterygion lapillum Hardy, 1989

= Common triplefin =

Species of New Zealand fish

The common triplefin (Forsterygion lapillum) is a small blennioid fish of the family Tripterygiidae. It is one of 26 endemic species of triplefin found in New Zealand across 14 genera. This species is very common in the temperate coastal and intertidal waters of New Zealand where it often lives in cobble habitats, but has been found as deep as 30 m. It has a maximum body length of around 70 mm and lives for up to three years.

Common triplefins are generally opportunistic predators, eating mostly amphipods, ostracods, limpets, and polychaetes. Males will aggressively defend their territory during the breeding season as well as guard eggs after they are laid by females, who contribute no parental care.

== Description ==
Common triplefin sexes are similar in appearance for most of their reproductive cycle, though there is some morphological diversity between populations. Both sexes usually have dappled light brown colouration and white undersides outside of the breeding season, but the sides of females and younger males may have a longitudinal black stripe. This stripe is much fainter in South Island populations, and colouration tends to be darker in fish from more southern locations. When males are reproductively active, their bodies turn completely black and the anal fins gain a pale blue streak. The common triplefin is one of the smaller triplefins in family Tripterygiidae, reaching a maximum of 70 mm in length. Its maximum lifespan has been recorded at up to three years, shorter than most other triplefins, with individuals reaching mature sizes within a year of hatching.

== Distribution and habitat ==
The common triplefin is found across most of New Zealand's mainland coastline, but can also much less frequently be found on offshore islands and has been introduced in Australia. It is most abundant in subtidal depths up to 5 m, and unlike most other New Zealand triplefins who prefer higher amounts of cover, it occupies a wide range of levels of shelter. The fish can occasionally occupy intertidal rock pools during low tides, but this is thought to be temporary and has not been associated with reproductive activity like its usual habitat. Habitats are most densely occupied by adult fish just prior to the breeding season, and populations gradually become more sparse as adults spread out again after its end. Adults occupy similar habitats to juveniles in terms of depth and substrate. However, the pattern of distribution density across different maturity levels changes with the number of adults in the habitat; while the amount of juveniles will initially increase alongside the amount of adults in a location, this relationship eventually flips and the number of juveniles will decrease with any additional adults. The decrease in juveniles is partly due to cannibalism of smaller juveniles as adult density increases, and potentially competition with adults or less effective camouflage causing increased predation. The initial positive relationship between juvenile and adult density could be the result of settling juveniles using the number of adults as an indicator of habitat quality.

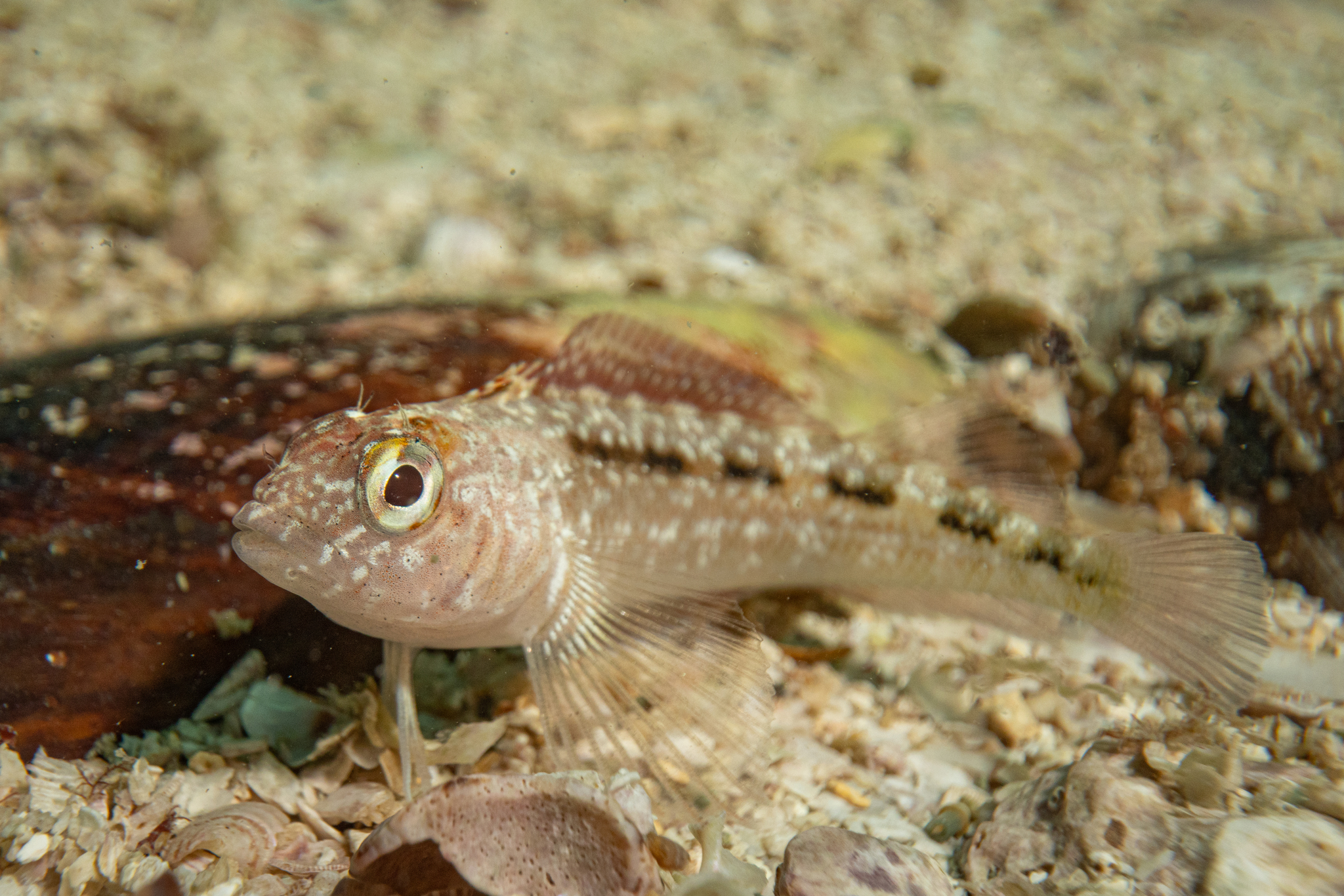
Common triplefin in sand and cobble substrate

Substrate containing cobble and gravel are common habitats for this species. Settling juveniles have a strong preference for locations containing Cystophora retroflexa and Cystophora torulosa algae. This preference is potentially a limiting factor for the number of common triplefin within a given population, with these specific algae species providing food, cover, or a combination of both for the developing juveniles.

Common triplefins are one of the least specialised New Zealand triplefins in relation to habitat, utilising a wide variety of substrates, depths, and cover levels. This lack of specificity may help them by allowing them to occupy whichever microhabitat is unused by other triplefins in their surroundings, letting multiple species coexist together without competing. It has also been suggested that habitat selection in New Zealand triplefins might act as a "magic trait," where a reproductive barrier to gene flow is created by traits under ecological selection. Here, despite the potential gene flow between populations of triplefins, the ecological boundary of habitat selection created reproductive isolation between groups. This allowed for speciation to occur based on which fish were inhabiting different, highly specific habitats.

== Behaviour ==
The common triplefin is often used for laboratory work on fish physiology and behaviour, as it can remain calm but still active enough to move around and engage with tasks while in experimental conditions. They are also easy to observe in a natural setting due to their lack of skittishness, and so are a popular study species for multiple types of research.

=== Feeding ===
The common triplefin shares a similar diet with Yaldwyn's triplefin, the blue-eyed triplefin, the yellow-and-black triplefin, the blue dot triplefin, and the cryptic triplefin, with these species all having a diet consisting mostly of gammarid amphipods, ostracods, limpets, and errant polychaetes. The common triplefin was additionally found to eat a significant amount of caddisflies and sphaeromatid isopods, potentially due to their increased intertidal presence.

The feeding behaviour of common triplefins is predatory, with individuals stalking their prey. They will make a brief pause before launching towards it, generally swallowing the animal whole. However, feeding does seem to be largely opportunistic, with individuals usually moving after whichever food is closest to them rather than making the effort to hunt any one specific prey type.

The best predictors of dietary preference in New Zealand triplefins are habitat—such as with common triplefins eating species present in intertidal zones—as well as body size. Jaw morphology could explain the body size factor; the common triplefin is a smaller triplefin and as such has a shorter jawbone and tooth length than other, larger triplefin species such as the giant triplefin (twice the size of the common triplefin). This difference in morphology may be preventing them from consuming larger prey items that are more present in the diet of larger fish.

In contrast to adults, juveniles spend much less time moving around. Instead of pursuing prey, they will feed on whichever organic matter is near to them, consisting mostly of invertebrates and other particles in the water column. Common triplefin larvae have been found to have significantly more red muscle and smaller white muscles fibres than adults. This physiological difference suggests that larvae have an increased reliance on slower, sustained movement, as compared to the adults which rely on quick bursts of movement to capture prey.

Common triplefins have been proposed to act as facultative cleaner fish, eating parasites from the bodies of bigger fish, but this has not actually been observed in literature.

=== Breeding ===
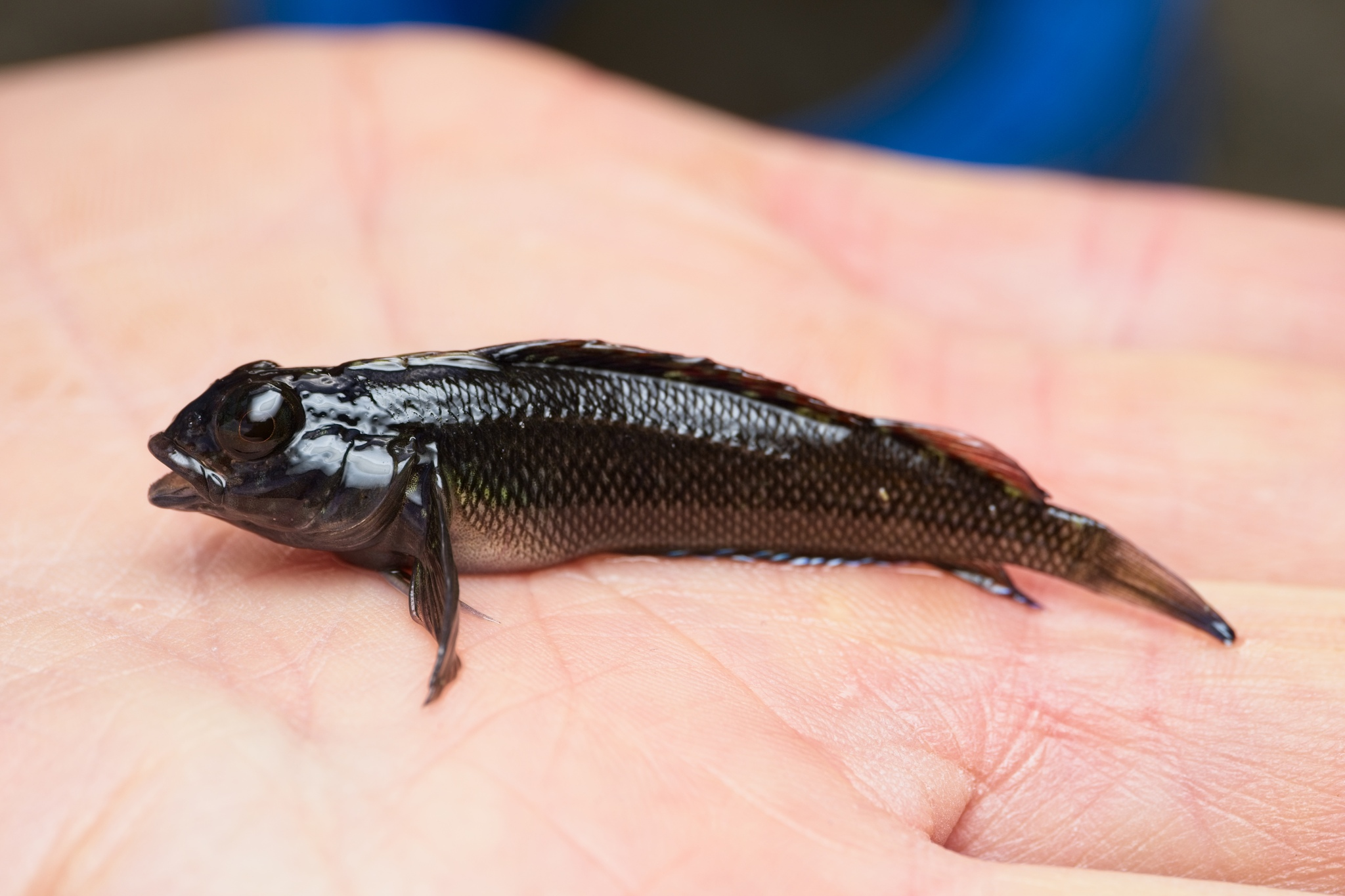
Male common triplefin showing reproductive colouration

The common triplefin's reproductive cycle typically begins in late winter and ends in early summer, although this can change from location to location. In Wellington alone, the breeding season has been recorded as running from August to November, September to December, and July to February, suggesting great variability between years. The males will firstly take on their reproductive colouration, and begin aggressively defending territories from other males as well as courting females. After choosing a male, females will lay large egg masses in the male's territory, most often under sloped surfaces of rocks and other structures. Multiple females may lay eggs in one male's territory over the course of the initial breeding period. The male will then guard the eggs, up to 2000 in total, for two to three weeks until they hatch. Larvae will spend around 52 days in the water column before settling.

Male common triplefins are less specific about habitat choice, and more likely to choose a territory with less coverage than other New Zealand triplefins. This lack of shelter may not only aid in easing competition between species, but also help them to attract more females to their nest. By having their nest out in the open, there is potential for them to be visited by higher numbers of females, even if they have to invest more into the defence of their territory from both other males and predators looking to eat their eggs.

==== Male competition and female choice ====
Aggressive interactions between male common triplefins are usually limited to just the breeding season, and more specifically to territory defence. As such, these interactions are initiated the vast majority of times by the male holding the territory against an encroaching male. Escalated aggression involves chasing and biting on the dorsal fin, but males have also been recorded engaging in less physically aggressive displays. Some males have been observed displaying "lateral threats," where the aggressive male will spread its fins and show its side to the other. Similarly, males have been described swimming alongside each other with their fins spread, with some fish occasionally quickly beating their bodies back and forth; in this instance, the losing male is the one that turns away first.

This male intrasexual competition is centred around holding and defending high-quality territories, as female common triplefins will use territory quality as an indicator of male quality when choosing a mate. Males show an increase in aggression levels after they have taken hold of valuable resources, which supports both the explanation of territory defence being behind the common triplefin's aggressive behaviours and the premise of game theory (wherein in this case aggression is proportionate to the value of the resources that the animal is defending).

Male parental care is the driving factor behind female choice of mates in common triplefins, as the males will guard the eggs up until they hatch. Because the females are investing so much into producing hundreds of eggs, it is in their best interest to select a male who will be able to defend them effectively. In this and other species with male parental care, females will tend to judge a male more on his ability to defend the young by his resources rather than his own traits, as this is the main predictor of the offspring's survivability. Males aggressively defending territories allows females to not only examine the quality of their territory's resources, but also the ability of that male to aggressively defend their eggs. However, male common triplefins will also perform courtship rituals; these consist of "lead displays," where the male will overemphasise his movements and swim between the nest and the female in a figure of eight, and "lateral displays," where the male shows the side of his body and spreads his dorsal fins.

==== Body size and condition ====
Unlike in other closely related species of triplefin, female common triplefins do not prefer males with larger bodies when they are isolated from their territories. Instead, male body size in the common triplefin is associated with the ability of the male to hold his territory against other males. Male body condition, however, is associated with female choice. Males with a better body condition are less likely to both eat their own eggs for sustenance or abandon their clutches to search for food. These qualities make them preferable to females, who do not contribute parental care and so after laying have no control over the behaviour of the male safeguarding their eggs. Because of these factors, both body size and body condition are predictors of male reproductive success.

Hatch date and growth speed may both be important mediators of adult male size, as common triplefins can have as much as a nine-month gap between the earliest and latest hatched larvae of the season. Males that hatch earlier in the breeding season tend to have greater body sizes during the next breeding season and greater reproductive success, as well as higher territoriality. These relationships may not solely be due to female choice, as other reef species have shown that juvenile fish settling earlier in after the breeding season are less likely to be the subject of aggressive behaviour from other competing species. However, males that hatched later in the season have higher growth rates on average, likely to counteract the extra time that earlier-hatched males had to grow. By doing so, they may be sacrificing reproduction to some extent, perhaps even skipping their first reproductive season to instead focus on growth.

=== Adaptations to global warming ===
Common triplefins are able to tolerate a wide range of temperatures, and can comfortably adapt to temperatures between 15 °C and 21 °C. In fact, common triplefins show a preference for habitat with a temperature of 20–21 °C over cooler environments. As ocean temperature continues to increase with global warming, it is possible that the common triplefin may shift its preferred habitat to warmer regions of New Zealand as waters disproportionately heat. This preference has only been shown in a laboratory setting, and so may be mediated by other factors that change with habitat temperature, preventing large-scale habitat shift. When temperatures reach 24 °C, both the aerobic metabolic scope and growth fitness begin to decrease. In contrast to temperatures of 21 °C, decline in functioning at 24 °C may affect the ability of the common triplefin to thrive in warming waters. As a result, their habitat could shift out of the intertidal and into more temperature-stable sub-tidal regions. Because the common triplefin is so widespread around New Zealand and makes up a prominent part of the intertidal and shallow benthic ecosystem, this habitat shift as well as a potential range shift to higher latitudes may have run-on effects for other organisms and processes.
