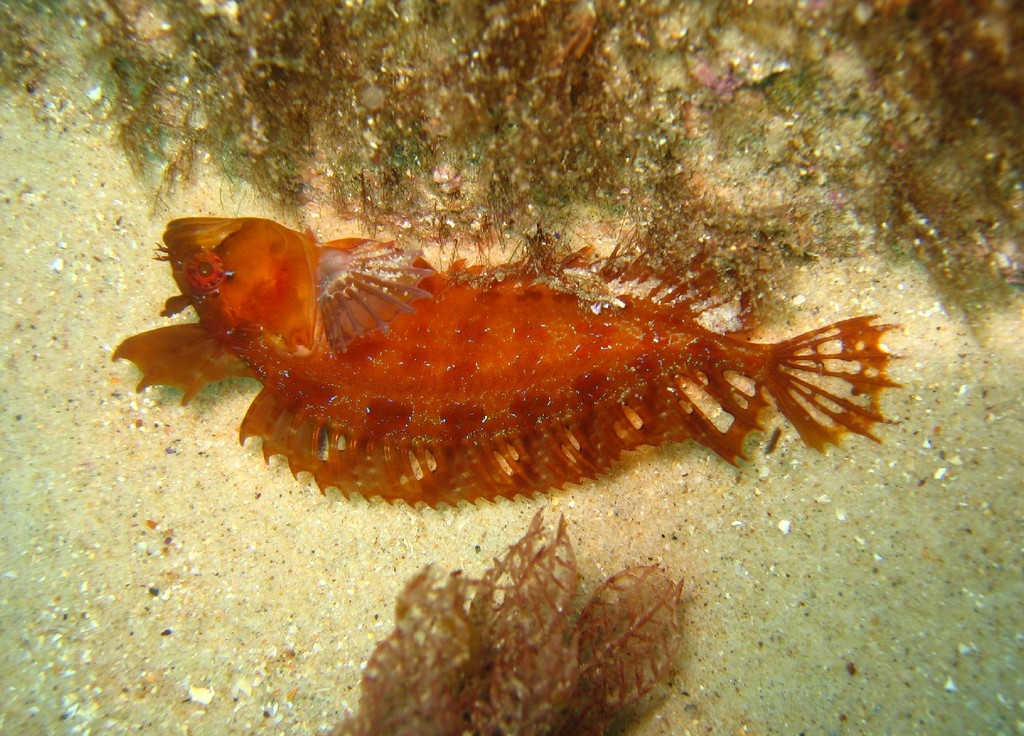
- Rosy Weedfish (H. roseus)

Scientific classification
- Domain: Eukaryota
- Kingdom: Animalia
- Phylum: Chordata
- Class: Actinopterygii
- Order: Blenniiformes
- Family: Clinidae
- Genus: Heteroclinus; Castelnau, 1872

Type species
- Heteroclinus adelaidae Castelnau, 1872

Synonyms
- Neoblennius Castelnau, 1875; Petraites Ogilby, 1885

= Heteroclinus =

Genus of fishes

Heteroclinus is a genus of clinids found in the western Indo-Pacific.

== Species ==
There are currently 16 recognized species in this genus:

- Heteroclinus adelaidae Castelnau, 1872 (Adelaide's weedfish)
- Heteroclinus antinectes (Günther, 1861) (Natal weedfish)
- Heteroclinus eckloniae (McKay, 1970) (Kelp weedfish)
- Heteroclinus equiradiatus (Milward, 1960) (Sevenbar weedfish)
- Heteroclinus heptaeolus (J. D. Ogilby, 1885) (Ogilby's weedfish)
- Heteroclinus johnstoni (Saville-Kent, 1886) (Johnston's weedfish)
- Heteroclinus kuiteri Hoese & Rennis, 2006
- Heteroclinus macrophthalmus Hoese, 1976 (Large-eye weedfish)
- Heteroclinus marmoratus (Klunzinger, 1872) (Slender weedfish)
- Heteroclinus nasutus, (Günther, 1861) (Large-nose weedfish)
- Heteroclinus perspicillatus (Valenciennes, 1836) (Common weedfish)
- Heteroclinus puellarum (E. O. G. Scott, 1955) (Little weedfish)
- Heteroclinus roseus (Günther, 1861) (Rosy weedfish)
- Heteroclinus tristis (Klunzinger, 1872) (Sharp-nose weedfish)
- Heteroclinus whiteleggii (J. D. Ogilby, 1894) (Whitelegg's weedfish)
- Heteroclinus wilsoni (A. H. S. Lucas, 1891) (Wilson's weedfish)
