= Heteroclinus kuiteri =

Conservation status
- Least Concern (IUCN 3.1)

Scientific classification
- Kingdom: Animalia
- Phylum: Chordata
- Class: Actinopterygii
- Order: Blenniiformes
- Family: Clinidae
- Genus: Heteroclinus
- Species: H. kuiteri

Binomial name
- Heteroclinus kuiteri Hoese & Rennis, 2006

Species of fish

Heteroclinus kuiteri, or Kuiters weedfish, is a species of clinid native to the Indian Ocean coast of Australia.

== Etymology ==
Heteroclinus kuiteri was described by Douglas F. Hoese and Denise S. Rennis in 2006. The specific epithet "kuiteri" refers to Rudie Kuiter, who is credited by the authors with providing a substantial amount of material on other Australian clinids.

== Description ==
Male Heteroclinus kuiteri can reach a maximum length of 6 centimetres (2.4 in) SL. The colouration of the blennies varies, with both male and female bodies being primarily brown. The blennies are sometimes uniformly brown in colour, but can also possess a white-brown mottled band from the eyes to the tail, or approximately 8 dark brown bands along the body (most frequently shown in females), which become darker on the back.

Hoese and Rennis describe H. kuiteri as being most closely related to its sister taxon H. adelaidae and H. macrophthalmus, with all three species possessing a broad membrane connecting the anal ray to the caudal peduncle.

== Distribution ==
Heteroclinus kuiteri is a subtropical blenny found from southern to western Australia, in the eastern Indian Ocean, Blennies in this species dwell in shallow waters in the presence of rocks and weeds. The blennies are known to swim at a depth range of 5–13 metres, and have also been reported to swim at about 15 metres deep.
