= Microcotyle brevis =

Scientific classification
- Kingdom: Animalia
- Phylum: Platyhelminthes
- Class: Monogenea
- Order: Mazocraeidea
- Family: Microcotylidae
- Genus: Microcotyle
- Species: M. brevis

Binomial name
- Microcotyle brevis Dillon & Hargis, 1965

Species of worms

Microcotyle brevis is a species of monogenean, parasitic on the gills of a marine fish. It belongs to the family Microcotylidae.

== Taxonomy ==
Microcotyle brevis was first described by Dillon & Hargis in 1965, based on one specimen from the gills of striped triplefin, Forsterygion varium. Dillon & Hargis (1965) noted the need for a study of this species based on more adequate material due to the contracted nature of the single specimen used for the description and thus the limitations of the given measurement. The type and only specimen of Microcotyle brevis was inadvertently destroyed during shipment to the U. S. National Museum.

== Morphology ==
Microcotyle brevis has the general morphology of all species of Microcotyle, with a body comprising an anterior part which contains most organs and a posterior part called the haptor. The haptor is symmetrical, extending nearly to the level of the genital atrium and bears 60 clamps similar in structure and dissimilar in size, arranged as two rows, one on each side. The clamps of the haptor attach the animal to the gill of the fish. There are also two buccal suckers at the anterior extremity, provided with minute sclerotized tooth-like papillae. The digestive organs include an anterior, terminal mouth, a pharynx, a relatively short oesophagus and a posterior intestine bifurcating at the level of the genital atrium in two lateral branches provided with numerous secondary branches. Each adult contains male and female reproductive organs. The reproductive organs include an anterior genital atrium, armed with numerous very spines, a medio-dorsal vagina, a single ovary and 2-3 postovarian testes which are posterior to the ovary. The egg is provided with filaments at both ends.

== Diagnosis ==
Microcotyle brevis differs from other congeners by body size, the haptor coinciding with the greater part of the body proper, and by the number of testes.

== Hosts and localities ==
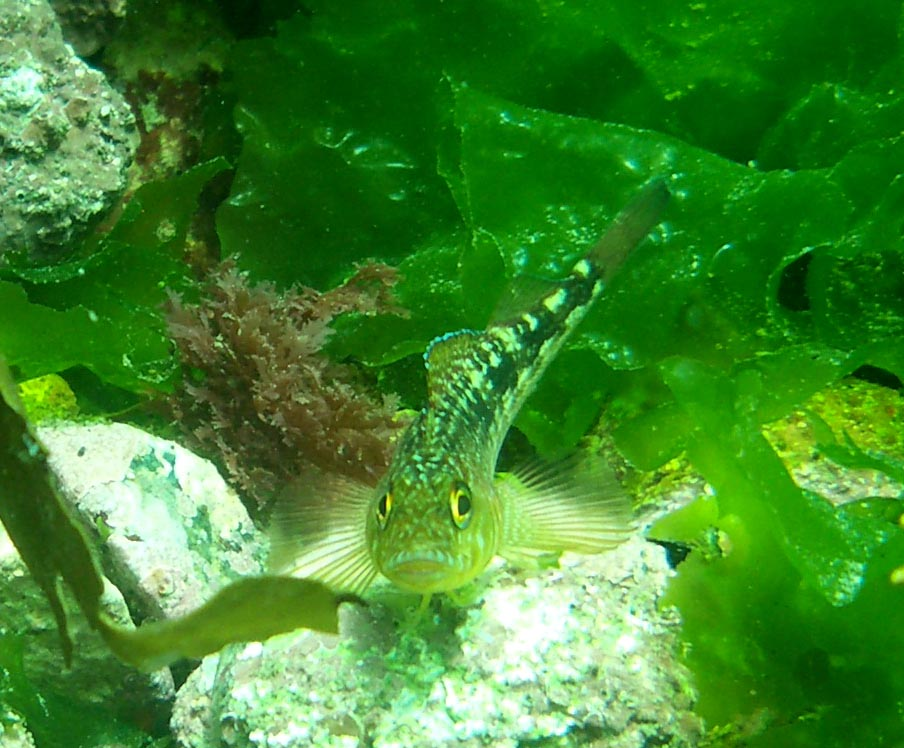
The striped triplefin Forsterygion varium is the type-host of Microcotyle brevis

The type-host is the striped triplefin, Forsterygion varium (Tripterygiidae). The type-locality is Akaroa off New Zealand.
