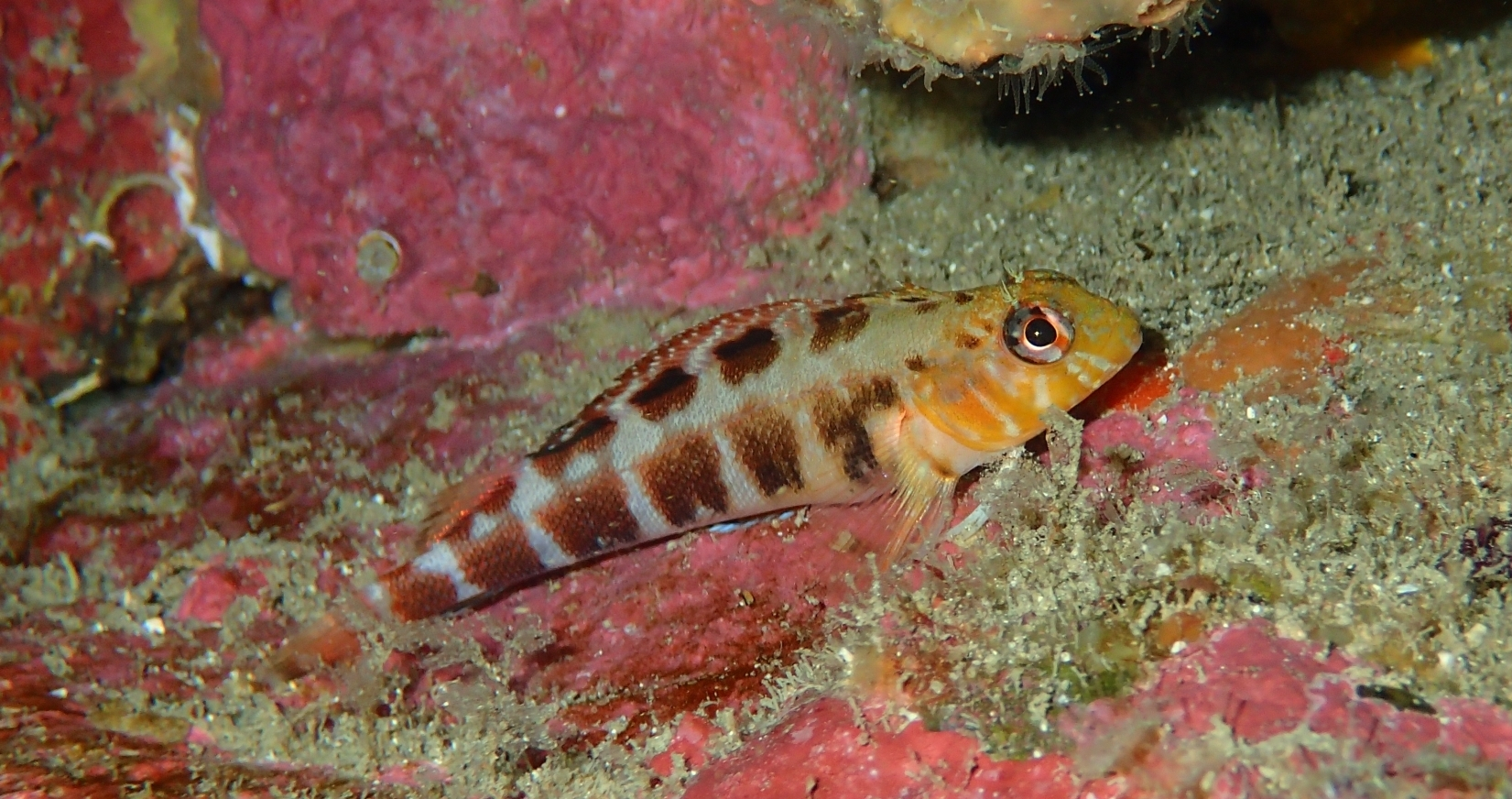
- A mottled triplefin seen off the coast of Little Barrier Island in the Hauraki Gulf, New Zealand

Conservation status
- Least Concern (IUCN 3.1)

Scientific classification
- Kingdom: Animalia
- Phylum: Chordata
- Class: Actinopterygii
- Order: Blenniiformes
- Family: Tripterygiidae
- Genus: Forsterygion
- Species: F. malcolmi

Binomial name
- Forsterygion malcolmi Hardy, 1987

= Mottled triplefin =

Species of fish

The mottled triplefin (Forsterygion malcolmi) is a triplefin of the genus Forsterygion, found around New Zealand at depths down to 30 m, in reef areas of broken rock. Its specific name honours Malcolm Francis of the Fisheries Research Centre in Wellington, New Zealand, who joined Hardy on his trips to collect specimens.
