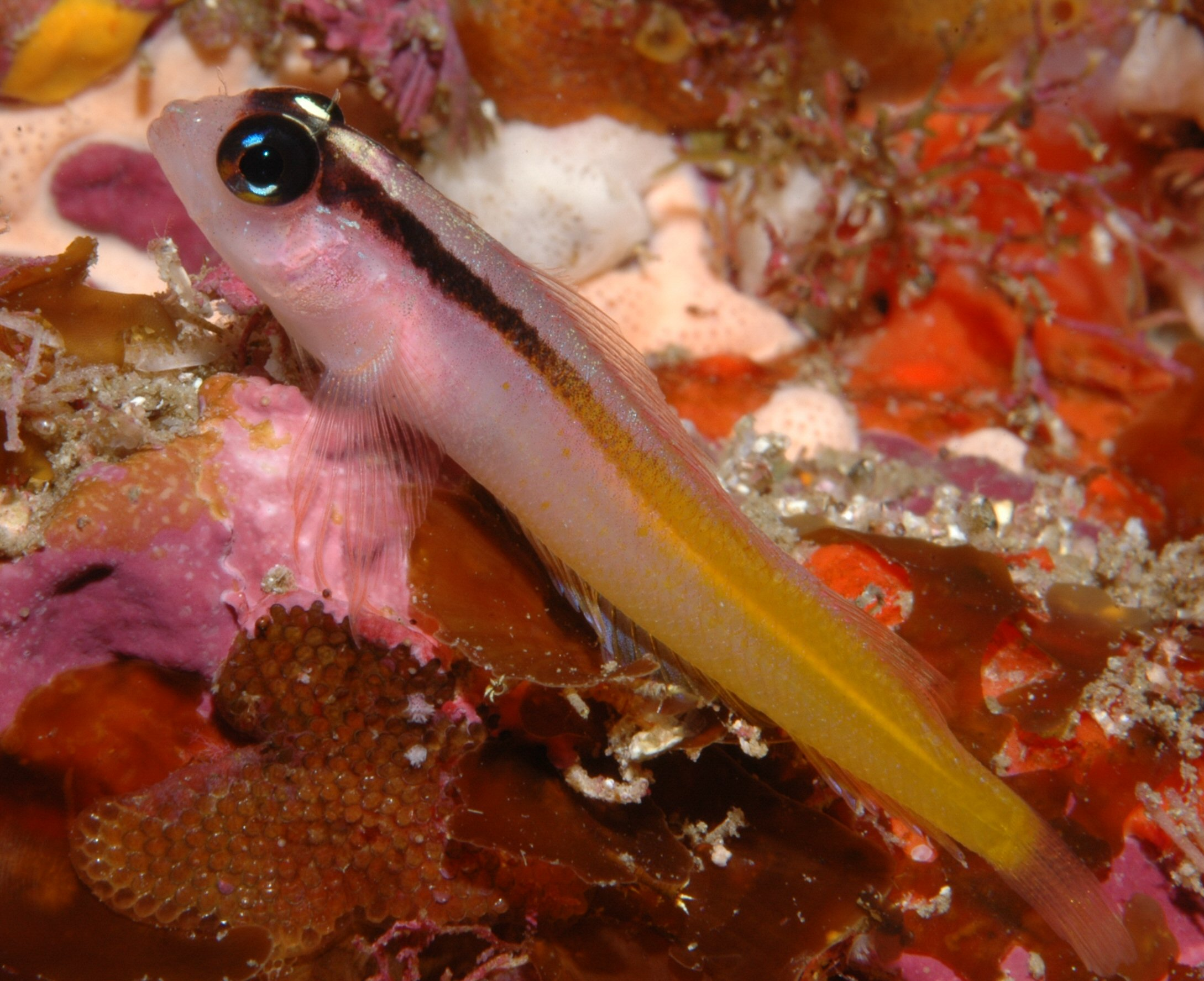
- Yellow-and-black triplefin Forsterygion flavonigrum
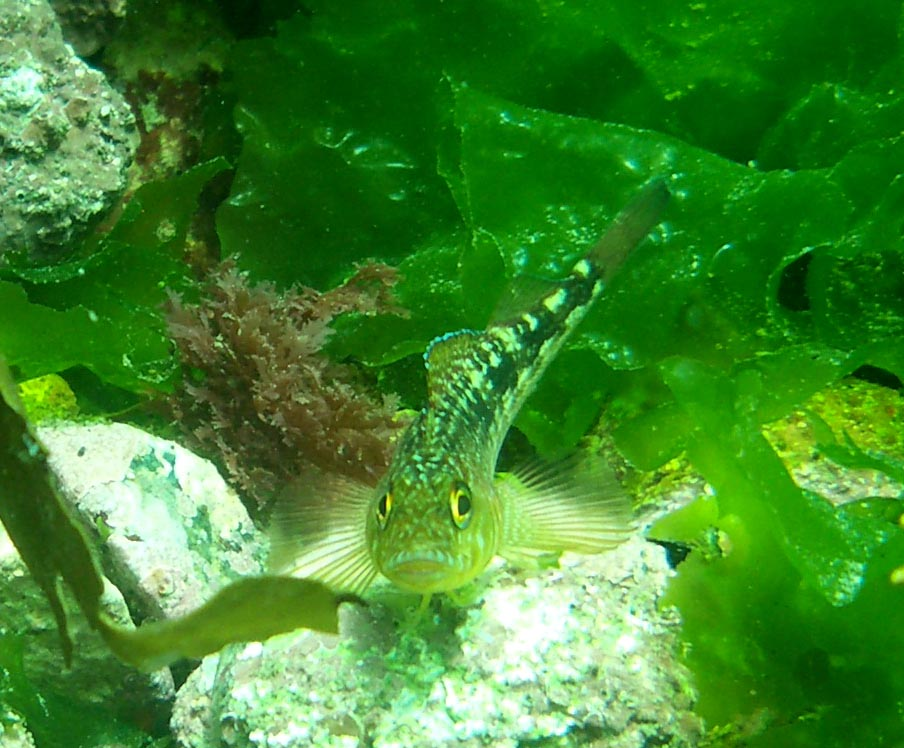
- Striped triplefin Forsterygion varium

Scientific classification
- Kingdom: Animalia
- Phylum: Chordata
- Class: Actinopterygii
- Division: Teleostei
- Order: Blenniiformes
- Family: Tripterygiidae
- Subfamily: Tripterygiinae
- Genus: Forsterygion; Whitley & Phillipps, 1939

Type species
- Blennius varius Forster, 1801

Species
- See text

= Forsterygion =

Genus of fishes

Forsterygion is a genus of triplefins in the family Tripterygiidae native to coastal New Zealand, but also introduced to Tasmania, Australia.

== Species ==
The following species are classified in this genus:

- Spotted robust triplefin, Forsterygion capito (Jenyns, 1842)
- Yellow-and-black triplefin, Forsterygion flavonigrum Fricke & Roberts, 1994
- Tasmanian robust triplefin, Forsterygion gymnotum Scott, 1977
- Common triplefin, Forsterygion lapillum Hardy, 1989
- Mottled triplefin, Forsterygion malcolmi Hardy, 1987
- Oblique-swimming triplefin, Forsterygion maryannae (Hardy, 1987)
- Estuarine triplefin, Forsterygion nigripenne (Valenciennes, 1836)
- Striped triplefin, Forsterygion varium (Forster, 1801)

== Etymology ==
The name of this genus is an amalgam of Forster (in honour of Johann Reinhold Forster (1729–1798), a naturalist aboard Captain Cook’s second voyage on HMS Resolution who collected the type on this voyage, describing it and naming it Blennius varius) – and -ygion, the second part of the genus Tripterygion, into which F. varius and F. nigripenne had been placed.
