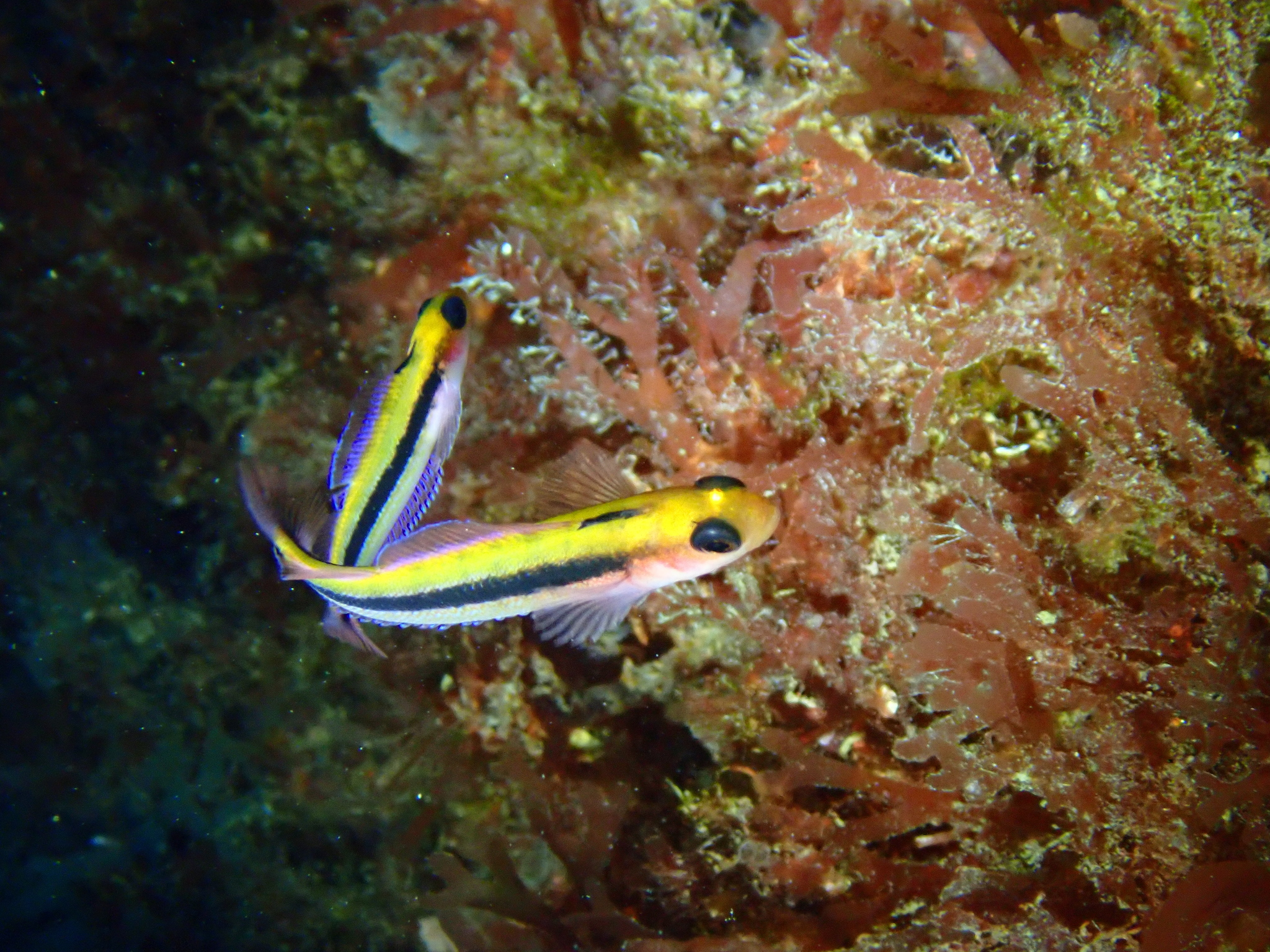

Conservation status
- Least Concern (IUCN 3.1)

Scientific classification
- Kingdom: Animalia
- Phylum: Chordata
- Class: Actinopterygii
- Order: Blenniiformes
- Family: Tripterygiidae
- Genus: Forsterygion
- Species: F. maryannae

Binomial name
- Forsterygion maryannae (Hardy, 1987)

Synonyms
- Obliquichthys maryannae Hardy, 1987

= Oblique-swimming triplefin =

Species of fish

The oblique-swimming triplefin (Forsterygion maryannae) is a triplefin, found along the north east coast of the North Island of New Zealand from depths of about 5 m to 50 m. They are the only triplefins not to spend most of their time resting on the bottom, instead swimming in loose schools of up to hundreds of individuals above rocky reefs. When swimming their head is higher than the tail, giving rise to their common name.

Its length is between 5 and 8 cm. The body is orange-brown with a red tinged head, a black eye, and a wide black lengthwise stripe on each flank. Oblique-swimming triplefins are plankton feeders taking their tiny copepod and euphausid crustacean food in mid-water.

Its specific name honours the underwater photographer Maryann W. Williams.
