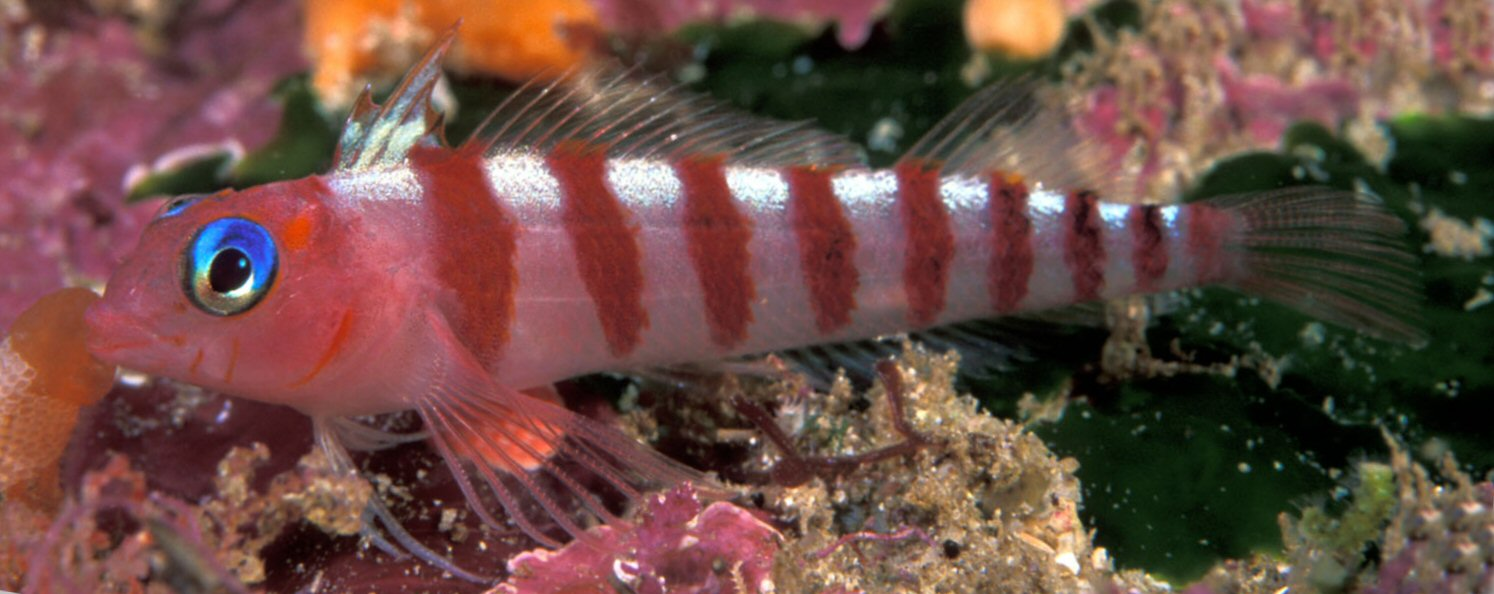
- Blue-eyed triplefin, Notoclinops segmentatus

Scientific classification
- Kingdom: Animalia
- Phylum: Chordata
- Class: Actinopterygii
- Order: Blenniiformes
- Family: Tripterygiidae
- Subfamily: Tripterygiinae
- Genus: Notoclinops; Whitley, 1930

Type species
- Tripterygion segmentatum McCulloch & Phillipps, 1923

Species
- See text.

= Notoclinops =

Genus of fishes

Notoclinops is a genus of triplefins in the family Tripterygiidae from New Zealand.

== Etymology ==
The generic name Notoclinops refers to the superficial resemblance of the species in Notoclinops to the distantly related genus Notoclinus the two sharing a head lacking in scales, a broken lateral line and four spines in first dorsal fin.

== Species ==
Three species are currently recognised within Notoclinops;

- Blue dot triplefin, Notoclinops caerulepunctus Hardy, 1989
- Blue-eyed triplefin, Notoclinops segmentatus (McCulloch & Phillipps, 1923)
- Yaldwyn's triplefin, Notoclinops yaldwyni Hardy, 1987
