= Robert Mackenzie Johnston =

Scottish-Australian statistician and scientist

Robert Mackenzie Johnston F.L.S., (27 November 1843 – 20 April 1918) was a Scottish-Australian statistician and scientist.

== Early life ==
Johnston was born at Petty near Inverness, Scotland, the son of Lachlan Johnstone, a crofter, and his wife Mary, née Mackenzie. Johnston studied botany, geology, and chemistry at the Andersonian University under Professors Kennedy, Crosskey, and Penny.

== Career in Australia ==
In the 1870s he wrote "Field Memoranda for Tasmanian Botanists" (Launceston, 1874). In 1880 he became chief clerk in the Audit Department, his former railway colleagues presented him with a watch inscribed:

Presented to ROBERT MACKENZIE JOHNSTON by personal friends, on the occasion of his going from amongst them, in recognition not merely of his scientific attainments, but also of his social worth, and as a token of the high esteem and great regard in which he has been ever hold. Launceston, Tasmania, August, 1880. Invitum sequitur honos.

He also was the author of "Descriptive Catalogue of Tasmanian Fishes" (Hobart, 1882).

== Legacy ==
Johnston died at Hobart on 20 April 1918 of heart disease. Johnston received the Imperial Service Order in 1903 and was fellow of the Linnean Society of London and the Royal Geographical Society of Australasia and honorary fellow of the Royal Statistical Society of London.

Species named in honor of Robert Mackenzie Johnston include the fish: Johnston's weedfish, Heteroclinus johnstoni, and the Tasmanian yellow gum Eucalyptus johnstonii.
