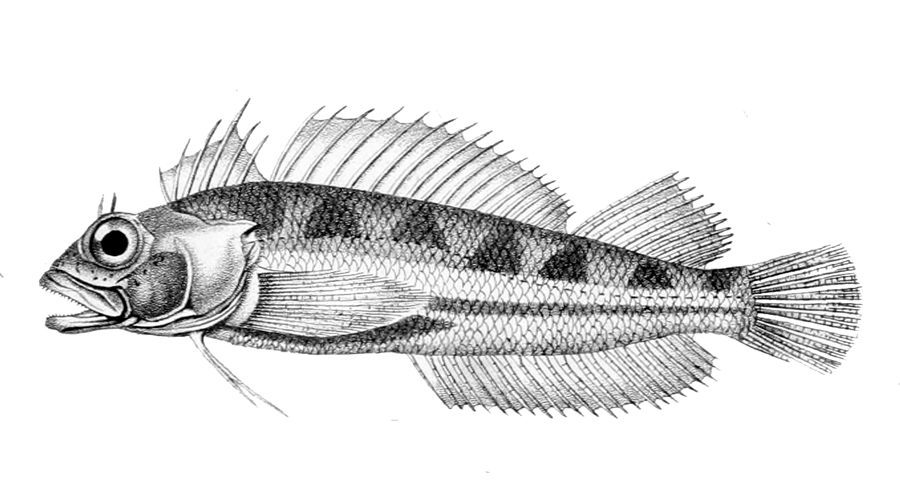

Conservation status
- Least Concern (IUCN 3.1)

Scientific classification
- Kingdom: Animalia
- Phylum: Chordata
- Class: Actinopterygii
- Order: Blenniiformes
- Family: Tripterygiidae
- Genus: Forsterygion
- Species: F. nigripenne

Binomial name
- Forsterygion nigripenne (Valenciennes, 1836)

Synonyms
- Tripterygion nigripenne Valenciennes, 1836; Grahamina nigripenne (Valenciennes, 1836)

= Estuarine triplefin =

Species of fish

The estuarine triplefin or cockabully (Forsterygion nigripenne) is a species of triplefin blenny in the genus Forsterygion. It was described by Achille Valenciennes in 1836. It is found in the Southwest Pacific, throughout New Zealand.

== Description ==
The estuarine triplefin has a long, skinny body with a few scales on the sides of the body. The shape of the head is different in each species and can be round or pointed. The colour and pattern of the body may change according to the environment in which it lives. The length of the body of this fish is roughly 5.5 cm (2.2 in) as an adult, and it usually grows to 8–10 cm (3.1–3.9 in).

The back fins (dorsal fins) are divided into three parts, the first two being made up of hard, spike-like sections (spinous striae) and the third having soft sections (soft striae). The dorsal fin has 24-27 spines and 11-13 soft fin stripes. The spines on the first dorsal fin are particularly long and can be as high as the spines on the second dorsal fin.

The fins on the abdomen (rump fins) have two spines and 24-26 soft striae, while the fins on the pectoral region (pectoral fins) have both branched and unbranched striae. The fins attached under the belly (ventral fins) have small spines and are located near the throat. The tail fins (caudal fins) have ten striae on the upper part and nine on the lower part.

Bony features include 42-44 backbones (vertebrae) in the body and 6-7 supporting striae (gill striae) in the gills. The gill bones (gill covers) are connected to tissue-like membranes. The sensor-like line across the body (lateral line) is broken in the middle, with a row of indented scales at the front and a row of incised scales at the back.

There are small whisker-like projections (tentacles) on the head and no small sensory bulges (sensory papillae) on the sides of the head or around the ears. The scales are basically jagged in shape (comb-like scales), only slightly visible at the front. Scales are absent under the dorsal fin and on the belly. The jaws do not have large canine teeth and may or may not have teeth on the roof of the mouth (palatal teeth). The head is partly made up of four or five small bones (suborbital bones).

== Range ==
This fish is found primarily in tropical and temperate waters, in the Atlantic, Indian, and Pacific oceans. It can be found in coastal waters all around New Zealand.

== Habitat ==
Triple fins live in salty brackish water and live near the bottom of the water. Specifically, they live on rocks, algae, and sand on the seafloor and spread out in shallow water. Depths range from 0 to 3 metres (0 to 10 ft), and they are found in temperate zones, i.e., areas that are relatively warm and have four seasons. Adults are found in the lower reaches of estuaries, rivers, and streams, on rocks and underwater in tree-covered areas. Larvae are planktonic and live mainly in shallow coastal waters. They are primarily found in hard, irregular terrain on the seafloor, particularly in the subtidal zones of rocky and coral reefs. This species does not inhabit freshwater rivers and only moves upstream within the tidal range, making it difficult to capture them by conventional methods in these tidal habitats.

== Ecology ==
=== Life cycle and phenology ===
Eggs develop in a planktonic state, after which the larvae grow in shallow coastal areas. Characteristic morphology appears laterally and dorsally (near the dorsal fins), but the gas bladder (floater) develops later, and dorsal (spinal) rigidity also appears later. During the breeding season, males try to secure and protect their territory and attract as many females as possible. Eggs are usually laid in simple nests built behind large rocks. The male remains in place until the eggs hatch and serves as a guardian of the eggs. The eggs are hemispherical in shape and have many adhesive threads on their surface that anchor them to the algae. The fish is externally fertilised, with the female releasing the eggs as she lays them and the male releasing the sperm nearby. Eggs are laid in an open nest, and the nest itself is not completely covered.

These fish move between the subtidal and intertidal zones as the tides rise and fall, and can be found in depths of at least 12 metres (40 ft). During the breeding season, however, the males lay their eggs under rocks and protect them during the tides. The estuarine triplefin's breeding season lasts for a long period of time during winter and summer and is especially active from May through December.

The average lifespan of this species is approximately 2.9 years, but there is wide variation in lifespan among individuals, with the shortest being 0.2 years (approximately 2 months) and the longest 0.6 years (approximately 7 months).

Unique behaviours are observed during the breeding season. Male Forsterygion nigripenne have enlarged fin tips during this time. Tall columnar cells proliferate on the male's fin epidermis but are absent in females. These cells contain protein granules surrounded by a double membrane. There are three developmental stages, with the most mature cells rupturing to release their contents. While the function is unclear, one study observed secretions being applied to egg masses, possibly for infection prevention.

=== Diet and foraging ===
Forsterygion nigripenne is an omnivorous species. A study investigating the diet of 18 New Zealand triplefin species found that F. nigripenne had the most diverse range of prey items. This species primarily feeds on small benthic invertebrates, including various crustaceans such as amphipods (e.g., gammarids), ostracods, isopods (e.g., sphaeromatids), and brachyuran crab larvae. In addition, it consumes errant polychaetes (free-swimming marine worms) and aquatic insect larvae, particularly from Trichoptera. Fish have been shown to consume an amount of food equivalent to 19.2 times their body weight per year.

=== Predators, parasites and diseases ===
Forsterygion nigripenne was found to be infected with 11 species of larval parasites. This includes six cestodes, three nematodes, and two trematodes.

Studies have observed that triplefins generally do not stray far from their shelter, suggesting that they rely on nearby structures such as rocks and plants to avoid predation.

== Cultural uses ==
There are several important indicators of the ecology of the estuarine triplefin. First, the internal growth rate (rm) shows how fast the fish population grows which is 4.7 times faster than the population growth rate in the wild. Secondly, the recruitment length (lr) is 3.8 cm (1.5 in), and fish begin to participate in breeding when they reach this size.

Estuarine triplefin are also rated as more resilient/productive by FishBase based on their biological characteristics, including precociousness, short life span and relatively high reproductive capacity. This assessment is based on criteria established by the American Fisheries Society (AFS) and derived specifically by the biological parameters applied to the species (e.g. growth coefficient K, age at first maturity tm, maximum life span tmax). In this classification, the ‘decline threshold’ for estuarine triplefin is set at 0.99. This means that if the biomass or mature population of this species declines by more than 99% over 10 years or three generations, it is considered to be at high risk of extinction, unless there is clear, exceptional evidence. However, estuarine triplefin is currently considered ‘highly resilient’ and is unlikely to become extinct unless there are severe environmental changes or strong anthropogenic pressures. This assessment was made specifically for estuarine triplefin and is based on practical life history data and estimates for this species rather than in general statements.
