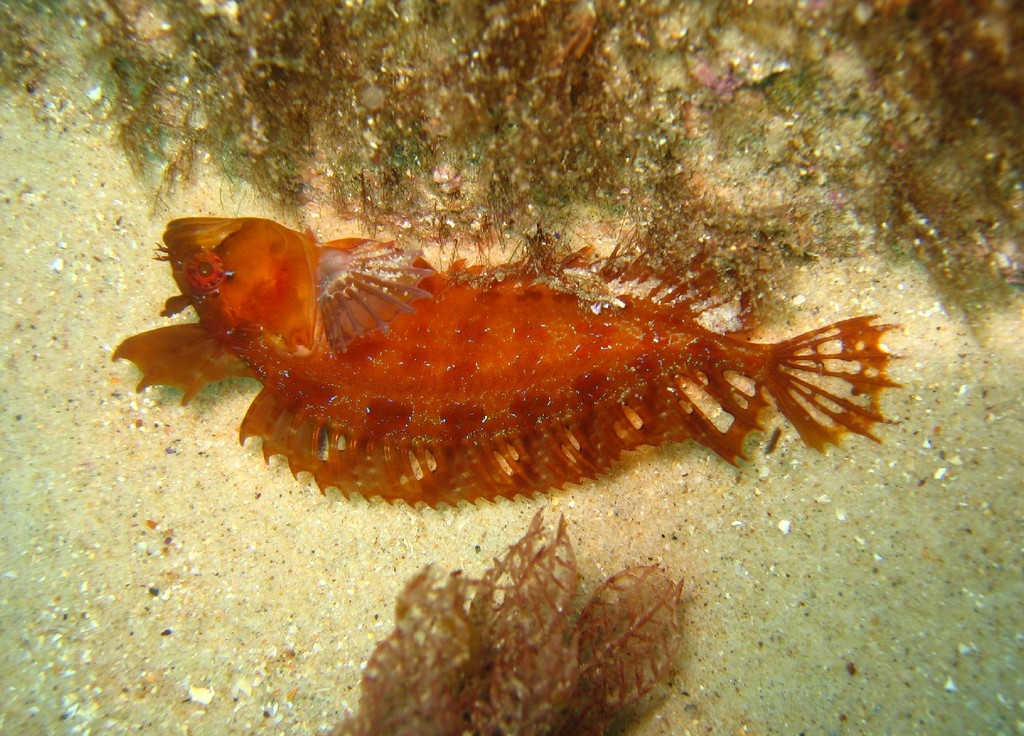

Conservation status
- Least Concern (IUCN 3.1)

Scientific classification
- Kingdom: Animalia
- Phylum: Chordata
- Class: Actinopterygii
- Order: Blenniiformes
- Family: Clinidae
- Genus: Heteroclinus
- Species: H. roseus

Binomial name
- Heteroclinus roseus (Günther, 1861)

Synonyms
- Cristiceps roseus Günther, 1861; Petraites roseus (Günther, 1861); Petraites sellularius Whitley, 1931

= Heteroclinus roseus =

Species of fish

Heteroclinus roseus, the Rosy weedfish, is a species of clinid native to the Pacific Ocean coasts around Japan, Australia and Vanuatu, where it lives in coastal belts of seaweed. This species can reach a maximum length of 15 centimetres (5.9 in) TL. The Rosy Weedfish is known for being able to blend into its seagrass or coral surroundings with its pink or rosy coloration mixed with irregular dark markings.
