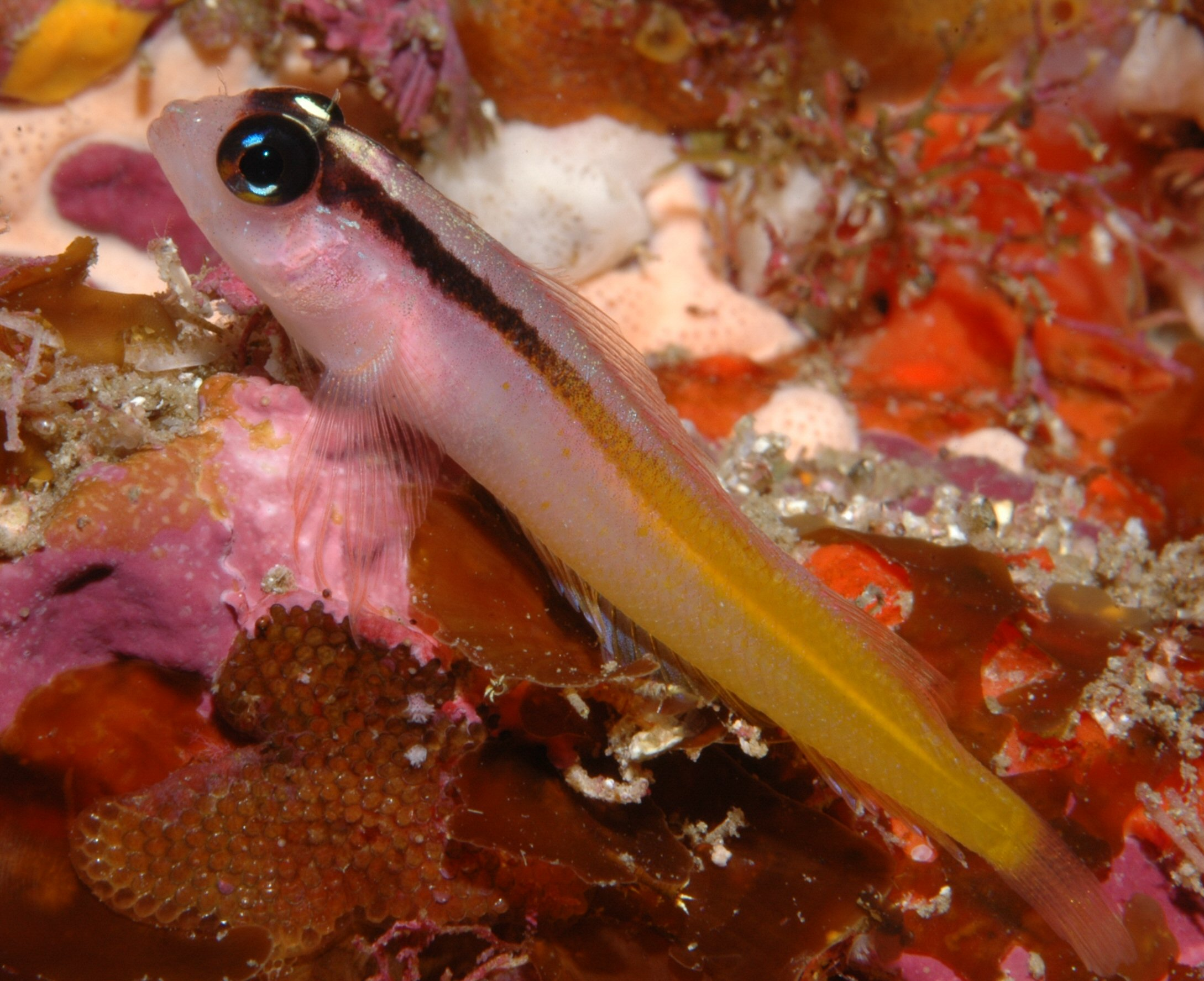

Conservation status
- Least Concern (IUCN 3.1)

Scientific classification
- Kingdom: Animalia
- Phylum: Chordata
- Class: Actinopterygii
- Order: Blenniiformes
- Family: Tripterygiidae
- Genus: Forsterygion
- Species: F. flavonigrum

Binomial name
- Forsterygion flavonigrum Fricke & Roberts, 1994

= Yellow-and-black triplefin =

Species of fish

The yellow-and-black triplefin (Forsterygion flavonigrum) a triplefin of the genus Forsterygion, is found around the north of the North Island of New Zealand at depths of between 15 and 30 m, in reef areas of broken rock. Its length is between 4 and 7 cm.

Its non-breeding colouration is a pale pinkish head with a yellowish body and tail, with a black mask across the eyes which continues in a stripe down the centre of the body gradually changing to a darker yellow.

The breeding colouration is spectacular - the head and tail become black, while the rest of the body becomes bright yellow. Yellow-and-black triplefins guard their nest. After spawning the non-breeding colours rapidly return.
