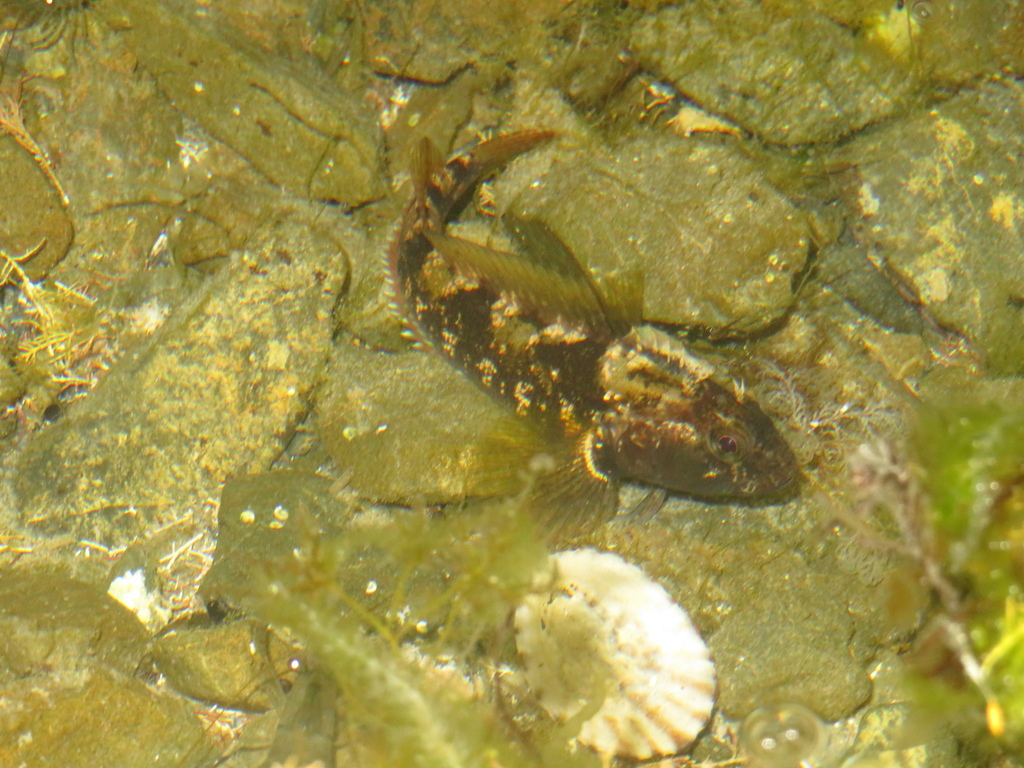

Conservation status
- Least Concern (IUCN 3.1)

Scientific classification
- Kingdom: Animalia
- Phylum: Chordata
- Class: Actinopterygii
- Division: Teleostei
- Order: Blenniiformes
- Family: Tripterygiidae
- Genus: Forsterygion
- Species: F. capito

Binomial name
- Forsterygion capito (Jenyns, 1842)

Synonyms
- Tripterygion capito Jenyns, 1842; Grahamina capito (Jenyns, 1842); Tripterygium jenningsi Hutton, 1879

= Spotted robust triplefin =

Species of fish

Forsterygion capito (genbank common name: spotted robust triplefin) is a species of triplefin blenny in the genus Forsterygion. It was described by Jenyns in 1842.

== Description ==
The spotted robust triplefin has a maximum length of 9.4 cm (3.7 in). The fish generally has a mottled grey and brown coloration that often blends well with its surroundings. Triplefins can also have reddish or yellowish hues that make a good camouflage among rocks and seaweed. The colors of Forsterygion capito make it almost invisible to predators, while some species of triplefins can have bright coloration. The average weight of the triplefin is about 4.4 grams (0.16 oz). Fishes in the family Tripterygiidae have three dorsal fins and scales on each side of their bodies. the first dorsal fin is smaller than the others and the middle dorsal fin has a total of 23 to 28 spines and 13 to 15 soft rays. The anal fin has one to two spines and 24 to 27 soft rays. The pectoral fins are broad for stability and good movement along the substrate. It has a large head compared to a slimmer, long body, and the tail fin is slightly rounded. The snout typically has a concave downward sloping profile, or rarely steep. Most males of the triplefin species during the reproductive season, in autumn, assume a dark spawning coloration.

== Range ==
=== Natural global range ===
The spotted robust triplefin is an endemic species to New Zealand, which means it is not found anywhere else in the world. Worldwide the triplefin fauna includes approximately 30 genera and 130 species. But the greatest diversity and numbers are in the New Zealand region, which has 14 genera and 26 species of triplefin. Remarkably, 12 of these 14 genera are entirely unique to New Zealand. While the species are primarily confined to New Zealand, three of these species were accidentally introduced to Australia, where they now also occur.

=== New Zealand range ===
In New Zealand, Forsterygion capito occurs in temperate marine environments around the North and South Islands, as well as several offshore islands Stewart Island, Auckland Islands, Snares Islands, Antipodes Islands and Chatham Islands. Most fish species in New Zealand coastal waters have either a northern or southern habitat distribution, but unlike those many other fish species, the triplefins show no signs of latitude preferences. This characteristics of the triplefins suggests a high degree of ecological adaptability. The species is endemic in New Zealand and the population is stable. According to the IUCN Redlist it is categorised as least concern, and is not threatened with extinction or population decline. However, this classification is taken based on figures from 2014 and needs updating, because the population status could change as more recent data becomes available in the future.

== Habitat ==
Forsterygion capito is typically found in waters of up to 12 metres (40 ft) depth in the marine neritic, coastal and intertidal zones, like tidepools. They are mostly found in protected waters like harbours or bays. The spotted robust triplefin thrives in both subtidal rocks and rocky reefs, and loose rocks, pebbles and gravel. These habitats provide essential shelter and foraging grounds for the triplefin, as it probably rather use places that are protected from bigger predators. Because they prefer turbid waters, they can be hard to observe. Forsterygion capito is found, and is common in, several of marine protected areas. The fish prefers the water temperatures to be approximately 16 °C (61 °F). It is shown that 10% of Tripterygiidae are kelp dependent or strongly associated with kelp in some part of their life cycle. The diverse species of New Zealand triplefin fishes prefers different habitats. It is shown that habitat preferences is a very important factor in the diversification of the triplefin species. Some species can occupy different patches in the same general location, and some even use different substrate types, like mud and rock. All the species are highly philopatric, which mean that they tend to remain in or return to the area they hatched. They also mate within their own territory.

== Ecology ==
=== Life cycle/phenology ===
Spawning season is said to be both in spring and early summer, and for some species it takes place in winter or early spring. Body size, population density and nest quality are factors that have a large impact on reproductive success. When the female is ready to spawn she moves into the territory of a male. The choice of male shows that females often prefer bigger males with territories offering maximum choice of nesting sites. When she is in the nest, the female lays eggs in batches and lets the male fertilise them by moving aside regularly. The eggs are about 1 to 1.5 mm in diameter. After spawning, the female triplefin plays no role in care, and the male guards the eggs until they hatch. The eggs are hemispherical and are attached to the nesting sites by numerous sticky threads covering them. Hatching happens after about 7–10 days in warm northern waters, and 18 days in cold waters. After that, the hatchlings live planktonic in the water for two to three months, and they are about 0.5 cm long at the time. The juveniles grow fast and reach sexual maturity just before they turn one year old. Settlement happens when the juveniles are about 1.5–2 cm long, which is between August and January. The population of adult triplefins tends to decline in the period when hatchlings grow into juveniles. This is most likely due to the strain caused by a second round of spawning and guarding the nests.

=== Diet and foraging ===
Most triplefins feed on a variety of invertebrates and especially amphipods. Some species, like Forsterygion capito, can eat small benthic organisms, like snails and crabs, as well as polychaete worms, brittle-stars, small hermit crabs and fish eggs. The diet is decided by the habitat of the species, and it will mostly take what it can find in its own territory, rather than any food preference. Forsterygion capito stalks its pray and swallows it whole. Species that live in rock-pools feed mainly on the high and rising tides.

=== Predators, parasites, and diseases ===
Forsterygion capito is listed as LC, least concern as of May 2010. Information on natural predators and threats of the species is not well documented in literature, but because of its size and living environment, it is likely that the species falls prey to many larger marine animals. Those can be larger predatory fish, octopuses and different seabirds. Specified studies confirming the predation on the spotted robust tiplefin are lacking. It has been done research on how plastic pollution of both microplastic ingestion and exposure to plastic has an impact on triplefins. It can affect many stages of the fishes life, and researchers have found that it has a negative impact on growth. The end of the pelagic larval stage, when growing into juveniles and settling into the benthic environment, the predation threat is at its highest. Most triplefins live for two to three years in the northern parts of the New Zealand waters, but in the southern parts they can survive for up to five years.

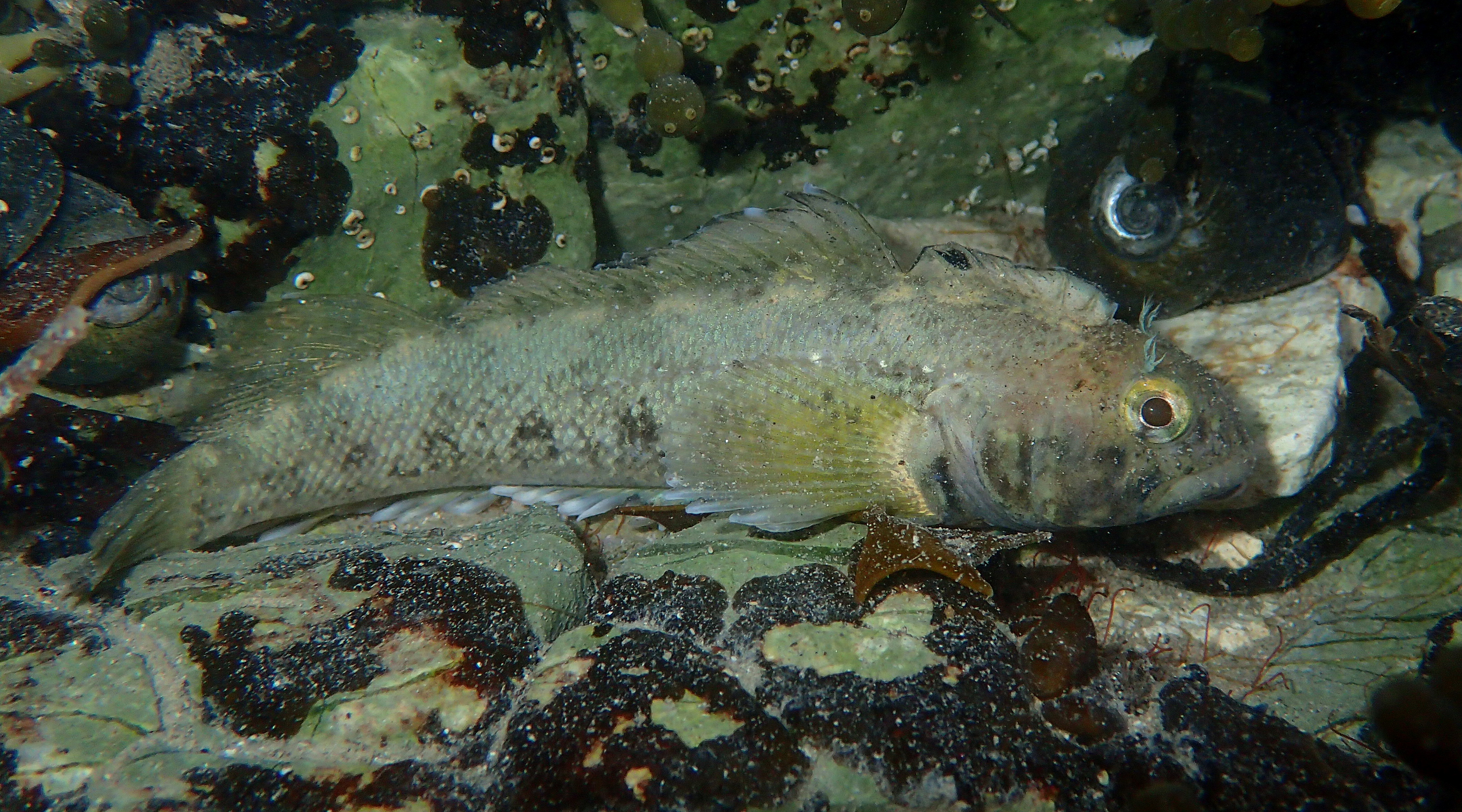
Large Forsterygion capito with muted colouration in rock pool at Kaikōura. Photograph by Austrodyptornithian.

== Other ==
Forsterygion capito is not of any interest in fisheries, meaning it has no significant value for recreational or commercial fishing industries. It is a harmless fish to humans, making it a non-threatening part of the marine fauna in New Zealand.

There are 26 different species of triplefin found in New Zealand. It is the most abundant of the shallow-water subtidal reef fish in New Zealand. Most people refer to them as blennies, even though blennies are a separate group. Blennies are also like triplefins by the lack of a swim bladder as adults, but they differ by the triplefins having three dorsal fins and by blennies lacking scales on their body.
