= Heteroclinus nasutus =

Conservation status
- Least Concern (IUCN 3.1)

Scientific classification
- Kingdom: Animalia
- Phylum: Chordata
- Class: Actinopterygii
- Order: Blenniiformes
- Family: Clinidae
- Genus: Heteroclinus
- Species: H. nasutus

Binomial name
- Heteroclinus nasutus (Günther, 1861)

Synonyms
- Cristiceps nasutus Günther, 1861; Petraites nasutus (Günther, 1861)

Species of fish

Heteroclinus nasutus, the large-nose weedfish, is a species of clinid that is found in the waters of the Pacific Ocean coast of Australia where it prefers algae covered rocky outcrops along the coast down to a depth of about 10 metres (33 ft). This species can reach a maximum length of 9 centimetres (3.5 in) TL.
