= Heteroclinus eckloniae =

Conservation status
- Least Concern (IUCN 3.1)

Scientific classification
- Kingdom: Animalia
- Phylum: Chordata
- Class: Actinopterygii
- Order: Blenniiformes
- Family: Clinidae
- Genus: Heteroclinus
- Species: H. eckloniae

Binomial name
- Heteroclinus eckloniae (McKay, 1970)

Synonyms
- Clinus eckloniae McKay, 1970

Species of fish

Heteroclinus eckloniae, the Kelp weedfish, is a species of clinid native to the Indo-Pacific waters of the western and southern coasts of Australia where it can be found in kelp and algal reefs. This species can reach a maximum length of 11 centimetres (4.3 in) TL.
