= Heteroclinus antinectes =

Conservation status
- Least Concern (IUCN 3.1)

Scientific classification
- Kingdom: Animalia
- Phylum: Chordata
- Class: Actinopterygii
- Order: Blenniiformes
- Family: Clinidae
- Genus: Heteroclinus
- Species: H. antinectes

Binomial name
- Heteroclinus antinectes (Günther, 1861)

Synonyms
- Cristiceps antinectes Günther, 1861

Species of fish

Heteroclinus antinectes, the Natal weedfish, is a species of clinid found in the Indian Ocean waters off of Australia. It is endemic to Shark Bay in Western Australia.
