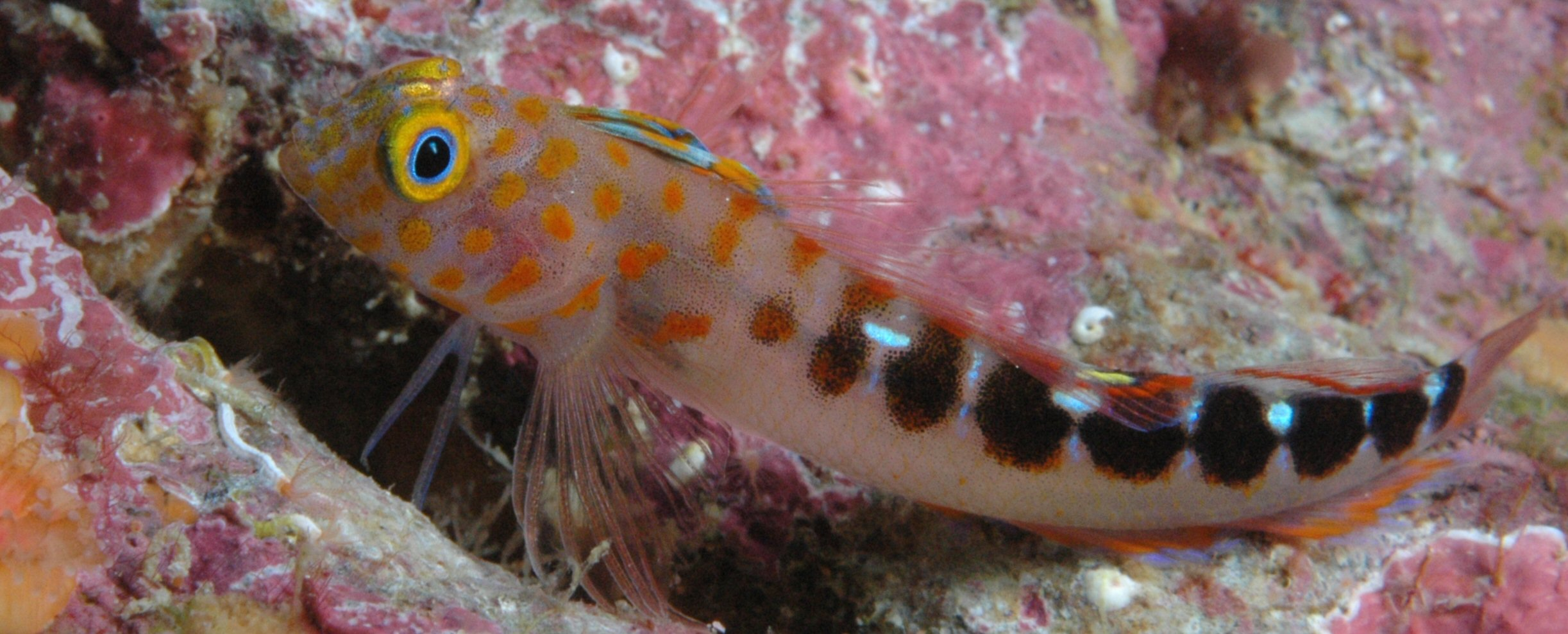

Conservation status
- Least Concern (IUCN 3.1)

Scientific classification
- Kingdom: Animalia
- Phylum: Chordata
- Class: Actinopterygii
- Order: Blenniiformes
- Family: Tripterygiidae
- Genus: Notoclinops
- Species: N. caerulepunctus

Binomial name
- Notoclinops caerulepunctus Hardy, 1989

= Blue dot triplefin =

Species of fish found near New Zealand

The blue dot triplefin (Notoclinops caerulepunctus) is a fish in the genus Notoclinops, found around offshore islands and exposed headlands of the eastern side of Northland, and the Bay of Plenty, on the North Island of New Zealand from depths of a metre or so to about 30 m, and is most commonly found in reef areas with broken rock. with a length of only up to about 5 cm and it is the smallest of the triplefins in New Zealand.

The blue dot triplefin's head is yellow-orange covered with large bright red spots back as far as the first dorsal fin. On the upper half of the rest of the body are a series of dark blue-black square areas, with an iridescent blue spot joining each pair of squares. These dots are often the only thing seen when the fish is resting on rocks covered in colourful encrusting life. It is known to remove parasites from large fishes.
