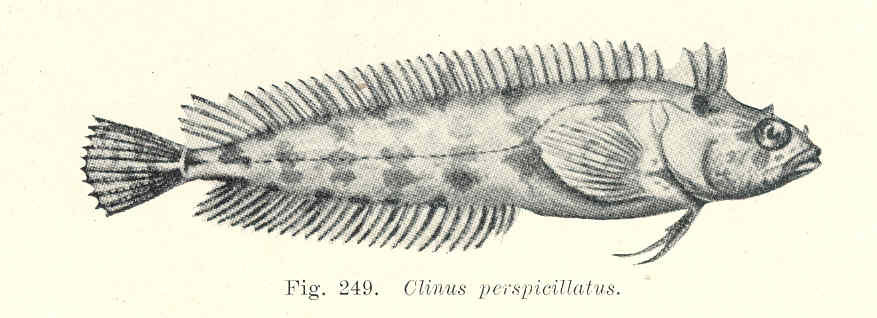

Conservation status
- Least Concern (IUCN 3.1)

Scientific classification
- Kingdom: Animalia
- Phylum: Chordata
- Class: Actinopterygii
- Order: Blenniiformes
- Family: Clinidae
- Genus: Heteroclinus
- Species: H. perspicillatus

Binomial name
- Heteroclinus perspicillatus (Valenciennes, 1836)

Synonyms
- Clinus perspicillatus Valenciennes, 1836; Clinus despicillatus J. Richardson, 1839; Cristiceps robustus Günther, 1867; Neoblennius fasciatus Castelnau, 1875

= Heteroclinus perspicillatus =

Species of fish

Heteroclinus perspicillatus, the common weedfish, is a species of clinid native to southern Australia where it is found in seagrass beds and rocky reefs (especially with kelp cover) at depths of up to 10 metres (33 ft) . This species can reach a maximum length of 20 centimetres (7.9 in) TL.

The common weedfish is ovoviviparous, meaning young develop inside eggs and hatch within the female, before the well-developed larvae are born alive.
