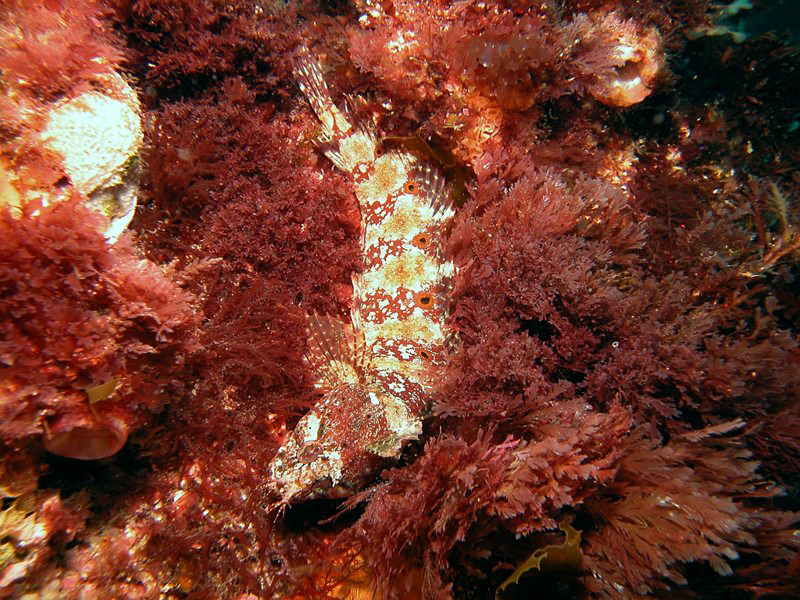

Conservation status
- Least Concern (IUCN 3.1)

Scientific classification
- Kingdom: Animalia
- Phylum: Chordata
- Class: Actinopterygii
- Order: Blenniiformes
- Family: Clinidae
- Genus: Heteroclinus
- Species: H. johnstoni

Binomial name
- Heteroclinus johnstoni (Saville-Kent, 1886)

Synonyms
- Clinus johnstoni Saville-Kent, 1886

= Heteroclinus johnstoni =

Species of fish

Heteroclinus johnstoni, or Johnston's weedfish, is a species of clinid native to the waters along the around southern Australian coast where it prefers reefs with tall seaweed growth at depths down to about 50 metres (160 ft). This species can reach a maximum length of 40 centimetres (16 in) TL. The specific name honours the statistician and scientist Robert Mackenzie Johnston (1843-1918).
