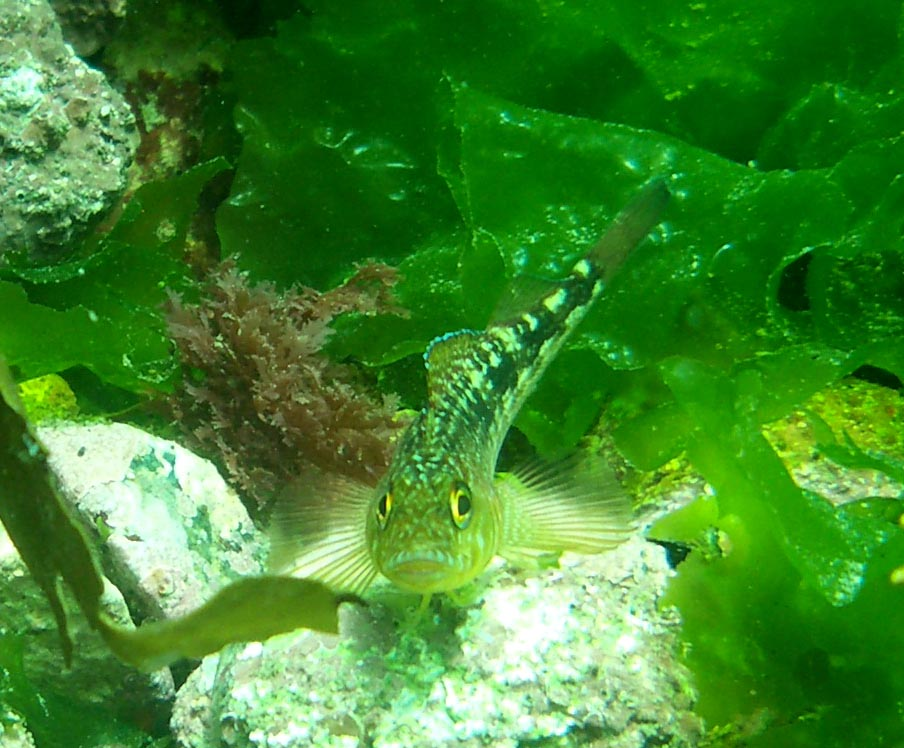

Conservation status
- Least Concern (IUCN 3.1)

Scientific classification
- Kingdom: Animalia
- Phylum: Chordata
- Class: Actinopterygii
- Order: Blenniiformes
- Family: Tripterygiidae
- Genus: Forsterygion
- Species: F. varium

Binomial name
- Forsterygion varium (Forster, 1801)

Synonyms
- Blennius varius Forster, 1801; Tripterygion varium (Forster, 1801); Tripterygion robustum Clarke, 1879; Forsterygion multiradiatum Scott, 1977

= Variable triplefin =

Species of fish

The variable triplefin or striped triplefin (Forsterygion varium) is a triplefin native to New Zealand, but also introduced to Tasmania, Australia, most likely in shipments of oysters. It is found in rock pools and depths down to 30 metres, in reef areas of broken rock with kelp.
