= Heteroclinus equiradiatus =

Conservation status
- Least Concern (IUCN 3.1)

Scientific classification
- Kingdom: Animalia
- Phylum: Chordata
- Class: Actinopterygii
- Order: Blenniiformes
- Family: Clinidae
- Genus: Heteroclinus
- Species: H. equiradiatus

Binomial name
- Heteroclinus equiradiatus (Milward, 1960)

Synonyms
- Petraites equiradiatus Milward, 1960

Species of fish

Heteroclinus equiradiatus, the Sevenbar weedfish, is a species of clinid native to the Indian Ocean coast of western Australia. This species can reach a maximum length of 9.7 centimetres (3.8 in) TL.
