= Heteroclinus puellarum =

Conservation status
- Least Concern (IUCN 3.1)

Scientific classification
- Kingdom: Animalia
- Phylum: Chordata
- Class: Actinopterygii
- Order: Blenniiformes
- Family: Clinidae
- Genus: Heteroclinus
- Species: H. puellarum

Binomial name
- Heteroclinus puellarum (E. O. G. Scott, 1955)

Synonyms
- Clinus puellarum E. O. G. Scott, 1955

Species of fish

Heteroclinus puellarum, the little weedfish, is a species of clinid found on the Indian Ocean coast of southeastern Australia where it can be found in tide pools, rocky reefs and estuaries. This species can reach a maximum length of 10 centimetres (3.9 in) TL.
