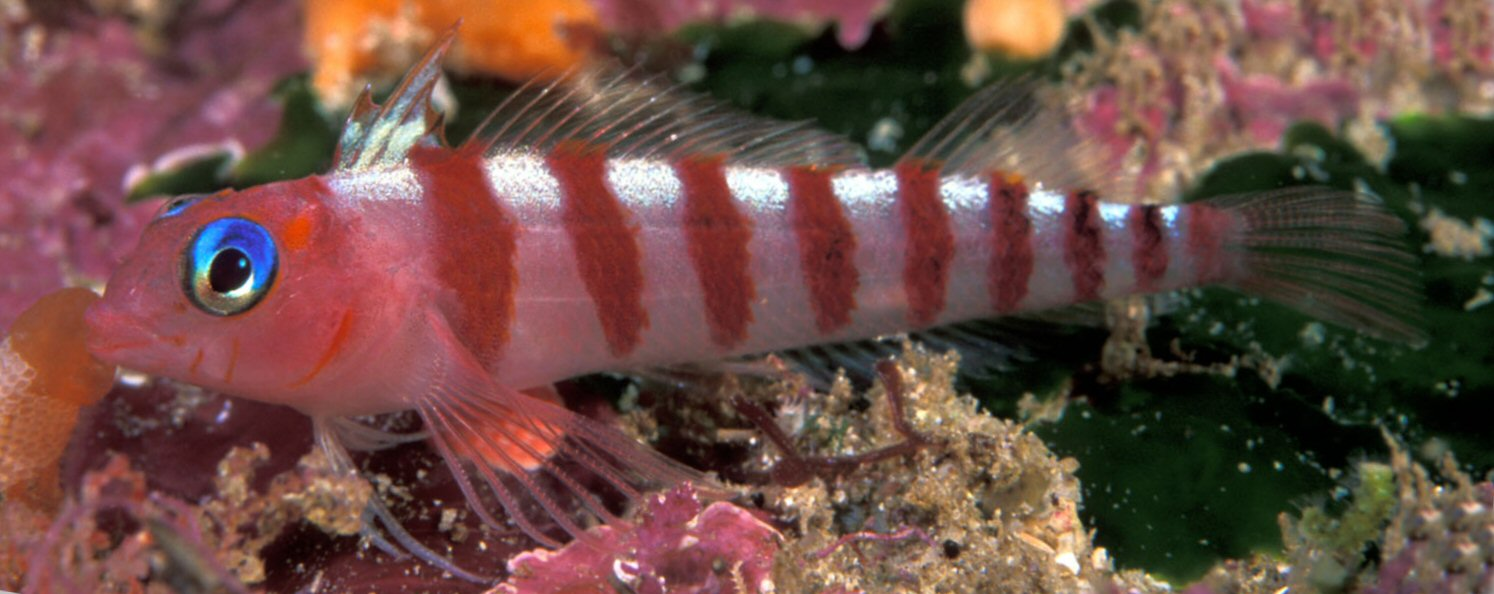

Conservation status
- Least Concern (IUCN 3.1)

Scientific classification
- Kingdom: Animalia
- Phylum: Chordata
- Class: Actinopterygii
- Order: Blenniiformes
- Family: Tripterygiidae
- Genus: Notoclinops
- Species: N. segmentatus

Binomial name
- Notoclinops segmentatus (McCulloch & Phillipps, 1923)

Synonyms
- Tripterygion segmentatum McCulloch & Phillipps, 1923; Tripterygion bucknilli Griffin, 1926; Notoclinops bucknilli (Griffin, 1926); Enneapterygius mortenseni Rendahl, 1926

= Blue-eyed triplefin =

Species of fish

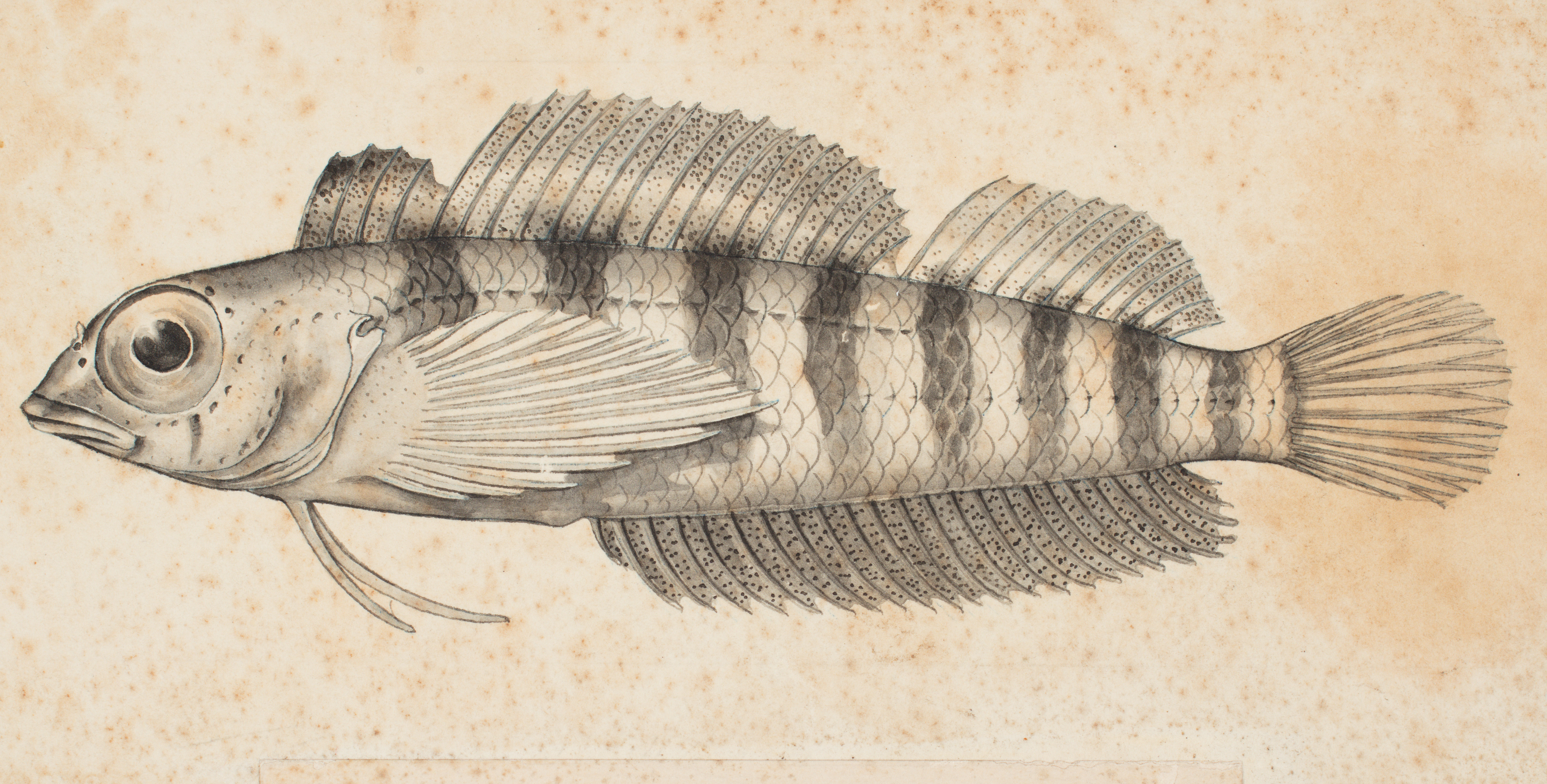
1920s illustration of the blue-eyed triplefin by Louis Thomas Griffin

The blue-eyed triplefin (Notoclinops segmentatus) is a fish in the genus Notoclinops, commonly found around the North Island of New Zealand from depths of a metre to about 30 m, most common in reef areas of broken rock. Its length is between 3 and 6 cm and it is easily distinguished from other small fish by its iridescent blue eyes which give its name. There are nine red vertical bars running right round the body, and an orange tinge to the back and head.

In the breeding season in winter the orange on the males becomes brighter on the head, tail, and anal fin. The rest of the body becomes blue/black. Males set up nests in small depressions on vertical rock faces at depths of about 10 to 20 m where females are encouraged to lay their eggs. The nest is then guarded.

The blue-eyed triplefin's diet includes small crustaceans (including amphipods and copepods), and has been known to remove parasites from larger fish. This fish count (at 2017) is 58.
