= Heteroclinus heptaeolus =

Conservation status
- Least Concern (IUCN 3.1)

Scientific classification
- Kingdom: Animalia
- Phylum: Chordata
- Class: Actinopterygii
- Order: Blenniiformes
- Family: Clinidae
- Genus: Heteroclinus
- Species: H. heptaeolus

Binomial name
- Heteroclinus heptaeolus (J. D. Ogilby, 1885)

Synonyms
- Petraites heptaeolus J. D. Ogilby, 1885

Species of fish

Heteroclinus heptaeolus, or Ogilby's weedfish, is a species of clinid native to the coast of southern Australia where it can be found in habitats with plentiful seaweed growth. This species can reach a maximum length of 10 centimetres (3.9 in) TL.
