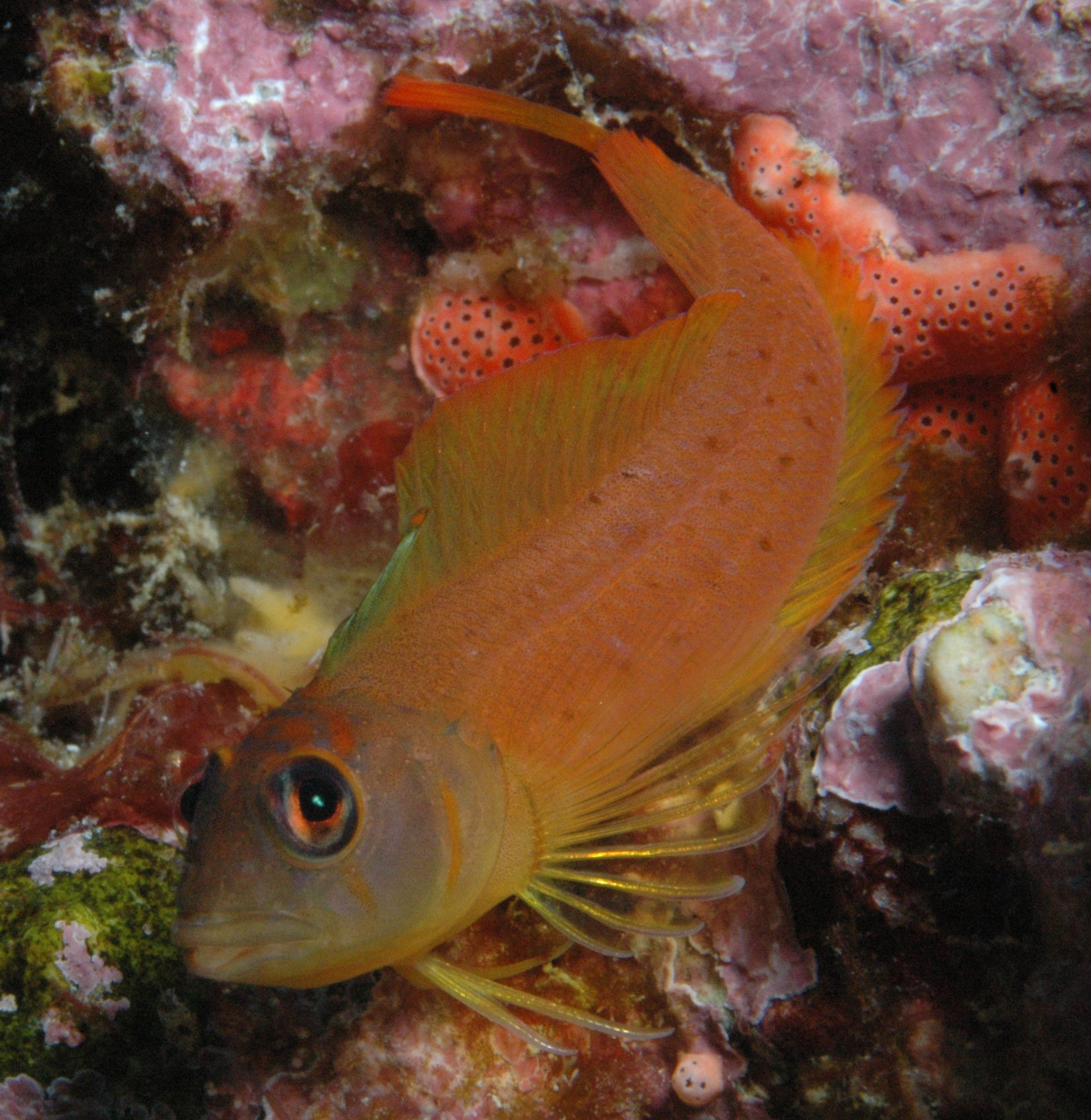

Conservation status
- Least Concern (IUCN 3.1)

Scientific classification
- Kingdom: Animalia
- Phylum: Chordata
- Class: Actinopterygii
- Order: Blenniiformes
- Family: Tripterygiidae
- Genus: Notoclinops
- Species: N. yaldwyni

Binomial name
- Notoclinops yaldwyni Hardy, 1987

= Yaldwyn's triplefin =

Species of fish

Yaldwyn's triplefin (Notoclinops yaldwyni) is a fish of the genus Notoclinops, found around the North Island of New Zealand from low water to depths of about 5 metres, most common in reef areas of broken rock, but nowhere common. Its length is between 4 and 8 centimetres. It is a pale yellow-brown with a faint orange tinge to the head, and two or three rows of small black dots on the flanks.

The male's breeding colours are dark orange on the head and forepart of the body, and yellow on the rest.

Its common name and its specific name both honour the marine biologist John C. Yaldwyn (1929-2005) who was the Director of the National Museum of New Zealand and whose name had been associated with this blenny since 1972.
