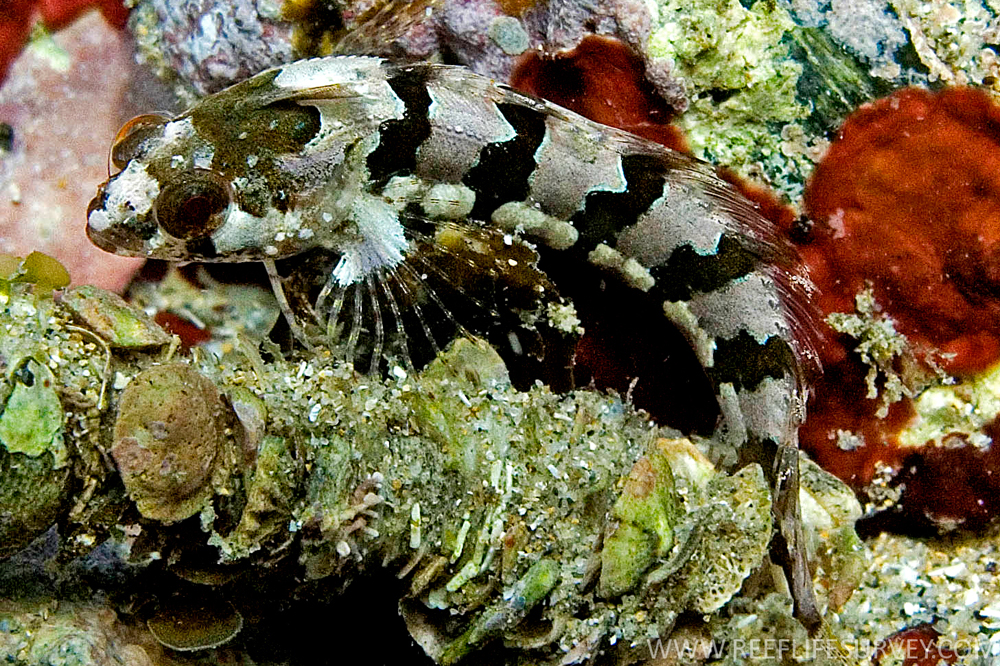

Conservation status
- Least Concern (IUCN 3.1)

Scientific classification
- Kingdom: Animalia
- Phylum: Chordata
- Class: Actinopterygii
- Order: Blenniiformes
- Family: Clinidae
- Genus: Heteroclinus
- Species: H. whiteleggii

Binomial name
- Heteroclinus whiteleggii (J. D. Ogilby, 1894)

Synonyms
- Clinus whiteleggii J. D. Ogilby, 1894; Heteroclinus whiteleggi (J. D. Ogilby, 1894); Cristiceps fasciatus W.J. Macleay, 1881; Heteroclinus fasciatus (W.J. Macleay, 1881)

= Heteroclinus whiteleggii =

Species of fish

Heteroclinus whiteleggii, Whitelegg's weedfish, is a species of clinid native to reefs around New South Wales, Australia. This species can reach a maximum length of 10 centimetres (3.9 in) TL. The specific name honours the naturalist Thomas Whitelegge (1850–1927) who was a friend of Ogilby's friend and who collected the type.
