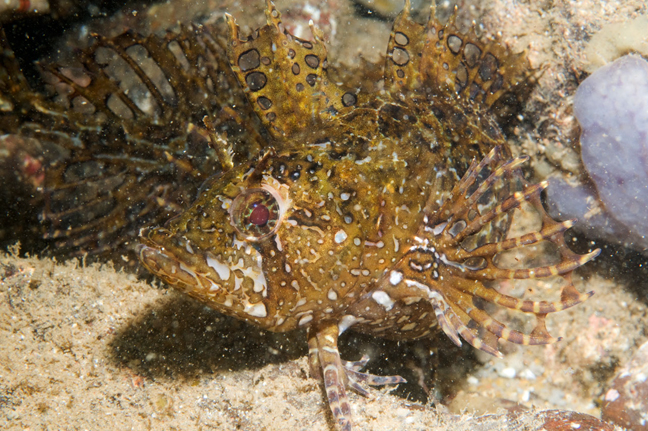

Conservation status
- Least Concern (IUCN 3.1)

Scientific classification
- Kingdom: Animalia
- Phylum: Chordata
- Class: Actinopterygii
- Order: Blenniiformes
- Family: Clinidae
- Genus: Heteroclinus
- Species: H. tristis

Binomial name
- Heteroclinus tristis (Klunzinger, 1872)

Synonyms
- Cristiceps tristis Klunzinger, 1872

= Heteroclinus tristis =

Species of fish

Heteroclinus tristis, the sharp-nose weedfish, is a species of clinid native to the coastal waters of southern Australia where it prefers sandy reefs with sparse vegetation. This species can reach a maximum length of 30 centimetres (12 in) TL. This species feed primarily fishes, shrimp and prawns.
