= Heteroclinus wilsoni =

Conservation status
- Least Concern (IUCN 3.1)

Scientific classification
- Kingdom: Animalia
- Phylum: Chordata
- Class: Actinopterygii
- Order: Blenniiformes
- Family: Clinidae
- Genus: Heteroclinus
- Species: H. wilsoni

Binomial name
- Heteroclinus wilsoni (A. H. S. Lucas, 1891)

Synonyms
- Cristiceps wilsoni A. H. S. Lucas, 1891

Species of fish

Heteroclinus wilsoni, or Wilson's weedfish, is a species of clinid found along the coast of southern Australia and Tasmania where it can be found in weedy reefs from the intertidal zone down to a depth of about 20 metres (66 ft). This species can reach a maximum length of 14 centimetres (5.5 in) TL. The specific name honours John Bracebridge Wilson (1828-1895), a naturalist and headmaster who collected the type.
