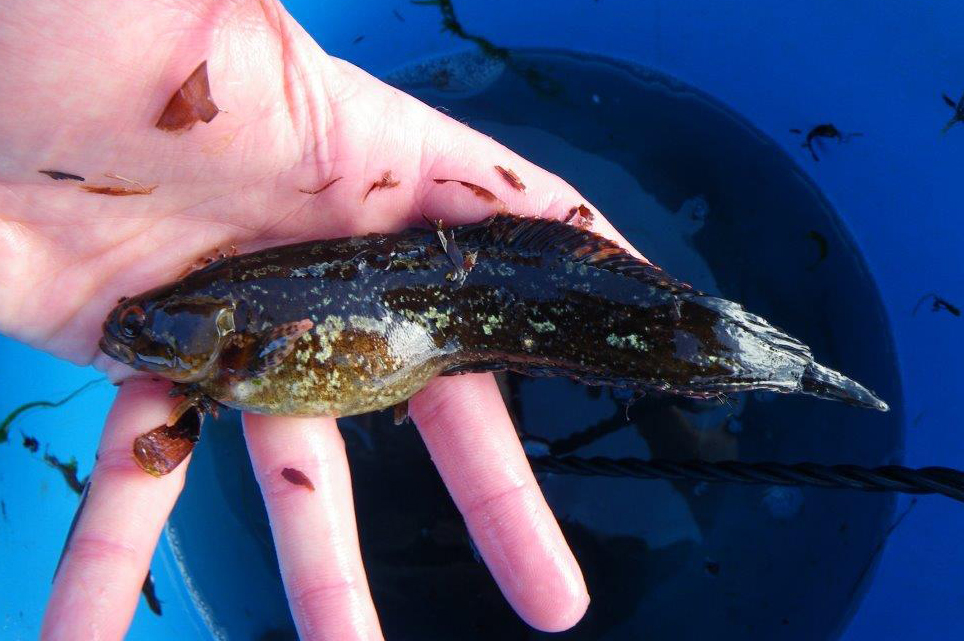

Conservation status
- Least Concern (IUCN 3.1)

Scientific classification
- Kingdom: Animalia
- Phylum: Chordata
- Class: Actinopterygii
- Order: Blenniiformes
- Family: Clinidae
- Genus: Cologrammus
- Species: C. flavescens

Binomial name
- Cologrammus flavescens (F. W. Hutton, 1872)

Synonyms
- Sticharium flavescens F. W. Hutton, 1872; Heteroclinus flavescens (F. W. Hutton, 1872); Heteroclinus marmoratus (Klunzinger, 1872); Clinus marmoratus Klunzinger, 1872

= Short-tassel weedfish =

Species of fish

The short-tassel weedfish (Cologrammus flavescens) is a species of clinid native to the Pacific Ocean waters around the Bass Strait and New Zealand. This species are known to feed on fishes and benthic crustaceans. It is the only species in its genus. Klunzinger's name, Clinus marmoratus, is a homonym and was preoccupied by Castelnau's Clinus marmoratus, rendering it invalid for this fish and this name is now considered to be a junior synonym of Cologrammus flavescens.
