= Heteroclinus adelaidae =

Conservation status
- Least Concern (IUCN 3.1)

Scientific classification
- Kingdom: Animalia
- Phylum: Chordata
- Class: Actinopterygii
- Order: Blenniiformes
- Family: Clinidae
- Genus: Heteroclinus
- Species: H. adelaidae

Binomial name
- Heteroclinus adelaidae Castelnau, 1872

Synonyms
- Cristiceps phillipi A. H. S. Lucas, 1891

Species of fish

Heteroclinus adelaidae, the Adelaide's weedfish, is a species of clinid that occurs in the Indo-Pacific waters around southern Australia. It prefers weedy habitats like seagrass beds, weedy reefs, and silty areas down to a depth of about 15 metres (49 ft) where it feeds on benthic animals. This species can reach a maximum length of 9 centimetres (3.5 in) TL.
