= Heteroclinus macrophthalmus =

Conservation status
- Least Concern (IUCN 3.1)

Scientific classification
- Kingdom: Animalia
- Phylum: Chordata
- Class: Actinopterygii
- Order: Blenniiformes
- Family: Clinidae
- Genus: Heteroclinus
- Species: H. macrophthalmus

Binomial name
- Heteroclinus macrophthalmus Hoese, 1976

Species of fish

Heteroclinus macrophthalmus, the large-eye weedfish, is a species of clinid native to Indian Ocean waters around southern Australia where it prefers beds of sea-grass and algal reefs down to a depth of about 18 metres (59 ft). This species can reach a maximum length of 10 centimetres (3.9 in) TL.
