= Kelpfish =

Kelpfish may refer to:

- Chironemus, the only genus in the family Chironemidae, commonly referred to as kelpfishes
  - Large kelpfish (Chironemus marmoratus), commonly known as the kelpfish
- Gibbonsia, a genus of blennies from the family Clinidae, its members having the common name kelpfish
  - Gibbonsia elegans, the spotted kelpfish
  - Gibbonsia metzi, the striped kelpfish
  - Gibbonsia montereyensis, the crevice kelpfish
- Giant kelpfish (Heterostichus rostratus), a species of blenny in the family Clinidae
- Sebastiscus marmoratus, the false kelpfish, a species of rockfish from the family Scorpaenidae
- Oxyjulis californica, the señorita, a species of wrasse sometimes referred to as a type of kelpfish
