= Jon Fisher =

Entrepreneur

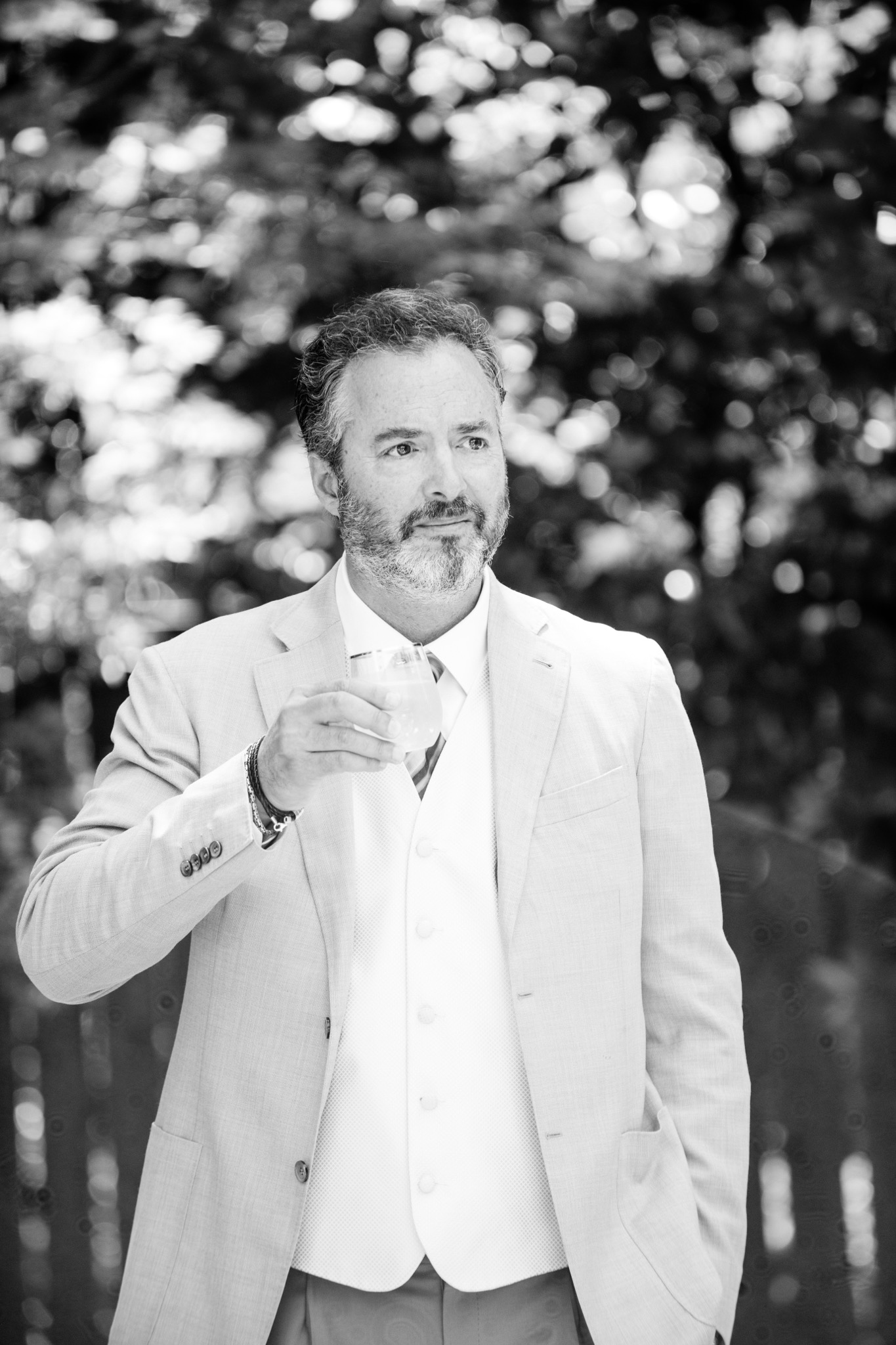
- Fisher at Lowenstein Bat Mitzvah June 2024
- Born: January 19, 1972 (age 54); Stanford, California
- Education: Vassar College, University of San Francisco
- Occupations: Entrepreneur, speaker
- Spouse: Darla Kincheloe Fisher
- Children: Avery Emerson Fisher

Jon Fisher is a Silicon Valley entrepreneur. As of 2021, Fisher is the CEO and a co-founder of software company Vici Network (formerly ViciNFT). As a co-founding CEO, Fisher built multiple companies including Bharosa—which produced the Oracle Adaptive Access Manager and sold to Oracle Corporation for a reported $50 million in 2007, NetClerk—now part of Roper Technologies, AutoReach—now part of AutoNation, and CrowdOptic.

== Early life and education ==
Fisher was born in Stanford, California to university professors Gerald and Anita Fisher. His father is a nuclear physicist at Stanford. Fisher graduated from The Nueva School and Crystal Springs Uplands School, and attended Vassar College before graduating from the University of San Francisco.

== Career ==
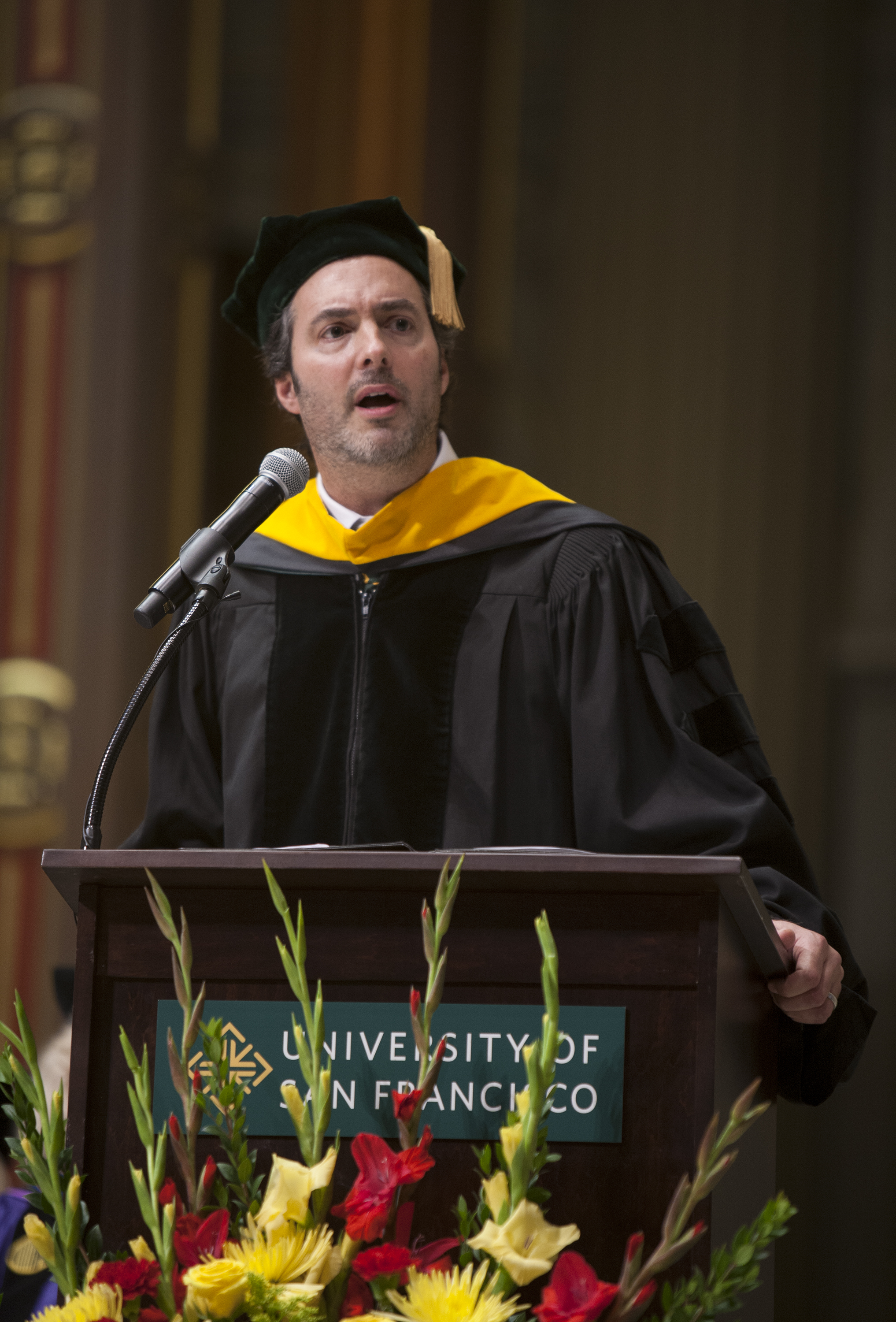
Jon Fisher speaks at University of San Francisco commencement, 2018

In 1994, Fisher cofounded and was chief executive officer of AutoReach, now an AutoNation company. Former Oracle President and recent Hewlett Packard chairman Ray Lane was Fisher's first angel investor and also invested in two of Fisher's later start ups. In 1998, Fisher was the co-founder and CEO of the business software company, NetClerk, Inc., now part of Roper Technologies. The company created the online construction permit. In 2004, Fisher cofounded and was chief executive officer of Bharosa, which was acquired by Oracle Corporation in 2007.

=== Academic career ===
Fisher is an adjunct professor at the University of San Francisco. Fisher has written a book, Strategic Entrepreneurism: Shattering the Start-Up Entrepreneurial Myths, which was published in 2008 by SelectBooks.

Fisher's second book, I Took the Only Path to See You, was published in 2021 by Wiley Publishers. The publisher also issued a non-fungible token (NFT) to promote the book.

=== Recognition ===
In 2006, Fisher was recognized by American City Business Journals on their list of Forty Under 40 people to watch.

In 2007, Fisher was recognized by Ernst & Young as Entrepreneur Of The Year, Emerging Category.

== Personal life ==
Fisher is married to Darla Kincheloe Fisher and has a daughter.

Fisher has been a trustee of the Nueva School in Hillsborough, CA and was a member of their 2008 capital campaign team. He has also been a trustee of the Pacific Vascular Research Foundation in South San Francisco and he has been on the board of the Buck Institute For Age Research. Fisher was a major fundraiser for the Joe Biden 2020 presidential campaign. As of 2024, Fisher is the chairman of Bay Ecotarium including San Francisco Aquarium of the Bay.
