= Crevice =

A crevice is a fracture or fissure in rock.

Crevice may also refer to:

- Crevice corrosion, occurs in spaces to which the access of corrosion-resistant fluid is limited
- Crevice kelpfish (Gibbonsia montereyensis), a species of subtropical clinid
- Crevice Spiny Lizard (Sceloporus poinsettii), a small, typically shy, phrynosomatid lizard
- Crevice weaver (family Filistatidae), a haplogyne spider that weaves funnel or tube webs

== See also ==
- Crevasse, a deep crack or fissure in an ice sheet or glacier
- Operation Crevice, a 2004 police raid in the United Kingdom
