= Harold Gilliam =

American writer and environmentalist

Harold Gilliam (né Harold Thompson Gilliam; 8 August 1918 Los Angeles – 14 December 2016 San Francisco) was a San Francisco–based writer, newspaperman and environmentalist, a columnist for the San Francisco Chronicle and Examiner newspapers. The Harold Gilliam Award for Excellence in Environmental Reporting, given by The Bay Institute, is named in his honor.

== Early life and education ==
Gilliam was born in Los Angeles and earned a bachelor's degree in political science from UCLA and a master's in economics from UC Berkeley; he later studied under Wallace Stegner at the Stanford Writing Program. He served in the 11th Armored Division in Europe in World War II.

== Career ==
Gilliam began his career in journalism as a copy boy at the Chronicle, where he was soon made a reporter. In 1954 he became a freelancer, then in 1960 began an environmental column at the Examiner; the following year he returned to the Chronicle, where he continued his column, called "This Land", until retiring in 1995.

San Francisco Bay, his first book, was on The New York Times bestseller list for 19 weeks. It led to his being invited to be a founder member of Save the Bay.

Gilliam was one of the first environmentalist journalists, and helped mobilize public opinion to save many features of the San Francisco Bay Area. In the 1960s, through an article and personal contacts, he helped achieve a Marin County ordinance forestalling the bulldozing of archaeological sites. His article "The Destruction of Mono Lake Is on Schedule", which appeared in the Examiner in March 1979, was one of the first public accounts of the then ongoing destruction of Mono Lake; in 1993 he was the first recipient of the Defender of the Trust award from the Mono Lake Committee. The Bay Institute named its Harold Gilliam Award in his honor. The group also gave him its Bay Education Award in 1995.

== Personal life ==
Gilliam was married to Ann (née Thelma Ann Lawrence; 1927–2002), with whom he co-wrote two books: one in 1957, San Francisco: City at the Golden Gate, and one in 1992, Creating Carmel: The Enduring Vision. Ann Gilliam died in 2002. They had two sons. Harold Gilliam died in San Francisco in 2016 at the age of 98.

== Bibliography ==
- San Francisco Bay. Garden City, New York: Doubleday & Company. 1957 – via Internet Archive. LCCN 57-10453; OCLC 1335225 (all editions).
- (with Ann Gilliam San Francisco: City at the Golden Gate. Sketches by Fritz Busse (1903–1979). 1959 [1960] – via Internet Archive (Kahle/Austin Foundation). LCCN 59-14136; OCLC 2489342 (all editions).
- The Face of San Francisco (1960)
- For Better or for Worse: The Ecology of an Urban Area (1972)
- Island in time: The Point Reyes Peninsula (1973)
- Between the Devil & the Deep Blue Bay: The Struggle to Save San Francisco Bay (1969)
- The San Francisco Experience: The Romantic Lore Behind the Fabulous Facade of the Bay Area (1972)
- The Natural World of San Francisco (1967)
- (with Ann Gilliam) Creating Carmel: The Enduring Vision. Salt Lake City: Peregrine Smith Books. 1992 – via Internet Archive → jointly inscribed by the authors to Ann Witter Gillette (née Helen Ann Witter; 1919–2010). LCCN 91-41568 ISBN 978-0-8790-5397-0, 0-8790-5397-6 (paperback); OCLC 24796609 (all editions).
- Weather of the San Francisco Bay Region (1962; 2nd ed. 2002)
