= George Jacob =

Indian museum designer

George Jacob is a Canadian museum planner, designer, author, and futurist. He was the president and chief executive officer of Bay Ecotarium in San Francisco from January 2017 to May 2024.

== Early life ==
Jacob was born in Mumbai, India. He grew up in Rajasthan. He attended the BITS Pilani for Masters in Museum Studies. In 1996, he did his second Masters from University of Toronto in Museum Studies. In 2015, he became a Fellow of the Royal Canadian Geographical Society. He did his D.Phil. at the Royal Academy of Economics and Technology and Certifications in Executive Leadership from Yale School of Management, Singularity University, and the Claremont Graduate University Museum Leadership Institute.

== Career ==
In 2007, he led the production of the Smithsonian's 1812 Star-Spangled Banner exhibit and later set up India's Khalsa Heritage Center, a 650,000 sq. ft. museum.

In September 2014, he became the first president and chief executive officer of the Philip J. Currie Dinosaur Museum. In October 2016, Jacob was let go due to financial difficulties.

In 2018, he proposed a $260 million renovation of the Aquarium of the Bay into the Climate Resilience and Ocean Conservation Living Museum in San Francisco, and hired Jill Biden to deliver the keynote. Fundraising for the project continued through his tenure at the aquarium, but the 'Bay Ecotarium' was abandoned after the application permits expired in 2022.

He was on the International Council of Museums (ICOM USA) and ICOM-ICTOP (International Committee on Training of Museum Professionals).

As of 2019, Jacob has been involved in over 100 museums and exhibits.

In January 2017, Jacob became the president and chief executive officer of Bay Ecotarium in San Francisco. He was pressured by the organization's board to resign in May 2024, after financial concerns from the American Association of Zoos and Aquariums caused them to revoke the aquarium's accreditation and staff members raised concerns about his spending habits on personal expenses using the charity's money. Jacob said he resigned in order to pursue a "new project". "This is really the face of what I believe to be gross mismanagement," said Jon B. Fisher, who recently became chairman of the Bay.org board in 2024.
