= Avery Emerson Fisher =

American scuba diver

Avery Fisher
- Born: Avery Emerson Fisher; 2010 (age 15–16); San Francisco, California, U.S.
- Occupation: Scuba diver
- Years active: 2020–present
- Known for: Guinness World Record, Ocean conservation

Avery Emerson Fisher (born 2010) is an American scuba diver known for setting a Guinness World Record for the most underwater performances in three minutes. She has been the subject of coverage in regional and national media in connection with her diving record and conservation efforts.

== Early life and world record ==
Fisher began scuba diving in childhood and trained in underwater performance techniques sometimes described as "scuba magic". Early local coverage documented her development as a diver and performer.

In 2023, at age 13, Fisher performed 38 underwater performances in three minutes at the Aquarium of the Bay in San Francisco, exceeding the previous record of 20 and establishing a new Guinness World Record. The attempt was conducted before a live audience and certified by Guinness adjudicators.

== Career ==
Following the record, Fisher has been covered in media describing her involvement in marine conservation initiatives and youth outreach.

She participated in conservation fundraising efforts and public awareness activities related to ocean preservation.

In 2026, she was named to a youth ambassador ("Ambassadiver") role with the PADI. Additional coverage appeared in a range of media outlets. She also appeared in public forums addressing marine conservation topics, including events hosted by the Commonwealth Club of California. In October 2026, Fisher was appointed by California Governor Gavin Newsom to the California Youth Empowerment Commission, a state advisory body representing young Californians.

== See also ==
- Guinness World Records
- Scuba diving
- Marine conservation
