= CrowdOptic =

San Francisco-based medical technology company

CrowdOptic, Inc.
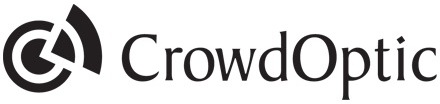
- Type: Private company
- Industry: Software, Medical technology, Computer hardware
- Founded: 2011
- Headquarters: San Francisco, United States
- Area served: Worldwide
- Key people: Jon Fisher (CEO)
- Products: Software, Mobile technology, Medical technology
- Website: www.crowdoptic.com

CrowdOptic, Inc. (known as CrowdOptic) is a privately held San Francisco-based medical technology company founded in 2011. CrowdOptic, led by CEO Jon Fisher, developed augmented reality and triangulation software used to collect and analyze data from smart devices to determine shared focal points. Its technology has been applied in areas such as healthcare, sports broadcasting, and public safety operations. In 2016, CrowdOptic started providing patented solution for wearables like Google Glass and Sony SmartEyeGlass.

== History ==
CrowdOptic was founded in 2011 by Jon Fisher, Jeff Broderick, Doug Van Blaricom, and Alex Malinovsky. The company’s software analyzes the orientation data of mobile devices to identify collective points of interest. It has been used experimentally with wearable technologies such as Google Glass and similar devices.

CrowdOptic's investors include Silicon Valley Bank, John Elway, Eric Yuan, and Ronnie Lott. The company has raised $5 million in funding.

In 2015, the company was ranked among the several firms for Google’s "Glass for Work" initiative. In July 2015, 9to5Google announced that the CrowdOptic was in acquisition talks with a Fortune 500 firm.

The following year, CrowdOptic introduced its own hardware device, called the CrowdOptic Eye, which supported live video streaming through its software.

In 2016, it launched Field App, a mobile application designed to transmit GPS and live video data from users in the field to coordinate emergency responders, firemen and police.

In August 2017, the Houston Chronicle reported that Hewlett Packard Enterprise and CrowdOptic reached a deal to combine CrowdOptic's augmented reality platform and triangulation algorithms and Hewlett Packard servers in its internet of things lab in Houston, Texas.

== Applications ==
The company is a founding certified Google Glass partner with its technology also in use by Sony, Vuzix, and Microsoft. CrowdOptic develops algorithms which let smartphones and wearables live-stream from locations such as hospital operating rooms or sports stadiums.

=== Sports ===
In 2014, CrowdOptic partnered with the Sacramento Kings to develop an alternative view of basketball games using Google Glass. The company broadcast Google Glass video footage from the perspective of players and cheerleaders on the Jumbotron and mobile devices. This technology was also implemented during warm-ups by the Stanford basketball team.

The company also partnered with the Indiana Pacers to use the technology. The footage was broadcast from the video feeds of team employees wearing Google Glass. CrowdOptic has agreements with the Philadelphia Eagles, and Sony for SmartEyeGlass to use the technology.

In August 2014, CrowdOptic partnered with NASCAR's International Speedway Corporation to broadcast live racing and behind-the-scenes footage from Google Glass.

In 2016, CrowdOptic deployed with the Denver Broncos at the AFC Championship Game in Denver, Colorado and at the Super Bowl 50 at Levi's Stadium in the San Francisco Bay Area.

=== Medicine ===
In June 2014, CrowdOptic announced a partnership with the University of California, San Francisco to stream procedures by UCSF Department of Orthopaedic Surgery faculty. The company announced in July 2014 that ProTransport-1, a California-based medical transport provider, would install Google Glass in its ambulances. Google Glass uses CrowdOptic's software to send a live video feed from an ambulance to a destination hospital.

CrowdOptic also partnered with Stanford University Medical School. The software is used to live stream surgeries to doctors and medical students wearing Google Glass. The data from the live stream is owned by Stanford University.

=== Government ===
CrowdOptic's technology has been deployed with NASA to enhance the launch and landing of a lunar lander and provide live streaming for incident response. In 2016, the company paired with Solford Industries to market a low-bandwidth live-streaming device integrated with a conventional firefighter helmet in use by fire departments, police and first responders in both the United States and China. In September 2016 CrowdOptic also deployed augmented reality for United States Special Operations Command for field personnel to report to central command about specific targets including the GPS location and a live stream of the target using CrowdOptic's triangulation algorithms.

In November 2016, CrowdOptic combined its augmented reality technology and algorithms with Portland-based SicDrone unmanned aerial vehicles and Suspect Technology's facial recognition technologies to enable emergency responders and law enforcement with surveillance and identification technology. Vice Magazine reported that the drones "fly fast, record faces in real time, recognize patterns in traffic and pinpoint people who are in the middle of an emergency."

=== Advertising ===
CrowdOptic joined with cosmetic company L'Oreal to market its products at the Luminato festival in Toronto, Ontario, Canada. L'Oreal's virtual art exhibit generated analytics that showed where people were aiming their phones.

== See also ==
- Jim Kovach
- Augmented reality
- Surveillance
