= Bay Ecotarium =

The BayEcotarium, (or Bay.org) is a merger between The Bay Institute (established 1984) and the Aquarium of the Bay (established 1996) in 2009. Headquartered in San Francisco, CA, USA, the BayEcotarium is a 501(c)(3) nonprofit dedicated to protecting, restoring and inspiring conservation of the San Francisco Bay, from the Sierra to the sea.

Formerly known as bay.org, the BayEcotarium is an amalgam of seven unique institutions located throughout the Bay area. These six institutions—the Aquarium of the Bay, the Sea Lion Center, the Bay Institute, Studio Aqua, the Bay Model Alliance and the Bay Academy—all focus on different aspects of San Francisco Bay and Sacramento-San Joaquin Delta conservation.

Led by President and CEO George Jacob, the BayEcotarium is committed to conservation education and provides free field trips to over 75,000 Bay Area students every year. These excursions are designed to teach students and teachers about the San Francisco Bay, its ecosystems, and its environmental challenges. The BayEcotarium uses classroom education, community outreach and live animal exhibitry to interpret topics like sustainable seafood, protecting marine areas, plastic pollution, climate change, and watershed health.

== History ==
The Bay Institute, a Bay Area conservation organization, acquired the Aquarium of the Bay in 2009. It transformed the privately owned aquarium into a nonprofit organization, and branded the joint-organization bay.org. Subsequently, bay.org expanded to include six more conservation-focused institutions focused on different aspects of marine education, habitat restoration and watershed preservation. In 2017, President and CEO George Jacob rebranded bay.org as the BayEcotarium.

== BayEcotarium divisions ==
Aquarium of the Bay

The Aquarium of the Bay is a non-profit, public aquarium located next to Pier 39 in San Francisco. The Aquarium is accredited by the Association of Zoos & Aquariums (AZA), is the only Smithsonian Affiliated aquarium in the state of California, and is certified as a Green Business by the city of San Francisco. The aquarium averages 500,000 visitors annually. Featuring animals from around the Bay area, the Aquarium displays about 23,000 aquatic and terrestrial animals in 33 different habitats. Highlights include two 150-ft. walk-through acrylic tunnels and a North American river otter display.

The Bay Institute

Founded in 1981, The Bay Institute is the research and advocacy arm of the Bay Ecotarium. The greater Bay ecosystem covers nearly 40% of California's land area. It encompasses the inland delta of the Sacramento and San Joaquin Rivers and the Central Valley streams, the Suisun Marsh, the San Francisco Bay itself, and the coastal waters of the Gulf of the Farallones. Using a combination of scientific research, political advocacy, and public education, the Institute focuses on the water management and economic policies necessary to ensure the health of the greater San Francisco Bay.

Studio Aqua

Driven by the growing gap in climate and ocean messaging, Studio Aqua is a mission driven strategic studio anchored in generating visual vocabulary to engage, educate and experience an environmental movement designed to inspire. The studio is integral to the BayEcotarium and works in tandem with its divisions located in the San Francisco Bay Area. It's primarily programmed to meet the interpretive planning and exhibit design requirements of the BayEcotarium and in addition offers design services to clients in the aquarium, zoos and aqua-themed endeavors from art to installation.

The Bay Model Alliance

The Bay Model Alliance is a comprehensive learning center focused on San Francisco Bay. The centerpiece of the Alliance is the Bay Model Visitor Center. Located in Sausalito, CA, the Visitor Center is administered by the U.S. Army Corps of Engineers in conjunction with the Bay Ecotarium, and showcases a working 1.5-acre model of the San Francisco Bay and the Sacramento-San Joaquin River Delta system. The walk-through model allows visitors to observe tidal action, and visualize currents and eddies as they would actually occur in the Bay, rivers, tributaries, and Delta.

The Sea Lion Center

The Sea Lion Center offers free educational programs about the California sea lions at PIER 39's K-Dock. Using presentations and interactives, the Center interprets the colony of wild California sea lions now permanently established in this unusual urban location. The educational emphasis concentrates on the natural history of California sea lions, their history at PIER 39 and the environmental threats they currently face. Over a million tourists visit K-Dock a year.

The Bay Academy

The Bay Academy consolidates and archives all Bay Institute and other educational Bay-focused publications, citations and editorials into a cohesive, easily accessible database. Production is underway to publish a series of Bay Eco books, both in print and as eBooks. Also, the academy is engaged in developing and designing curriculum-based e-learning modules for teachers and students. Additional planning includes podcasts, blogs, streaming videos, EcoCurrent newsletters, environmental posters and other educational resources that will be created and compiled by the academy.
