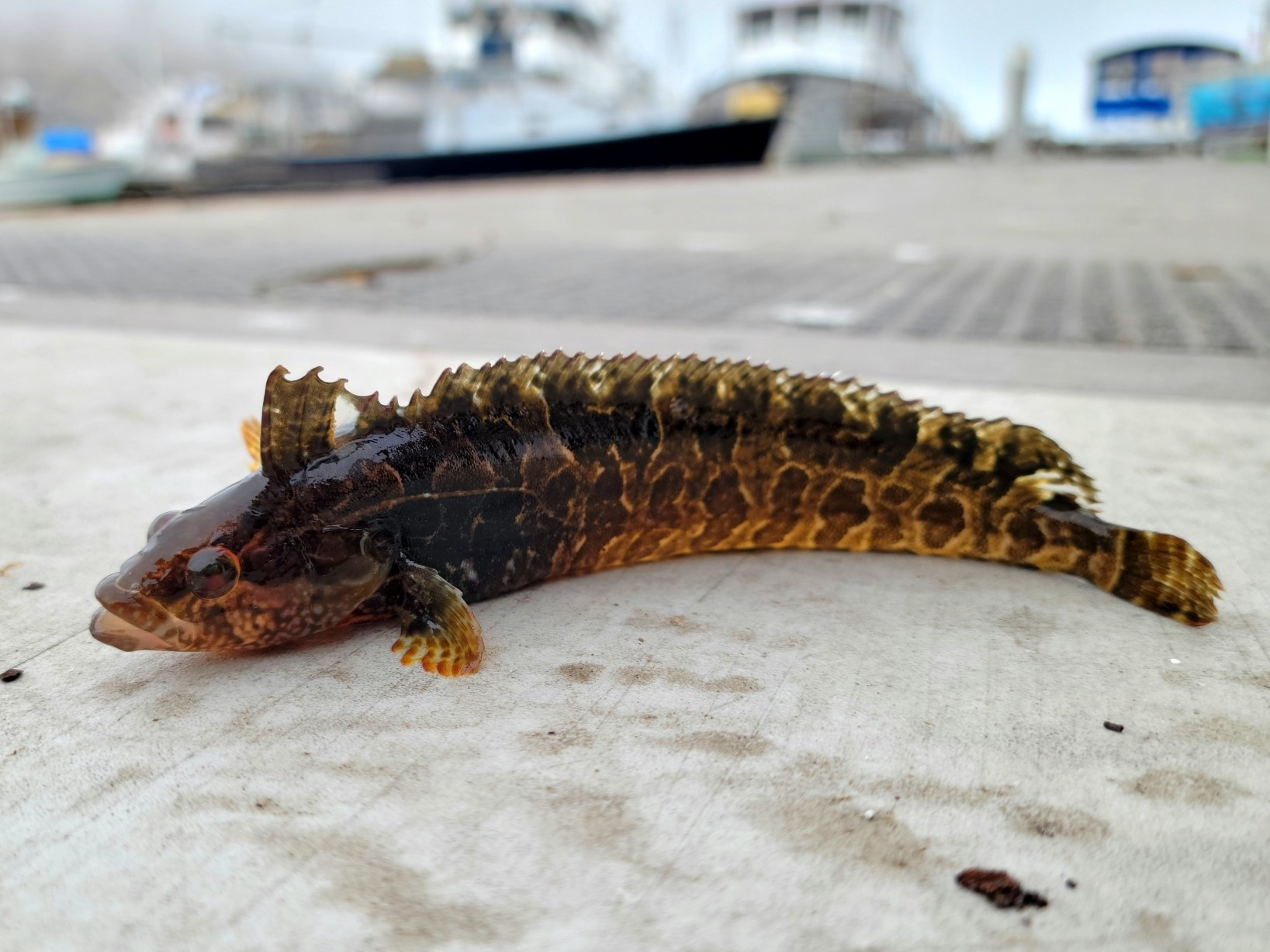

Conservation status
- Least Concern (IUCN 3.1)

Scientific classification
- Kingdom: Animalia
- Phylum: Chordata
- Class: Actinopterygii
- Division: Teleostei
- Order: Blenniiformes
- Family: Clinidae
- Genus: Gibbonsia
- Species: G. metzi

Binomial name
- Gibbonsia metzi C. L. Hubbs, 1927

= Gibbonsia metzi =

Species of fish

Gibbonsia metzi, the striped kelpfish, is a species of clinid native to the Pacific coast of North America from British Columbia, Canada, to Baja California, Mexico. It can be found in tide pools and in kelp beds down to a depth of about 9 metres (30 ft). This species can reach a maximum length of 24 centimetres (9.4 in) TL. The species can also be found in the aquarium trade. This species feeds primarily on polychaete worms. The specific name honours the geneticist Charles W. Metz (1889-1975) of the University of Pennsylvania.
