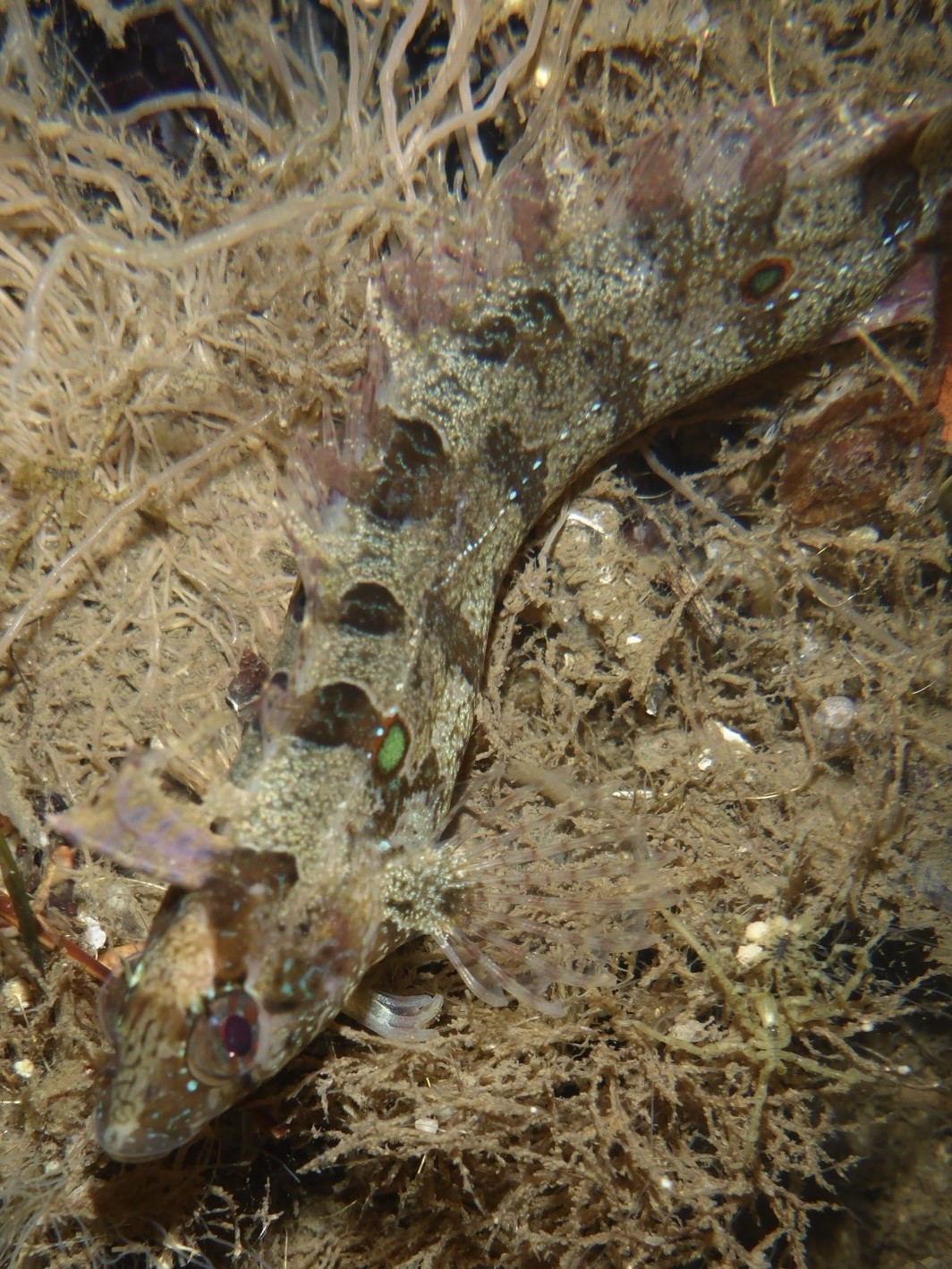

Conservation status
- Least Concern (IUCN 3.1)

Scientific classification
- Kingdom: Animalia
- Phylum: Chordata
- Class: Actinopterygii
- Division: Teleostei
- Order: Blenniiformes
- Family: Clinidae
- Genus: Gibbonsia
- Species: G. elegans

Binomial name
- Gibbonsia elegans (J. G. Cooper, 1864)

Synonyms
- Myxodes elegans J. G. Cooper, 1864; Clinus evides Jordan & Gilbert, 1883; Gibbonsia evides (Jordan & Gilbert, 1883)

= Gibbonsia elegans =

Species of fish

Gibbonsia elegans, the spotted kelpfish (called sargacero or sargacero manchado in Mexico), is a species of clinid native to subtropical waters of the Pacific Ocean from central California, U.S. to southern Baja California, Mexico. It prefers subtidal rocky habitats with seaweed down to a depth of about 56 metres (184 ft). This species can reach a maximum length of 16 centimetres (6.3 in). This species feeds on benthic crustaceans (amphipods, isopods, crabs), gastropods, and polychaete worms. The genus Gibbonsia is named after William P. Gibbons who was a naturalist in the California Academy of Science. The spotted kelpfish occurs in three different color morphs (red, green, and brown), depending on which plants occur in an individual's habitat. Males and females do not show sexual dimorphism.

== Description ==
Gibbonsia elegans is a relatively small, mottled fish with a slender body and triangular head. It has a compressed, almost angulliform body type. The maximum length the spotted kelpfish has been found to reach is 120 mm. It is unknown whether the spotted kelpfish presents a toxic hazard to humans.

Gibbonsia elegans has a terminal mouth with conical teeth on the upper and lower mandibles (meaning that its mouth ends at the point of its snout, neither angled up or down, and it teeth are sharp and narrow), as well as in the center of the roof of its mouth. The spotted kelpfish has a fleshy flap of skin above its eye, and a smaller one in front of its eye. Spotted kelpfish can have up to three spots, called ocelli, on the body. Generally, they have two ocelli; one above the pectoral fin and one positioned further posteriorally.

The spotted kelpfish's dorsal fin follows the entire length of the fish's body, from the level of its gill cover to the beginning of the caudal fin. The anterior end of the dorsal fin often sports 3-5 spiny rays. The caudal fin of Gibbonsia elegans is relatively small and has a rounded end. Like the dorsal fin, the anal fin of the spotted kelpfish is long, stretching from the caudal fin to further than halfway up the fish's abdomen. The fins of the spotted kelpfish are often semi-transparent.

Gibbonsia elegans is found in various color morphs; mainly red, brown or green. The spotted kelpfish has disruptive coloration that resembles military camouflage patterning–dark, broken, vertical bars against a background of one or two colors. This patterning extends into the dorsal and pelvic fins and covers the entire surface of the fish's body. Male and females are not distinct in their color morphology i.e. they are not sexually dimorphic. Instead, they exhibit sexual differences in body size and the color of their bellies. They show dichromatism in their belly color; Females have yellow or tan bellies and males and immature females have white bellies. Secondly, females grow to be longer in length than males.

== Habitat and distribution ==
The spotted kelpfish is found in the shallow, rocky, coastal waters of southern California (including Baja) and requires aquatic vegetation in its habitat. It is sometimes found in calm bays but is most common along stretches of open coast. Some common plants found in the spotted kelpfish's habitat are green surfgrass, brown algae, and red algae. The spotted kelpfish inhabits depths ranging from the lower intertidal level (from 0 to 1.2 meters below mean sea level) to about 30m. As mentioned previously, kelpfish are found in various color morphs that match their plant habitat. In that effort, they are found in red, green or brown forms. They are capable of changing their color over a period of time (within several weeks). According to a 1988 study by Stepien et al., color changes in kelpfish are determined solely by the color of their habitat and not by their diet. Color changes are also dependent on season. In the study, more red Gibbonsia elegans were found in the winter, when red algae were dominant. In the spring and summer, the green and brown morphs were more prevalent. Male and female Gibbonsia elegans are commonly found in different vertical distributions. Females are more frequently found in shallow habitats whereas males are found more commonly at greater depths.

A 1990 study performed by Holbrook et al. examined the relationship between the distribution of giant kelp in reefs and the abundance of fishes living in those reefs. The study hypothesized that the spotted kelpfish might be adversely affected by very high densities of Giant Kelp, because the smaller, understory algae–on which the spotted kelpfish depends–is outcompeted by the larger vegetation. The following was written about this in Holbrook et al.'s paper: "We expect that other reef fishes that require foliose understory algae will be adversely affected by the shading effect of giant kelp. For example, the spotted kelpfish (Gibbonsia elegans) requires foliose understory algae throughout its benthic life. Planktonic larvae recruit to understory algae, where older individuals remain to hide from predators and feed on small invertebrates (Stepien, 1986). Carr (1989) found that populations of this species were adversely affected by giant kelp, again through the reduction of understory algae. We suspect, however, giant kelp will affect the occurrence (presence-absence) of such species as striped surfperch and Gibbonsia only when the forest is so dense that all appropriate understory algae are eliminated."

A 2020 study performed by Ginther and Steele examined the impacts of an invasive species of algae–Sargassum horneri–on temperate reef fish, including the spotted kelpfish. The study concluded that reef fishes were hardly or not at all impacted by the invasive algae species, despite its widespread presence in many coastal areas. The paper authors wrote, "our field experiment, in which S. horneri was completely removed from 6×6m plots on natural reefs, provided the most compelling evidence that fishes were not much affected by the invasive alga, given the lack of differences in fish density, species richness, diversity, and multivariate assemblage structure between plots with and without S. horneri."

== Diet ==
The spotted kelpfish feeds largely on epiphytic crustaceans, such as gammarid amphipods and flabilliferan isopods^{.} Examples include the hump-backed shrimp, Spirontocaris paludicola, and S. picta. Spirontocaris picta was found to be the significant portion of Gibbonsia elegans' stomach content in one study. These crustaceans are found on the same plants that Gibbonsia elegans live on, including brown and red algae. The epiphytic crustaceans also match the color of their plant habitat. In addition to crustaceans, polychaete worms and microgastropods have been found in abundance in the stomach contents of spotted kelpfish.

== Biology ==
Spotted kelpfish reach sexual maturity when they have grown to around 60mm. Their spawning season is from January through June. In the spawning season, spotted kelpfish females will lay their eggs in short aquatic vegetation. The females lay their eggs periodically until a mass of eggs has accumulated, occasionally pushing seaweed into the egg mass. The spawning process was described as the following in Feder et al.'s observations: "during spawning process, male brings vent as close to female as possible without pushing her. Then he quivers, becomes rigid, and eventually falls back. Male interrupts spawning to drive away intruders, including larger fishes.".

In 2017, a study by Passerelli et al. discovered a new parasitic copepod preying on spotted kelpfish and two other kelpfish species (striped kelpfish and giant kelpfish)--the first ectoparasitic species discovered infecting spotted and striped kelpfish. The parasitic copepod in question is called Lepeophtheirus schaadti n. sp. This parasite preys especially on teleosts and occurs most diversely in temperate latitudes.

== Human Uses ==
The spotted kelpfish has been deemed economically insignificant to humans except for its contribution to the diet of certain game fishes. One source claims that the spotted kelpfish is occasionally caught by fishers using small hooks in rocky or kelp areas of the California coast, but that the fish is too small to be of value for food use.

== Related species ==
The giant kelpfish, Heterostichus rostratus, is another species of the family Clinidae that closely resembles Gibbonsia elegans. It is found in Southern California areas similar to Gibbonsia elegans. The two species also occurs in similar color morphs; red, green, and brown. However, Heterostichus grows up to 61 cm in length, about four times longer than Gibbonsia elegans. One visible feature that sets the two species apart is the caudal fin; in spotted kelpfish, the caudal fin is rounded. In giant kelpfish, the caudal fin is forked.

Another fish species with which the spotted kelpfish may be confused is the crevice kelpfish (Gibbonsia montereyensis), which is said to inhabit deeper waters than the spotted kelpfish.
