= Aquarium of the Bay =

Public aquarium in San Francisco, California, United States

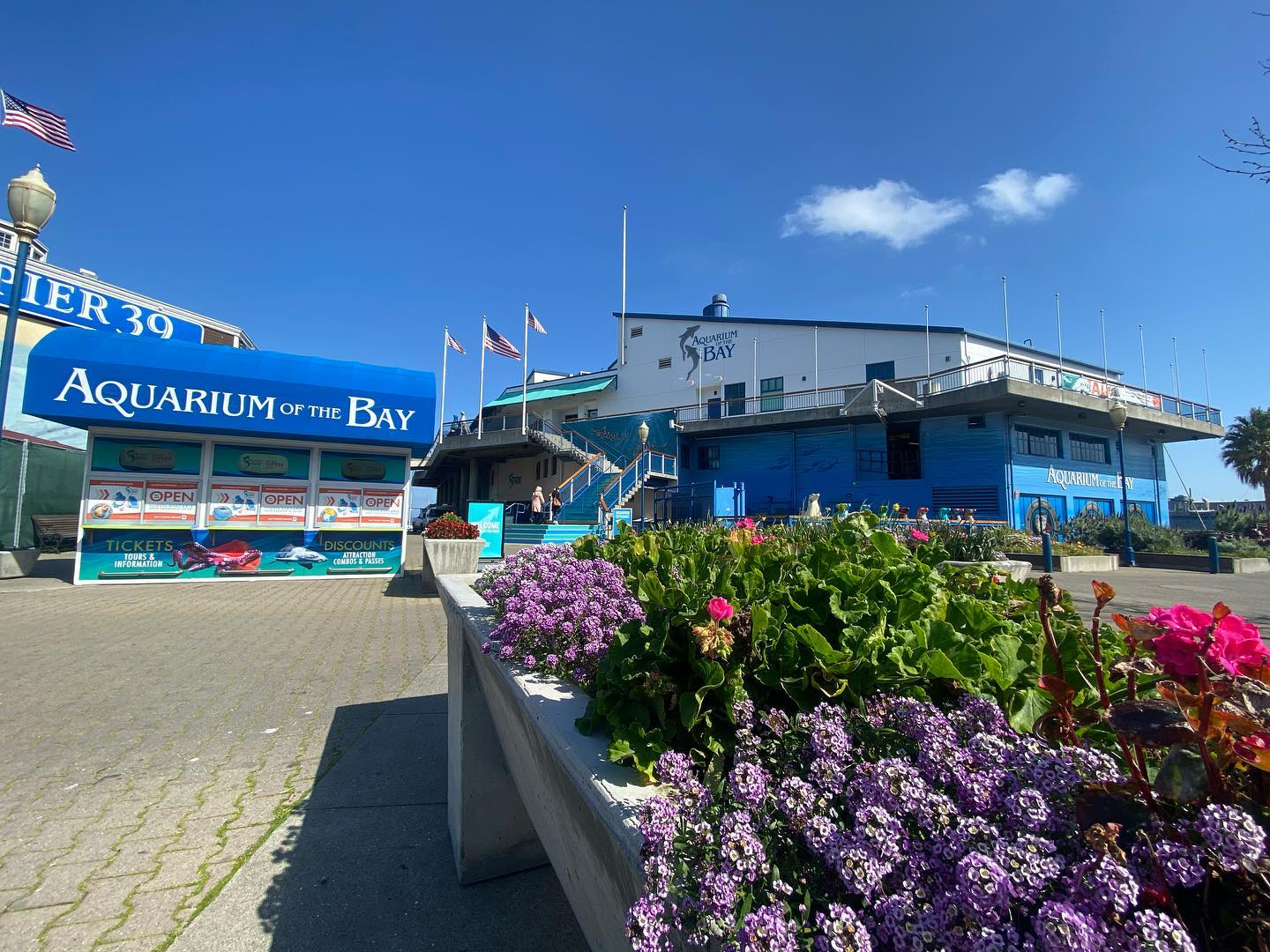
- Aquarium of the Bay Exterior
- Interactive map of Aquarium of the Bay
- 37.8088°N 122.4093°W
- Date opened: 19 April 1996 (30 years ago)
- Location: San Francisco, California, United States
- Land area: 65,000 sq ft (6,000 m^{2})
- No. of animals: 24,000
- No. of species: 200
- Volume of largest tank: 770,000
- Total volume of tanks: 770,000 US gal (2,900,000 L)
- Annual visitors: 600,000
- Management: Jon Fisher (chairman)
- Website: aquariumofthebay.org

Aquarium of the Bay is a public aquarium located at The Embarcadero and Beach Street, at the edge of Pier 39 in San Francisco, California. The aquarium is focused on local aquatic animals from the San Francisco Bay and neighboring rivers and watersheds as far as the Sierra Mountains. Since 2005 the Aquarium has focused its mission on enabling ocean conservation and climate action both locally and globally. It is one of seven institutions under parent company Bay Ecotarium, the largest watershed conservation organization in the Bay Area

The Aquarium of the Bay is a Smithsonian Affiliate and certified as a Green Business by the city of San Francisco. It contains over 770,000 gallons of salt water that over 24,000 animals from 200+ species call home. It is the only Smithsonian-affiliated aquarium in the state of California. As of May 2025, it is led by Jon Fisher, Dan Ashley, and John McAteer.

== History ==
=== Initial plans ===
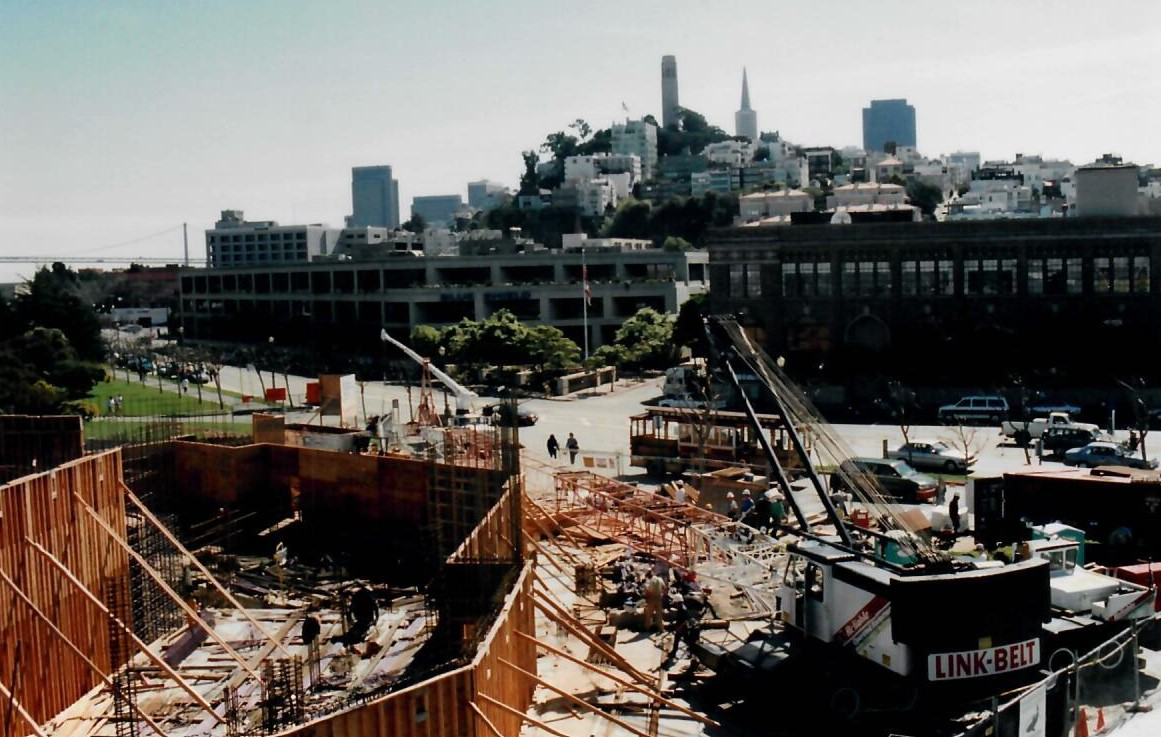
Construction of the aquarium

The aquarium was first scheduled to be opened in the summer of 1988, but construction on the aquarium was delayed due to protests from merchants on Fisherman's Wharf and San Francisco Bay environmental groups, and ground was not broken until July 1995. Specific objections included the amount of fill required (an additional 24,000 square feet (2,200 m^{2}) would need to be reclaimed from the Bay) and a potential violation of the city's 1990 Proposition H, which prohibits nonmaritime use of waterfront property. The aquarium was privately owned by a partnership of Questar of New Zealand, Aquabay Inc., and Pedersen Associates (The Chronicle Publishing Company, which owned the San Francisco Chronicle, was a minority partner in Pedersen).

Original estimates for attendance in the final environmental impact report ranged up to 28,000 daily visitors on the weekend in its inaugural year, and the aquarium was forced to limit attendance to no more than 12,600 visitors per day to gain approval. Some of the conditions imposed by the Bay Conservation and Development Commission when it issued the permits included requirements to use only species found in San Francisco Bay and to provide educational and outreach programs. In addition, the aquarium was forced to rent overflow parking spaces at Levi's Plaza and pay subsidies to Muni to fund additional buses to Pier 39 to handle the expected crowds. Together, these traffic abatement measures would cost the aquarium US$100,000 (equivalent to $205,000 in 2025) in 1996. In addition, the California Academy of Sciences (CAS) was to receive annual payments of US$200,000 (equivalent to $401,000 in 2025) for eight years, starting in 1997, to compensate for the projected decrease in visitors to Steinhart Aquarium, but the payments were never made. Willie Brown was involved in the negotiations leading to the annual payments.

=== Opened as UnderWater World ===
The signature attraction, two long acrylic underwater tunnels with approximately 770,000 total gallons of San Francisco Bay salt water. It includes sharks, bat rays, rock fish, and two giant sea bass. The aquarium opened on 19 April 1996 under the name UnderWater World at a cost of US$38,000,000 (equivalent to $80,290,000 in 2025), filled with approximately 4,000 fish with 100 unique species indigenous to San Francisco Bay. After being shown a short introductory film, visitors walk through an area with three pools, then take an elevator down to the signature attraction, which is two acrylic tunnels 360-foot (110 m) long overall that cuts through two tanks filled with total of 707,000 US gallons (2,680,000 L; 589,000 imp gal) of filtered water from the bay, based on a similar transparent tunnel in an aquarium of the same name in Auckland, New Zealand. Prior to opening, annual attendance was projected at 1.6 million visitors, and initial ticket prices were US$13.50 (equivalent to $27.71 in 2025) for adults, US$6.75 (equivalent to $13.86 in 2025) for children.

Fifteen months after opening, attendance was poor, with only 3,500 tickets sold per day on average (2,800 to 3,900 per day during the summer of 1996, reaching a peak of 5,700 on 4 July 1996), far fewer than original estimates of 9,100 daily tickets in a building with a capacity of 12,600 daily visitors. UnderWater World responded by cutting ticket prices to US$12.95 (equivalent to $25.97 in 2025), the city planning commission removed the requirement for subsidised parking and buses, and Pier 39 vowed to paint the exterior with murals, create joint marketing opportunities with other San Francisco institutions, and bring in more impressive animals. Despite these measures, attendance remained poor and some unimpressed visitors quipped the aquarium should be renamed "Underwhelming World." Other visitors were confused by the aquarium's content, which had no whales or large sharks despite large exterior murals featuring the same. UnderWater World filed for Chapter 11 bankruptcy on 10 March 1999.

=== Renamed to Aquarium of the Bay ===
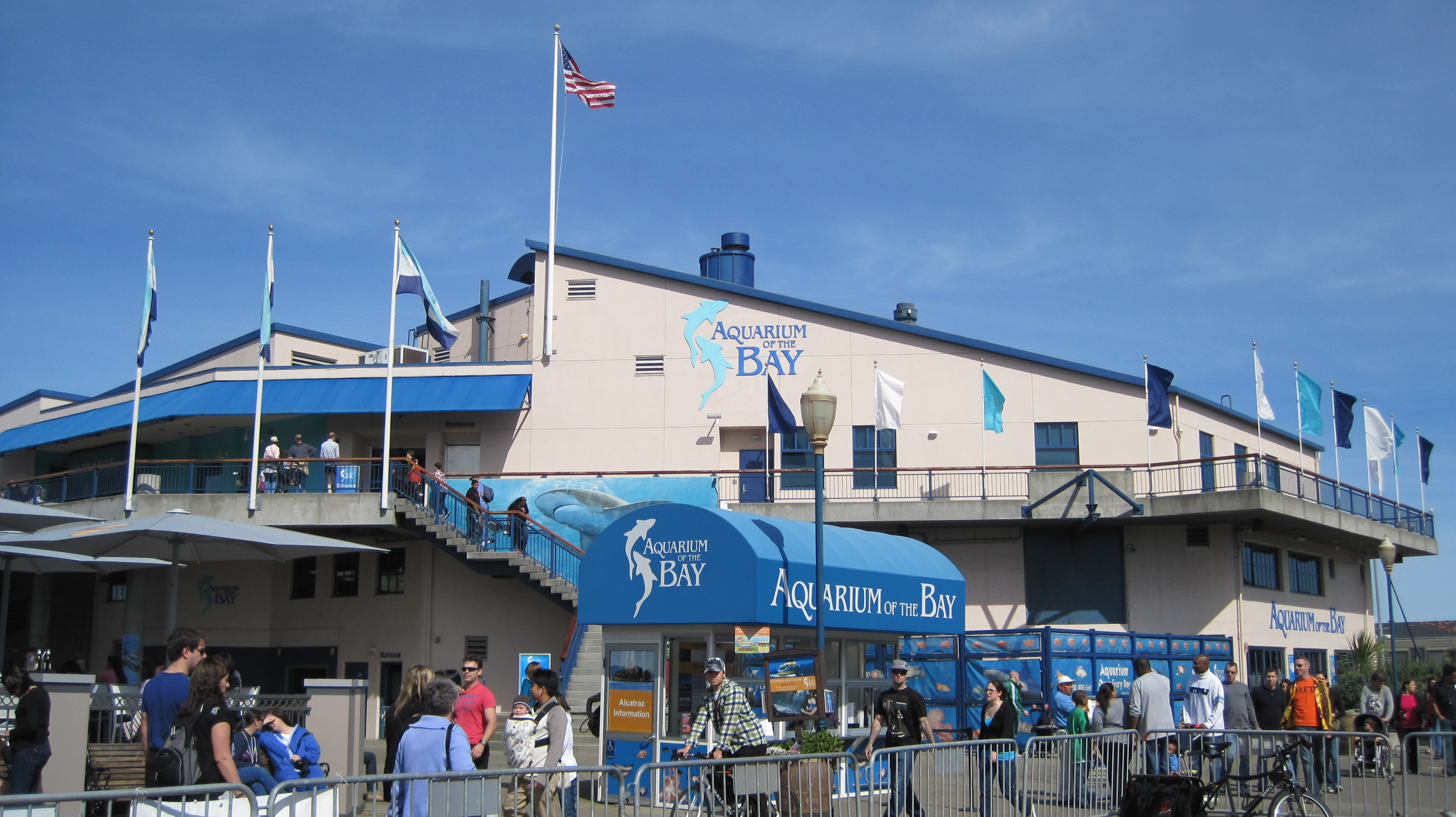
Aquarium of the Bay at Pier 39.

UnderWater World was sold to a group led by BNP Paribas in June 2000, who announced plans to rename it to Aquarium of the Bay and add more sea animals in 2001. Attendance had continued to decline down to approximately 1,000 daily visitors in 2001. The original aquarium was remodeled at a cost of nearly $2 million and relaunched as Aquarium of the Bay during a private party on the evening of 12 July 2001.

Under its new name, Aquarium of the Bay added new attractions and had 273 species and more than 60,000 fish in 2001.

=== Repairs and Renovations ===
Since its opening in 1996, Aquarium of the Bay started to see the original infrastructure deteriorate and need repairs. In 2020, many of those issues were addressed. They installed a new jellyfish culture/rearing system to ensure a healthy population in the aquarium, as well as donate to other affiliated organizations. Also included in the necessary upgrades were the elevators, raw water pumps, sprinklers, and a new chiller compressor to regulate tank temperatures.

=== Reception ===
In 2024, former Aquarium of the Bay CEO George Jacob resigned following the exposure of his personal expenses assigned to Aquarium of the Bay including $286k on luxury hotels and flights and another $461k on a Stewart Copeland concert. The entity's accreditation from the Association of Zoos and Aquariums was revoked in May 2024 following findings of deteriorated equipment and poor regulation of animal tank water temperature. Staff at the facility claimed 30% of the animals needed to be housed elsewhere as a result of the conditions. San Francisco-based Jon Fisher was appointed chairman of the board of the organization just prior to the investigation.

== Education ==
Of the varied education programs, Aquarium of the Bay has hosted educational activities for more than 220,000 local students and teachers. The educational programs primarily focus around the themes of ocean conservation, climate change action, habitat protection.

=== High School Internship Program ===
The aquarium received funding from the San Francisco Public Utilities Commission (SFPUC) to create an internship program for select high schools. Throughout the Coronavirus pandemic in 2020, this program had to be moved to a virtual setting. The internships involved different aspects under the aquarium umbrella like social media management, as well as teaching students essential career-building skills such as writing resumes, interview techniques, and presentation skills. By the end of the program, the students culminated their newfound skills, created and shared a presentation on their climate project.

=== K-12 Field Trips ===
Within some of the education and outreach programs for schools, the Aquarium of the Bay offers field trips that support Next Generation Science Standards (NGSS). Some programs are offered on a scholarship basis for Title 1 schools, and are otherwise free of charge for self-guided tours.

=== Bay Academy ===
The aquarium offers several classroom programs for children of varying ages. For kindergarteners, they offer "Between the Tides," which is a program in which the children explore the tidepools along the Bay Area coastline. For 1st through 3rd graders, the aquarium offers a program to teach them about the life cycle of a salmon from egg to adulthood in the San Francisco Bay, Pacific Ocean, and rivers of California. They also offer virtual lessons over Zoom for all ages K-12.

=== Project WATERS ===
Short for Watershed and Trout Education for Regional Stewardship, in which classes from San Francisco can host and learn about rainbow trout in their classroom.

=== Nonprofit Education and Research Center ===
After restoring the aquarium to solvency, BNP Paribas put the Aquarium of the Bay up for sale in August 2005. The Bay Institute was approached to potentially enter a partnership prior to the sale, but the Institute did not have the funds required to purchase the aquarium outright. A local businessman, Darius Anderson, owner of Kenwood Investments, put up the funds to create a competitive bid, with a condition allowing The Bay Institute to purchase it from Kenwood Investments in a few years' time at a predetermined price, which would eventually transform the aquarium's mission from entertainment to a nonprofit education and research center.

Bids were presented to the Bay Conservation and Development Commission in November 2005, whose executive director Will Travis stated all bidders agreed to comply with prior permit conditions (only Bay species, education and outreach mission). The Bay Institute/Kenwood Investments offer was selected in June 2006, beating out a competing bid from Ripley Entertainment and a late bid from Merlin Entertainments. The Bay Institute would exercise its option to purchase the aquarium, completing its acquisition of the Aquarium of the Bay in June 2009 for US$9,500,000 (equivalent to $14,257,000 in 2025).

==== Research Activities ====
Since coming under the control of The Bay Institute, Aquarium of the Bay staff have assisted in tagging sevengill sharks in an effort to study the life and activities of the species, which has a nursery ground in San Francisco Bay. Aquarium of the Bay has collaborated with a researcher named Matt Savoca at UC Davis to study olfactory reception in anchovies and plastic uptake. The aquarium also worked with a Smithsonian research for a few years to try to catalogue and remove an invasive kelp species, though that project is no longer active. Additionally, Aquarium of the Bay has performed and collaborated in several research projects in relation to elasmobranchs, sevengill sharks, and Pacific angel sharks specifically.

== Exhibits ==
The aquarium is divided into four exhibit areas.

=== Discover the Bay ===
This exhibit has a variety of satellite tanks containing animals such as moray eels, anchovies, rockfish, Monkeyfaced eels, perch, decorator crabs, urchins, garibaldi (the California state marine fish), and more.

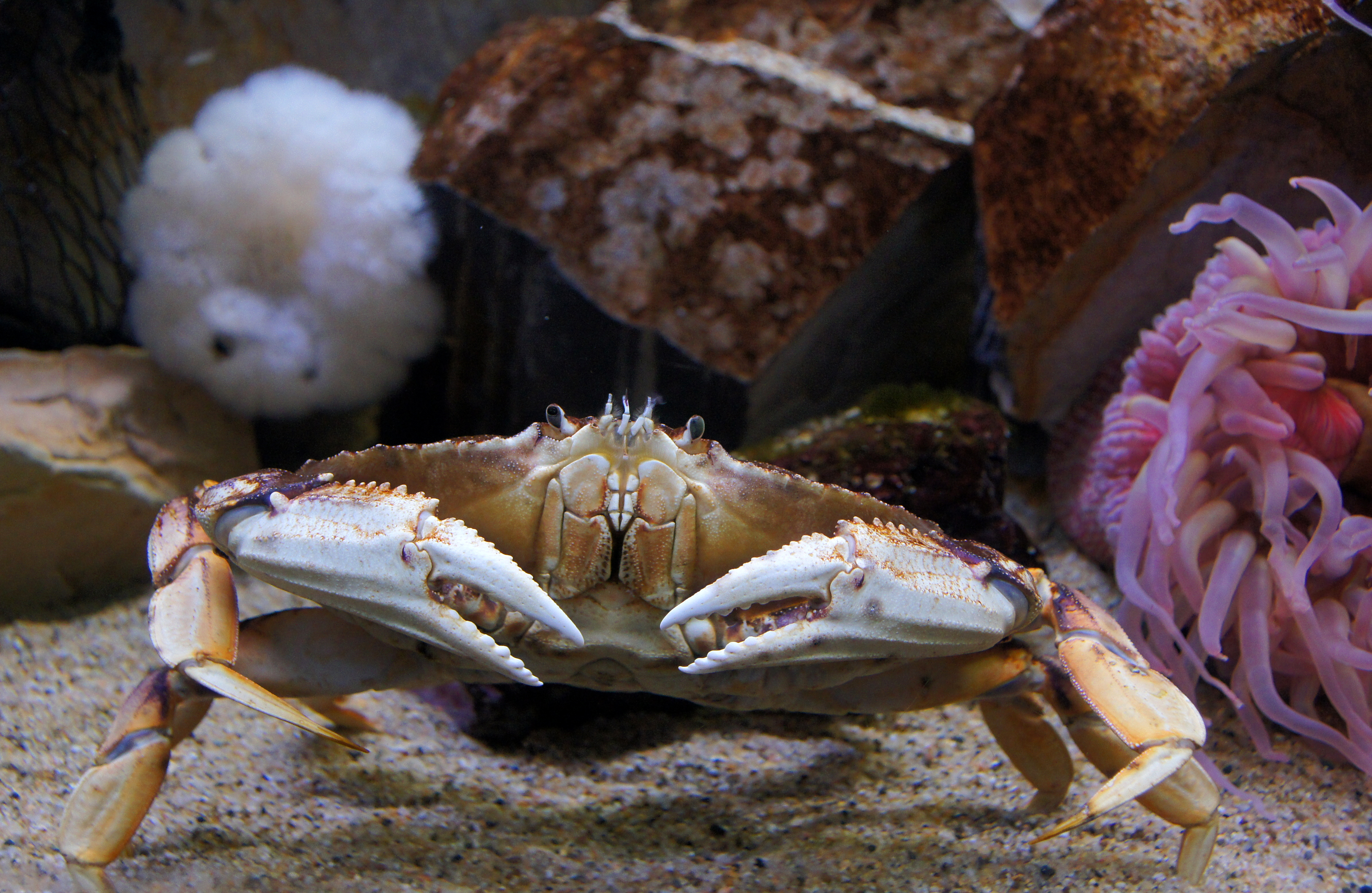
Dungeness crab on exhibit

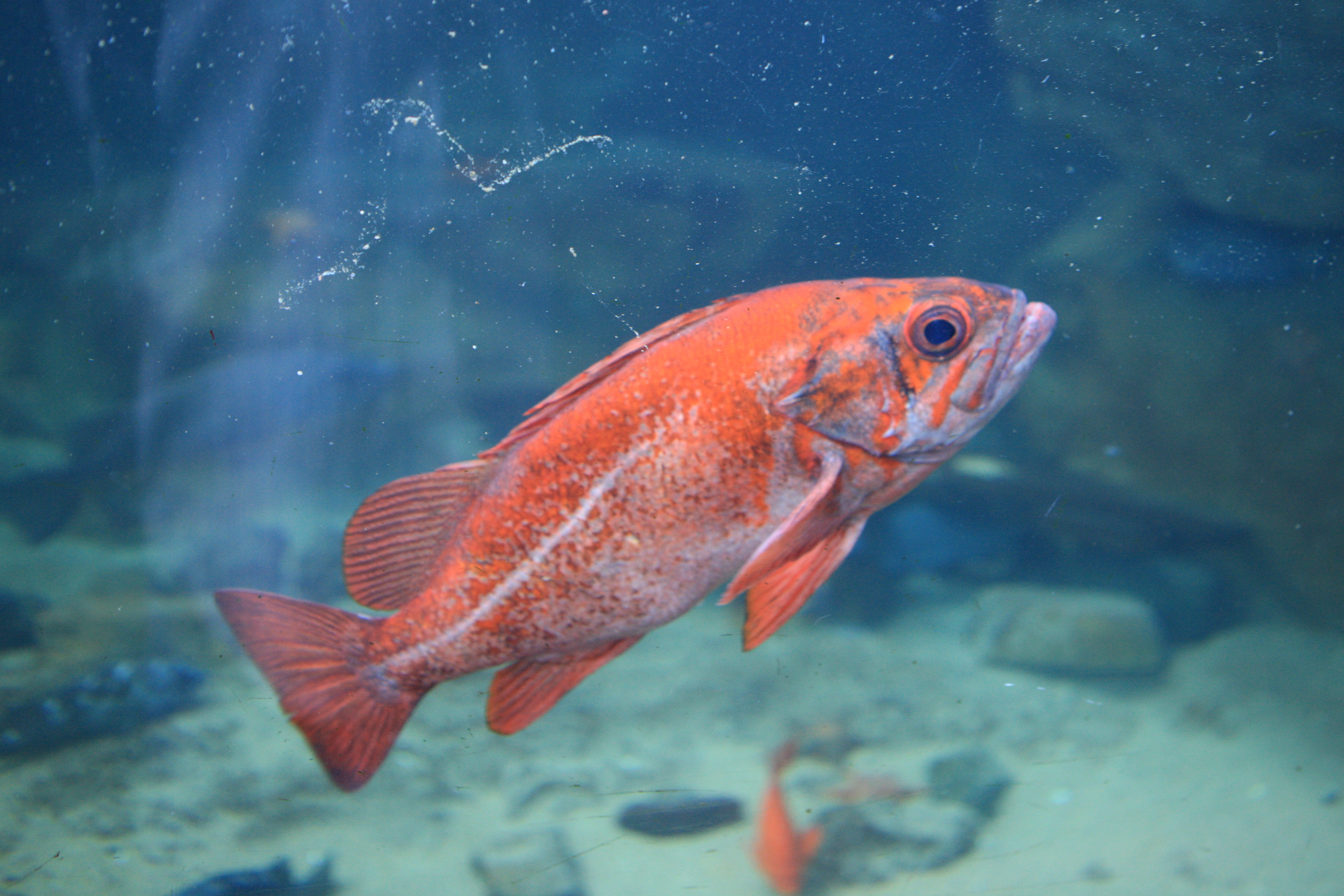
Rockfish

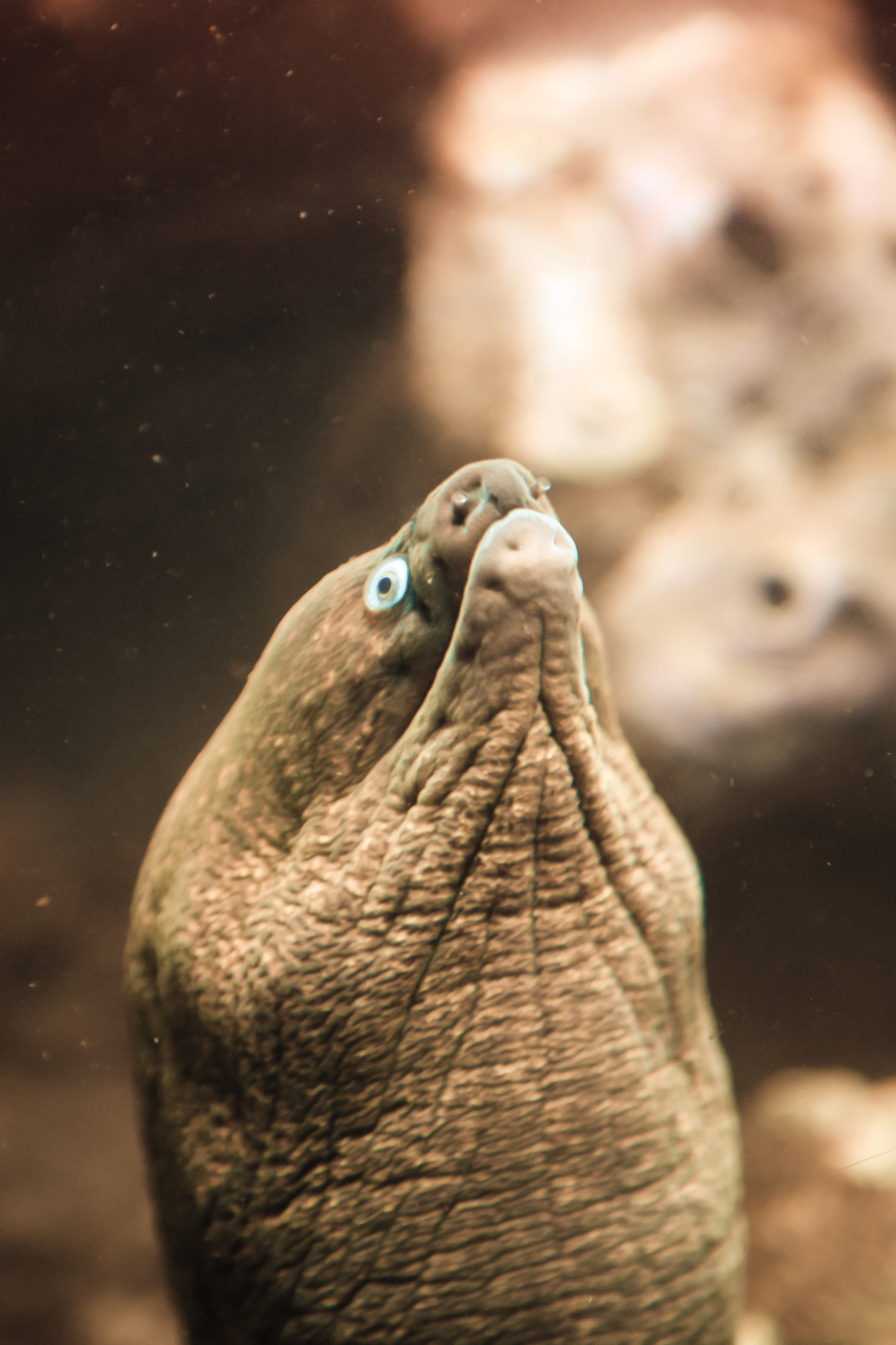

=== Under the Bay ===
This is the aquarium's largest exhibit. It includes 300 feet (91 m) of tunnels and features thousands of aquatic animals and other sea creatures such as jellies. The exhibit is a recreation of the San Francisco Bay.

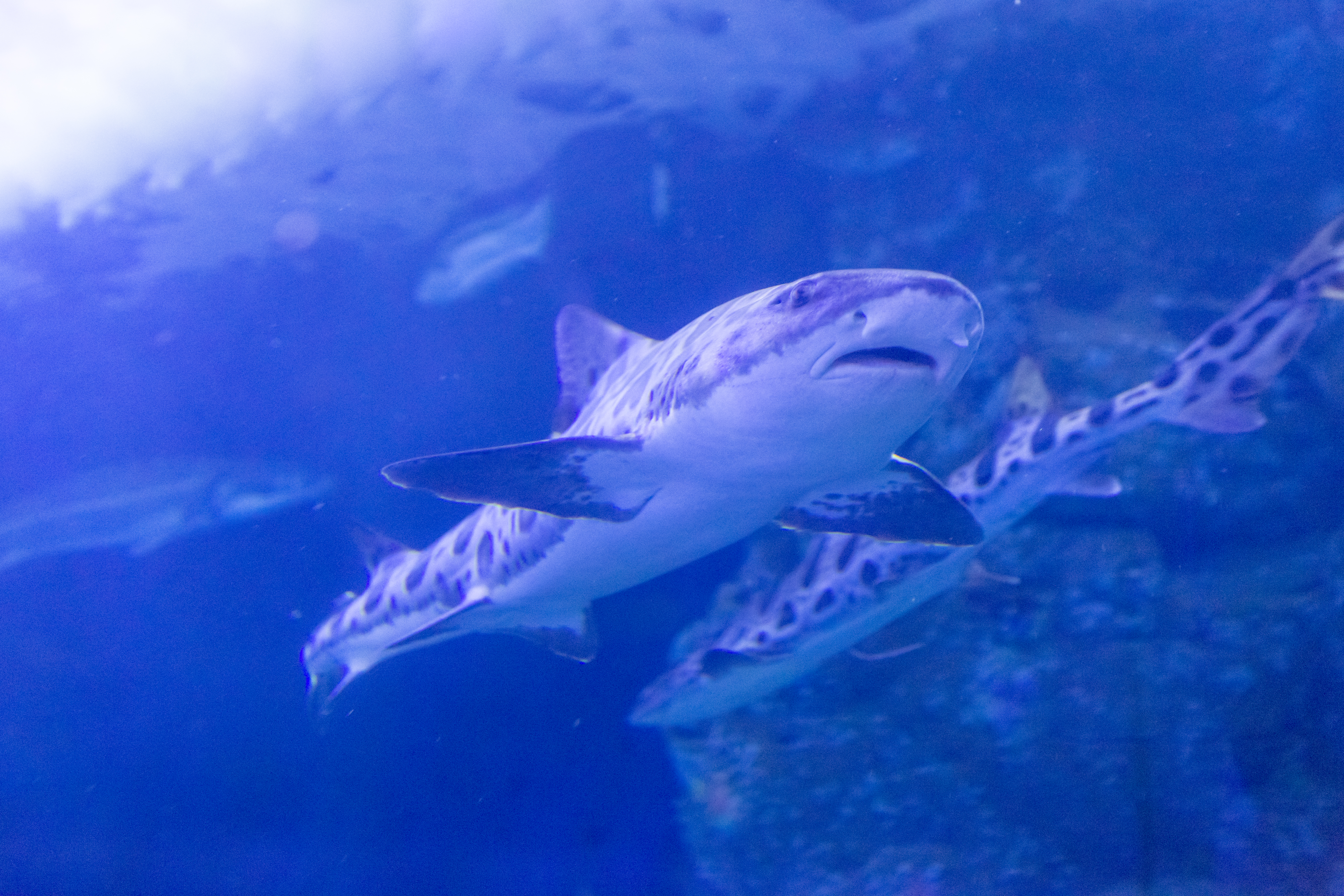
Leopard sharks

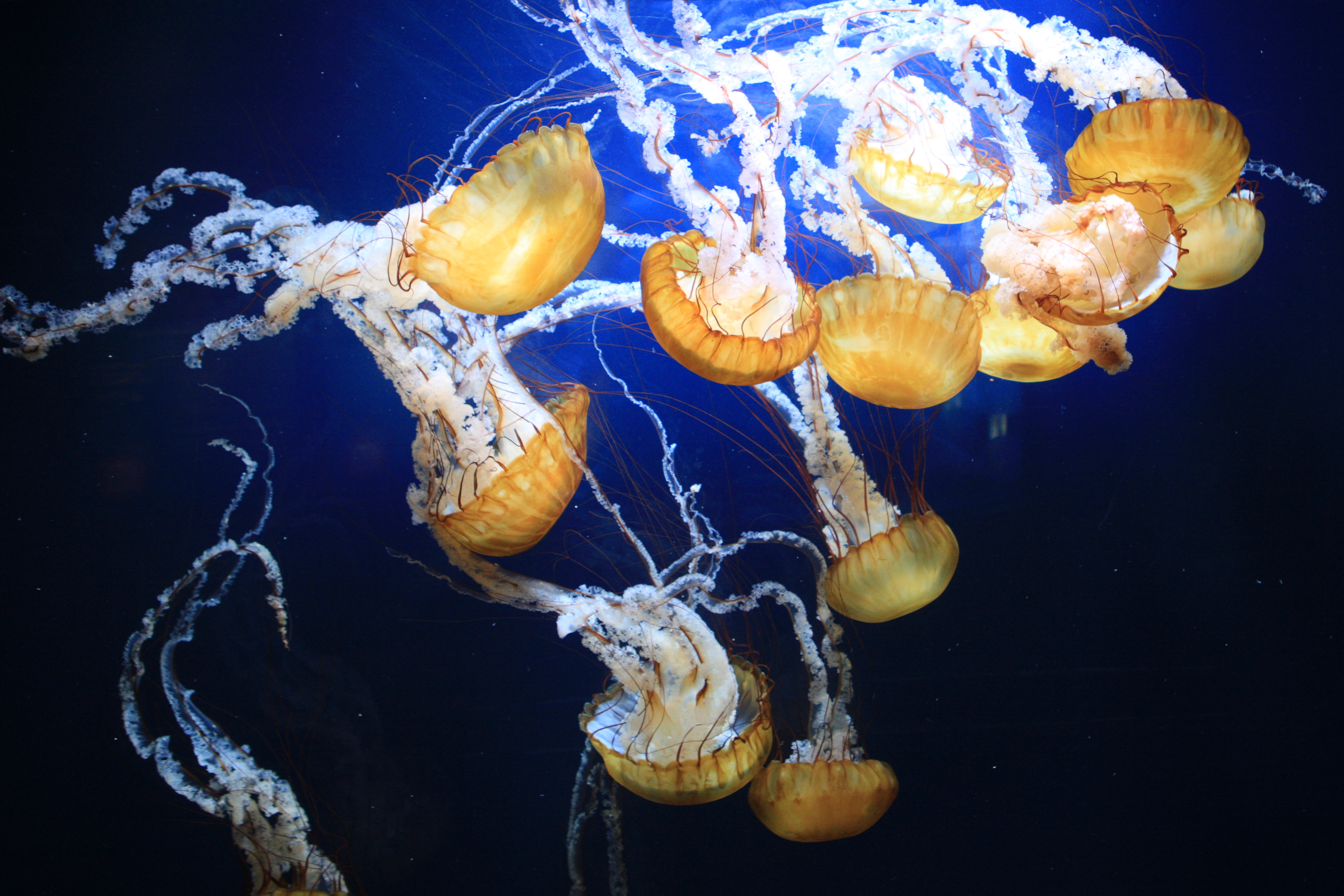
Japanese sea-nettle

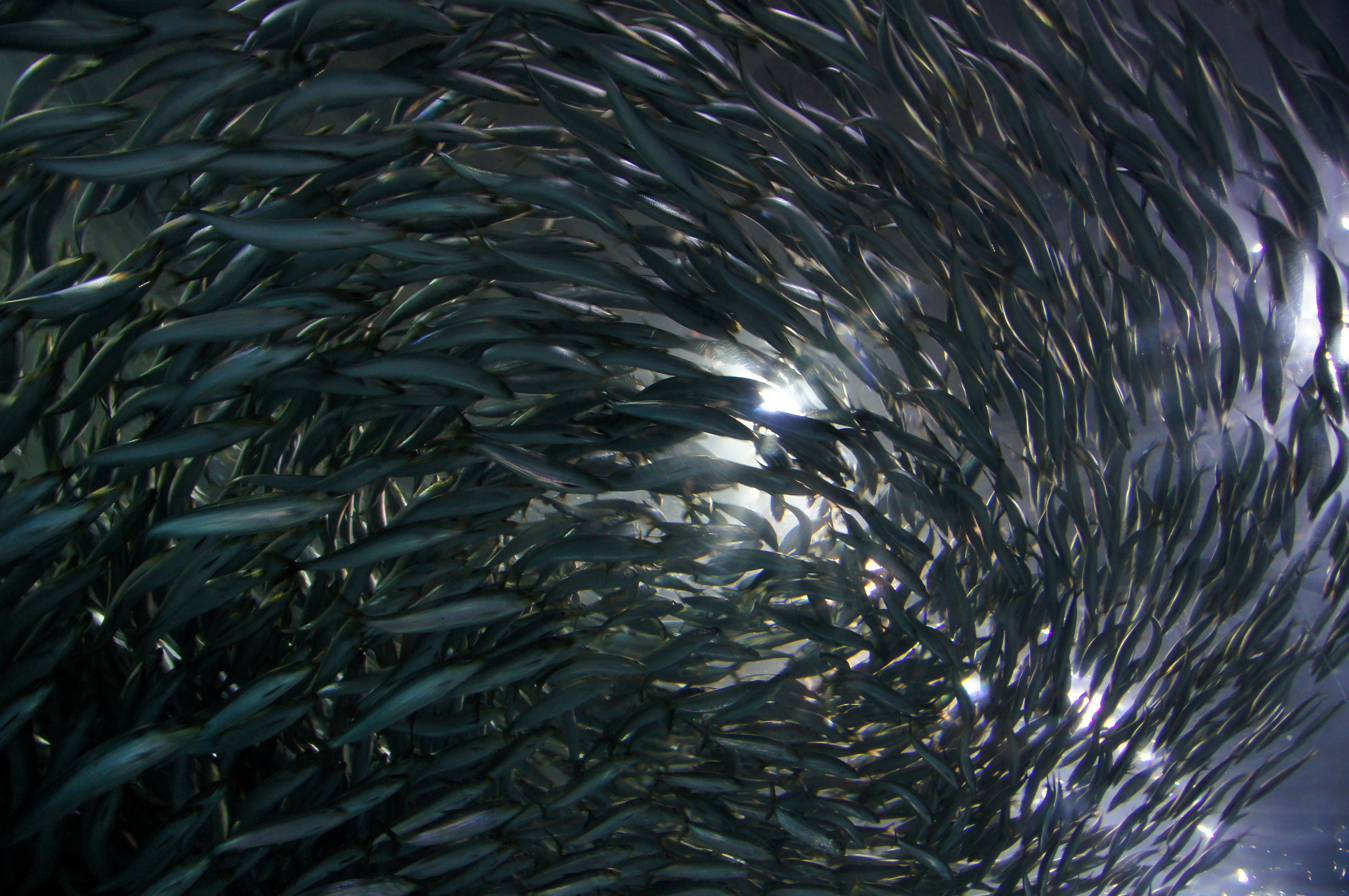

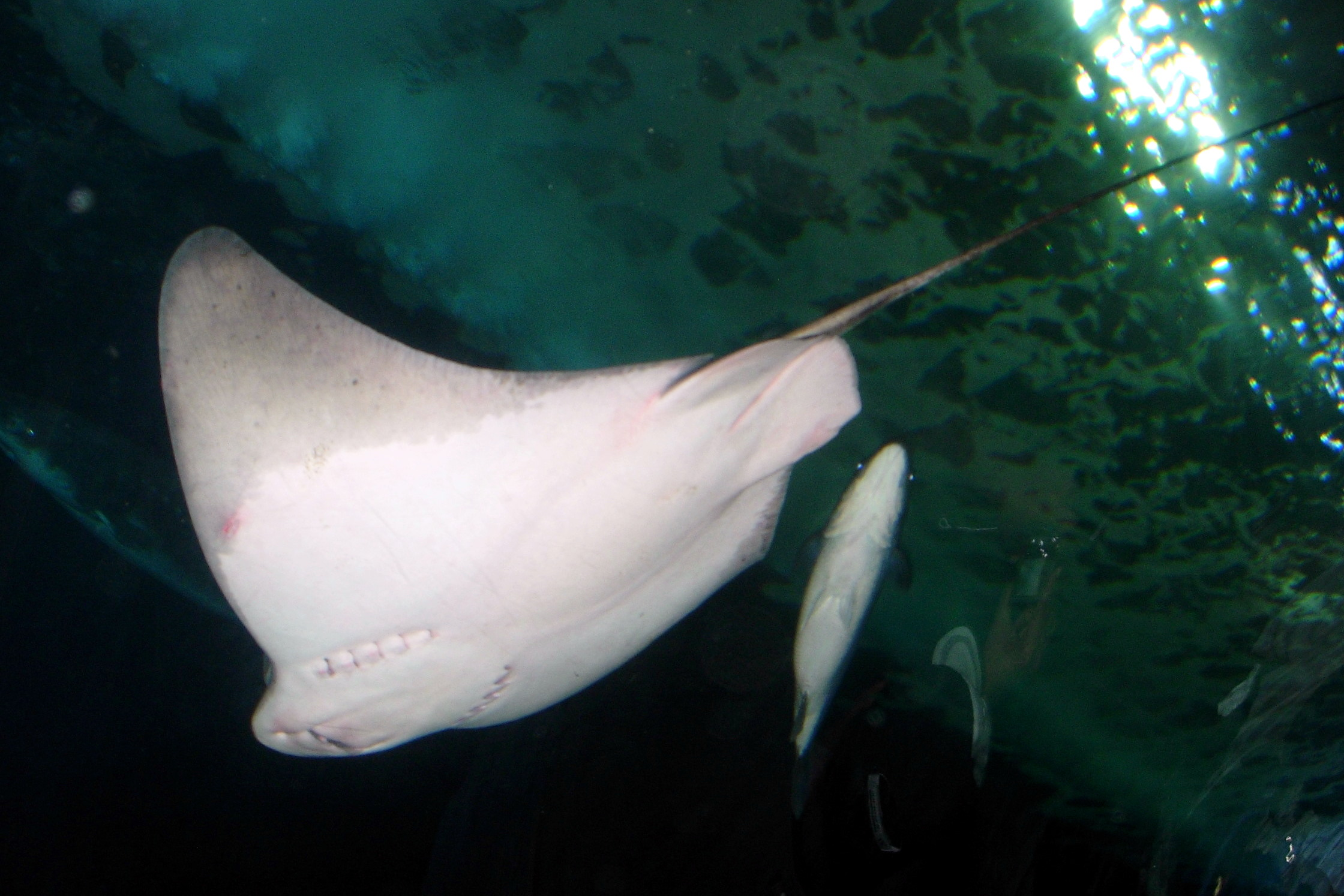
A bat ray at Aquarium of the Bay

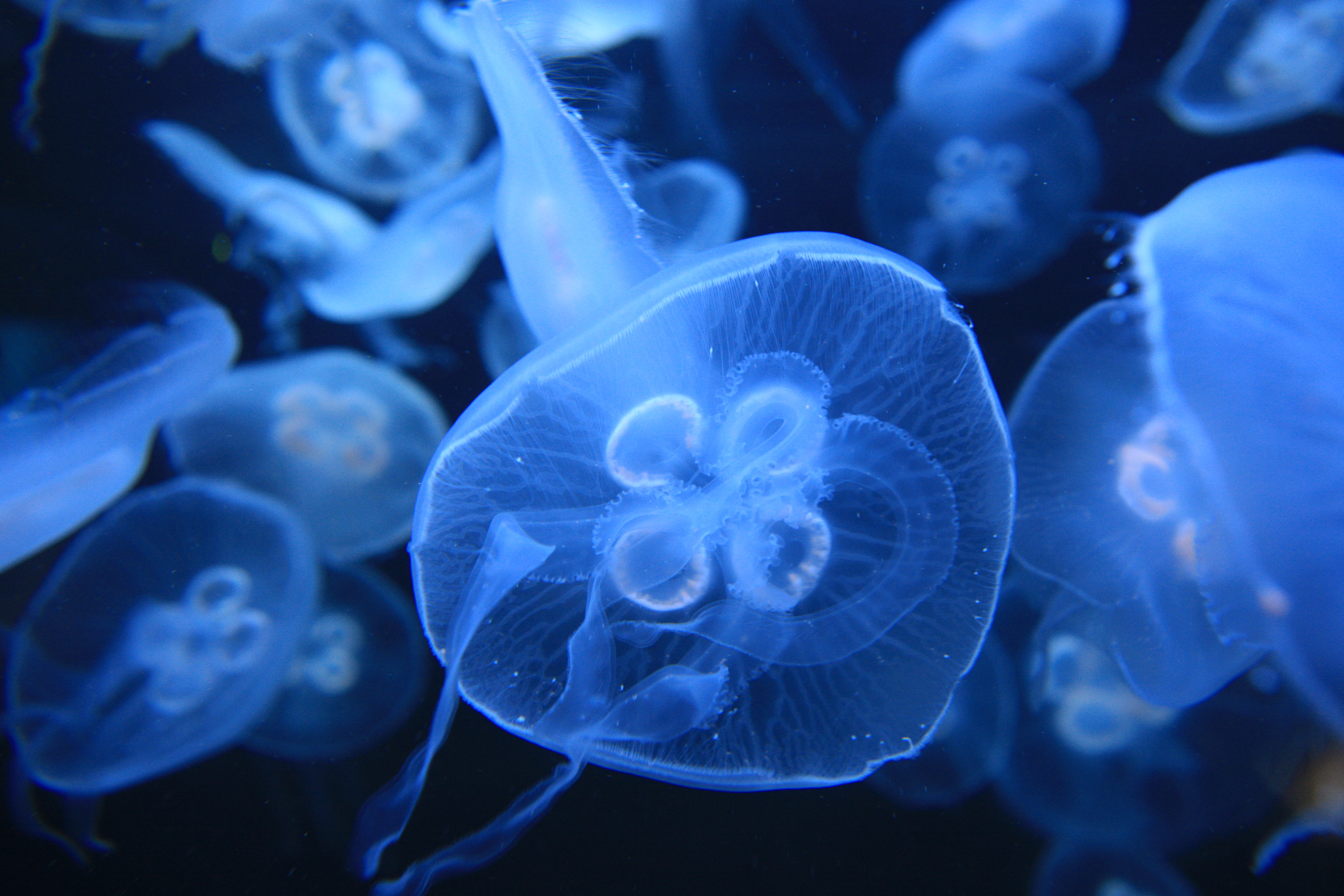
Moon jellies (Aurelia aurita)

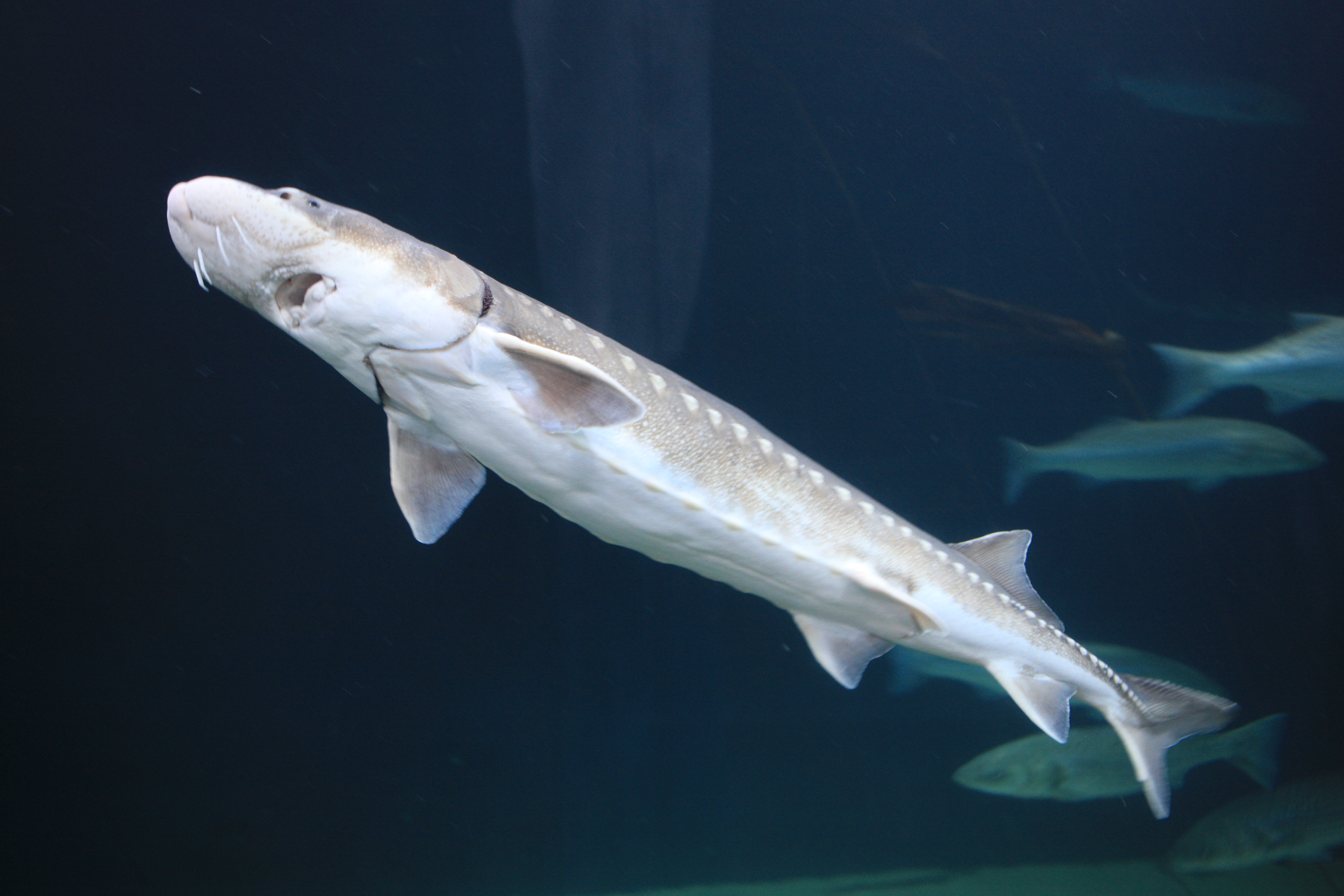
White sturgeon (Acipenser transmontanus)

=== Touch the Bay ===
This exhibit lets visitors touch several types of animals including bat rays, skates, leopard sharks, sea stars, anemones, and sea cucumbers. There are also terrestrial animals such as frogs, toads, newts, snakes, and skinks.

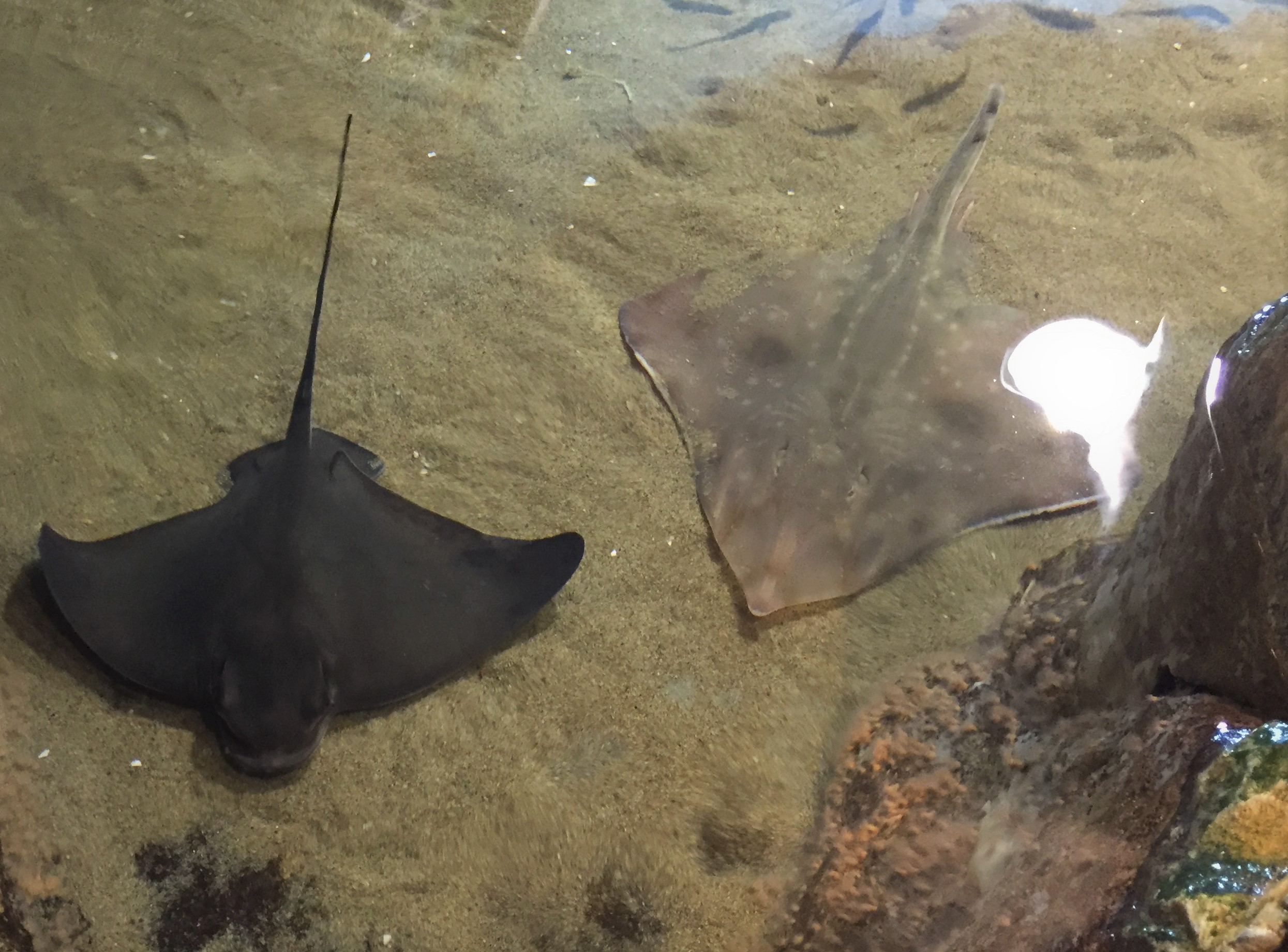
A bat ray (Myliobatis californica) and a big skate (Beringraja binoculata)

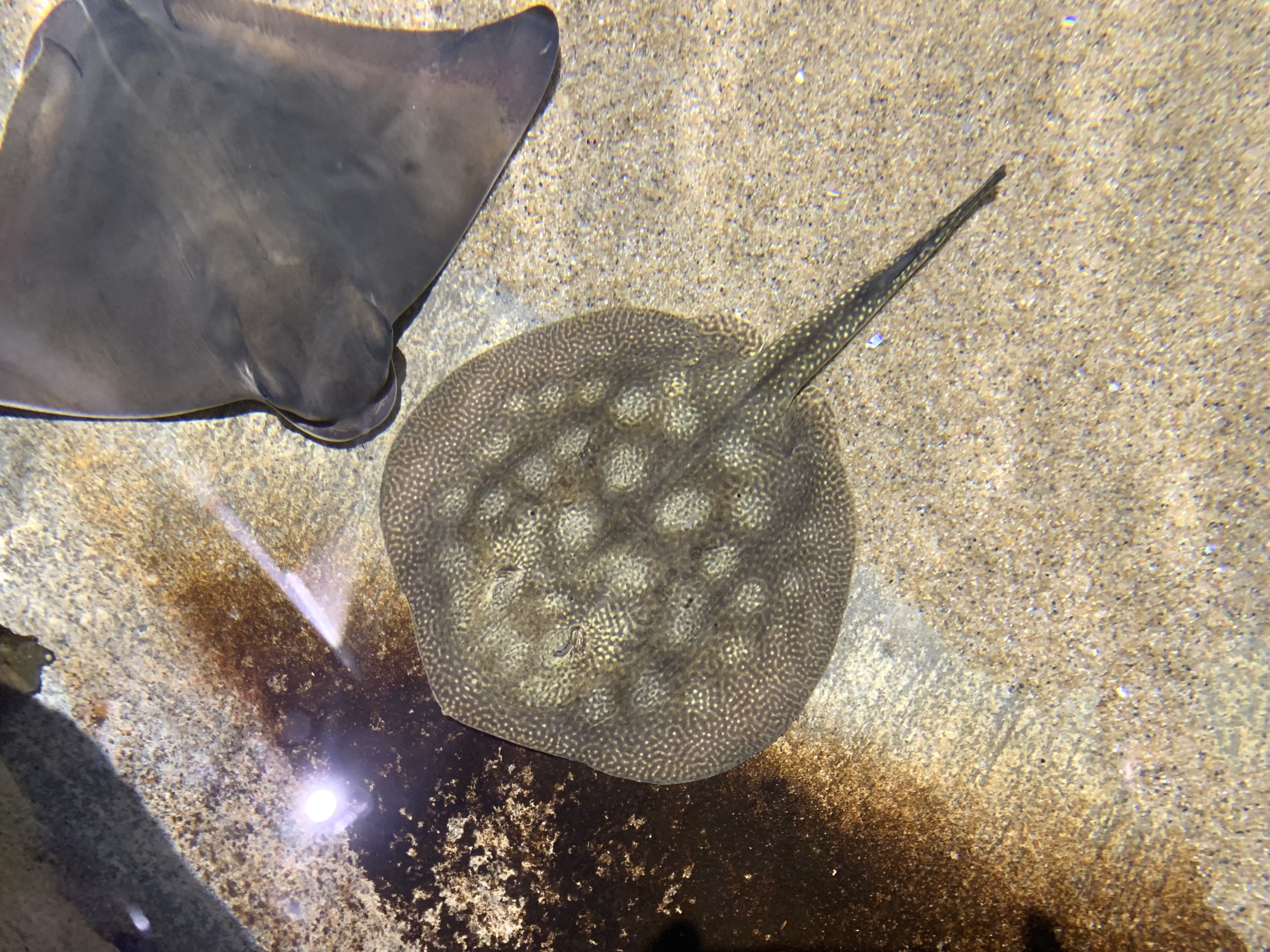
A round stingray (Urobatis halleri)

=== North American river otters ===
North American river otters are the most playful residents in the aquarium. Watch them swim, romp, and wrestle. Experience the otter feeding and learn about their barrier free training.

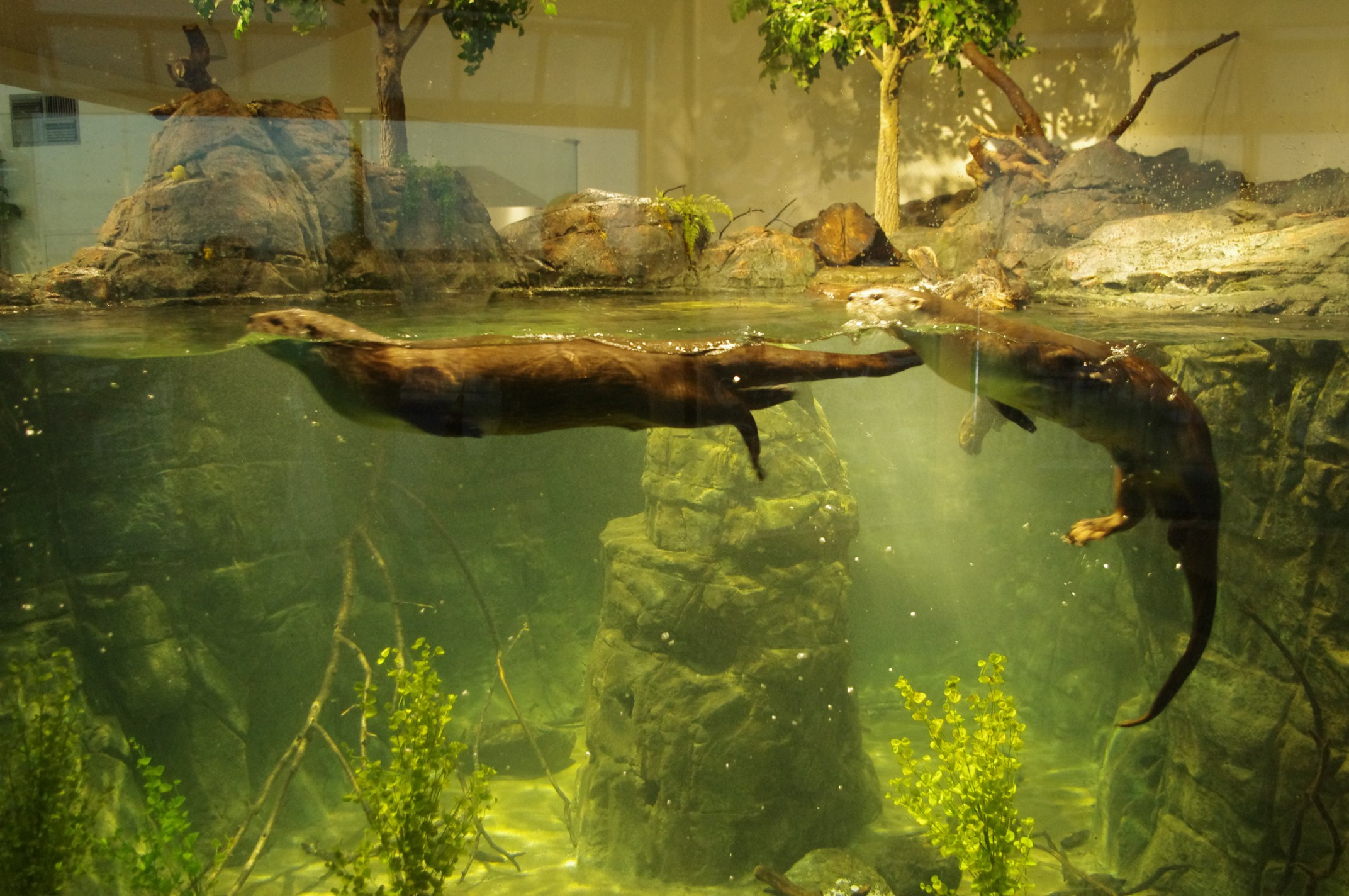
North American river otter (Lontra canadensis)

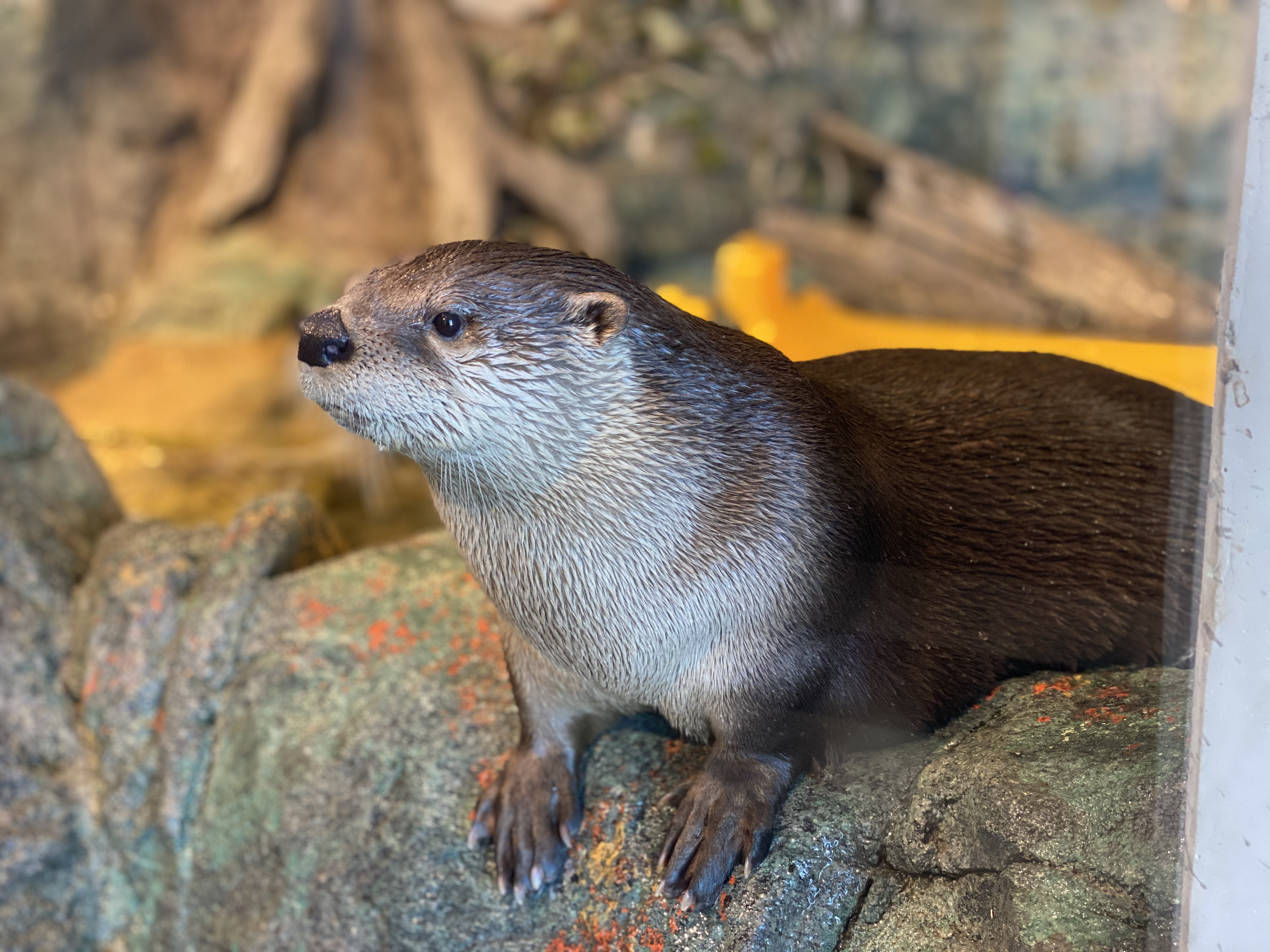
Shasta

== Animals ==
=== Sea Lions in San Francisco ===
Along the Embarcadero and other spots around San Francisco, hand-painted, life-size sea lion statues made of carbon fiber can be found. These were made as part of a celebration of the 30 years since sea lions started appearing on docks near Pier 39. After the Loma Prieta earthquake hit San Francisco, the lions started to bask in the sun on the K-dock on their pier. Since then, they have made a permanent home of the docks. Aquarium of the Bay commissioned 30 local artists to paint unique carbon fiber sea lions in Sausalito before taking them out and placing them in various locations around San Francisco for people to find as an homage to the now long-time residents.

=== Sharks ===
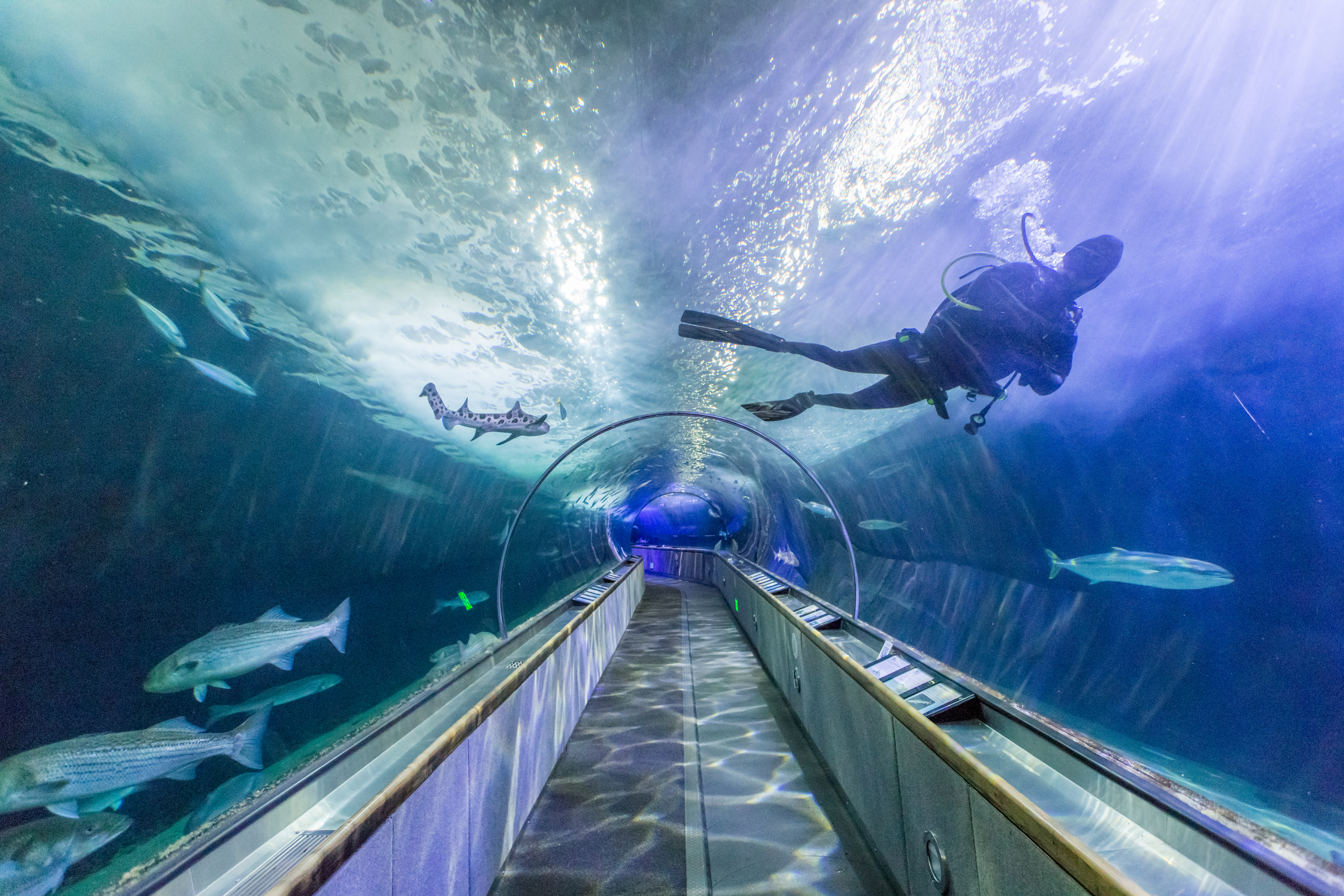
A diver above the Sharks of Alcatraz Tunnel.

Aquarium of the Bay is the first institute in the United States to successfully breed healthy Pacific Angel Sharks. Aquarium biologists have published several papers and hosted numerous conferences on best practices for taking care of this specific breed.

The aquarium has over 50 sharks from species such as:

- Broadnose sevengill shark (Notorynchus cepedianus), including a 10-foot (3.0 m) long female caught in 2010
  - The Aquarium is currently conducting research to assess population status of the Broadnose Sevengill breed in the San Francisco Bay with the help of other institutions.
- Leopard shark (Triakis semifasciata)
- Soupfin (Galeorhinus galeus)
- Swell shark (Cephaloscyllium ventriosum)

The aquarium also has skates, bat rays and thousands of other animals including eels, flatfish, rockfish, wrasse, gobies, kelpfish, pricklebacks, sculpin and sturgeons.

A river otter exhibit opened on June 28, 2013. Snow is placed in the otter enclosure periodically during the winter during what are called "Otter Snow Days".

=== Moon Jellies ===
Aquarium of the Bay's moon jellies have all been born and raised on site. The program has been running since 1998.
