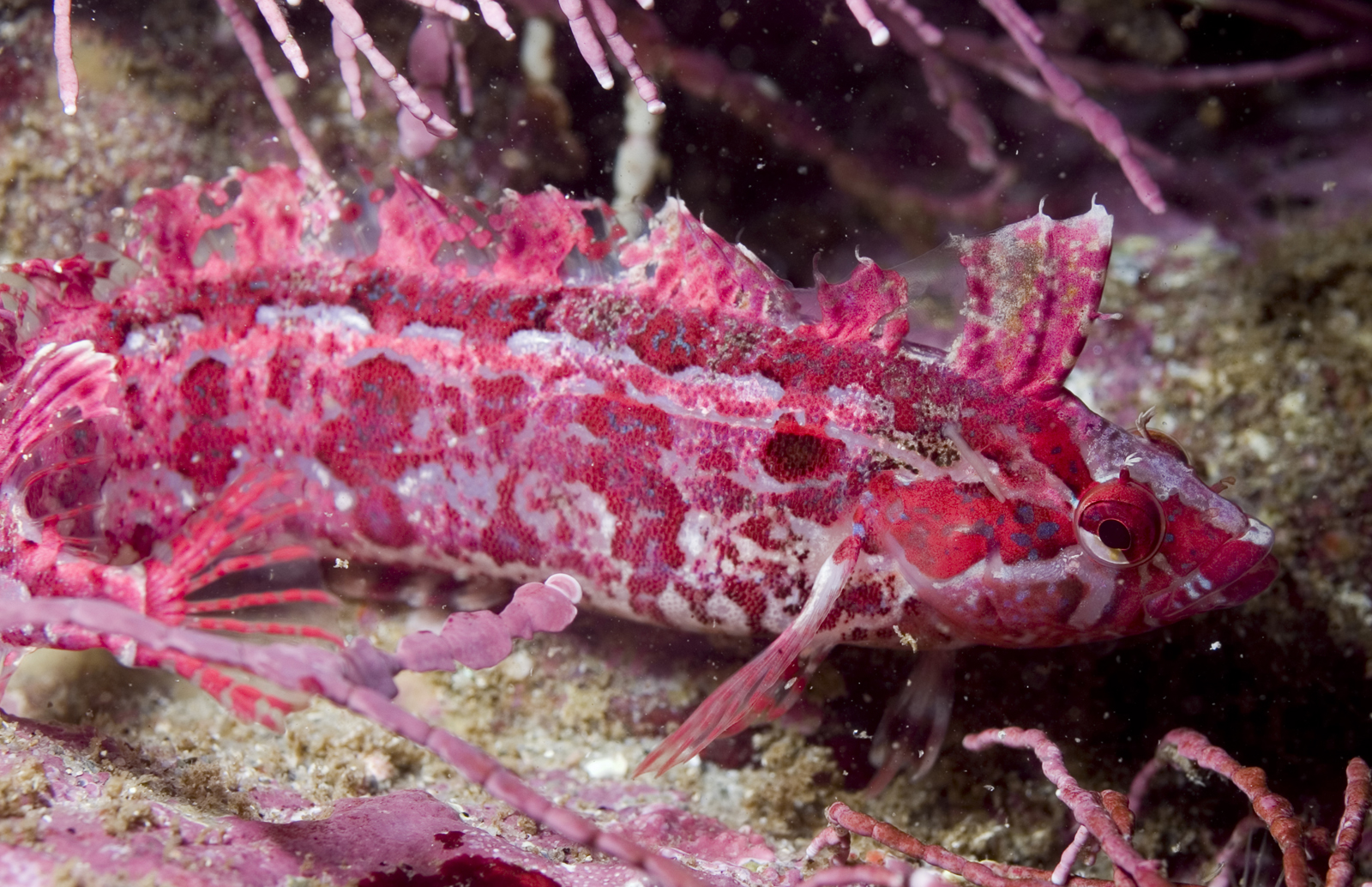
- Gibbonsia sp.

Scientific classification
- Kingdom: Animalia
- Phylum: Chordata
- Class: Actinopterygii
- Order: Blenniiformes
- Family: Clinidae
- Genus: Gibbonsia; J. G. Cooper, 1864

Type species
- Myxodes elegans J. G. Cooper, 1864

= Gibbonsia =

Genus of fishes

Gibbonsia is a genus of clinids native to the eastern Pacific ocean. The name of this genus honours the American naturalist, physician and founder member of the California Academy of Sciences, William P. Gibbons (1812–1897).

== Species ==
There are currently three recognized species in this genus:

- Gibbonsia elegans (J. G. Cooper, 1864) (Spotted kelpfish)
- Gibbonsia metzi C. L. Hubbs, 1927 (Striped kelpfish)
- Gibbonsia montereyensis C. L. Hubbs, 1927 (Crevice kelpfish)
