= The Bay Institute =

Environmental nonprofit organization in California

The Bay Institute (TBI) is a nonprofit research, education, and advocacy organization dedicated to protecting and restoring the ecosystem of the San Francisco Bay, the Sacramento-San Joaquin Delta, and the estuary's tributary rivers, streams, and watersheds. Created in 1981, TBI's scientific experts have worked to secure stronger protections for endangered species and their habitats; improve water quality; reform how California manages its water resources; and promote comprehensive ecological restoration from the Sierra to the sea.

The Bay Institute is a part of the nonprofit Bay Ecotarium, which also includes the Aquarium of the Bay in San Francisco.

The institute's major programs cover the Coast and Ocean, Rivers and the Delta, and San Francisco Bay Restoration.
