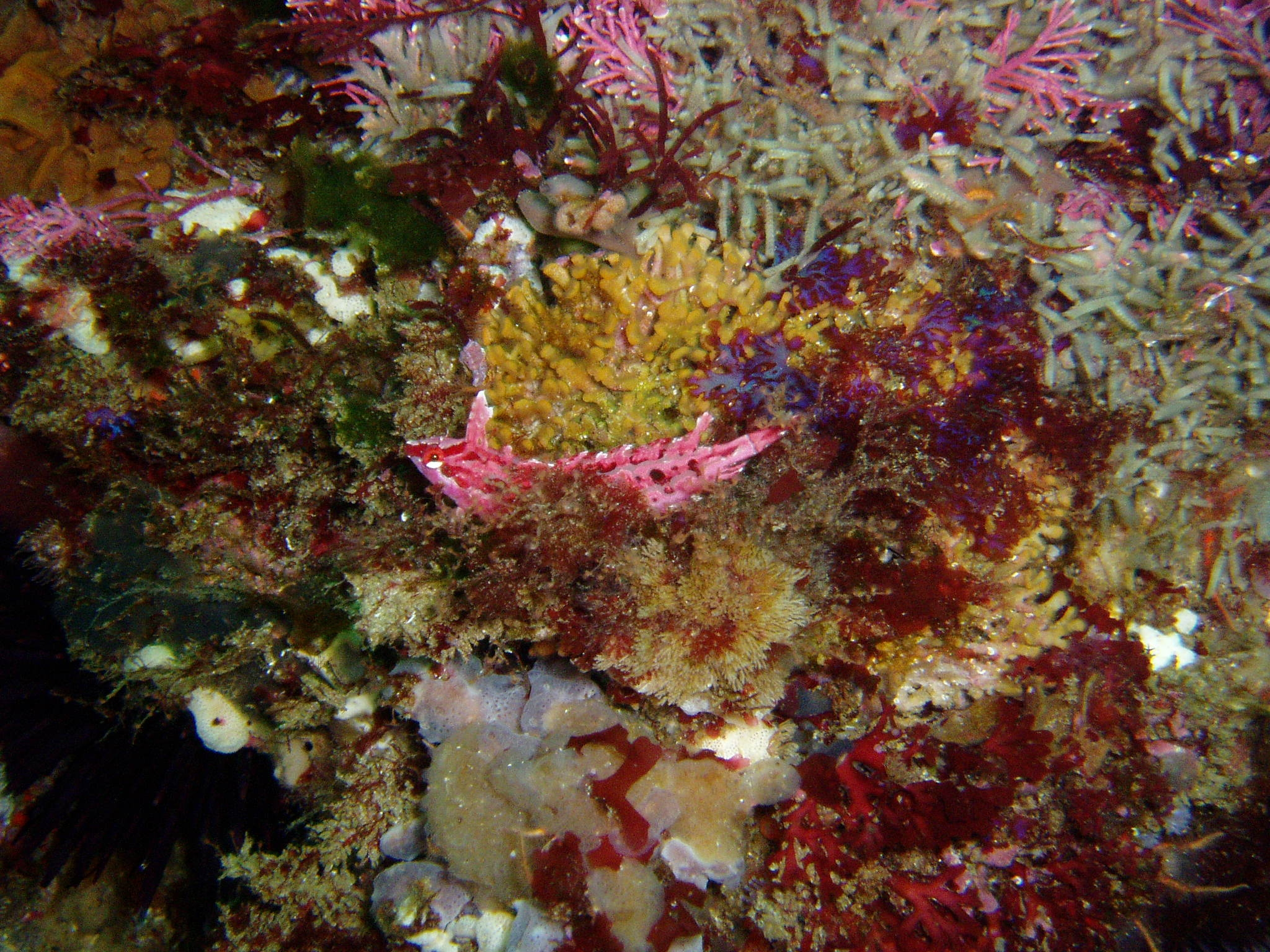
- At Channel Islands NMS, California.

Conservation status
- Least Concern (IUCN 3.1)

Scientific classification
- Kingdom: Animalia
- Phylum: Chordata
- Class: Actinopterygii
- Division: Teleostei
- Order: Blenniiformes
- Family: Clinidae
- Genus: Gibbonsia
- Species: G. montereyensis

Binomial name
- Gibbonsia montereyensis C. L. Hubbs, 1927

Synonyms
- Gibbonsia elegans montereyensis C. L. Hubbs, 1927; Gibbonsia erythra C. Hubbs, 1952

= Gibbonsia montereyensis =

Species of fish

Gibbonsia montereyensis, commonly known as the crevice kelpfish, is a species of blenny. It is found in coastal waters from British Columbia to Baja California. This species inhabits rocky, algae-covered areas on exposed coasts, particularly where seagrass and algal growth are abundant. G. montereyensis often exhibits coloration that matches its environment.

== Description ==
Gibbonsia monteryensis is a small marine fish with a maximum length of about 11 cm (4.3 in), the smallest member of its genus. It has an elongated, laterally compressed body with relatively small pelvic and caudal fins. Its body is covered with small cycloid scales. The crevice kelpfish has a continuous dorsal fin, extending from the head to the caudal peduncle. Along its dorsal fin it has 34-36 spines and 5-8 rays. The dorsal spines on its head are relatively long compared to its other spines which gives it the appearance of having a sort of crest on its head. Like other kelpfish, G. montereyenesis has fleshy, hairlike tufts above its eyes called cirri. Its anal fin is elongated consisting of 34-36 spines and 5-8 rays. It has pelvic fin spines that are separate from the main pelvic fin and sit slightly in front of the main fin. Its mouth is small and terminal. The crevice kelpfish has small, fixed, conical teeth. One of the few distinguishing features of G. montereyensis that differentiates it from other Gibbonsia species is that it lacks scales on its caudal fin. Color variability is high in the crevice kelpfish and can include brown, reddish, green dark, and silver. The typical pattern of G. montereyensis is dark vertical bars running down the length of the body, scattered dark spots, and a dark ocellus above the lateral line and behind the pectoral fin. Gibbonsia as a genus are sexually dichromatic, differing in belly color between males and females. The crevice kelpfish is capable of changing colors but there are no definitive studies on the timing and mechanism that allows it to change colors. Similar species such as G. elegans have been seen to be capable of changing their colors over the course of several weeks, likely independent of diet. Their color often varies by season as they are often red in winter when red algae dominates and green in the spring when green algae dominates. G. montereyensis is also susceptible to chromotaforma which is a tumor of pigment cells that develops in its cutaneous layer.

== Distribution ==
Gibbonsia montereyensis range extends along the coastal Eastern Pacific from British Columbia to Central Baja California. South of Point Conception, the crevice kelpfish is only found on offshore islands and parts of Baja California where upwelling keeps the water colder. It is only occasionally found in tidepools as it prefers deeper waters compared to other Gibbonsia species. It typically inhabits the intertidal zone to subtidal zone at depths up to 20 m (66 ft).

== Ecology ==
The crevice kelpfish spends much of its time anchored onto algae covered rocks using its pectoral spines where it can successfully camouflage using its coloration to camouflage with the algae. It does not have high mobility, and it is a common prey for larger marine predators making its camouflage an important defense. G. montereyensis is a benthic, invertebrate feeder and its diet consists of isopods, amphipods, crabs, copepods, shrimps, limpets, mollusks, fish eggs and polychaetes.

== Conservation status ==
Gibbonsia montereyensis is listed as a species of Least Concern by the IUCN. However, the crevice kelpfish will likely be affected by warming ocean temperatures as it prefers colder water. It has some tolerance to warmer waters, but not as much as other Gibbonsia species. It is less adaptable to cold and warmer water than Gibbonsia metzi. Heat stress can cause it to die very quickly if the water temperature reaches a level outside of its tolerable range. A new type of parasitic copepod may affect it as it has been found on two other species of Gibbonsia, but it has not been found on G. monteyensis yet.
