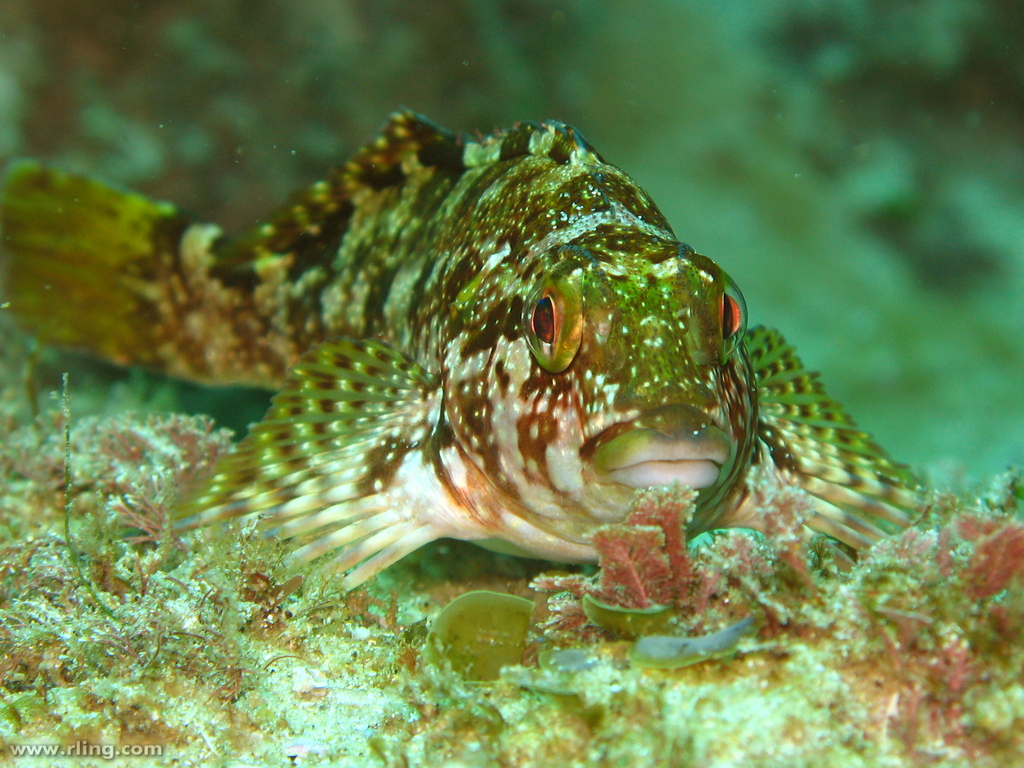

Scientific classification
- Kingdom: Animalia
- Phylum: Chordata
- Class: Actinopterygii
- Order: Centrarchiformes
- Family: Chironemidae
- Genus: Chironemus
- Species: C. marmoratus

Binomial name
- Chironemus marmoratus Günther, 1860

= Large kelpfish =

Species of fish

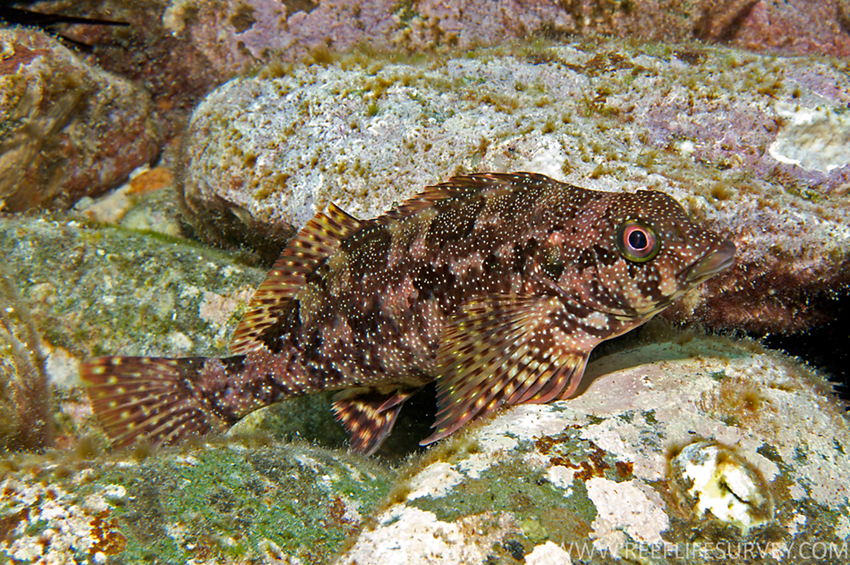
South of Eden, New South Wales

The large kelpfish (Chironemus marmoratus), the Eastern kelpfish, hiwihiwi, surgefish or kelpfish, is a species of marine ray-finned fish, a kelpfish belonging to the family Chironemidae. It is found in southern Australia, and off the North Island of New Zealand, at depths down to 30 m.

== Taxonomy ==
The large kelpfish was first formally described in 1860 by the German born British ichthyologist Albert Günther with the type locality given as the Swan River and Erub on the western coast of Australia, an error, this is outside of the known range of this species. The specific name marmoratus means "marbled" a reference to the pattern of colouration on this fish's body. C. marmoratus is a part of the infra class Teleostei, which are the modern ray-finned fishes. This is an incredibly diverse subclass in the larger class Actinopterygii. These fish are termed "ray-finned fish" due to their flexible rays. Rays are transparent, flexible fins on the sides, top, and bottom of a fish. These are adaptations used for hydrodynamics and maneuverability in the water.

== Description ==
The large kelpfish has a pointed snout and a small mouth. There are 14-15 spines and 16-20 soft rays in the dorsal fin while the anal fin contains 3 spines and 6-8 soft rays. The maximum standard length recorded is 40 cm (16 in). It has large pectoral fins with the upper rays being branched and the lower ones being unbranched and robust. The colour of the body can be grey, brown, green or pinkish and the head and body are covered in small white spots, with the body having large dark blotches.

== Distribution and habitat ==
The large kelpfish is found in the southwestern Pacific Ocean. It occurs in Australia from Fraser Island in Queensland to the Gippsland Lakes in Victoria, the islands in the Bass Strait and north-eastern Tasmania, as well as Lord Howe Island in the Tasman Sea. In New Zealand it is found around the North Island, between the North Cape and East Cape. This species is found in kelp and areas with macroalgae on reefs in shallow water in area that are frequently subjected to powerful surges or waves, often being found in the intertidal zone or around 10 meters depth. In Northeast New Zealand, C. marmoratus is commonly found in barren habitats with other fish like Girella tricuspidata and Parma alboscapularis. It is also sometimes found in shallow breakwater areas over winter. C. marmoratus is one of only a few species to have a trans-Tasman distribution in one Australian study. This is surprising because the islands of New Zealand were historically connected to Australia through the Gondwana landmass.

== Biology ==
The large kelpfish feeds on invertebrates, including small molluscs, crabs and sea urchins. The fertilised eggs are reportedly attached to fronds of seaweed within cavities in reefs. These fishes remain close to the seabed and continually move around the surge zone and may be found in large aggregations. C. marmoratus is considered a site-attached predator and is a relatively poor swimmer. It has been known to rest along the bottom and will jump between habitats rather than continuously swim. In another study from New Zealand, C. marmoratus, though able to swim against the current, refused to do so. The fish instead used its pectoral fins and hydrodynamics to hold itself in place along the bottom without swimming. The large kelpfish is also considered crepuscular, meaning it is most active during the twilight period of the day.

== Conservation status ==
The C. marmoratus populations are generally stable but do depend on the health of their habitat, the kelp forests. Factors like pollution, climate change, overfishing, and coastal development can all pose a risk to the kelp forest ecosystem and ultimately the large kelpfish. A study from Australia analyzing the amount of plastic in reef fish found that while most reef fish had no plastic in their guts, out of five C. marmoratus fish, one had plastic in its gut. The large kelpfish have decreased in abundance in the past, according to one 1990 study in New Zealand. In this study, the large kelpfish abundance in the rocky reef decreased from 1978 to 1988.
