= Spiracanthus =

Scientific classification
- Kingdom: Animalia
- Phylum: Acanthocephala
- Class: Palaeacanthocephala
- Order: Echinorhynchida
- Family: Arhythmacanthidae
- Genus: Spiracanthus; Munoz & George-Nascimento, 2002
- Species: S. bovichthys

Binomial name
- Spiracanthus bovichthys Munoz & George-Nascimento, 2002

Genus of parasitic worms

Spiracanthus is a monotypic genus of acanthocephalans (thorny-headed or spiny-headed parasitic worms) containing a single species, Spiracanthus bovichthys, that infests animals.

== Taxonomy ==
The species was described by Munoz & George-Nascimento in 2002. The National Center for Biotechnology Information does not indicate that any phylogenetic analysis has been published on Spiracanthus that would confirm its position as a unique genus in the family Arhythmacanthidae.

== Description ==
Spiracanthus bovichthys consists of a proboscis covered in hooks and a long trunk.

== Distribution ==
The distribution of Spiracanthus bovichthys is determined by that of its hosts, which are found in the central south coast of Chile.

== Hosts ==
Life cycle of Acanthocephala. (Note: There are no known aberrant human infections for S. bovichthys species.)

The life cycle of an acanthocephalan consists of three stages beginning when an infective acanthor (development of an egg) is released from the intestines of the definitive host and then ingested by an arthropod, the intermediate host. Although the intermediate hosts of Spiracanthus are ???. When the acanthor molts, the second stage called the acanthella begins. This stage involves penetrating the wall of the mesenteron or the intestine of the intermediate host and growing. The final stage is the infective cystacanth which is the larval or juvenile state of an Acanthocephalan, differing from the adult only in size and stage of sexual development. The cystacanths within the intermediate hosts are consumed by the definitive host, usually attaching to the walls of the intestines, and as adults they reproduce sexually in the intestines. The acanthor is passed in the feces of the definitive host and the cycle repeats. There may be paratenic hosts (hosts where parasites infest but do not undergo larval development or sexual reproduction) for Spiracanthus.

Spiracanthus bovichthys parasitizes fish. The most suitable host is Bovichthys chilensis which was the only fish found infested with adult females. Other hosts include Auchenionchus variolosus, Calliclinus genigutattus, Sindoscopus australis, Myxodes cristatus, and Gobiesox marmoratus. There are no reported cases of S. bovichthys infesting humans in the English language medical literature.

Hosts for Spiracanthus bovichthys

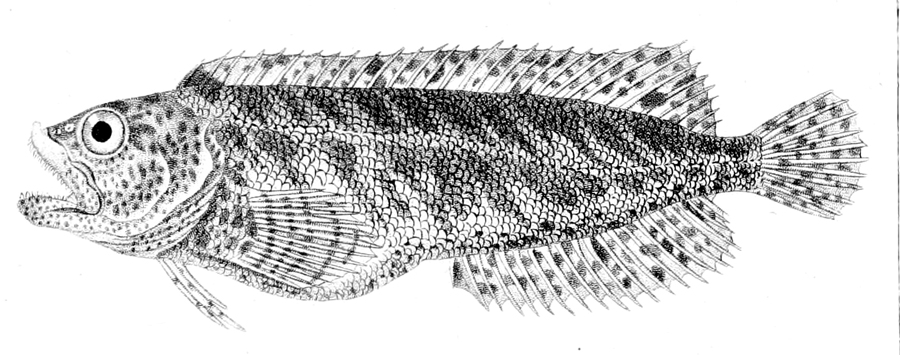
