= Cancelloxus burrelli =

Conservation status
- Least Concern (IUCN 3.1)

Scientific classification
- Kingdom: Animalia
- Phylum: Chordata
- Class: Actinopterygii
- Order: Blenniiformes
- Family: Clinidae
- Genus: Cancelloxus
- Species: C. burrelli

Binomial name
- Cancelloxus burrelli J. L. B. Smith, 1961

Species of fish

Cancelloxus burrelli, the slender platanna-klipfish, is a species of clinid found in subtropical waters of the Atlantic Ocean along the South African coast from the Orange River to Algoa Bay in South Africa. It can be found from the intertidal zone down to about 20 metres (66 ft). This species can reach a maximum length of 12 centimetres (4.7 in) TL.

== Description ==
- Fins: Dorsal fin spines 38 to 39, rays 10 to 14; Anal fin spines 2, rays 38 to 43; Pectoral fin rays 13 to 15; Ventral fin spines 1, rays 3.
- Gill rakers (0 to 2)+(5 to 9).
- Vertebrae: Females (20 to 21)+(44 to 45), Males 19+(43 to 46).
- Lateral line with 69 to 71 single pores in front.
- Body depth 8 to 11 in Standard length.
- Head length 4.25 to 5.5 in Standard length.
- Eye 3.75 to 4.75 diameters in head length.
- Caudal peduncle 23.5 to 31% head length, depth 20 to 28.5% head length.

Shape:

A small, slender fish with an elongate and compressed body, and a depressed head with a pointed snout. The tip of the lower jaw is angled downwards and extends beyond the upper jaw. There are no tentacles or papillae over the eyes. The front nostrils are tubular and the cirri are small simple flaps. The dorsal fin is low and of even height, without a crest.

Colour:

The ground colour is a semi-translucent cream. There is a broken bright silver-white mid-lateral stripe with eleven or twelve distinct, irregular, coppery olive to dark brown saddles with darker edges above it and an olive stripe from the eye to the back edge of the opercle Smaller white and dark patches may occur along the flanks. Lips and underparts cream. Pectoral base silver. Fins have a glassy appearance, except for shading of the saddles extending up the dorsal fin. A Y-shaped set of lines runs through the eye, with the single line from the mouth, and a narrow line straight across the head joining the eyes. Pupils jet black, iris narrow and golden. the rest of the eye is whitish with darker areas where the line crosses the eye. The front section of the fish is opaque, and the rest slightly translucent, especially in juveniles which still lack the broken white stripe.

Size:

Attains 12 cm.

== Distribution ==
South African West Coast, from the Orange River mouth southwards to the south coast round to Algoa Bay. Off the Cape Peninsula it is most commonly found at Ouderkaal, but also at Bantry Bay and other places where the right sand is common.

== Habitat ==
Lives in coarse large-grained sandy environments with wave-formed sand ridges from the lowest part of intertidal zone, down to at least 20 m. Juveniles can be found in finer sand, and can be mistaken for Cancelloxus longior which inhabits similar areas.

Behaviour:

The fish lies just below the surface of the sand, and can sometimes be seen with the head sticking out. When disturbed it will dash over a few ridges, or along one, and swim straight into a ridge. This may result in the fish reappearing on the other side of the ridge, sometimes with the tail still sticking out on the entry side, or the fish may disappear from view, and can dig itself quite deeply into the sand.

== Etymology ==
Burrelli: named after Cyril J. Burrell, "who has constantly provided valuable aid in my researches."
