= Pavoclinus myae =

Conservation status
- Least Concern (IUCN 3.1)

Scientific classification
- Kingdom: Animalia
- Phylum: Chordata
- Class: Actinopterygii
- Order: Blenniiformes
- Family: Clinidae
- Genus: Pavoclinus
- Species: P. myae

Binomial name
- Pavoclinus myae Christensen, 1978

Species of fish

Pavoclinus myae, or Mya's klipfish, is a species of clinid fish found from East London to Algoa Bay along the coast of South Africa. The specific name honors the primary author's then fiancée, Mya van Harten.

== Description ==
Mya's klipfish is rusty brown with a number of vertical maroon bars along its body and a silver spot behind each one of its eyes. There are several smaller spots on the preopercule and abdomen, and reddish bar near the eye radiate downward near the ventre.

== Distribution and habitat ==
Mya's klipfish can be located in the subtidal zone from near the surface to about 3 metres (9.8 ft). Individuals can grow to a maximum length of 5 centimetres (2.0 in) TL. This species feeds primarily on aquatic arthropods such as amphipods, isopods and tanaids.

Mya's kilpfish is only known from the southeastern portion of the Atlantic Ocean, especially from the coastal waters of South Africa, from East London, north to Algoa Bay.
