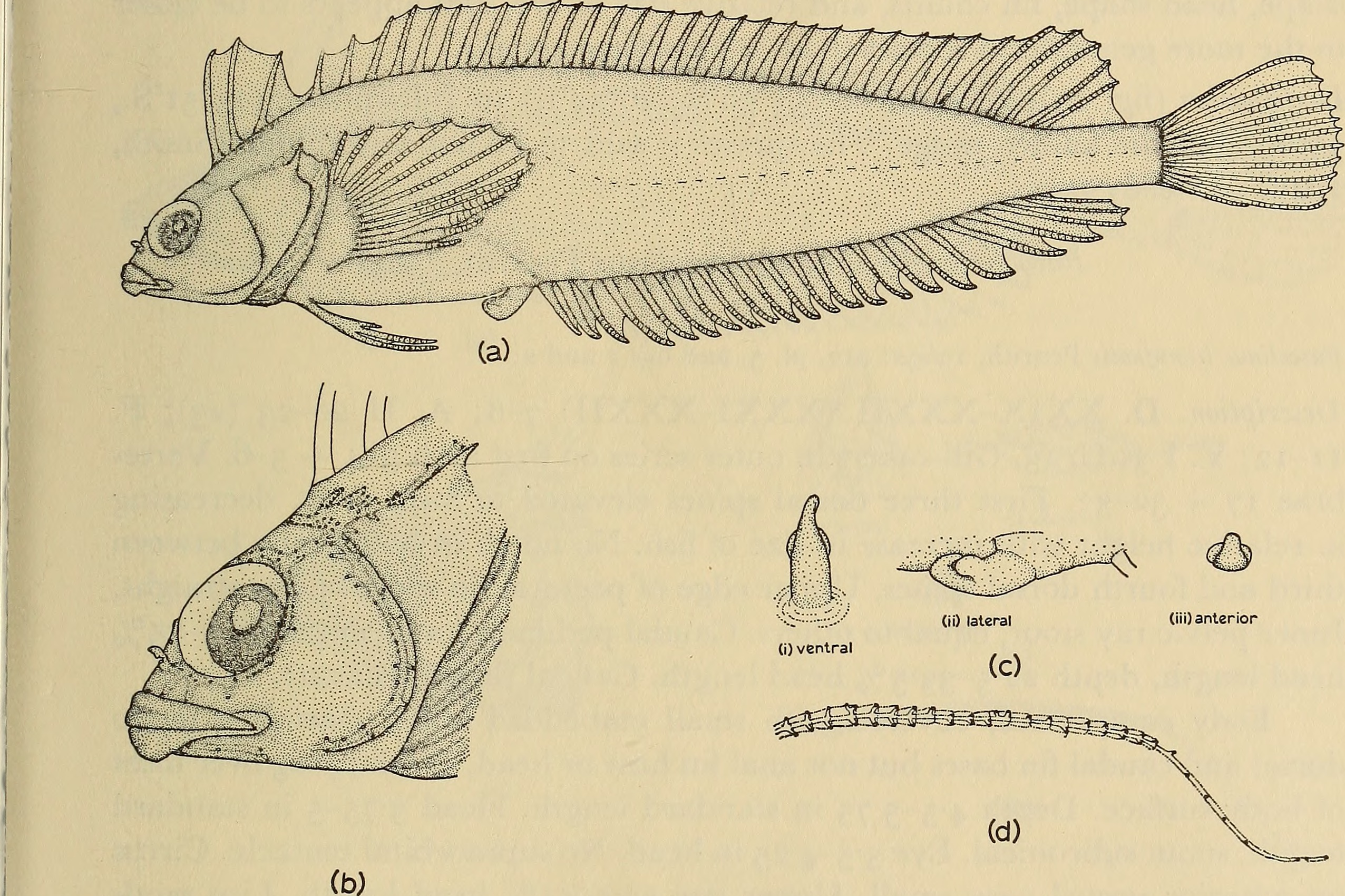

Conservation status
- Least Concern (IUCN 3.1)

Scientific classification
- Kingdom: Animalia
- Phylum: Chordata
- Class: Actinopterygii
- Order: Blenniiformes
- Family: Clinidae
- Genus: Pavoclinus
- Species: P. laurentii

Binomial name
- Pavoclinus laurentii (Gilchrist & W. W. Thompson, 1908)

Synonyms
- Clinus laurentii Gilchrist & W. W. Thompson, 1908; Labroclinus laurentii (Gilchrist & W. W. Thompson, 1908)

= Pavoclinus laurentii =

Species of fish

Pavoclinus laurentii, the rippled klipfish, is a species of clinid found from Inhambane, Mozambique to Port Alfred, South Africa where it prefers weed-grown tide pools. It can reach a maximum length of 13 centimetres (5.1 in) TL. The specific name honours Master Lawrence Robinson, who caught type specimens at Winklespruit, the use of the term master indicates that he was probably younger than 12 years old at the time.
