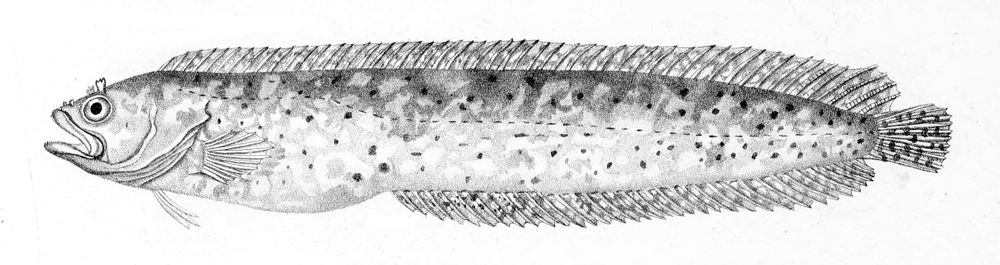

Conservation status
- Least Concern (IUCN 3.1)

Scientific classification
- Kingdom: Animalia
- Phylum: Chordata
- Class: Actinopterygii
- Order: Blenniiformes
- Family: Clinidae
- Genus: Blennophis
- Species: B. anguillaris

Binomial name
- Blennophis anguillaris (Valenciennes, 1836)

Synonyms
- Clinus anguillaris Valenciennes, 1836; Blennius rubescens M. H. C. Lichtenstein, 1823 (ambiguous); Blennophis rubescens (M. H. C. Lichtenstein, 1823) (ambiguous)

= Blennophis anguillaris =

Species of fish

Blennophis anguillaris, the snaky klipfish, is a species of clinid found in the subtropical waters of the Atlantic Ocean around South Africa. It can be found in the subtidal zone and also is a denizen of tidepools. This species can reach a maximum length of 30 centimetres (12 in) TL.

== Description ==
- Fins: Dorsal fin spines 44 to 50, rays 2 to 4; Anal fin spines 2, rays 33 to 37; Pectoral fin rays 13 to 14; Ventral fin spines 1, rays 3.
- Gill rakers (2 to 3)+(5 to 7).
- Vertebrae 18+(38 to 40).
- Lateral line with about 20 to 22 vertical pairs of pores in front.
- Body depth 6 to 7.75 in Standard length.
- Head length 4.75 to 5.75 in Standard length.
- Eye 3.25 to 5 diameters in head length.
- Caudal peduncle 15.5 to 25% head length, depth 28.5 to 35.5% head length.

Shape:

Head slightly depressed and rounded, blunt snout of moderate length with a prominent tentacle above each eye consisting of a short flat stalk, sometimes bifurcated, palmated and fringed; interorbital space convex; mouth slightly oblique; upper and lower jaws of similar length. Lips thick. Body elongate robust and straight. Caudal peduncle very short. The dorsal fin is low and even, without a crest, and there are no clusters of cirri on the dorsal spine tips. Cirri on the front nostrils are elongated with serrated edges, and unbranched.

Colour:

Colour is generally uniform, in shades of yellow, yellowish green, brown, dull crimson, red or pink, mottled with darker blotches, spots, and occasionally bars; often with a row of bright oblong spots below the dorsal fin. Fins are red- or white-tipped. Sometimes there is a light edged, dark ocellus on the shoulder, and often two dark radiating bars from the eye across the cheek. The snout is white in large, dark-red specimens. They may be brown or red with a large black blotch between the 1st 3 dorsal spines and numerous black dots round eye and on body. The colour of the eyes matches the colour of the body, with feint radiating bars. The pupil is dark, with a narrow reddish-orange iris.

The young are eel-like, usually almost black, with the margins of dorsal, anal and caudal fins red, but red ones have a distinct white snout. An ocellus is generally present in juveniles. Very small juveniles usually plain purple-black with white caudal fin.

Size:

Attains 30 cm.

== Distribution ==
From Lüderitzbucht to East London. From the Cape Peninsula they have been recorded from tidal pools in Sea Point, the wreck of the SS Clan Stuart, Froggy Pond and A-Frame in Simon's Town, to about 6m depth.

== Habitat ==
The species, which is the most eel-like of the genus, is fairly plentiful, and is usually found in fairly secluded holes or rock-pools near the low tide mark, under stones at low water mark, and among kelp stipes. Subtidally they are more common in the kelp of the west coast especially north of Lamberts Bay. Juvenile specimens have been found in rock pools, often in very shallow water, but at the low water mark. Large specimens are seen mostly at night at a depth of about 6 to 8m. Behaviour is skittish and the fish will disappear quickly. As they are often seen in the same habitat, large specimens are easy to confuse with Barbelled klipfish (Cirrhibarbis capensis) as their colouration is often similar and the fish tends to hide most of its body, particularly the head. Generally a view of the head will resolve identification.

== Etymology ==
Anguillaris: from anguilla; eel, referring to the overall body shape.
