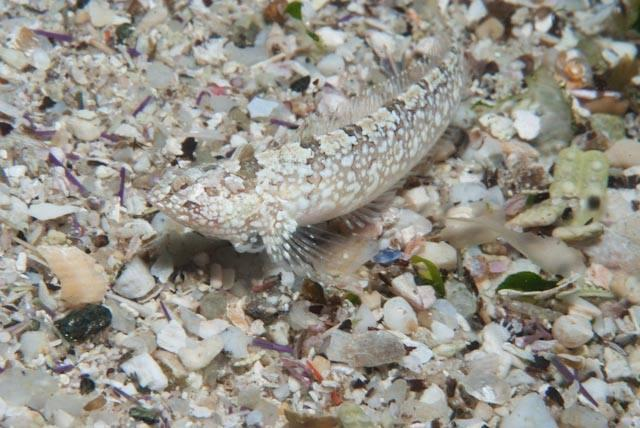

Conservation status
- Least Concern (IUCN 3.1)

Scientific classification
- Kingdom: Animalia
- Phylum: Chordata
- Class: Actinopterygii
- Order: Blenniiformes
- Family: Clinidae
- Genus: Xenopoclinus
- Species: X. kochi

Binomial name
- Xenopoclinus kochi J. L. B. Smith, 1948

= Xenopoclinus kochi =

Species of fish

Xenopoclinus kochi, the Platanna klipfish, is a species of clinid found along the coast of South Africa, where it occurs on sandy substrates in the intertidal zone near to kelp beds at depths of from 0 to 20 m (0 to 66 ft). It can reach a maximum total length of 10 cm (3.9 in). The specific name honours the malacologist H. J. Koch, who collected the type while conducting conchological fieldwork,
