= Cancelloxus elongatus =

Conservation status
- Least Concern (IUCN 3.1)

Scientific classification
- Kingdom: Animalia
- Phylum: Chordata
- Class: Actinopterygii
- Order: Blenniiformes
- Family: Clinidae
- Genus: Cancelloxus
- Species: C. elongatus

Binomial name
- Cancelloxus elongatus Heemstra & J. E. Wright, 1986

Species of fish

Cancelloxus elongatus, the whiteblotched klipfish, is a species of clinid found in subtropical waters of the Atlantic Ocean along the South African coast. It prefers sandy habitats with nearby rocks at depths of from 10 to 25 metres (33 to 82 ft). It can reach a maximum length of 5 centimetres (2.0 in) TL. This species preys primarily on zoobenthos.

== Description ==
- Fins: Dorsal fin spines 38 to 43, rays 3 to 4; Anal fin spines 2, rays 27 to 32; Pectoral fin rays 11 to 12; Ventral fin spines 1, rays 3.
- Gill rakers (1 to 2)+(5).
- Vertebrae (15 to 16)+(33 to 34).
- Lateral line with 7 tubed scales in front part and about 18 to 22 small shallow pits mid-laterally.
- Body depth 7.1 to 9.6 in Standard length.
- Head length 4.2 to 4.6 in Standard length.
- Eye 6.4 to 7.2 diameters in head length.
- Caudal peduncle 7 to 10% standard length.

Shape:

The body is elongate, with a pointed head and slightly projecting lower jaw. The dorsal and ventral profiles are straight. The eyes are small. The dorsal fin as low and of even height, with slender and flexible front spines, and the last 5 to 7 spines stiff and sharp. Dorsal fin origin is above the opercle. Pelvic fin rays extend about a third of their length beyond the membrane, with the last ray well developed and more than half the length of middle ray.

Colour:

Pale to white with two dark vertical bars which blends in with the substrate on which they live and burrow.

Size:

Attains 5 cm.

== Distribution ==
South African south coast from Storms River mouth to Algoa Bay.

== Habitat ==
Fragmented shell and sand substrate areas near rocks in 10-25m.

== Etymology ==
Elongatus: as in elongated, referring to the body shape.
