= Ophiclinus pectoralis =

Conservation status
- Least Concern (IUCN 3.1)

Scientific classification
- Kingdom: Animalia
- Phylum: Chordata
- Class: Actinopterygii
- Order: Blenniiformes
- Family: Clinidae
- Genus: Ophiclinus
- Species: O. pectoralis

Binomial name
- Ophiclinus pectoralis A. George & V. G. Springer, 1980

Species of fish

Ophiclinus pectoralis, the whiteblotch snakeblenny, is a species of clinid found in reefs around western Australia preferring weedy and sandy areas at depths of about 13 metres (43 ft). It can reach a maximum length of 6 centimetres (2.4 in) TL.
