= Ophiclinops hutchinsi =

Conservation status
- Least Concern (IUCN 3.1)

Scientific classification
- Kingdom: Animalia
- Phylum: Chordata
- Class: Actinopterygii
- Order: Blenniiformes
- Family: Clinidae
- Genus: Ophiclinops
- Species: O. hutchinsi

Binomial name
- Ophiclinops hutchinsi A. George & V. G. Springer, 1980

Species of fish

Ophiclinops hutchinsi, the Earspot snakeblenny, is a species of clinid native to reefs with seagrass or weed growth at depths of from 13 to 15 metres (43 to 49 ft) along the coast of south east Western Australia.

== Etymology ==
The specific epithet "hutchinsi" honours J. Barry Hutchins, whom the authors credit with collecting the type specimens for the species.

== Description ==
This species can reach a maximum length of 9.5 centimetres (3.7 in) TL. They are primarily a mottled brown in colouring.
