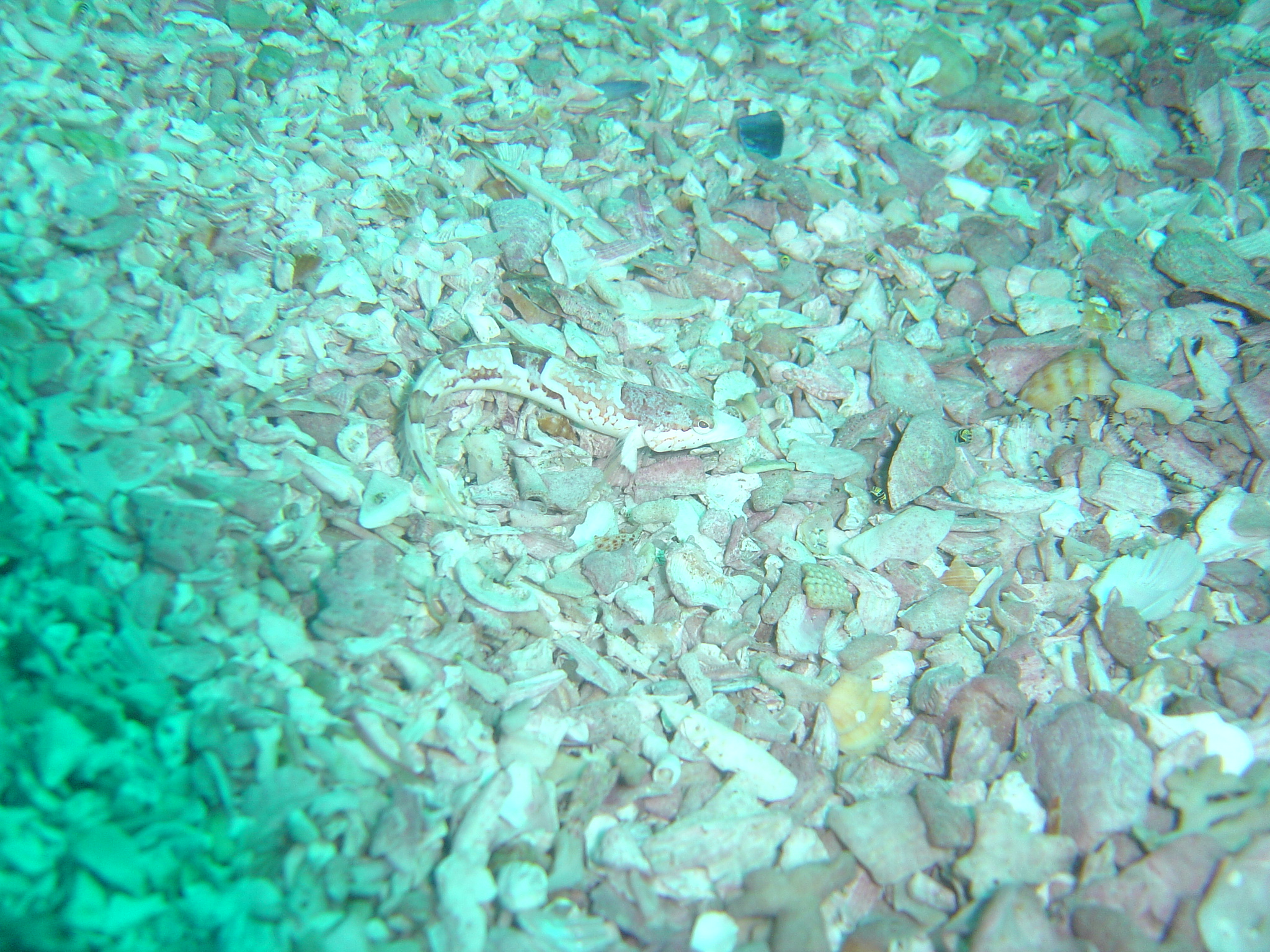

Conservation status
- Least Concern (IUCN 3.1)

Scientific classification
- Kingdom: Animalia
- Phylum: Chordata
- Class: Actinopterygii
- Order: Blenniiformes
- Family: Clinidae
- Genus: Pavoclinus
- Species: P. smalei

Binomial name
- Pavoclinus smalei Heemstra & J. E. Wright, 1986

= Pavoclinus smalei =

Species of fish

Pavoclinus smalei, the Deep-reef klipfish, is a species of clinid currently only known to exist near the mouth of the Storms River in South Africa where it was found over gravel substrates at depths of from 18 to 22 metres (59 to 72 ft). This species can reach a length of 5.5 centimetres (2.2 in) TL. The name honours the author Malcolm J. Smale.
