= Springeratus caledonicus =

Scientific classification
- Kingdom: Animalia
- Phylum: Chordata
- Class: Actinopterygii
- Order: Blenniiformes
- Family: Clinidae
- Genus: Springeratus
- Species: S. caledonicus

Binomial name
- Springeratus caledonicus (Sauvage, 1874)

Synonyms
- Lepidoblennius caledonicus Sauvage, 1874

Species of fish

Springeratus caledonicus, the Caledonian weedfish, is a species of clinid found around New Caledonia and Australia. This species placement in the family Clinidae has been questioned with some feeling that it is best placed in the family Microdesmidae.
