= Blennioclinus stella =

Conservation status
- Least Concern (IUCN 3.1)

Scientific classification
- Kingdom: Animalia
- Phylum: Chordata
- Class: Actinopterygii
- Order: Blenniiformes
- Family: Clinidae
- Genus: Blennioclinus
- Species: B. stella

Binomial name
- Blennioclinus stella J. L. B. Smith, 1946

Species of fish

Blennioclinus stella, the Silverbubble klipfish, is a species of clinid found in subtropical waters of the southeastern Atlantic and western Indian Ocean along the South African coast down to a depth of about 10 metres (33 ft). This species can reach a maximum length of 5 centimetres (2.0 in) TL.

== Description ==
- Fins: Dorsal fin spines 24 to 28, rays 6 to 7; Anal fin spines 2, rays 19 to 21; Pectoral fin rays 12; Ventral fin spines 1, rays 3.
- Gill rakers (1 to 2)+(4 to 6).
- Vertebrae 13+(25 to 27).
- Lateral line with about 20 to 25 vertical pairs of pores in front.
- Body depth 5.25 to 5.75 in Standard length.
- Head length 3.75 to 5.25 in Standard length.
- Eye 2.5 to 3.25 diameters in head length.
- Caudal peduncle 27.5 to 33% head length, depth 27.5 to 33.5% head length.

=== Shape ===
Head short, the anterior profile The front of the head between mouth and eyes is almost vertical but changes to nearly horizontal behind the eyes. There is a wider gap between the third and fourth dorsal fin spines than between the rest, with a deep notch forming a dorsal crest. The dorsal spines decrease in height towards the tail to form a deep notch between spiny and softer rayed portions of the dorsal fin. There are clusters of cirri at tips of the first three dorsal spines. The pectoral fins are rounded and the caudal peduncle short. No supraorbital tentacles are present. The cirri on the anterior nostrils are elongated, narrow at the base and expanded and deeply serrated at the tips.

=== Colour ===
Body colour variably brown, red and orange mottled, or greenish. Three narrow bars across the head and one through the eye to the cheek. Eight to ten vertical bars on the body, extending to the dorsal fin. Sometimes iridescent silvery patches along the sides. flanks.

=== Size ===
The smallest of the South African clinids, mature at 38mm, attains 50mm.

== Distribution ==
Subtidal and intertidal from Algoa Bay to north of Durban, not common in southern part of range, common subtidally down to 10m along the Transkei coast.

== Habitat ==
Not uncommon in tide pools at the bottom of the shore, among sand and pebbles and under rocks., but appears to be more common subtidally. Adept at concealment in crevices, also buries itself on its side in sand.
