= Pavoclinus litorafontis =

Conservation status
- Least Concern (IUCN 3.1)

Scientific classification
- Kingdom: Animalia
- Phylum: Chordata
- Class: Actinopterygii
- Order: Blenniiformes
- Family: Clinidae
- Genus: Pavoclinus
- Species: P. litorafontis

Binomial name
- Pavoclinus litorafontis M. L. Penrith, 1965

Species of fish

Pavoclinus litorafontis, the Slinky klipfish, is a species of clinid found around False Bay, South Africa, in the southeastern Atlantic ocean. It can reach a maximum length of 21 centimetres (8.3 in) TL. This species feeds primarily on amphipods in the genera Ischyrocerus and Laetmatophilus.
