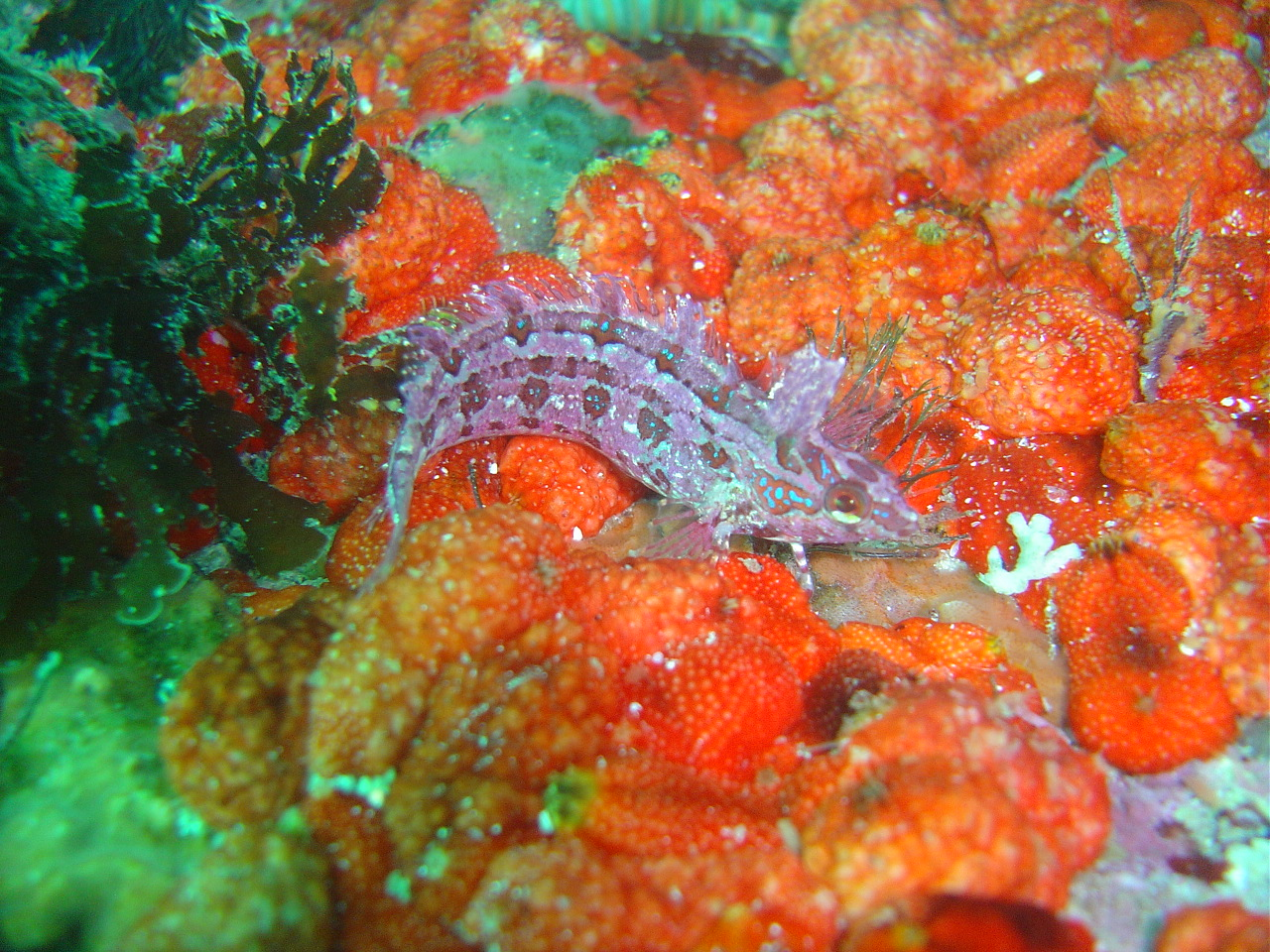

Conservation status
- Least Concern (IUCN 3.1)

Scientific classification
- Kingdom: Animalia
- Phylum: Chordata
- Class: Actinopterygii
- Order: Blenniiformes
- Family: Clinidae
- Genus: Pavoclinus
- Species: P. caeruleopunctatus

Binomial name
- Pavoclinus caeruleopunctatus Zsilavecz, 2001

= Pavoclinus caeruleopunctatus =

Species of fish

Pavoclinus caeruleopunctatus is a species of clinid native to the Atlantic coast of South Africa where it has been found at a depth of about 6 metres (20 ft).
