= Pavoclinus mentalis =

Conservation status
- Least Concern (IUCN 3.1)

Scientific classification
- Kingdom: Animalia
- Phylum: Chordata
- Class: Actinopterygii
- Order: Blenniiformes
- Family: Clinidae
- Genus: Pavoclinus
- Species: P. mentalis

Binomial name
- Pavoclinus mentalis (Gilchrist & W. W. Thompson, 1908)

Synonyms
- Cristiceps mentalis Gilchrist & W. W. Thompson, 1908; Labroclinus mentalis (Gilchrist & W. W. Thompson, 1908)

Species of fish

Pavoclinus mentalis, the Bearded klipfish, is a species of clinid found from Mozambique to Algoa Bay, South Africa where it occurs in weedy areas in the subtidal zone. It can reach a maximum length of 30 centimetres (12 in) TL.
