= Ophiclinus brevipinnis =

Conservation status
- Least Concern (IUCN 3.1)

Scientific classification
- Kingdom: Animalia
- Phylum: Chordata
- Class: Actinopterygii
- Order: Blenniiformes
- Family: Clinidae
- Genus: Ophiclinus
- Species: O. brevipinnis

Binomial name
- Ophiclinus brevipinnis A. George & V. G. Springer, 1980

Species of fish

Ophiclinus brevipinnis, the Shortfin snakeblenny, is a species of clinid found in the coastal waters of southern Australia where it inhabits the spaces under rocky ledges and can also be found in weed patches at a depth of around 15 metres (49 ft). It can reach a maximum length of 7 centimetres (2.8 in) TL.
