= Blennioclinus brachycephalus =

Conservation status
- Least Concern (IUCN 3.1)

Scientific classification
- Kingdom: Animalia
- Phylum: Chordata
- Class: Actinopterygii
- Division: Teleostei
- Order: Blenniiformes
- Family: Clinidae
- Genus: Blennioclinus
- Species: B. brachycephalus

Binomial name
- Blennioclinus brachycephalus (Valenciennes, 1836)

Synonyms
- Clinus brachycephalus Valenciennes, 1836

Species of fish

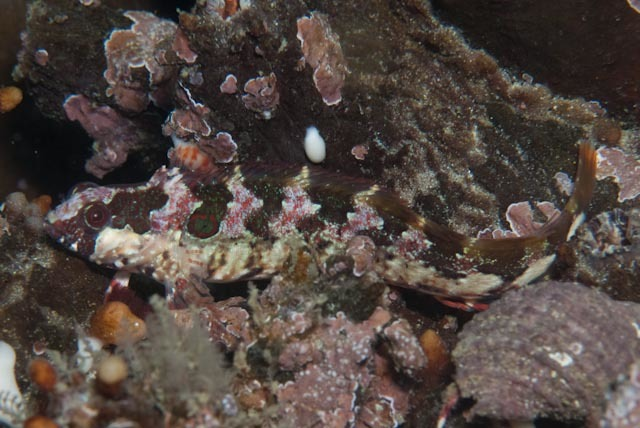
Blennioclinus brachycephalus

Blennioclinus brachycephalus, the Lace klipfish, is a species of clinid found in subtropical waters of the Atlantic Ocean around South Africa. This species can reach a maximum length of 15 centimetres (5.9 in) TL. This species primarily preys on benthic fauna including isopods, amphipods, and mollusks.

== Description ==
- Fins: Dorsal fin spines 26 to 30, rays 8 to 11; Anal fin spines 2, rays 19 to 25; Pectoral fin rays 12–15; Ventral fin spines 1, rays 3.
- Gill rakers (2 to 3)+(3 to 5).
- Vertebrae 17+(28 to 30).
- Lateral line with about 30 to 35 multiple pores in front.
- Body depth 5 to 5.75 in Standard length.
- Head length 4 to 5 in Standard length.
- Eye 2.5 to 3.5 diameters in head length.
- Caudal peduncle 35 to 40% head length, depth 23 to 31% head length.

=== Shape ===
Head short and blunt, slightly depressed on top, the anterior profile well rounded from snout to nape. The front of the head between mouth and eyes is almost vertical but changes to nearly horizontal behind the eyes. There is a wider gap between the third and fourth dorsal fin spines than between the rest, and they are joined by a transparent membrane forming a slight dorsal crest. There is a deep notch between spiny and softer rayed portions of the dorsal fin. The soft rays are higher than the spines and decrease in length towards the tail. Clusters of 3-4 cirri at tips of most dorsal spines. The pectoral fins are rounded and the caudal peduncle moderate. No supraorbital tentacles are present. The cirri on anterior nostrils are flattened, and irregularly trilobed.

=== Colour ===
Body colour is variable and may be basically red, pink, green or brown with several darker irregular vertical bars and sometimes a white longitudinal stripe halfway up the sides from head to tail. Some fish are nearly uniform in colour which is usually a dark brown or green, and most have a red ocellus on a green background above the base of the pectoral fin. Eyes are a matte dark red with red iris and black pupils. The pectoral fins membranes are generally translucent with white base, and the rays are body colour with bands of white. Juveniles similar to adults, generally uniform in colour.

=== Size ===
Attains 15 cm.

== Distribution ==
Both sides of the Cape Peninsula, but more frequently seen in False Bay. Mostly seen at depths of less than 10 m. An isolated collection from Lüderitzbucht, then off Melkbosch beach on the northwest coast of Cape Peninsula to the Kei River; common east of Cape Point.

== Habitat ==
Among stones and sea-urchins in rock-pools, near bottom of the shore; occasionally in weed-beds.

Pools on the open coast containing pebbles, sea urchins and sea anemones.

Not often seen by divers, but more likely in areas with Stephens' codium or among the bases of the kelp Ecklonia maxima.
