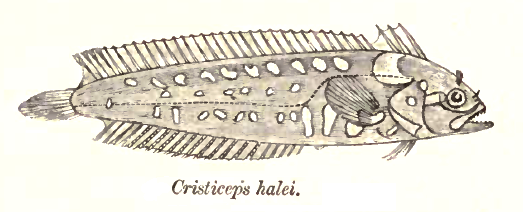

Conservation status
- Least Concern (IUCN 3.1)

Scientific classification
- Kingdom: Animalia
- Phylum: Chordata
- Class: Actinopterygii
- Order: Blenniiformes
- Family: Clinidae
- Genus: Springeratus
- Species: S. xanthosoma

Binomial name
- Springeratus xanthosoma (Bleeker, 1857)

Synonyms
- Clinus xanthosoma Bleeker, 1857; Cristiceps halei F. Day, 1888 questionably a synonym of this species

= Springeratus xanthosoma =

Species of fish

Springeratus xanthosoma is a species of clinid native to coastal areas of the western Pacific and Indian Ocean. It can reach a maximum length of 7 centimetres (2.8 in) TL.
