= Myxodes viridis =

Conservation status
- Least Concern (IUCN 3.1)

Scientific classification
- Kingdom: Animalia
- Phylum: Chordata
- Class: Actinopterygii
- Order: Blenniiformes
- Family: Clinidae
- Genus: Myxodes
- Species: M. viridis

Binomial name
- Myxodes viridis Valenciennes, 1836

Species of fish

Myxodes viridis is a species of clinid native to the Pacific coast of South America from southern Peru to central Chile. This species can reach a maximum length of 13.5 centimetres (5.3 in) TL.
