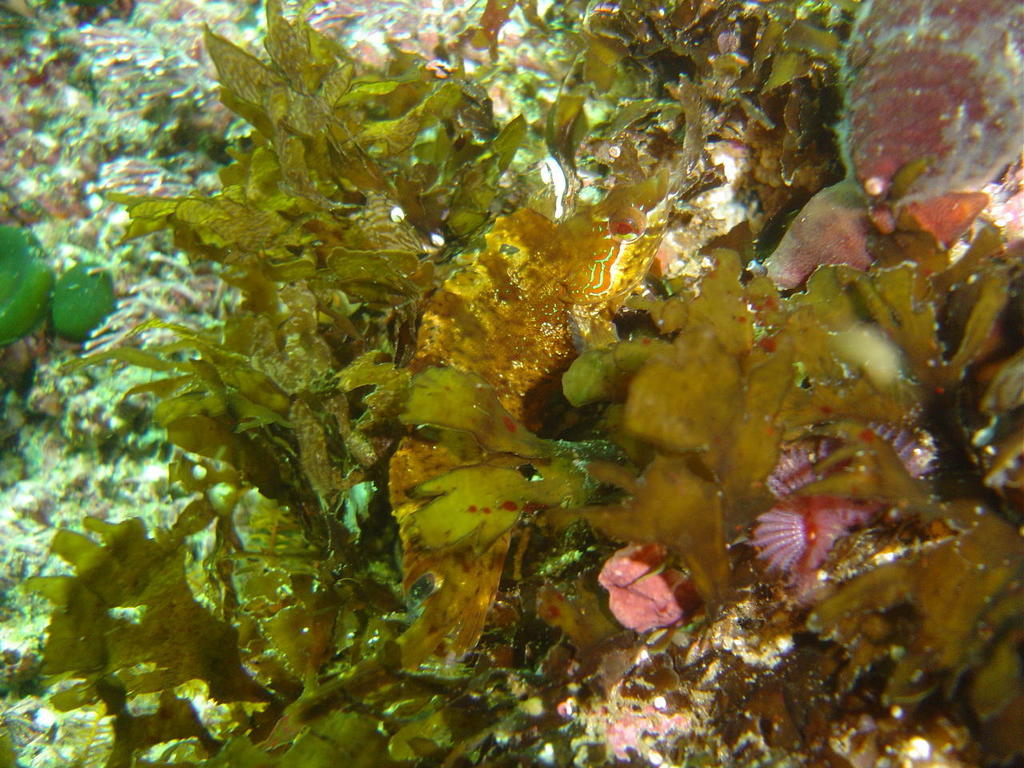

Conservation status
- Least Concern (IUCN 3.1)

Scientific classification
- Kingdom: Animalia
- Phylum: Chordata
- Class: Actinopterygii
- Order: Blenniiformes
- Family: Clinidae
- Genus: Pavoclinus
- Species: P. pavo

Binomial name
- Pavoclinus pavo (Gilchrist & W. W. Thompson, 1908)

Synonyms
- Clinus pavo Gilchrist & W. W. Thompson, 1908

= Pavoclinus pavo =

Species of fish

Pavoclinus pavo, the Peacock klipfish, is a species of clinid found from Lüderitzbucht, Namibia to the Kei River, South Africa where it can be found in weedy areas at the low tide line. It can reach a maximum length of 15 centimetres (5.9 in) TL. This species feeds primarily on amphipods, isopods, gastropods and polychaete worms.
