= Ophiclinus gabrieli =

Conservation status
- Least Concern (IUCN 3.1)

Scientific classification
- Kingdom: Animalia
- Phylum: Chordata
- Class: Actinopterygii
- Order: Blenniiformes
- Family: Clinidae
- Genus: Ophiclinus
- Species: O. gabrieli

Binomial name
- Ophiclinus gabrieli Waite, 1906

Species of fish

Ophiclinus gabrieli, the Frosted snake-blenny, is a species of clinid native to Amphibolis seagrass in the coastal waters of southern Australia. It can reach a maximum length of 16 centimetres (6.3 in) TL. The specific name honours the Australian pharmacist and conchologist Charles John Gabriel (1879-1963), the collector of the type.
