= Springeratus polyporatus =

Conservation status
- Endangered (IUCN 3.1)

Scientific classification
- Kingdom: Animalia
- Phylum: Chordata
- Class: Actinopterygii
- Order: Blenniiformes
- Family: Clinidae
- Genus: Springeratus
- Species: S. polyporatus

Binomial name
- Springeratus polyporatus T. H. Fraser, 1972

Species of fish

Springeratus polyporatus is a species of clinid native to the waters around the Indian Ocean islands of Réunion and Mauritius where it can be found from the surface to 15 metres (49 ft) in depth. It can reach a maximum length of 5 centimetres (2.0 in) SL.
