= Myxodes ornatus =

Conservation status
- Data Deficient (IUCN 3.1)

Scientific classification
- Kingdom: Animalia
- Phylum: Chordata
- Class: Actinopterygii
- Order: Blenniiformes
- Family: Clinidae
- Genus: Myxodes
- Species: M. ornatus

Binomial name
- Myxodes ornatus J. S. Stephens & V. G. Springer, 1974

Species of fish

Myxodes ornatus is a species of clinid native to the Pacific coast of Chile, South America.
