= Ophiclinus antarcticus =

Scientific classification
- Domain: Eukaryota
- Kingdom: Animalia
- Phylum: Chordata
- Class: Actinopterygii
- Order: Blenniiformes
- Family: Clinidae
- Genus: Ophiclinus
- Species: O. antarcticus

Binomial name
- Ophiclinus antarcticus Castelnau, 1872

Synonyms
- Neogunellus sulcatus Castelnau, 1875; Neogunellus homacanthus Herzenstein, 1896; Ophiclinus aethiops McCulloch & Waite, 1918

Species of fish

Ophiclinus antarcticus, the Adelaide snake blenny (or Dusky snake blenny), is a species of clinid found in the coastal waters of southern Australia. It can reach a maximum length of 14 centimetres (5.5 in) TL. It often has dark blotches and speckles on its body and fins, with a series of large white blotches along the midside, dorsal-fin base and just above the anal-fin base. It also has several dark stripes that often radiate from its eyes and dark brown markings on the lips and lower side of the head.
