= Ophiclinops pardalis =

Conservation status
- Data Deficient (IUCN 3.1)

Scientific classification
- Kingdom: Animalia
- Phylum: Chordata
- Class: Actinopterygii
- Order: Blenniiformes
- Family: Clinidae
- Genus: Ophiclinops
- Species: O. pardalis

Binomial name
- Ophiclinops pardalis (McCulloch & Waite, 1918)

Synonyms
- Ophiclinus pardalis McCulloch & Waite, 1918

Species of fish

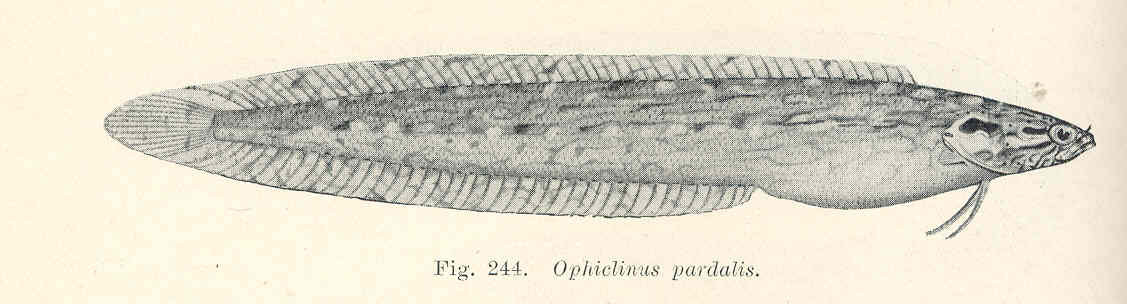
Ophiclinus pardalis

Ophiclinops pardalis, the Spotted snakeblenny, is a species of clinids native to the coastal waters of southern Australia in seagrass beds. It can reach a maximum length of 7 centimetres (2.8 in) TL.
