= Sticharium clarkae =

Conservation status
- Least Concern (IUCN 3.1)

Scientific classification
- Kingdom: Animalia
- Phylum: Chordata
- Class: Actinopterygii
- Order: Blenniiformes
- Family: Clinidae
- Genus: Sticharium
- Species: S. clarkae

Binomial name
- Sticharium clarkae A. George & V. G. Springer, 1980

Species of fish

The dusky crawler (Sticharium clarkae) is a species of clinid native to the coast of southern Australia, where it lives around coastal outcrops in which it can find partially sheltered, sandy bays. It can be found at depths from 5 to 10 m (16 to 33 ft). It can reach a maximum total length of 8 cm (3.1 in). The specific name of this clinid honours ichthyologist Eugenie Clark (1922–2015) of the University of Maryland.
