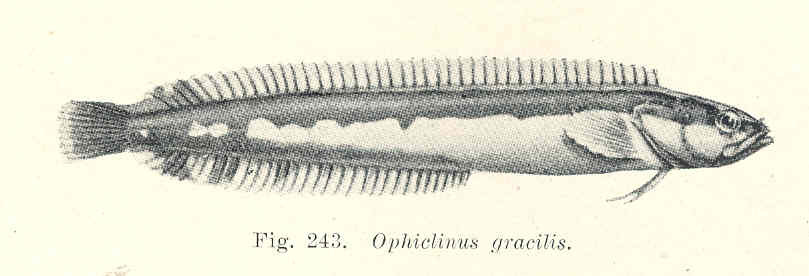

Conservation status
- Least Concern (IUCN 3.1)

Scientific classification
- Kingdom: Animalia
- Phylum: Chordata
- Class: Actinopterygii
- Order: Blenniiformes
- Family: Clinidae
- Genus: Ophiclinus
- Species: O. gracilis

Binomial name
- Ophiclinus gracilis Waite, 1906

= Ophiclinus gracilis =

Species of fish

Ophiclinus gracilis, the Black-back snake-blenny, is a species of clinid native to the coastal waters of southern Australia where it prefers areas with rotting vegetation on silty substrates. It can reach a maximum length of 10 centimetres (3.9 in) TL.
