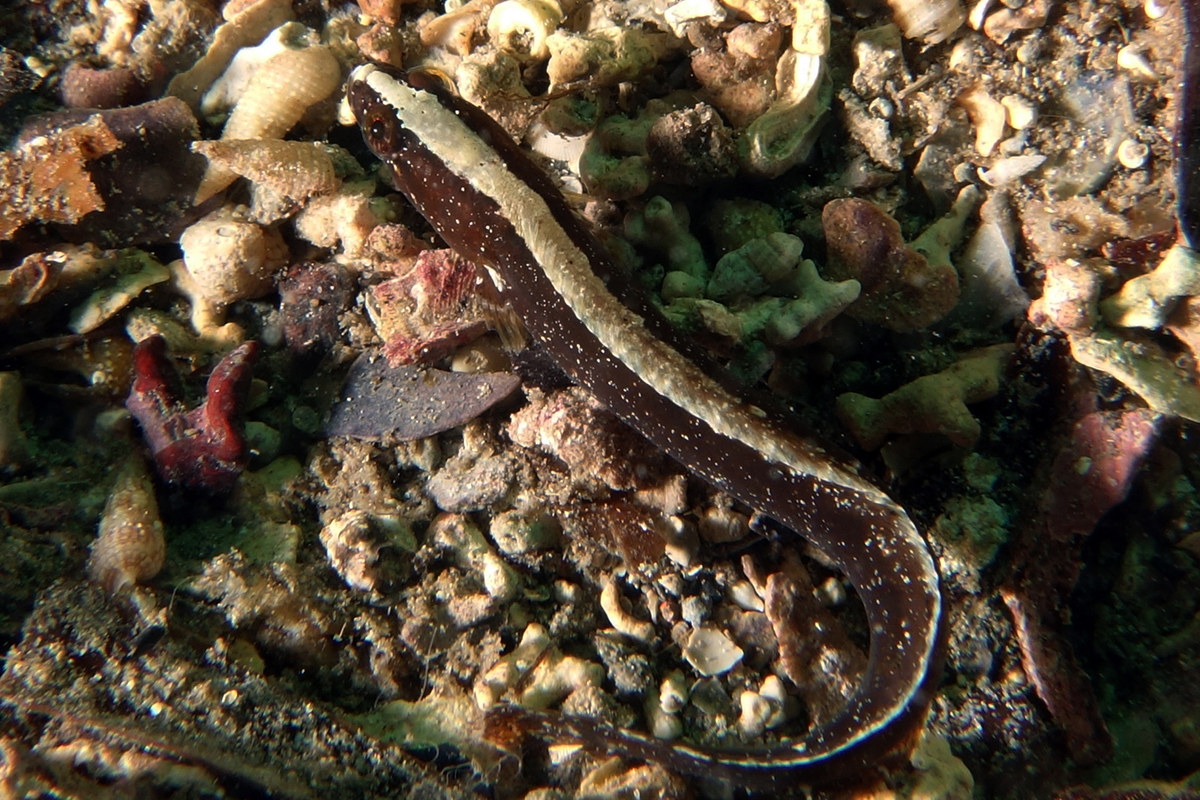

Conservation status
- Least Concern (IUCN 3.1)

Scientific classification
- Kingdom: Animalia
- Phylum: Chordata
- Class: Actinopterygii
- Order: Blenniiformes
- Family: Clinidae
- Genus: Ophiclinus
- Species: O. ningulus

Binomial name
- Ophiclinus ningulus A. George & V. G. Springer, 1980

= Ophiclinus ningulus =

Species of fish

Ophiclinus ningulus, the variable snake-blenny, is a species of clinid found in reefs around southern Australia, preferring areas with plentiful growth of sponges at depths of from 5 to 20 metres (16 to 66 ft). It can reach a maximum length of 7.5 centimetres (3.0 in) TL.
