= Ophiclinops varius =

Conservation status
- Least Concern (IUCN 3.1)

Scientific classification
- Kingdom: Animalia
- Phylum: Chordata
- Class: Actinopterygii
- Order: Blenniiformes
- Family: Clinidae
- Genus: Ophiclinops
- Species: O. varius

Binomial name
- Ophiclinops varius (McCulloch & Waite, 1918)

Synonyms
- Ophiclinus varius (McCulloch & Waite, 1918)

Species of fish

Ophiclinops varius, the variegated snake-blenny, is a species of clinids found in the neritic zone and intertidal coastal waters of southern Australia where it resides in seagrass meadows and camouflages in beds of Amphibolis seagrasses. It can reach a maximum length of 5 centimetres (2.0 in) TL. Sightings of the variegated snake-blenny have been rare, as Ophiclinops varius is very well hidden, resulting in very few photos and a lack of literature. There have been no sightings on iNaturalist.

== Appearance ==
The variegated snake blenny has irregular patches of black or dark brown with gray along the sides and fins. Along the body, a white and grey splotchy pattern helps blend in with seagrass detritus. This detritus, waste or debris, plays an important role in hiding the Variegated Snake-blenny through camouflage. They also have a brown caudal peduncle (part that connects the tail to body) and a brown caudal fin. It has 60-65 dorsal fin rays, 2 anal fins, 12-14 caudal fin rays, 6-10 pectoral fin rays. It has an extended and long dorsal fin that ends close to caudal peduncle. It is colored the same as the body. Variegated snake-blennies are scaleless.

== Geographic distribution ==
The Variegated snake-blenny can be found in benthic, inshore habitats along Australia’s southern coast in the Indian Ocean. They can be found specifically in the waters from Wilsons Promontory in the state of Victoria, to Recherche Archipelago, Western Australia and Northern Tasmania. This includes IMCRA (Integrated Marine and Coastal Regionalisation of Australia) regions of: Southwest Shelf Province, Great Australian Bight Shelf Transition, Spencer Gulf Shelf Province, Western Bass Strait Shelf Transition, Bass Strait Shelf Providence, and Southeast Shelf Transition. Ophiclinops varius is endemic to southern Australian waters. There have been sightings off the eastern shore, in the Coral Sea. Ophiclinops varius can be found in depths ranging from 0 meters to a maximum of 40 meters, yet are most expected at depths from 0 to 10 meters or sometimes reported up to 14 meters.

== Ecology and biology ==
Variegated snake-blennies use anguillioform-locomotion, similar to that of eels, and some sharks. The propulsive force comes from the body through undulation, where the body moves from side to side like a snake. This motion is done through their trunk and tail, form their bodies. Their maximum speed has not been measured, yet because of their locomotion, they most likely cannot move at extremely fast speeds for a prolonged time. Typically, anguilliform swimming types are slow to moderate moving, with a max speed of about 2 bl/s [body length per second]. Their rounded caudal fins though can provide a quick limited burst of speed as a last resort, in the case their camouflage fails them. Variegated snake-blennies live in habitats with slow flows of water, protected by seagrass, such as the aforementioned Amphibolis seagrasses. These grasses can reduce the wave energy of the surrounding water. This most likely provides refuge for the blennies and allowing them to hide among the ridges in the sand or covered amongst the cover of detritus.

=== Diet ===
There are no dietary studies and extremely few sightings of Ophicilus varius, yet like other Temperate Blennies, they most likely eat a mixture of sustenance that can be opportunistically scavenged for among benthic locations. This would include algae, decaying detritus from seagrass, crustaceans, shellfish. Blennies in general are largely herbivores Other blenny species, such as the Molly Miller Blenny, Scartella cristata, can eat cyanobacteria. These fish also live in the Indian Ocean, so it could be ecologically similar to that of the Variegated snake-blenny.

== Taxonomy ==
Only three species are included in the genus Ophiclinops:

Earspot Snake Blenny (Ophiclinops hutchinsi). It is named after Barry J. Hutchins, a former Curator of Fishes at the Western Australian Museum.

Spotted Snake Blenny (Ophiclinops paradalis). It has one iNaturalist sighting as of September 2025.

Variegated Snake Blenny (Ophiclinops varius).

== Conservation status ==
Despite being of “Least Concern,” the last date on which they were assessed was 06 May 2010, over 15 years ago. The last International Union for Conservation of Nature Red List assessment that this species was included in was in 2014, four years after the assessment date. It is noted that this species’s population trend is unknown and the annotation "needs updating."It is deemed “least concern” because the distribution of the species "overlaps" with marine protected areas.

No life history is currently known on the IUCN website. The IUCN Red List calls for studies and further research.
