= Xenopoclinus leprosus =

Conservation status
- Least Concern (IUCN 3.1)

Scientific classification
- Kingdom: Animalia
- Phylum: Chordata
- Class: Actinopterygii
- Order: Blenniiformes
- Family: Clinidae
- Genus: Xenopoclinus
- Species: X. leprosus

Binomial name
- Xenopoclinus leprosus J. L. B. Smith, 1961

Species of fish

Xenopoclinus leprosus, the leprous platanna-klipfish, is a species of clinid found along the coast of South Africa from the Orange River to Algoa Bay. It can be found on substrates of sand, gravel, or pebbles. It can reach a maximum total length of 8 cm (3.1 in) .
