= Pavoclinus graminis =

Conservation status
- Least Concern (IUCN 3.1)

Scientific classification
- Kingdom: Animalia
- Phylum: Chordata
- Class: Actinopterygii
- Order: Blenniiformes
- Family: Clinidae
- Genus: Pavoclinus
- Species: P. graminis

Binomial name
- Pavoclinus graminis (Gilchrist & W. W. Thompson, 1908)

Synonyms
- Clinus graminis Gilchrist & W. W. Thompson, 1908

Species of fish

Pavoclinus graminis, the Grass klipfish, is a species of clinid found along the coast of southern Africa from Inhambane, Mozambique to False Bay South Africa. It is mostly found in tide pools where it prefers weedy areas. It can reach a maximum length of 16 centimetres (6.3 in) TL.
