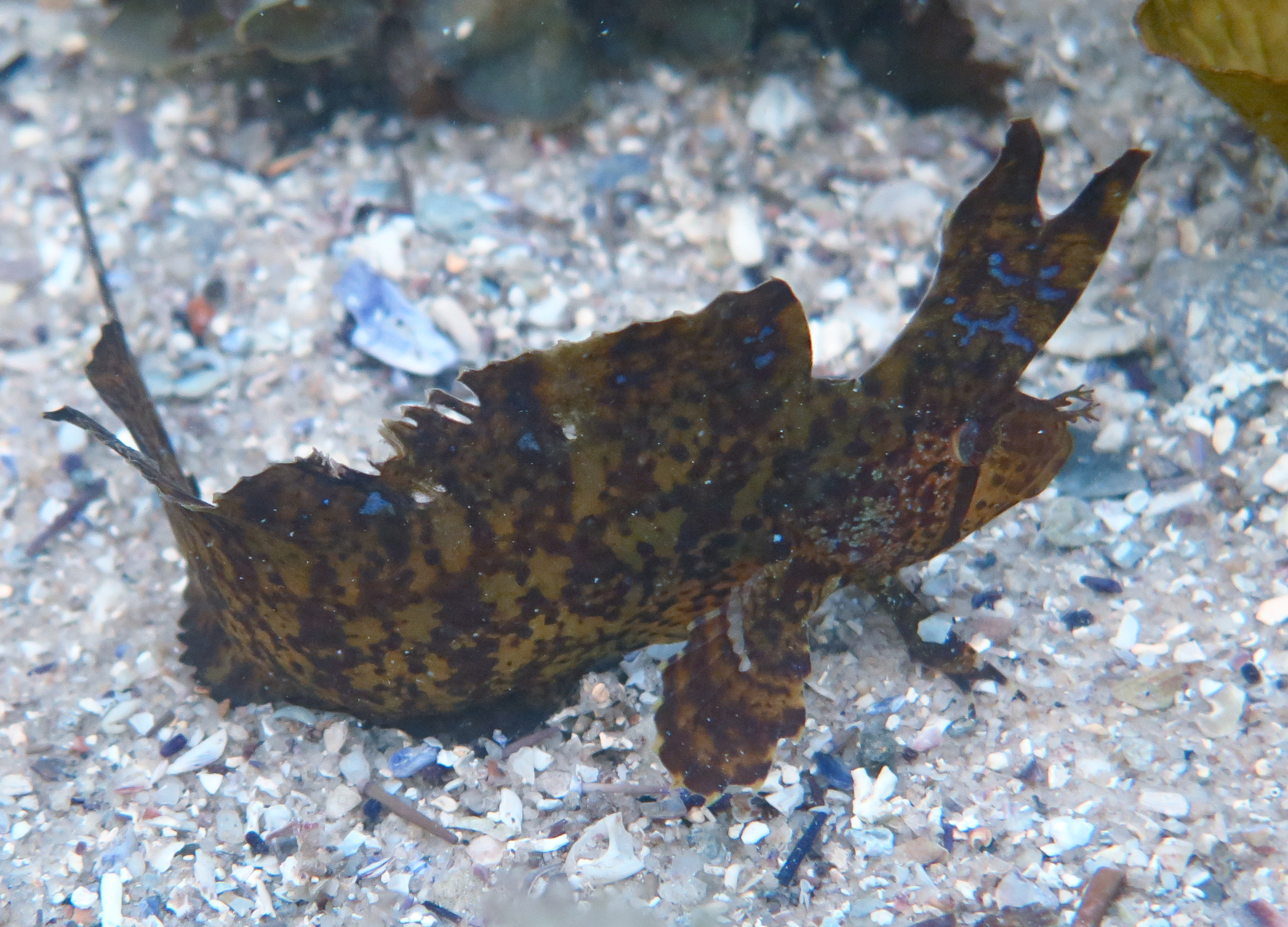

Conservation status
- Least Concern (IUCN 3.1)

Scientific classification
- Kingdom: Animalia
- Phylum: Chordata
- Class: Actinopterygii
- Division: Teleostei
- Order: Blenniiformes
- Family: Clinidae
- Genus: Cristiceps
- Species: C. aurantiacus

Binomial name
- Cristiceps aurantiacus Castelnau, 1879

Synonyms
- Cristiceps pictus W. J. Macleay, 1881

= Cristiceps aurantiacus =

Species of fish

Cristiceps aurantiacus (golden weedfish or yellow crested weedfish) is a species of clinid found around New South Wales, Australia and New Zealand. It lives in tide pools and the subtidal zone to a depth of 30 metres (98 ft). Its diet consists of crustaceans and small fishes. It can reach a length of 22 centimetres (8.7 in) TL.
