= Cristiceps argyropleura =

Conservation status
- Least Concern (IUCN 3.1)

Scientific classification
- Kingdom: Animalia
- Phylum: Chordata
- Class: Actinopterygii
- Order: Blenniiformes
- Family: Clinidae
- Genus: Cristiceps
- Species: C. argyropleura

Binomial name
- Cristiceps argyropleura Kner, 1865

Synonyms
- Cristiceps pataecoides Whitley, 1959

Species of fish

Cristiceps argyropleura, the silver-sided weedfish, is a species of clinid found around southern Australia at depths from 20 to 60 metres (66 to 197 ft) where it is predominantly found in kelp beds. This species can reach a length of 18 centimetres (7.1 in) TL.
