= Sticharium dorsale =

Conservation status
- Least Concern (IUCN 3.1)

Scientific classification
- Kingdom: Animalia
- Phylum: Chordata
- Class: Actinopterygii
- Order: Blenniiformes
- Family: Clinidae
- Genus: Sticharium
- Species: S. dorsale

Binomial name
- Sticharium dorsale Günther, 1867

Species of fish

The sand crawler (Sticharium dorsale) is a species of clinid endemic to the coast of southern Australia. It can reach a maximum total length of 9.5 cm (3.7 in).
