= Myxodes cristatus =

Conservation status
- Least Concern (IUCN 3.1)

Scientific classification
- Kingdom: Animalia
- Phylum: Chordata
- Class: Actinopterygii
- Order: Blenniiformes
- Family: Clinidae
- Genus: Myxodes
- Species: M. cristatus

Binomial name
- Myxodes cristatus Valenciennes, 1836

Species of fish

Myxodes cristatus, the sailfin clinid, is a species of clinid native to the Pacific coast of South America from central to southern Chile. The species was first described by the French zoologist Georges Cuvier in 1829.
