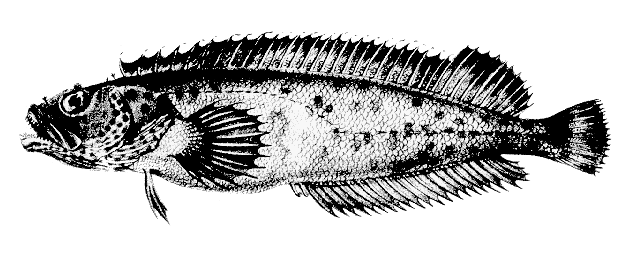

Conservation status
- Least Concern (IUCN 3.1)

Scientific classification
- Kingdom: Animalia
- Phylum: Chordata
- Class: Actinopterygii
- Order: Blenniiformes
- Family: Labrisomidae
- Genus: Auchenionchus
- Species: A. microcirrhis

Binomial name
- Auchenionchus microcirrhis (Valenciennes, 1836)

Synonyms
- Clinus microcirrhis Valenciennes, 1836

= Auchenionchus microcirrhis =

Species of fish

Auchenionchus microcirrhis is a species of labrisomid blenny endemic to the Pacific waters off of Chile. It is a carnivorous species, eating fish, amphipods (juveniles), and decapods (adults). This species can reach 22.2 cm (8.7 in) in total length.
