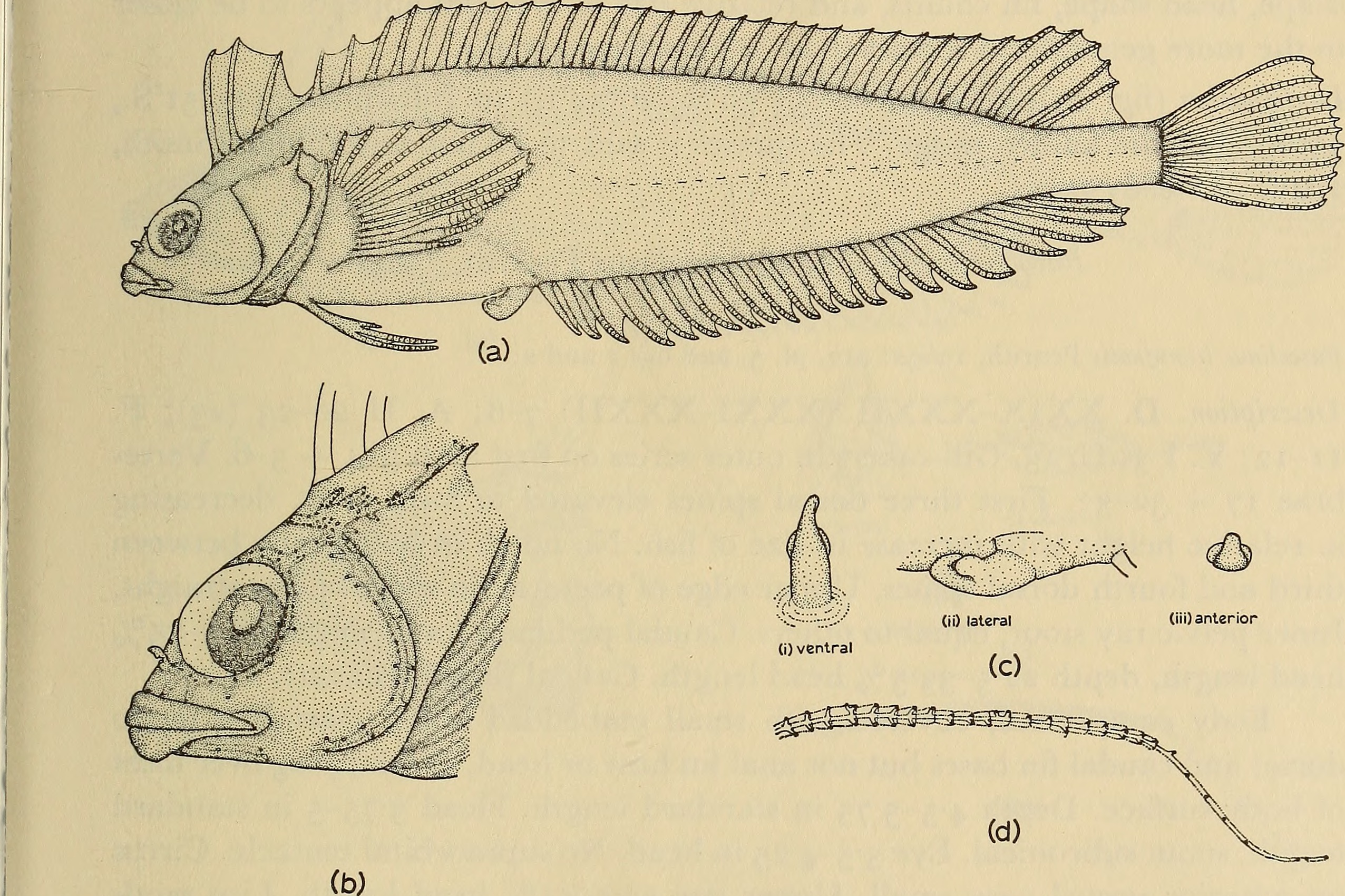
- P. laurentii

Scientific classification
- Kingdom: Animalia
- Phylum: Chordata
- Class: Actinopterygii
- Order: Blenniiformes
- Family: Clinidae
- Genus: Pavoclinus; J. L. B. Smith, 1946

Type species
- Pavoclinus pavo Gilchrist & W. W. Thompson, 1908

= Pavoclinus =

Genus of fishes

Pavoclinus is a genus of clinids found in the southeastern Atlantic and western Indian Ocean coastal waters of southern Africa.

== Species ==
Nine recognized species are placed in this genus:

- Pavoclinus caeruleopunctatus Zsilavecz, 2001
- Pavoclinus graminis (Gilchrist & W. W. Thompson, 1908) (grass klipfish)
- Pavoclinus laurentii (Gilchrist & W. W. Thompson, 1908) (rippled klipfish)
- Pavoclinus litorafontis M. L. Penrith, 1965 (slinky klipfish)
- Pavoclinus mentalis (Gilchrist & W. W. Thompson, 1908) (bearded klipfish)
- Pavoclinus myae Christensen, 1978 (Mya's klipfish)
- Pavoclinus pavo (Gilchrist & W. W. Thompson, 1908) (peacock klipfish)
- Pavoclinus profundus J. L. B. Smith, 1961 (deepwater klipfish)
- Pavoclinus smalei Heemstra & J. E. Wright, 1986 (deep-reef klipfish)
