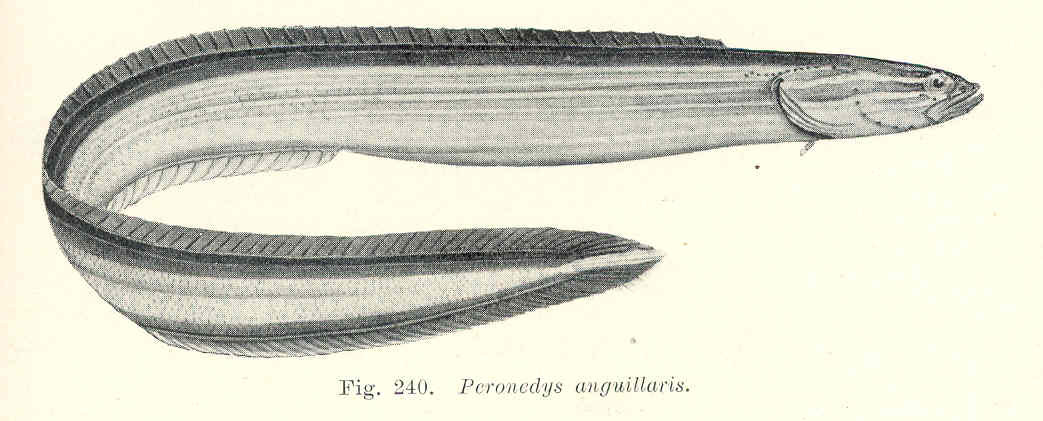

Conservation status
- Data Deficient (IUCN 3.1)

Scientific classification
- Kingdom: Animalia
- Phylum: Chordata
- Class: Actinopterygii
- Order: Blenniiformes
- Family: Clinidae
- Genus: Peronedys
- Species: P. anguillaris

Binomial name
- Peronedys anguillaris Steindachner, 1883

Synonyms
- Scleropteryx bicolor De Vis, 1894; Ophiclinus devisi J. D. Ogilby, 1894; Neogunnelus microchirus Herzenstein, 1896; Eucentronotus zietzi J. D. Ogilby, 1898

= Peronedys anguillaris =

Species of fish

Peronedys anguillaris, the eel blenny, is a species of clinid found in estuaries of southern Australia. It only inhabits beds of eelgrasses where the living grasses are bedded in decaying grasses. It can reach a maximum length of 13 centimetres (5.1 in) TL.
