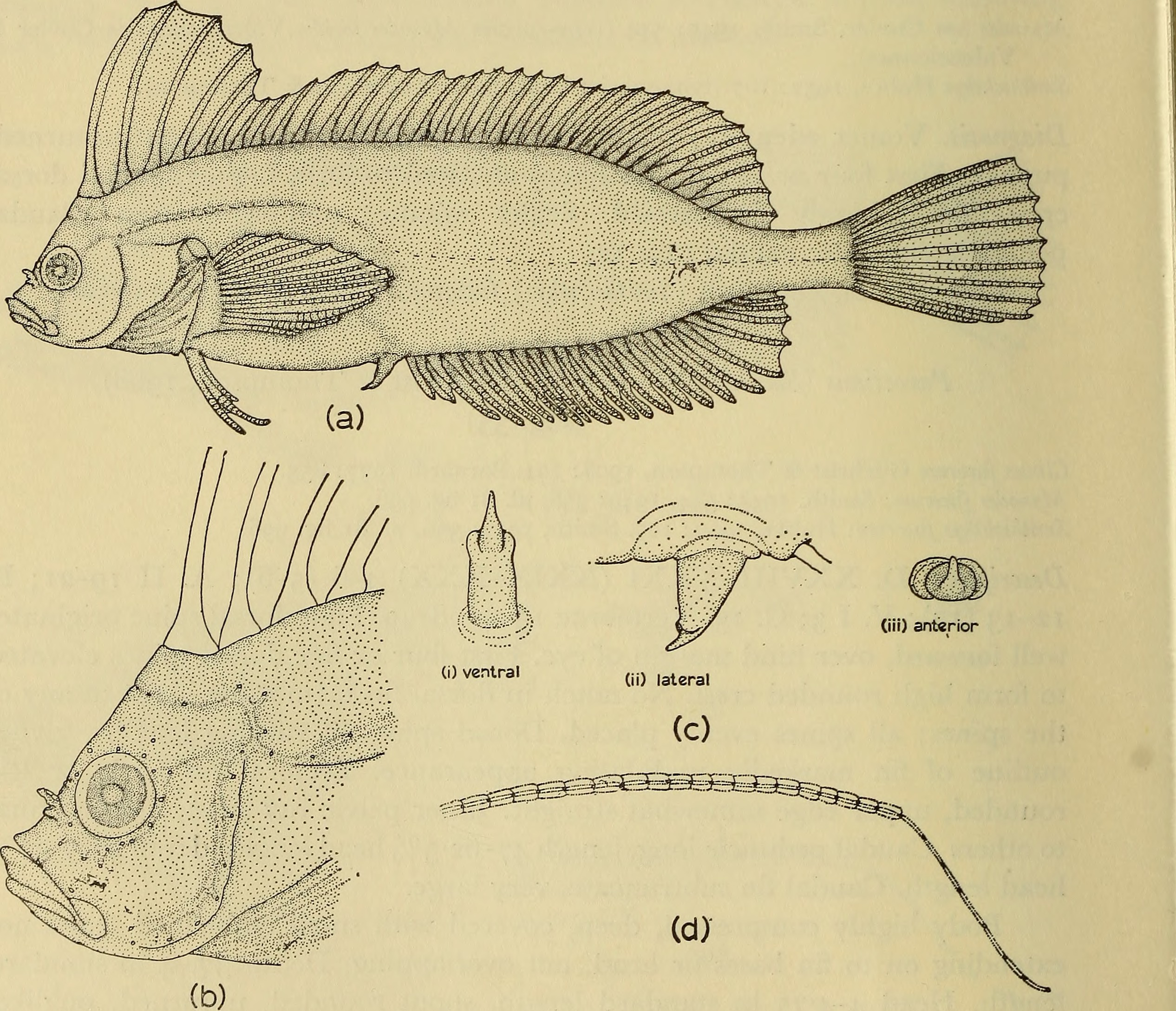
- (a) Lateral view, male, 101 mm, St. James, 16/5/1965, S.A.M.; (b) Head pore system; (c) Intromittent organ of male; (d) Lateral line

Conservation status
- Least Concern (IUCN 3.1)

Scientific classification
- Kingdom: Animalia
- Phylum: Chordata
- Class: Actinopterygii
- Order: Blenniiformes
- Family: Clinidae
- Genus: Smithichthys; C. Hubbs, 1952
- Species: S. fucorum

Binomial name
- Smithichthys fucorum (Gilchrist & W. W. Thompson, 1908)

Synonyms
- Clinus fucorum (Gilchrist & W. W. Thompson, 1908); Myxodes fucorum (Gilchrist & W. W. Thompson, 1908); Pavoclinus fucorum (Gilchrist & W. W. Thompson, 1908)

= Smithichthys fucorum =

Species of fish

The leafy klipfish (Smithichthys fucorum) is a species of clinid found along the coast of South Africa from Cape Point to the Bashee River. Its preferred habitat is amongst seaweed in the subtidal zone. It can reach a maximum total length of 30 cm (12 in). It is currently the only known member of its genus. The generic name honours the South African ichthyologist J. L. B. Smith (1897–1968), while the specific name means belonging to the brown seaweed genus Fucus, a reference to its habitat, colouring, and form.
