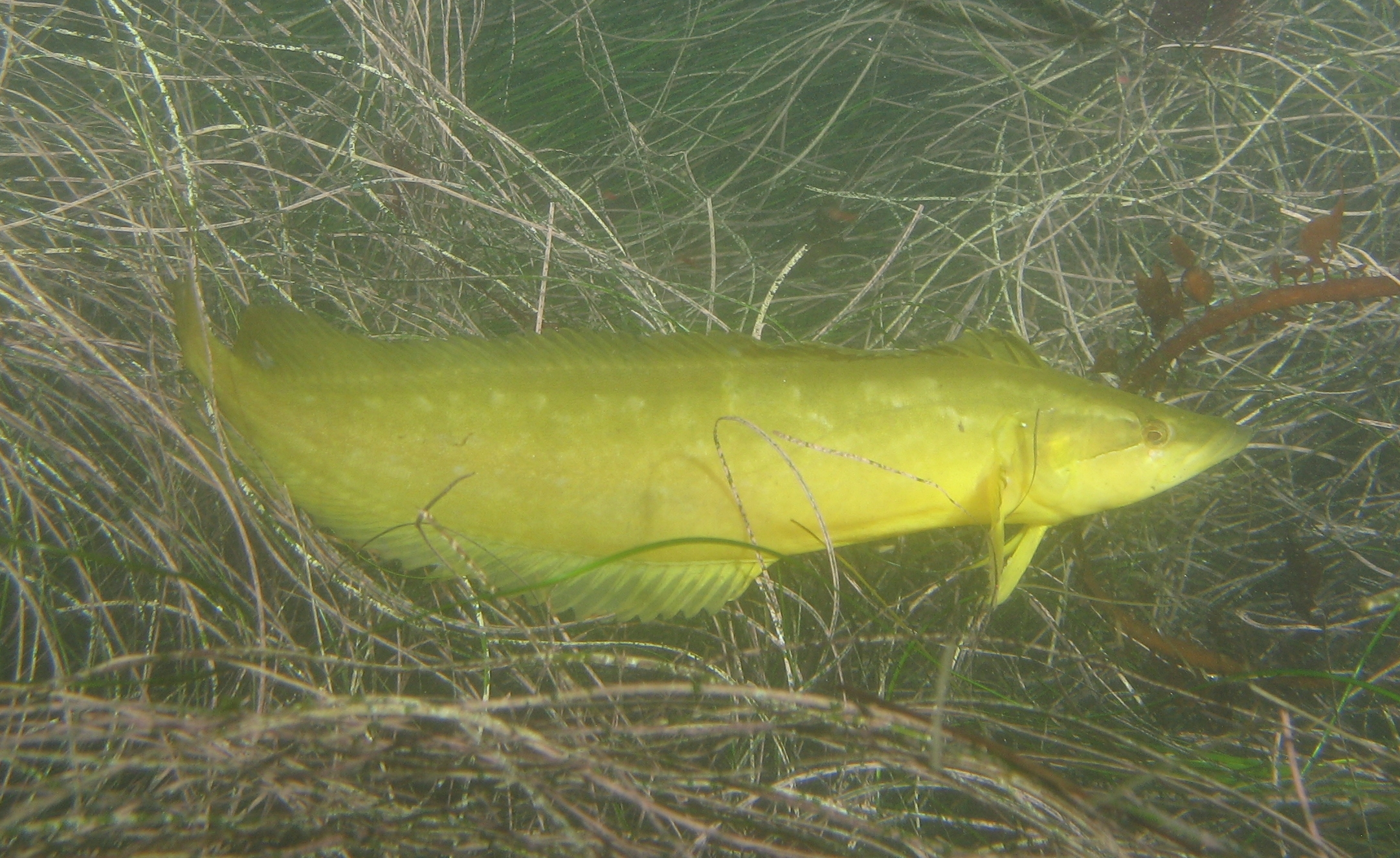

Conservation status
- Least Concern (IUCN 3.1)

Scientific classification
- Kingdom: Animalia
- Phylum: Chordata
- Class: Actinopterygii
- Division: Teleostei
- Order: Blenniiformes
- Family: Clinidae
- Genus: Heterostichus
- Species: H. rostratus

Binomial name
- Heterostichus rostratus Girard, 1854

= Giant kelpfish =

Species of fish

The giant kelpfish (Heterostichus rostratus) is a 10–24 inches (25–61 cm) species of marine fish, and the largest member of the family Clinidae. It is currently the only known member of its genus.

== Description ==
The giant kelpfish has an eel-like, elongated, and compressed body with a pointed head and small, terminal mouth. Its dorsal fin is continuous along the entire top length of the body, ending at the caudal peduncle. The dorsal fin consists of a small section of vertically longer spiny rays close to the head and a soft ray portion connected to the spiny rays.

The pectoral fins are rounded and short while the pelvic fins are small and thin. It has a very long, broad and continuous anal fin, and a forked tail. It has small cycloid scales covering its body used for protection and hydrodynamics.

As the name suggests, this fish looks very similar to the habitat it resides in. The giant kelpfish has three color morphs: red, brown and green, often with melanistic barring or striping patterns depending on sex, developmental stage, and habitat. Because of this cryptic coloration, it is hard to spot by both people and other organisms.

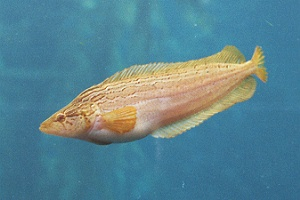

It may be confused with the striped kelpfish (Gibbonsia metzi) which are similar-shaped but are more prominently barred, have a rounded tail and a subterminal mouth.

== Distribution ==
The giant kelpfish is native to the west coast of North America. It is found most commonly in the warmer waters of Point Conception, California, to southern Baja California. It inhabits rocky areas with dense canopies of giant kelp and other large seaweeds. It is also known that they may use eelgrass or surfgrass as a substitute for their preferred habitat of understory algae. Juveniles have been observed to utilize the upper portions of macroalgae while the older individuals gather near the base of the plant. They prefer to live near the surface to moderately deep waters due to the abundance of sunlight and in turn, dense vegetation for their nests and protection.

== Reproduction and courtship ==
The giant kelpfish is oviparous, as opposed to some other members of the Clinidae family that are viviparous and bear live young. Giant kelpfish spawn all year, but most often in the spring. Spawning has been recorded to take about 40–60 minutes. Eggs are carried and deposited in the nest by the female, while the male chases away any potential intruders. The male comes in to fertilize the eggs various times throughout this process and immediately after, returns to guarding. The male's territory consists of the oviposition site and is guarded heavily when eggs are present and sparsely when they are not.

The male defends against conspecifics and predators both when the female is in the nest and after she has deposited and left it. Males may spot a conspecific up to 3 metres (9.8 ft) away from their territory and will react to it depending on size and type of species. It is unclear which sex creates the nest/territory, seeing as they spawn year-round, and have nests ever present. When the nest is created, it is made with soft red and or brown algae and no hard substances. It is kept well-concealed within the kelp beds.

Eggs are either brown or red, due to the color of the yolk. The female lays 400–1200 eggs and spaces them out among the algae nests. They develop very quickly and hatch at around 2 weeks. This species of fish has a planktonic larval stage that lasts about 2 months. There may be a high mortality rate during this time while they are growing exponentially and are adapting to capturing larger prey and fulfilling their caloric intake requirements. During this phase of its life, they are free drifting, free floating and live among the plankton and they eventually settle into the kelp forests. This adaptation allows them to disperse and develop into juveniles. They eventually become sexually mature when they are about 2–3 years old.

When a female approaches a male's territory, the male courts her by performing a series of behaviors such as head shakes, expansion of fins, and spawning quivers as well as nipping at the female. It has also been observed that the male exhibits a nuptial melanistic striping pattern in which they alter their coloration for the purpose of sexual signaling. They may appear more vibrantly green or yellow. This indicates to the female that they are reproductively ready, fit and healthy individuals. The females are not known to alter their behavior during the courtship process.

This species can reach a maximum total length of 61 cm (24 in), and has been reported to live for up to 4 years. Females are observed to grow larger and live longer than males. Their elongated, flattened bodies and independently controlled pectoral fins allow them to make precise maneuvers through dense vegetation to evade predators as well as to ambush prey. Their broad continuous fins are indicators of slow-moving environments. They are not fast, continuous swimmers but instead are well equipped for short burst movement.

== Diet ==
The giant kelpfish is a carnivorous bottom-feeding species. Its diet consists of small crustaceans, mollusks, and other fishes. It has a terminal mouth, a characteristic of ambush predators. Kelpfish larvae eat items such as single celled algae and mollusk larvae.

== Conservation status ==
According to the IUCN, the giant kelpfish is of least concern, but nonetheless faces many human-induced pressures. A potential threat that may arise is loss of habitat due to climate change and its resulting consequences such as ocean acidification and pollution, as well as destruction and/or massive die-offs of kelp forests. This poses a threat because this species depends on dense canopies of kelp for protection from predators and for reproduction. They may also be threatened by invasive species and the overharvesting of kelp for human use.
