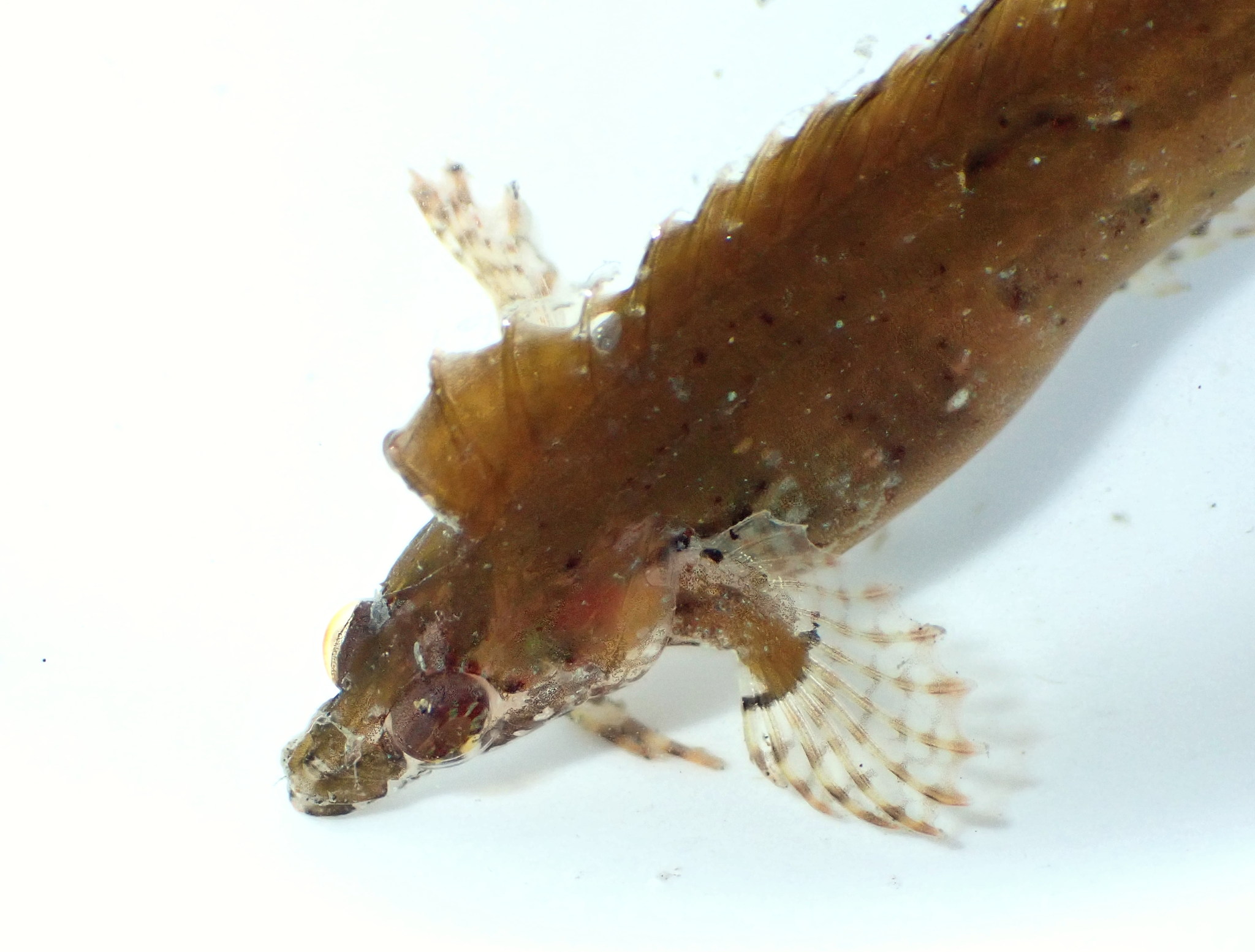

Conservation status
- Least Concern (IUCN 3.1)

Scientific classification
- Kingdom: Animalia
- Phylum: Chordata
- Class: Actinopterygii
- Order: Blenniiformes
- Family: Clinidae
- Genus: Ericentrus; Gill, 1893
- Species: E. rubrus

Binomial name
- Ericentrus rubrus (F. W. Hutton, 1872)

Synonyms
- Sticharium rubrum F. W. Hutton, 1872

= Ericentrus =

Genus of fishes

Ericentrus rubrus, the orange clinid, is a species of clinid endemic to the waters around New Zealand where it can be found in tide pools and in the subtidal zone from low water to depths of about 30 metres (98 ft). It prefers to inhabit beds of brown algae where it preys on the small crustaceans that also inhabit these areas. It is currently the only known member of the genus Ericentrus.
