= Muraenoclinus dorsalis =

Conservation status
- Least Concern (IUCN 3.1)

Scientific classification
- Kingdom: Animalia
- Phylum: Chordata
- Class: Actinopterygii
- Order: Blenniiformes
- Family: Clinidae
- Genus: Muraenoclinus
- Species: M. dorsalis

Binomial name
- Muraenoclinus dorsalis (Bleeker, 1859)

Synonyms
- Clinus dorsalis Bleeker, 1859

Species of fish

Muraenoclinus dorsalis, the nosestripe klipfish, is a species of clinid native to the Atlantic coast of southern Africa from Namibia to Natal, South Africa where it can be found in stony tide pools. It is viviparous. This species can reach a maximum length of 10 centimetres (3.9 in) TL. It is currently the only known member of its genus.
