= Myxodes =

Scientific classification
- Kingdom: Animalia
- Phylum: Chordata
- Class: Actinopterygii
- Order: Blenniiformes
- Family: Clinidae
- Genus: Myxodes; G. Cuvier, 1829

Type species
- Myxodes viridis Valenciennes, 1836

Genus of fishes

Myxodes is a genus of clinids found along the Pacific coast of South America from Peru to Chile.

== Species ==
There are currently three recognized species in this genus:

- Myxodes cristatus Valenciennes, 1836 (Sailfin clinid)
- Myxodes ornatus J. S. Stephens & V. G. Springer, 1974
- Myxodes viridis Valenciennes, 1836
