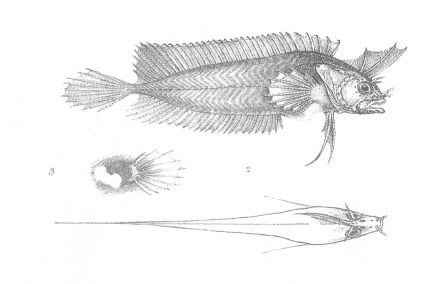
- Crested Weedfish (C. australis) from John Lort Stokes 1846 Discoveries in Australia (as C. axillaris)

Scientific classification
- Kingdom: Animalia
- Phylum: Chordata
- Class: Actinopterygii
- Order: Blenniiformes
- Family: Clinidae
- Genus: Cristiceps; Valenciennes, 1836

Type species
- Cristiceps australis Valenciennes, 1836

= Cristiceps =

Genus of fishes

Cristiceps is a genus of clinids native to the Indo-Pacific waters around Australia and New Zealand.

== Species ==
- Cristiceps argyropleura Kner, 1865 (Silver-sided weedfish)
- Cristiceps aurantiacus Castelnau, 1879 (Golden weedfish)
- Cristiceps australis Valenciennes, 1836 (Crested weedfish)
