= Auchenionchus crinitus =

Conservation status
- Least Concern (IUCN 3.1)

Scientific classification
- Kingdom: Animalia
- Phylum: Chordata
- Class: Actinopterygii
- Division: Teleostei
- Order: Blenniiformes
- Family: Labrisomidae
- Genus: Auchenionchus
- Species: A. crinitus

Binomial name
- Auchenionchus crinitus (Jenyns, 1841)

Synonyms
- Clinus crinitus Jenyns, 1841

Species of fish

Auchenionchus crinitus is a species of labrisomid blenny endemic to the Pacific waters off of Chile.
