= Ophiclinops =

Scientific classification
- Kingdom: Animalia
- Phylum: Chordata
- Class: Actinopterygii
- Order: Blenniiformes
- Family: Clinidae
- Genus: Ophiclinops; Whitley, 1932

Type species
- Ophiclinus pardalis McCulloch & Waite, 1918

Genus of fishes

Ophiclinops is a genus of clinids native to the coast of southern Australia.

== Species ==
There are currently three recognized species in this genus:

- Ophiclinops hutchinsi A. George & V. G. Springer, 1980 (Earspot snakeblenny)
- Ophiclinops pardalis (McCulloch & Waite, 1918) (Spotted snakeblenny)
- Ophiclinops varius (McCulloch & Waite, 1918) (Variegated snake-blenny)
