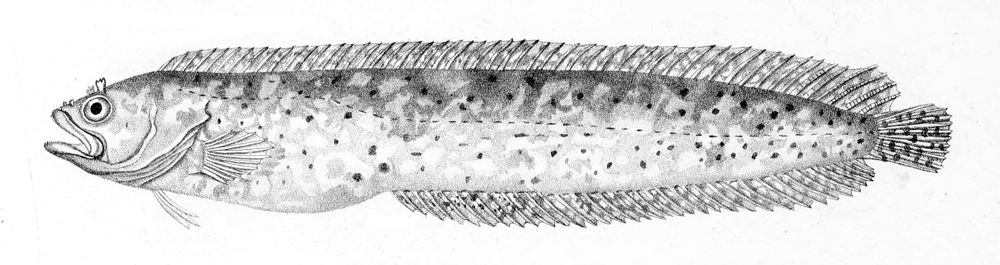
- Snaky Klipfish (B. anguillaris)

Scientific classification
- Kingdom: Animalia
- Phylum: Chordata
- Class: Actinopterygii
- Order: Blenniiformes
- Family: Clinidae
- Genus: Blennophis; Swainson, 1839

Type species
- Clinus anguillaris Valenciennes, 1836

= Blennophis =

Genus of fishes

Blennophis is a genus of clinids found in the southeastern Atlantic ocean.

== Species ==
There are currently two recognized species in this genus:

- Blennophis anguillaris (Valenciennes, 1836) (Snaky klipfish)
- Blennophis striatus (Gilchrist & W. W. Thompson, 1908) (Striped klipfish)
