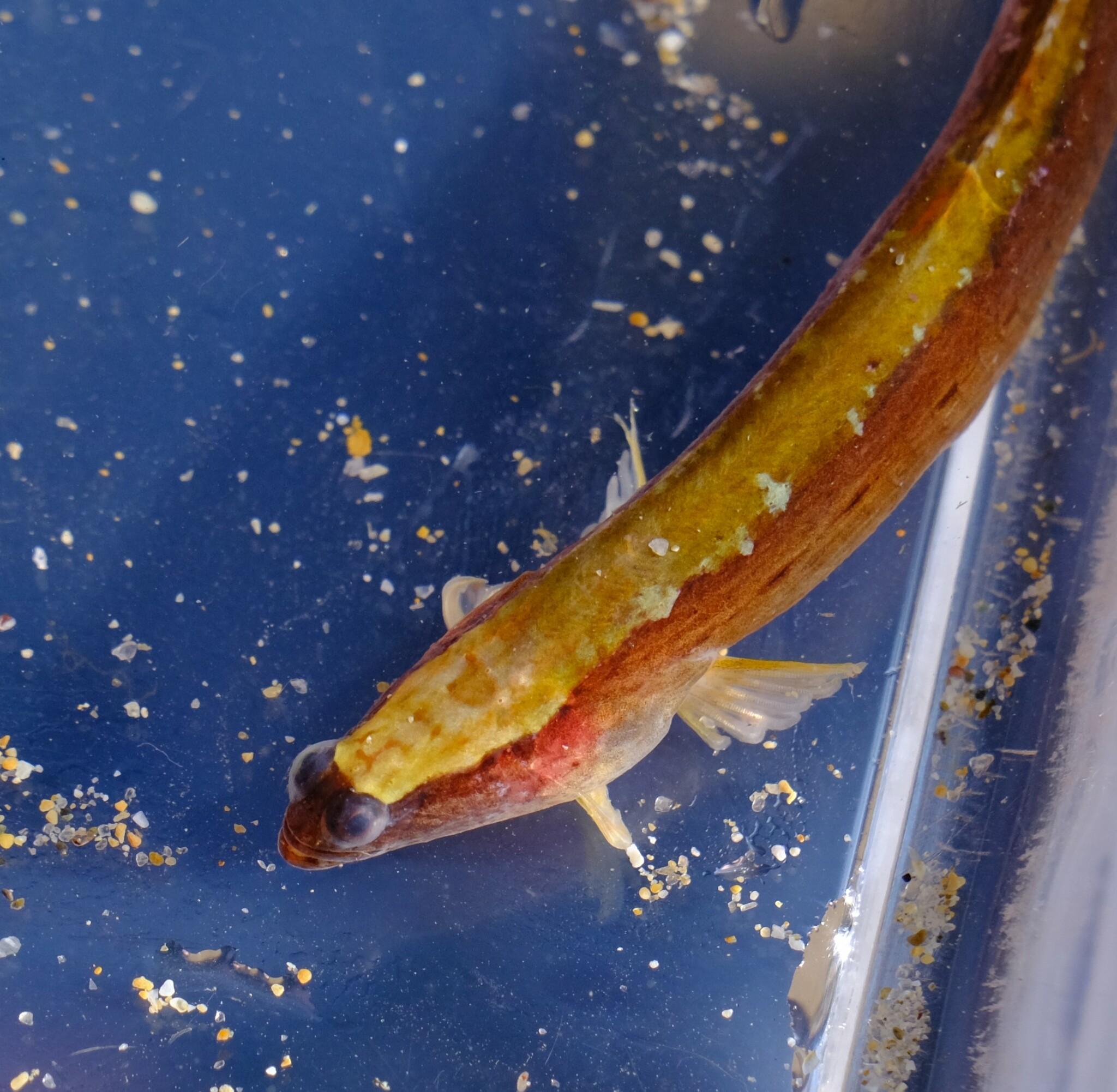

Scientific classification
- Domain: Eukaryota
- Kingdom: Animalia
- Phylum: Chordata
- Class: Actinopterygii
- Order: Blenniiformes
- Family: Clinidae
- Genus: Sticharium; Günther, 1867

Type species
- Sticharium dorsale Günther, 1867

= Sticharium =

Genus of fishes

Sticharium is a genus of clinids native to the coastal waters of southern Australia.

== Species ==
Two species are recognized in this genus:

- Sticharium clarkae A. George & V. G. Springer, 1980 (dusky crawler)
- Sticharium dorsale Günther, 1867 (sand crawler)
