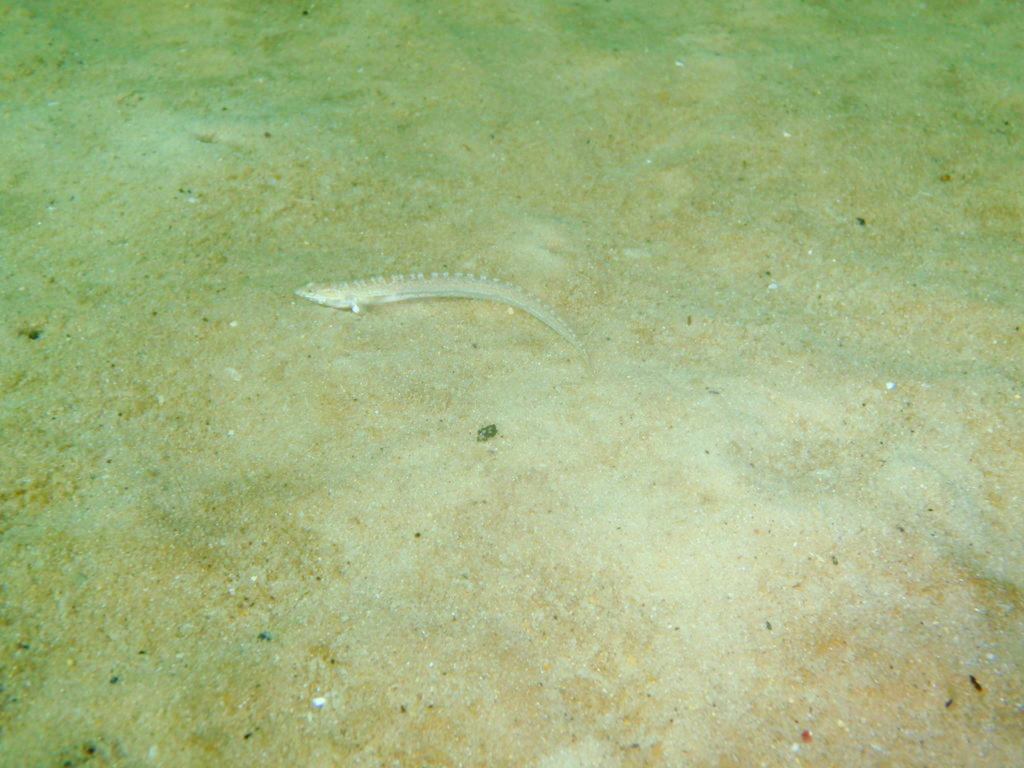
- Cancelloxus longior

Scientific classification
- Kingdom: Animalia
- Phylum: Chordata
- Class: Actinopterygii
- Order: Blenniiformes
- Family: Clinidae
- Genus: Cancelloxus; J. L. B. Smith, 1961

Type species
- Cancelloxus burrelli J. L. B. Smith, 1961

= Cancelloxus =

Genus of fishes

Cancelloxus is a genus of clinids found in the southeastern Atlantic ocean.

== Species ==
There are currently three recognized species in this genus:

- Cancelloxus burrelli J. L. B. Smith, 1961 (Slender platanna-klipfish)
- Cancelloxus elongatus Heemstra & J. E. Wright, 1986 (Whiteblotched klipfish)
- Cancelloxus longior Prochazka & Griffiths, 1991
