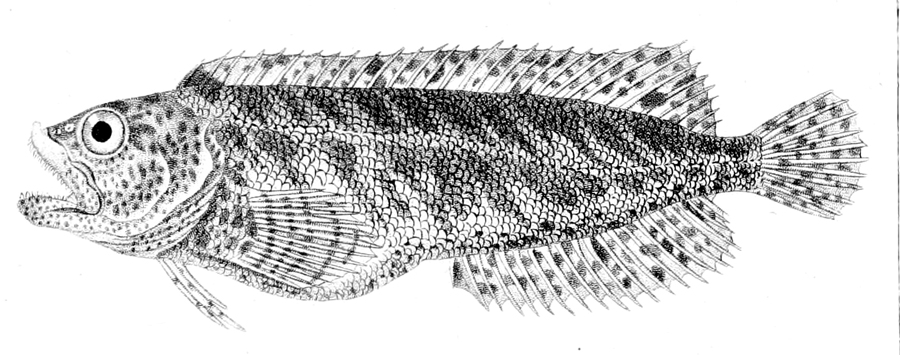
- A. variolosus

Scientific classification
- Kingdom: Animalia
- Phylum: Chordata
- Class: Actinopterygii
- Division: Teleostei
- Order: Blenniiformes
- Family: Labrisomidae
- Genus: Auchenionchus; T. N. Gill, 1860

Type species
- Clinus variolosus Valenciennes, 1836

Synonyms
- Chalacoclinus F. de Buen, 1962; Flabelliclinus F. de Buen, 1962

= Auchenionchus =

Genus of fishes

Auchenionchus is a genus of labrisomid blennies endemic to the Pacific waters off of Chile.

== Species ==
Auchenionchus contains these currently recognized species:

- Auchenionchus crinitus (Jenyns, 1841)
- Auchenionchus microcirrhis (Valenciennes, 1836)
- Auchenionchus variolosus (Valenciennes, 1836)

== Etymology ==
The generic name is a compound of the Greek auchen meaning "neck" or "nape" and onchos meaning "tubercle" or "protuberance", this is presumed to refer to the tiny nuchal tentacle of the type species.
