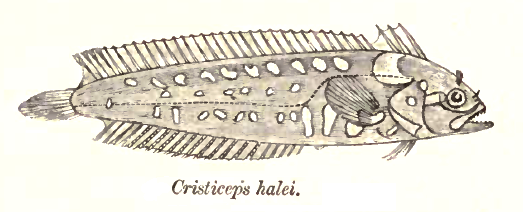
- Springeratus xanthosoma

Scientific classification
- Kingdom: Animalia
- Phylum: Chordata
- Class: Actinopterygii
- Order: Blenniiformes
- Family: Clinidae
- Genus: Springeratus; S. C. Shen, 1971

Type species
- Clinus xanthosoma Bleeker, 1857

= Springeratus =

Genus of fishes

Springeratus is a genus of clinids found in the southwestern Pacific and western Indian Ocean. The generic name honours the American taxonomist and ichthyologist Victor G. Springer.

== Species ==
There are currently three recognized species in this genus:

- Springeratus caledonicus (Sauvage, 1874) (Caledonian weedfish)
- Springeratus polyporatus T. H. Fraser, 1972
- Springeratus xanthosoma (Bleeker, 1857)
