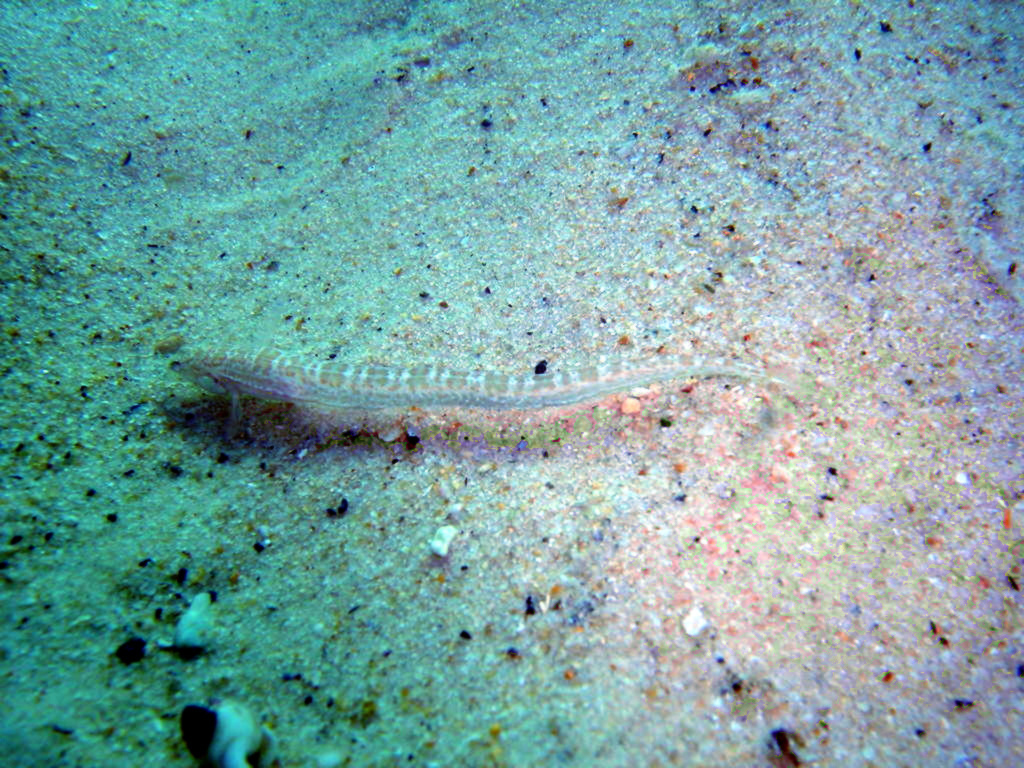

Conservation status
- Least Concern (IUCN 3.1)

Scientific classification
- Kingdom: Animalia
- Phylum: Chordata
- Class: Actinopterygii
- Order: Blenniiformes
- Family: Clinidae
- Genus: Cancelloxus
- Species: C. longior

Binomial name
- Cancelloxus longior Prochazka & Griffiths, 1991

= Cancelloxus longior =

Species of fish

Cancelloxus longior is a species of clinid found in subtropical waters of the South African coast. It can be found in areas with a sand substrate from the intertidal zone to a depth of about 10 metres (33 ft). Males of this species can reach a maximum length of 9.1 centimetres (3.6 in) SL, while females can reach a maximum length of 12.1 centimetres (4.8 in) SL.

== Description ==
- Fins: Dorsal fin spines 38 to 43, rays 11 to 15; Anal fin spines 2, rays 51 to 57; Pectoral fin rays 13 to 15; Ventral fin spines 1, rays 3; Caudal fin rays 11 to 15
- Gill rakers in outer series of first arch 4+6.
- Vertebrae (17 to 18)+(56 to 57).
- Body depth 8.6 to 12.7 in Standard length.
- Head length 5.1 to 6.7 in Standard length.
- Eye 4.2 to 5.4 diameters in head length.
- Caudal peduncle 25 to 38% head length, depth 16 to 24% head length.

Shape:

Body very slender, elongate and snake-like, not depressed. Head short and depressed, sharply pointed, with lower jaw that projects prominently. No cirri above the eye. Dorsal fin low and even

Colour:

Body white with pale cream to light brown blotches, forming irregular saddles on the back, or off-white with a dense pattern of small irregular mauve spots which are enlarged on the dorsal surface and become sparse below the lateral line. The fish has a translucent appearance. Below the saddles is a pearly horizontal line, separated by a thin white, then light brown line from the white to pearly white ventral area. The pupils of the eyes are black with a yellow to orange iris. The rest of the eye is blotched like the adjacent area.

Size:

Attains 121mm.

== Distribution ==
Groenrivier on the West coast of South Africa to Fishhoek.

== Habitat ==
Fine, pale and densely packed sandy areas to about 10m, with the sand having an irregular surface, without distinct ridges. Such sand is more commonly found in calm areas behind headlands and in bays. Sand may not be a shallow cover over rocks, but must be of substantial depth. Open expanses are preferred.

== Behaviour ==
The fish lies just below the surface area of the sand, showing at most the head. It digs itself in by slowly moving the "S" shape sideways, only leaving the head exposed. The depression left by the body is generally very apparent initially, but the fine sand settles in the depression, rapidly evening the surface out, and the fish becomes virtually invisible.

== Etymology ==
Longior: meaning longer, referring to the extremely elongate body form.
