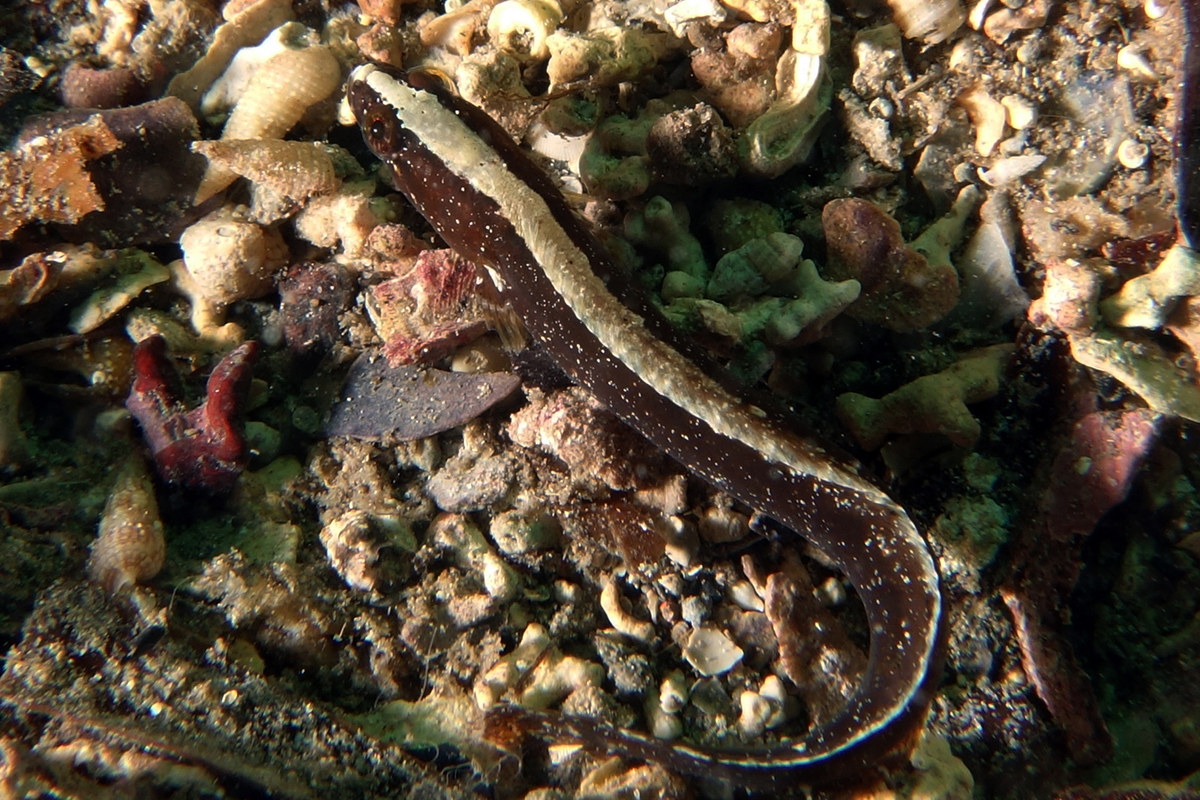
- A variable snake blenny, Ophiclinus ningulus, at Port Hughes, South Australia

Scientific classification
- Domain: Eukaryota
- Kingdom: Animalia
- Phylum: Chordata
- Class: Actinopterygii
- Order: Blenniiformes
- Family: Clinidae
- Genus: Ophiclinus; Castelnau, 1872

Type species
- Ophiclinus antarcticus Castelnau, 1872

= Ophiclinus =

Genus of fishes

Ophiclinus is a genus of clinids native to the coastal waters around Australia.

== Species ==
There are currently six recognized species in this genus:

- Ophiclinus antarcticus Castelnau, 1872 (Adelaide snakeblenny)
- Ophiclinus brevipinnis A. George & V. G. Springer, 1980 (Shortfin snakeblenny)
- Ophiclinus gabrieli Waite, 1906 (Frosted snake-blenny)
- Ophiclinus gracilis Waite, 1906 (Black-back snake-blenny)
- Ophiclinus ningulus A. George & V. G. Springer, 1980 (Variable snake-blenny)
- Ophiclinus pectoralis A. George & V. G. Springer, 1980 (Whiteblotch snakeblenny)
