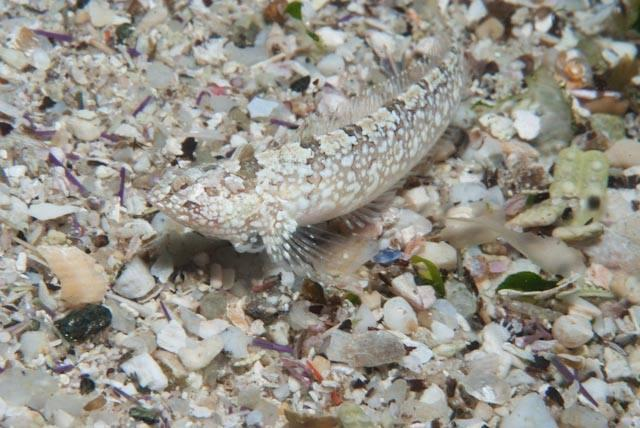
- Platanna Klipfish Xenopoclinus kochi

Scientific classification
- Kingdom: Animalia
- Phylum: Chordata
- Class: Actinopterygii
- Order: Blenniiformes
- Family: Clinidae
- Genus: Xenopoclinus; J. L. B. Smith, 1948

Type species
- Xenopoclinus kochi J. L. B. Smith, 1948

= Xenopoclinus =

Genus of fishes

Xenopoclinus is a small genus of clinids native to the coast of South Africa.

== Species ==
Two recognized species are in this genus:

- Xenopoclinus kochi J. L. B. Smith, 1948 (Platanna klipfish)
- Xenopoclinus leprosus J. L. B. Smith, 1961 (leprous platanna-klipfish)
