= Blennioclinus =

Scientific classification
- Kingdom: Animalia
- Phylum: Chordata
- Class: Actinopterygii
- Order: Blenniiformes
- Family: Clinidae
- Genus: Blennioclinus; T. N. Gill, 1860

Type species
- Clinus brachycephalus Valenciennes, 1836

Genus of fishes

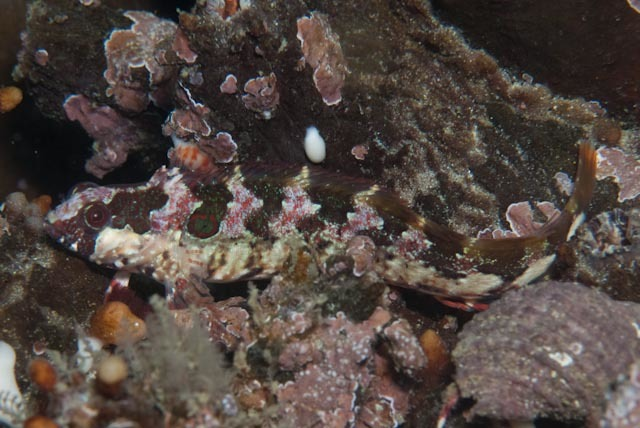
Blennioclinus brachycephalus. stone dog, gordons bay

Blennioclinus is a genus of clinids found in the southeastern Atlantic and western Indian Ocean.

== Species ==
There are currently two recognized species in this genus:

- Blennioclinus brachycephalus (Valenciennes, 1836) (Lace klipfish)
- Blennioclinus stella J. L. B. Smith, 1946 (Silverbubble klipfish)
