= Clinitrachus =

Conservation status
- Least Concern (IUCN 3.1)

Scientific classification
- Kingdom: Animalia
- Phylum: Chordata
- Class: Actinopterygii
- Division: Teleostei
- Order: Blenniiformes
- Family: Clinidae
- Genus: Clinitrachus; Swainson, 1839
- Species: C. argentatus

Binomial name
- Clinitrachus argentatus (A. Risso, 1810)

Synonyms
- Blennius argentatus A. Risso, 1810; Cristiceps argentatus (A. Risso, 1810)

Species of fish

Clinitrachus argentatus, the cline, is a species of clinid found in shallow waters of the eastern Atlantic and the Mediterranean Sea. This species feeds primarily on benthic invertebrates. This species is currently the only known member of its genus.

== Description ==
Clinitrachus argentatus has a highly elongated oval-shaped, laterally compressed body. There is a ridge on the head behind the eye which is triangular in shape and is attached to branched tentacles. On the margin of the tube-shaped anterior nostril is another tentacle, and there is a smaller tentacle near the posterior nostril. The dorsal fin has an indentation where the hard spines give way o the softer rays. The colour of the body varies from light grey to dark brown, occasionally it can be purplish, with lines of small silver grey spots along the flanks underneath the lateral line with more spots scattered above it. The head is patterned with silver grey, the upper part of the head is lighter and there is a star-like pattern around the eye. The fins are the same colour as the body. This species can reach a maximum length of 10 centimetres (3.9 in) TL.

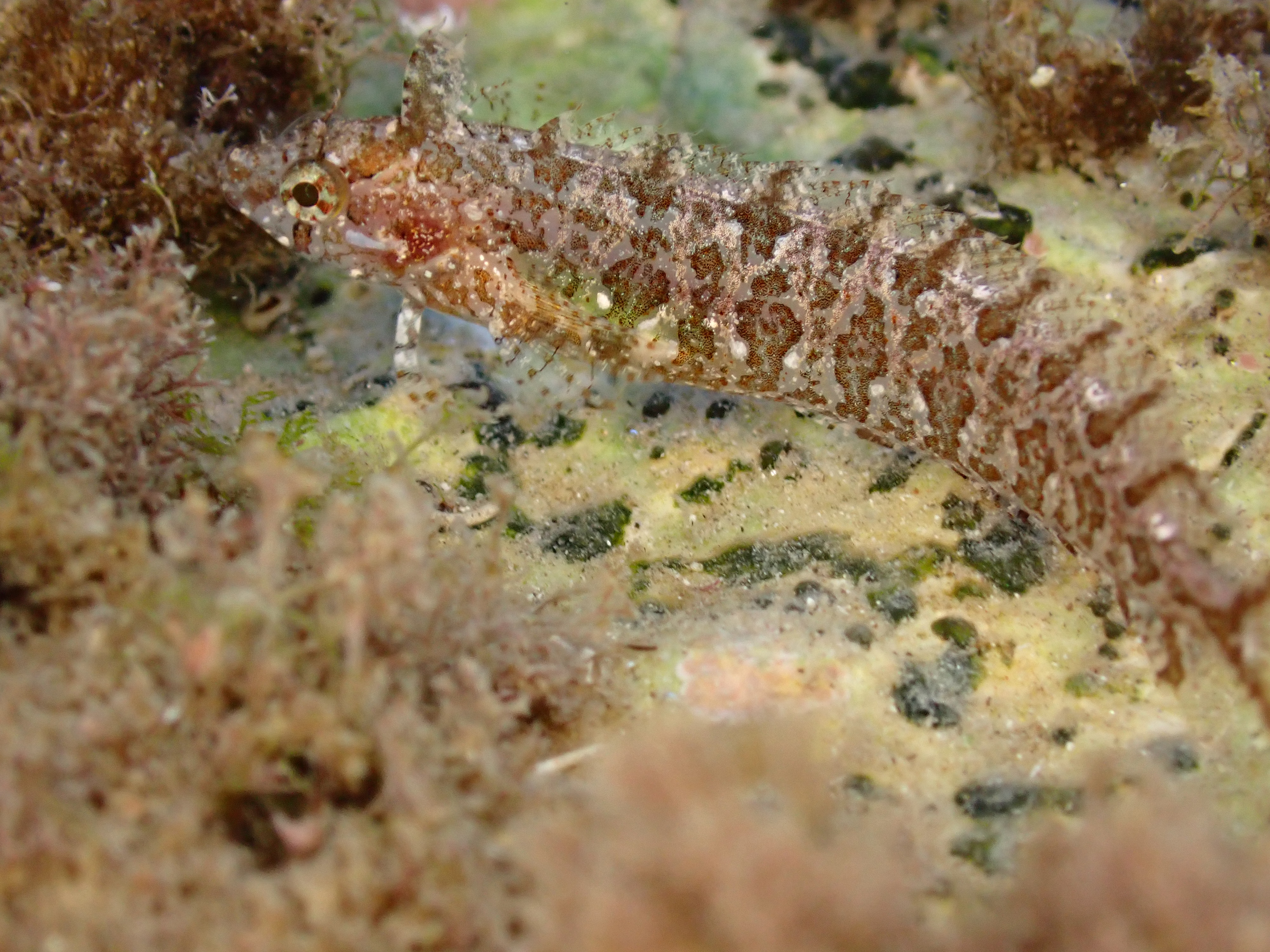
Whole individual

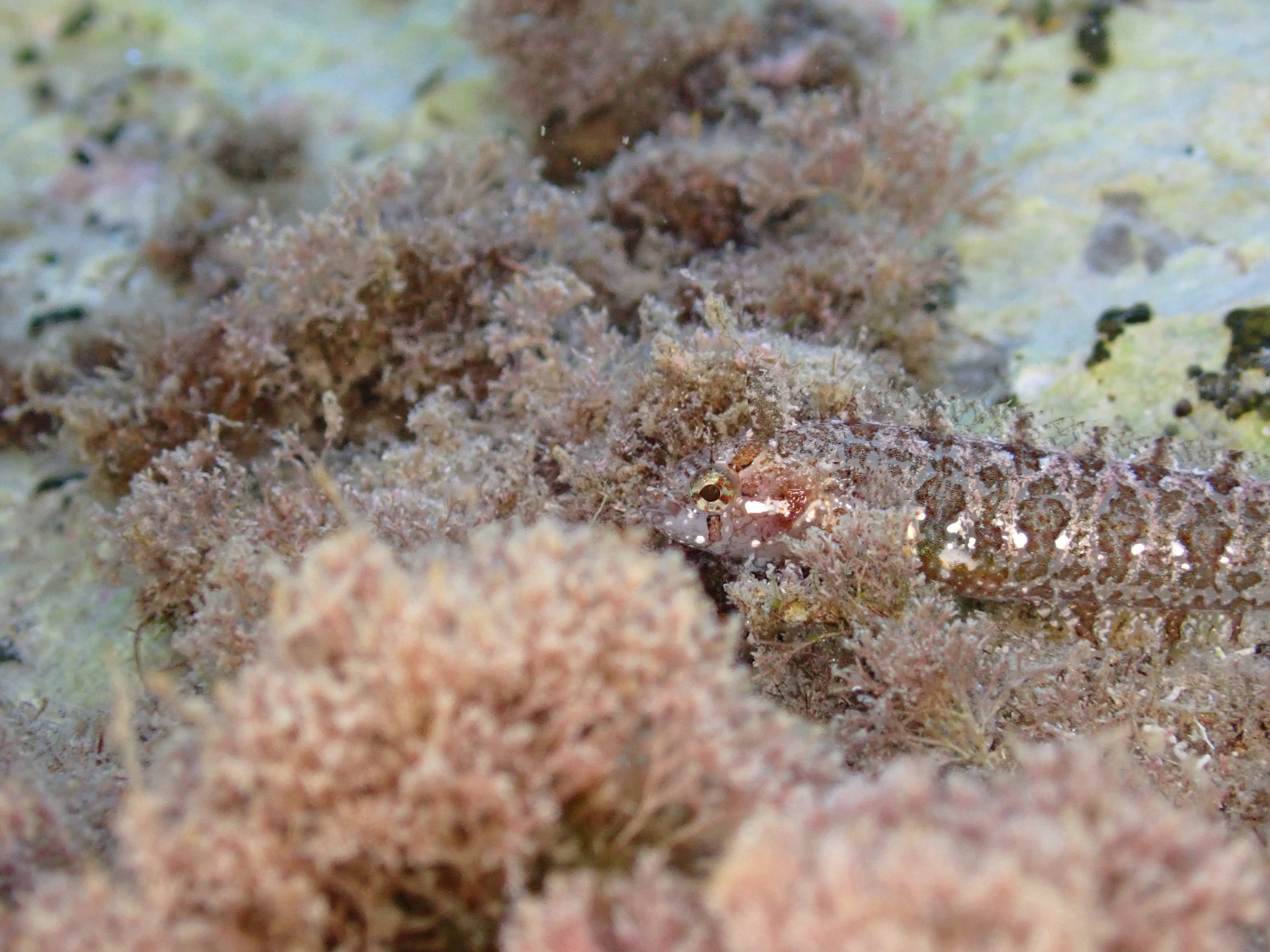
Mimicry with its environment

== Distribution ==
Clinitrachus argentatus is almost endemic tithe Mediterranean, occurring throughout that sea to the Bosphorous and the Sea of Marmara, its range extends through the Straits of Gibraltar into the eastern Atlantic Ocean along the coasts of southern Spain, southern Portugal and northern Morocco.

== Habitat and biology ==
Clinitrachus argentatus occurs in shallow water among dense algal growths. It can be found among rocks, in vegetation on harbour walls and dykes. The breeding season is May and June and the males guard egg masses laid by several females. It feeds mainly on small invertebrates, the juveniles mainly on copepods while the adults take a wider range of prey including amphipods, isopods, brachyurans and polychaetes.
