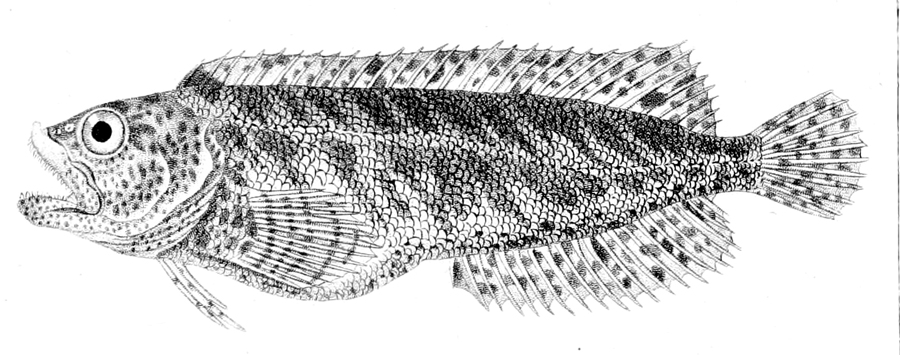

Conservation status
- Least Concern (IUCN 3.1)

Scientific classification
- Kingdom: Animalia
- Phylum: Chordata
- Class: Actinopterygii
- Order: Blenniiformes
- Family: Labrisomidae
- Genus: Auchenionchus
- Species: A. variolosus

Binomial name
- Auchenionchus variolosus (Valenciennes, 1836)

Synonyms
- Clinus variolosus Valenciennes, 1836

= Auchenionchus variolosus =

Species of fish

Auchenionchus variolosus is a species of labrisomid blenny endemic to the Pacific waters off the coast of Chile. While juveniles primarily consume amphipods, their diet shifts to decapods as the mature. This species can reach 18 cm (7.1 in) in total length.

== Biology ==
Study shows that the larvae of A. variolosus has a diet that is composed of mainly 15-19 prey items. These include early stages of copepods; the nauplii, metanauplii and copepodites, dinoflagellate cysts, cypris larvae, calyptopis, ostracods, the eggs of invertebrates and fishes. In terms of frequency, copepod nauplii are the most important prey item during the larval period. However, copepod nauplii are smaller in size and have low energy content therefore, with the passage of time and growth in the larvae of A.variolosus, copepodites gain importance in the diet instead of copepod nauplii. Also, the niche breadth of A. variolosus is independent of its larval size.
