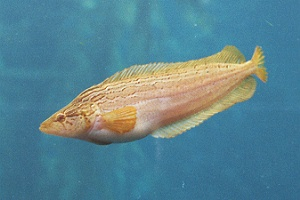
- Giant kelpfish, Heterostichus rostratus

Scientific classification
- Kingdom: Animalia
- Phylum: Chordata
- Class: Actinopterygii
- Clade: Ovalentaria
- Order: Blenniiformes
- Suborder: Blennioidei
- Family: Clinidae; Swainson, 1839

Genera
- See text

Synonyms
- Ophiclinidae

= Clinidae =

Clinidae Temporal range: Late Miocene–present

Family of fishes

Clinidae is a family of marine fish in the order Blenniiformes within the series Ovalentaria, part of the Percomorpha . Temperate blennies, the family ranges from the Atlantic, Pacific, and Indian Oceans, in both the Southern and Northern Hemispheres. The family contains about 86 species in 20 genera, the 60-cm-long giant kelpfish (Heterostichus rostratus) being the largest; most are far smaller.

With small cycloid scales, clinoid blennies may have a deep or slender build; some members of the family bear the name "snake blenny" and "eel blenny" for this reason. Dorsal spines outnumber soft rays; two spines are in the anal fin. Like many other blennies, clinids possess whisker-like structures on their heads called cirri.

The majority of species possesses rich, highly variable colouration in shades of reddish-brown to olive, often with cryptic patterns; this suits the lifestyle of clinid blennies, which frequent areas of dense weed or kelp. Generally staying within intertidal zones to depths around 40 m, some species are also found in tide pools. Eggs are deposited on kelp for the male to guard. Clinids feed primarily on small crustaceans and mollusks.

The name Clinidae derives from the Greek klinein meaning "sloping", a reference to the shape of the sphenoid bone. Many common names of Clinidae contain the head noun klipfish.

== Genera ==
These 26 genera are classified in the family Clinidae, including 81–84 species:

- Blennioclinus Gill, 1860 (2 species)
- Blennophis Swainson, 1839 (2 species)
- Cancelloxus J. L. B. SmithSmith, 1961 (3 species)
- Cirrhibarbis Valenciennes, 1836 (monotypic)
- Climacoporus Barnard, 1935 (monotypic)
- Clinitrachus Swainson, 1839 (monotypic)
- Clinoporus Barnard, 1927 (monotypic)
- Clinus Cuvier, 1816 (19–22 species)
- Cologrammus Gill, 1893 (monotypic)
- Cristiceps Valenciennes, 1836 (3 species)
- Ericentrus Gill, 1893 (monotypic)
- Fucomimus Smith, 1946 (monotypic)
- Gibbonsia Cooper, 1864 (3 species)
- Heteroclinus Castelnau, 1872 (16 species)
- Heterostichus Girard, 1854 (monotypic)
- Muraenoclinus Smith, 1946 (monotypic)
- Myxodes Cuvier, 1829 (3 species)
- Ophiclinops Whitley, 1932 (3 species)
- Ophiclinus Castelnau, 1872 (6 species)
- Pavoclinus Smith, 1946 (9 species)
- Peronedys Steindachner, 1883 (monotypic)
- Ribeiroclinus S. Y. Pinto, 1965 (monotypic)
- Smithichthys Hubbs, 1952 (monotypic)
- Springeratus S. C. Shen, 1971 (3 species)
- Sticharium Günther, 1867 (2 species)
- Xenopoclinus Smith, 1948 (2 species)

The only known fossil member of the family is †Clinitrachoides Bannikov, 1998 from the Late Miocene of Moldova, which appears to be closely related to Clinitrachus.

== See also ==
- List of fish common names
- List of fish families
