= Blacktail triplefin =

Blacktail triplefin is a common name for several species of fish in the threefin blenny family (Tripterygiidae) and may refer to:

- Enneapterygius bahasa, also known as the blacktail threefin, a species of threefin blenny known from reefs in the western Pacific Ocean
- Enneapterygius nigricauda, a species of triplefin blenny
- Enneapterygius similis, also known as black and red triplefin or masked threefin
- Helcogramma aquila

== See also ==
Japanese blacktail triplefin, Springerichthys bapturus
