= Enneapterygius clea =

Conservation status
- Least Concern (IUCN 3.1)

Scientific classification
- Kingdom: Animalia
- Phylum: Chordata
- Class: Actinopterygii
- Division: Teleostei
- Order: Blenniiformes
- Family: Tripterygiidae
- Genus: Enneapterygius
- Species: E. clea

Binomial name
- Enneapterygius clea Fricke, 1997

Species of fish

Enneapterygius clea, or Clea's triplefin, is a species of threefin blenny in the genus Enneapterygius, described by German ichthyologist Ronald Fricke in 1997. It is endemic to Queensland, Australia.

== Etymology ==
Enneapterygius clea was described by Ronald Fricke in 1997, from a male holotype (AMS I.22600-056) and 34 paratype specimens. He gave the blenny its species epithet, "clea", and its common name in honour of his daughter Clea, then seven years old.

== Description ==
Fricke described Enneapterygius clea as a medium-sized member of the Enneapterygius hemimelas species group, and considered it to be most closely related to the blacktail triplefin (Enneapterygius bahasa) and the redtail triplefin (Enneapterygius rubicauda), both from the western Pacific Ocean. Clea's triplefins have yellow-orange bodies with red streaks, orange vertical fins and blue-gray eyes. Males have black heads and tails, while the females do not share this feature. Male Clea's triplefins can reach a maximum length of 3.2 centimetres.

== Distribution ==
The Clea's triplefin is a tropical blenny, endemic to reefs around Queensland, Australia, in the western central Pacific Ocean. It swims at a depth range of 4–24 metres.
