= Enneapterygius flavoccipitis =

Conservation status
- Least Concern (IUCN 3.1)

Scientific classification
- Kingdom: Animalia
- Phylum: Chordata
- Class: Actinopterygii
- Division: Teleostei
- Order: Blenniiformes
- Family: Tripterygiidae
- Genus: Enneapterygius
- Species: E. flavoccipitis

Binomial name
- Enneapterygius flavoccipitis Shen, 1994

Synonyms
- Enneapterygius bichrous Fricke, 1994

Species of fish

Enneapterygius flavoccipitis, the yellownape triplefin or northern bicoloured triplefin, in Australia, is a species of threefin blenny in the genus Enneapterygius.

== Etymology ==
The species was originally described by German ichthyologist Ronald Fricke in 1994, as Enneapterygius 1994. It was later identified by Hoese et al. in 2006 as a synonym of E. flavoccipitis, described by S.C. Shen in 1994, less than 6 weeks prior to Fricke's description of E. bichrous.

== Description ==
The yellownape triplefin is described as a medium-sized species in the Enneapterygius flavoccipitis species group, which also includes the black triplefin (Enneapterygius niger) and William's triplefin (Enneapterygius williamsi). Males can reach a maximum length of 2.7 centimetres (1.06 inches).

== Distribution ==
The yellownape triplefin inhabits coral reefs, coral reef lagoons, and intertidal rock pools in Temperate waters in the western central Pacific Ocean, and has been described from the Ryukyu Islands, Taiwan, the Philippines, Timor Sea, Australia, New Caledonia, Papua New Guinea, Vanuatu, and Indonesia. It has recorded swimming at a depth range of 0–22 metres (0-72.2 feet).
