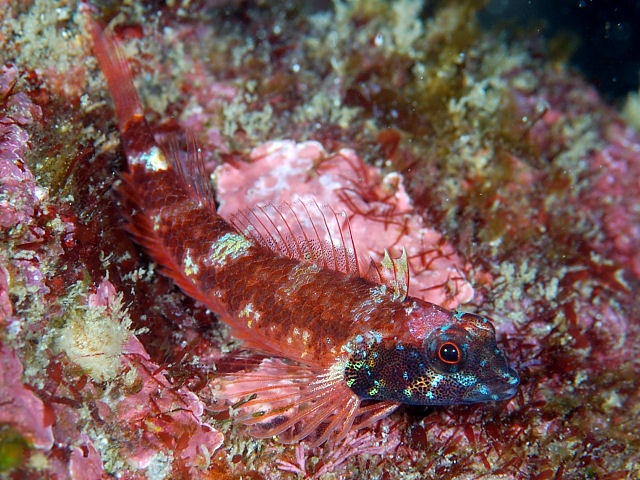

Scientific classification
- Kingdom: Animalia
- Phylum: Chordata
- Class: Actinopterygii
- Order: Blenniiformes
- Family: Tripterygiidae
- Genus: Enneapterygius
- Species: E. phoenicosoma

Binomial name
- Enneapterygius phoenicosoma Motomura, R. Ota & Meguro, 2015

= Enneapterygius phoenicosoma =

Species of fish

Enneapterygius phoenicosoma is a species of triplefin blenny from the western pacific where it has been recorded from southern Japan, the Caroline Islands and Vanuatu. The breeding males are similar in colour and pattern to those of Enneapterygius atriceps but this species is generally larger (up to 37.2 millimetres (1.46 in) standard length) has a simple nasal tentacle and different meristic counts.
