= Minute triplefin =

Minute triplefin is a common name for several fishes and may refer to:

- Enneapterygius minutus
- Enneapterygius philippinus
