= Enneapterygius bahasa =

Conservation status
- Least Concern (IUCN 3.1)

Scientific classification
- Kingdom: Animalia
- Phylum: Chordata
- Class: Actinopterygii
- Division: Teleostei
- Order: Blenniiformes
- Family: Tripterygiidae
- Genus: Enneapterygius
- Species: E. bahasa

Binomial name
- Enneapterygius bahasa Fricke, 1997

Species of fish

Enneapterygius bahasa, blacktail triplefin, also known as the blacktail threefin in Australia, is a species of threefin blenny in the genus Enneapterygius. It was described by German ichthyologist Ronald Fricke in 1997, and earns its common name from its black caudal fins. It is known from reefs in the western Pacific Ocean.

== Etymology ==
The blacktail triplefin was described by Ronald Fricke in 1997, from a male holotype (USNM 259168) collected from Queensland, Australia, and 77 paratype specimens from its other known locale. He gave it the species name bahasa, referring to the official Indonesian language, often called "Bahasa Indonesia".

== Description ==
Male blacktail triplefins can reach a maximum length of 3.2 centimetres (1.3 in). Fricke described the blacktail triplefin as being a medium-sized member of the "Enneapterygius hemimelas" species group, being most closely related to the Australian Clea's triplefin (E. clea) and the Redtail triplefin (E. rubicauda) from the western Pacific. The bodies of the blennies are predominantly reddish in colour, with white spots on the bodies and white streaks around the eyes; the males have blackish faces and tails (from which the common name is derived), a trait which is not shared with the females. On average, the females have stouter bodies, shorter snouts and higher vertical fins than the males.

== Distribution ==
It is a tropical blenny found mainly in the flats and crests of reefs in the western Pacific Ocean, and swims at depths ranging from 0–18 metres (0–59 ft). It has been recorded from Japan, Taiwan, Indonesia, the Philippines, Papua New Guinea, Guam, Palau, and Australia.
