= Enneapterygius leucopunctatus =

Conservation status
- Near Threatened (IUCN 3.1)

Scientific classification
- Kingdom: Animalia
- Phylum: Chordata
- Class: Actinopterygii
- Order: Blenniiformes
- Family: Tripterygiidae
- Genus: Enneapterygius
- Species: E. leucopunctatus

Binomial name
- Enneapterygius leucopunctatus Shen, 1994

Species of fish

Enneapterygius leucopunctatus is a species of triplefin blenny in the genus Enneapterygius. It was described by Shih-Chieh Shen in 1994. It was thought to be endemic to Taiwan where it occurs on the southern, eastern and northern coasts but it has also been recorded from southern Japan. The IUCN lis it as Near Threatened because it has a small range and much of its habitat is threatened by development.
