= Enneapterygius rhothion =

Conservation status
- Least Concern (IUCN 3.1)

Scientific classification
- Kingdom: Animalia
- Phylum: Chordata
- Class: Actinopterygii
- Order: Blenniiformes
- Family: Tripterygiidae
- Genus: Enneapterygius
- Species: E. rhothion

Binomial name
- Enneapterygius rhothion Fricke, 1997

Species of fish

Enneapterygius rhothion, the New Caledonian blackhead surf triplefin or surf triplefin, is a species of triplefin blenny in the genus Enneapterygius. It was described by Ronald Fricke in 1997. This species occurs in New Caledonia and Vanuatu.
