= UCLA (disambiguation) =

UCLA is the University of California, Los Angeles, a public research university in Los Angeles, California, United States.

UCLA or Ucla may also refer to:

- Universidad Centroccidental Lisandro Alvarado, a Venezuelan public university
- Ucla (fish), a genus of fishes
- Uniform Collaborative Law Act, a uniform law drafted by the National Conference of Commissioners on Uniform State Laws
- Unilaterally Controlled Latino Assets, a destabilization group through CIA assets

== See also ==
- ACLU
- ULCA (disambiguation)
