= Enneapterygius pallidoserialis =

Conservation status
- Least Concern (IUCN 3.1)

Scientific classification
- Kingdom: Animalia
- Phylum: Chordata
- Class: Actinopterygii
- Order: Blenniiformes
- Family: Tripterygiidae
- Genus: Enneapterygius
- Species: E. pallidoserialis

Binomial name
- Enneapterygius pallidoserialis Fricke, 1997

Species of fish

Enneapterygius pallidoserialis, the pale white-spotted triplefin, is a species of triplefin blenny in the genus Enneapterygius. It was described by Ronald Fricke in 1997. This species occurs in the western Pacific Ocean where it has been recorded from Indonesia, Japan, Malaysia, the Federated States of Micronesia, Philippines, Solomon Islands; Taiwan, Vanuatu and Vietnam. It occurs along rocky shorelines to depths of 8 metres (26 ft).
