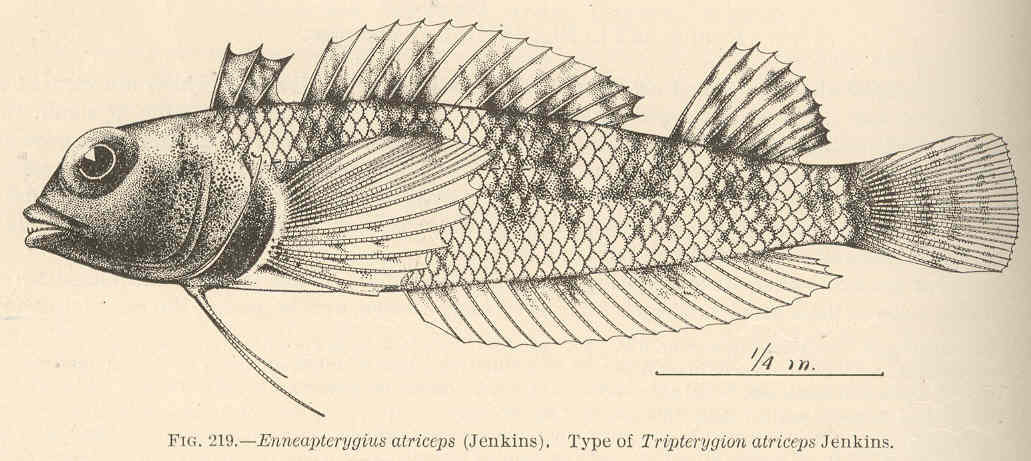
- Illustration
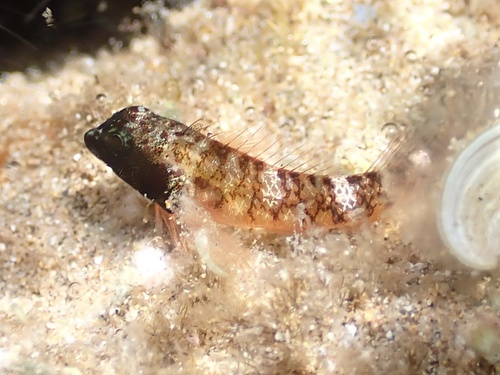
- Live animal with dark head coloring

Conservation status
- Least Concern (IUCN 3.1)

Scientific classification
- Kingdom: Animalia
- Phylum: Chordata
- Class: Actinopterygii
- Division: Teleostei
- Order: Blenniiformes
- Family: Tripterygiidae
- Genus: Enneapterygius
- Species: E. atriceps

Binomial name
- Enneapterygius atriceps (Jenkins, 1903)

Synonyms
- Tripterygium atriceps Jenkins, 1903

= Hawaiian blackhead triplefin =

Species of fish

The Hawaiian blackhead triplefin (Enneapterygius atriceps), also known as the Hawaiian triplefin in Hawaii, is a species of triplefin blenny in the genus Enneapterygius. It is a tropical blenny found in coral reefs in the Pacific Ocean, from the Hawaiian Islands, French Frigate Shoals, Laysan Island, and Midway Atoll. Blennies in this species swim at a depth range of 1–23 metres, and inhabit dead coral and rock.

It was originally described by O.P. Jenkins in 1903, as a species of Tripterygion, but was reassigned to Enneapterygius by R. Fricke in 1997.

== Description ==
The Hawaiian blackhead triplefin is considered part of the Enneapterygius hemimelas species group. It is considered a small or medium member of the group, with males reaching a maximum length of 2.6 centimetres. Males can be distinguished from females by their dark head colouring.
