= Enneapterygius signicauda =

Conservation status
- Least Concern (IUCN 3.1)

Scientific classification
- Kingdom: Animalia
- Phylum: Chordata
- Class: Actinopterygii
- Order: Blenniiformes
- Family: Tripterygiidae
- Genus: Enneapterygius
- Species: E. signicauda

Binomial name
- Enneapterygius signicauda Fricke, 1997

Species of fish

Enneapterygius signicauda, known commonly as the flagtail triplefin, is a species of triplefin blenny in the genus Enneapterygius. It was described by Ronald Fricke in 1997. This species occurs in the western Pacific Ocean and has been recorded from American Samoa, southern Tonga, and Vanuatu, as well as southern Japan.
