= Acanthanectes rufus =

Conservation status
- Least Concern (IUCN 3.1)

Scientific classification
- Kingdom: Animalia
- Phylum: Chordata
- Class: Actinopterygii
- Order: Blenniiformes
- Family: Tripterygiidae
- Genus: Acanthanectes
- Species: A. rufus

Binomial name
- Acanthanectes rufus Holleman & Buxton, 1993

Species of fish

Acanthanectes rufus is a species of triplefin blenny. It was described by Holleman and Buxton, in 1993. It has been recorded from Tsitsikamma National Park to Cape Recife in South Africa.
