= Enneapterygius ventermaculus =

Conservation status
- Least Concern (IUCN 3.1)

Scientific classification
- Kingdom: Animalia
- Phylum: Chordata
- Class: Actinopterygii
- Order: Blenniiformes
- Family: Tripterygiidae
- Genus: Enneapterygius
- Species: E. ventermaculus

Binomial name
- Enneapterygius ventermaculus Holleman, 1982

Species of fish

Enneapterygius ventermaculus, the blotched triplefin or Pakistan triplefin, is a species of triplefin blenny in the genus Enneapterygius. It was described by Wouter Holleman in 1982.

== Description ==
The blotched triplefins are about 4 cm long. The males have black heads and yellow fins. The bodies are patterned with black and white blotches. There are 14 to 16 dorsal spines with 8 to 10 soft dorsal rays. There is an anal spine and 17 to 20 anal soft rays.

== Distribution ==
The blotched triplefin is found in the Western Indian Ocean from the coast of Pakistan to the Durban region of South Africa.

== Biology ==
Little information is available in the literature about this particular species of triplefin blenny. There are several other species in the family that give hints to their likely behavior and life style. Triplefin blennies are small, large-eyed fish that live in shallow coastal waters around the world. They are residents of rocky shore communities

Males are territorial and attract females to their home ranges. In two species, males have been observed to spawn parasitically on females in other males' territories and it is possible this behavior will eventually be seen in the blotched triplefin as well.
