= Enneapterygius trisignatus =

Conservation status
- Least Concern (IUCN 3.1)

Scientific classification
- Kingdom: Animalia
- Phylum: Chordata
- Class: Actinopterygii
- Order: Blenniiformes
- Family: Tripterygiidae
- Genus: Enneapterygius
- Species: E. trisignatus

Binomial name
- Enneapterygius trisignatus Fricke, 2001

Species of fish

Enneapterygius trisignatus is a species of triplefin blenny in the genus Enneapterygius. It was described by Ronald Fricke in 2001. It is found off northern New Caledonia.
