= Enneapterygius miyakensis =

Conservation status
- Least Concern (IUCN 3.1)

Scientific classification
- Kingdom: Animalia
- Phylum: Chordata
- Class: Actinopterygii
- Order: Blenniiformes
- Family: Tripterygiidae
- Genus: Enneapterygius
- Species: E. miyakensis

Binomial name
- Enneapterygius miyakensis Fricke, 1987

Species of fish

Enneapterygius miyakensis, known commonly as the Izu Islands triplefin, is a species of triplefin blenny in the genus Enneapterygius. It was described by the German ichthyologist Ronald Fricke in 1987. It is only known to occur in the Izu Islands off Japan.
