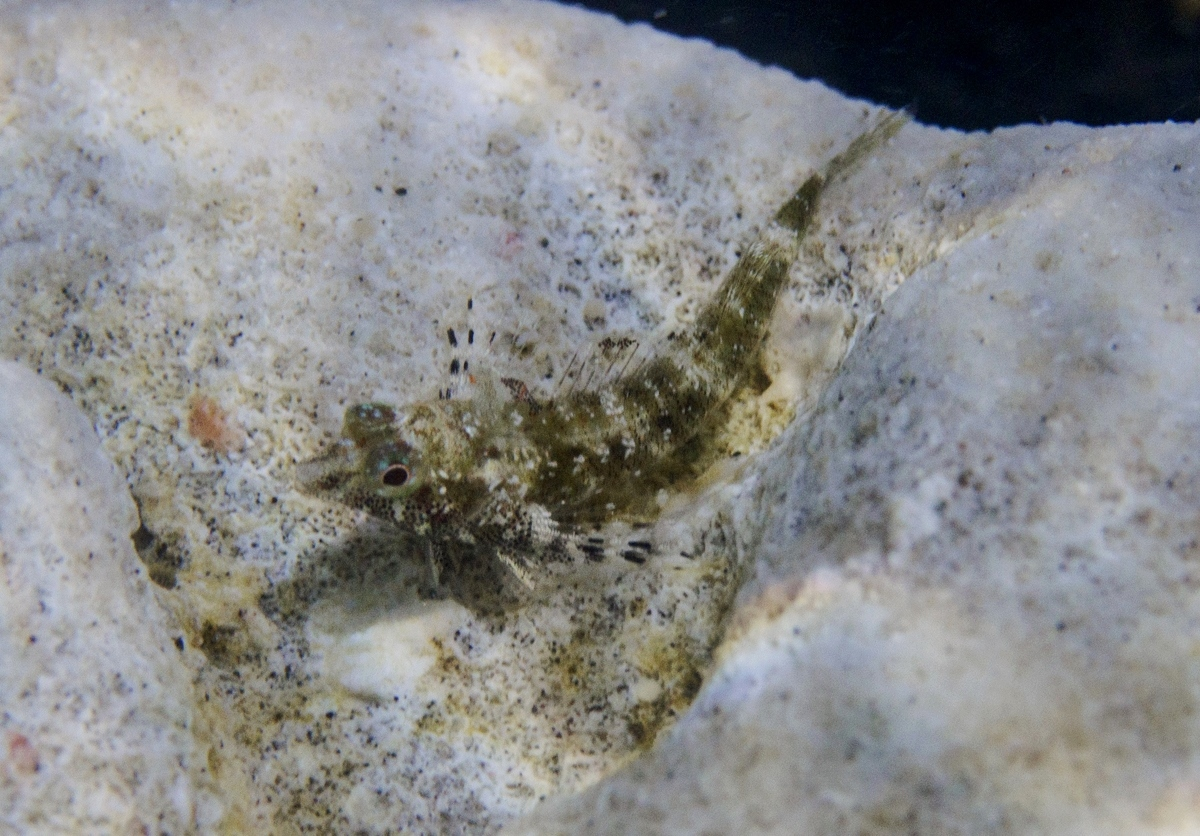

Conservation status
- Least Concern (IUCN 3.1)

Scientific classification
- Kingdom: Animalia
- Phylum: Chordata
- Class: Actinopterygii
- Order: Blenniiformes
- Family: Tripterygiidae
- Genus: Enneapterygius
- Species: E. tutuilae

Binomial name
- Enneapterygius tutuilae Jordan & Seale, 1906

= Enneapterygius tutuilae =

Species of fish

Enneapterygius tutuilae, known commonly as the high-hat triplefin or rosy cheek threefin, is a species of triplefin blenny in the genus Enneapterygius. It was described by David Starr Jordan and Alvin Seale in 1906. This species occurs from the eastern Indian Ocean around the Cocos (Keeling) Islands east to French Polynesia. Its specific name refers to the Samoan island of Tutuila where the type was collected.
