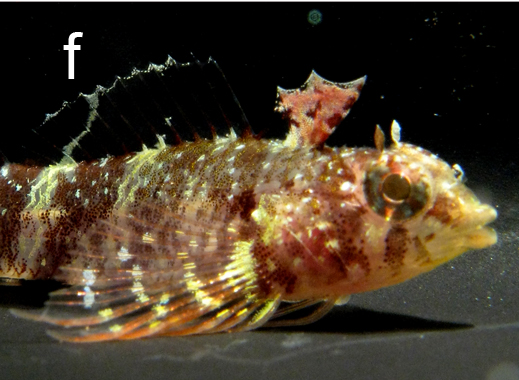

Conservation status
- Least Concern (IUCN 3.1)

Scientific classification
- Kingdom: Animalia
- Phylum: Chordata
- Class: Actinopterygii
- Order: Blenniiformes
- Family: Tripterygiidae
- Genus: Enneapterygius
- Species: E. destai

Binomial name
- Enneapterygius destai Clark, 1980

= Enneapterygius destai =

Species of fish

Enneapterygius destai under blue illumination, observed through a red filter (ca. 0:37).

Enneapterygius destai is a species of triplefin blenny which is endemic to the Red Sea where it is found at depths of 2 to 20 metres (6.6 to 65.6 ft) in bays and lagoons which have dense populations of coral. Within these it is normally associated with corals in the genus Porites and can be found in crevices near these corals or on the vertical faces made up of them. The specific name honours the Ethiopian admiral Prince Alexander Desta (1934–1974) who was executed when the Derg took power in Ethiopia.
