= Enneapterygius obscurus =

Conservation status
- Least Concern (IUCN 3.1)

Scientific classification
- Kingdom: Animalia
- Phylum: Chordata
- Class: Actinopterygii
- Order: Blenniiformes
- Family: Tripterygiidae
- Genus: Enneapterygius
- Species: E. obscurus

Binomial name
- Enneapterygius obscurus Clark, 1980

Species of fish

Enneapterygius obscurus is a species of triplefin blenny in the genus Enneapterygius. It was described by Eugenie Clark in 1980. It is found in the Red Sea but the finding of a specimen at Malindi in Kenya suggests it may have a wider distribution.
