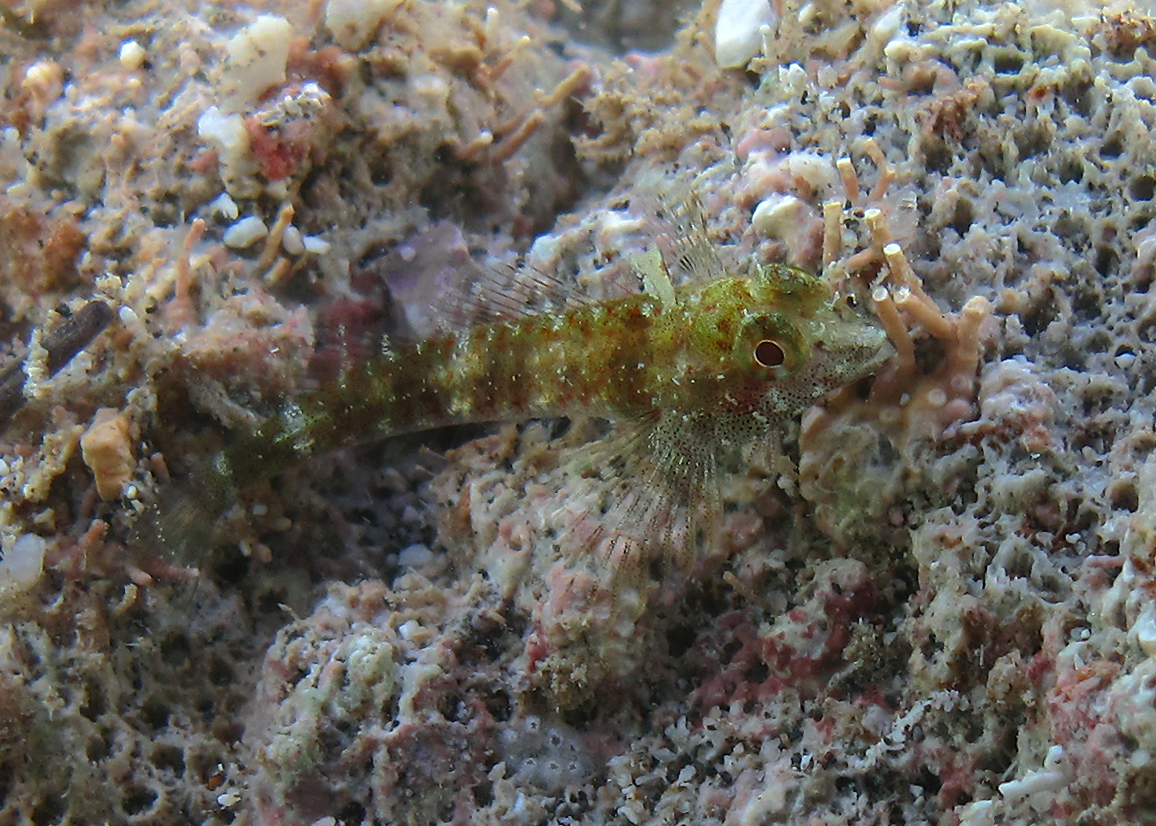

Conservation status
- Least Concern (IUCN 3.1)

Scientific classification
- Kingdom: Animalia
- Phylum: Chordata
- Class: Actinopterygii
- Division: Teleostei
- Order: Blenniiformes
- Family: Tripterygiidae
- Genus: Enneapterygius
- Species: E. abeli

Binomial name
- Enneapterygius abeli (Klausewitz, 1960)

Synonyms
- Tripterygion abeli Klausewitz, 1960; Helcogramma abeli (Klausewitz, 1960)

= Yellow triplefin =

Species of fish

The yellow triplefin (Enneapterygius abeli), also known as the Abel's triplefin in South Africa, is a species of triplefin in the genus Enneapterygius. Males in this species can reach a maximum length of 2.5 centimetres. The blennies are generally bright yellow in colour, and males have black heads. They feed mostly on benthic invertebrates.

In 1960, Wolfgang Klausewitz described the species, originally assigning it to the genus Tripterygion under "T. abeli". It was later reassigned to Helcogramma, before being reassigned to Enneapterygius by W. Holleman in 2005.

The fish is named in honor of Austrian biologist Erich F. Abel (1919-1995) of the University of Vienna, who worked on the ecology and ethology of fishes of the Mediterranean and the Red Sea, and who donated the type specimens from the Red Sea to the Senckenberg Museum.

== Distribution ==
The yellow triplefin is a tropical blenny found in coral reefs located in the western Indian Ocean; in the Red Sea, the East African coast, KwaZulu-Natal, Mauritius, Seychelles, Comoros and St. Brandon Shoals. Due to a lack of major threats to the species, and its wide distribution, the IUCN redlist ranked it as "Least Concern" in 2009.
