= Chatham deep-water triplefin =

Conservation status
- Least Concern (IUCN 3.1)

Scientific classification
- Kingdom: Animalia
- Phylum: Chordata
- Class: Actinopterygii
- Order: Blenniiformes
- Family: Tripterygiidae
- Genus: Matanui
- Species: M. bathytaton

Binomial name
- Matanui bathytaton (Hardy, 1989)

Synonyms
- Forsterygion bathytaton Hardy, 1989

Species of fish

The Chatham deep-water triplefin (Matanui bathytaton) is a species of triplefin blenny in the genus Matanui. It was described by Graham S. Hardy in 1989. This species occurs at depths between 12 and 550 metres (39 and 1,804 ft) on waters off New Zealand including the Chatham Rise, southeast South Island, Auckland Islands, Antipodes Islands and Stewart Island.
