= Enneapterygius hollemani =

Conservation status
- Least Concern (IUCN 3.1)

Scientific classification
- Kingdom: Animalia
- Phylum: Chordata
- Class: Actinopterygii
- Order: Blenniiformes
- Family: Tripterygiidae
- Genus: Enneapterygius
- Species: E. hollemani

Binomial name
- Enneapterygius hollemani Randall, 1995

Species of fish

Enneapterygius hollemani, or Holleman's triplefin, is a species of triplefin blenny in the genus Enneapterygius. It is found only on the central and southern coasts of Oman. It was described by John E. Randall in 1995 and was named in honour of the ichthyologist Wouter Holleman of the South African Institute for Aquatic Biodiversity.
