= Enneapterygius qirmiz =

Conservation status
- Least Concern (IUCN 3.1)

Scientific classification
- Kingdom: Animalia
- Phylum: Chordata
- Class: Actinopterygii
- Order: Blenniiformes
- Family: Tripterygiidae
- Genus: Enneapterygius
- Species: E. qirmiz

Binomial name
- Enneapterygius qirmiz Holleman & Bogorodsky, 2012

Species of fish

Enneapterygius qirmiz is a species of triplefin blenny in the genus Enneapterygius. It was described by Wouter Holleman and Sergey V. Bogorodsky in 2012. This species is found in the Red Sea from Ras Mohammed in the Gulf of Aqaba to Yemen.
