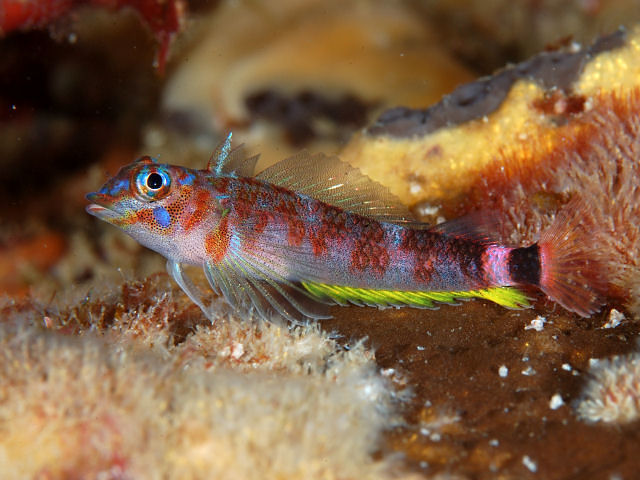

Conservation status
- Least Concern (IUCN 3.1)

Scientific classification
- Kingdom: Animalia
- Phylum: Chordata
- Class: Actinopterygii
- Order: Blenniiformes
- Family: Tripterygiidae
- Genus: Enneapterygius
- Species: E. senoui

Binomial name
- Enneapterygius senoui Motomura, Harazaki & Hardy, 2005

= Enneapterygius senoui =

Species of fish

Enneapterygius senoui is a species of triplefin blenny in the genus Enneapterygius. It was described by Hiroyuki Motomura, Shigeru Harazaki and Graham S. Hardy in 2005. The specific name honours Hiroshi Senou of the Kanagawa Prefectural Museum of Natural History, the collector of the holotype and four of the paratypes, making them available for study by the authors. It is found in the western Pacific Ocean off the Izu Islands and the Ogasawara Islands off southern Japan.
