= Enneapterygius paucifasciatus =

Conservation status
- Least Concern (IUCN 3.1)

Scientific classification
- Kingdom: Animalia
- Phylum: Chordata
- Class: Actinopterygii
- Order: Blenniiformes
- Family: Tripterygiidae
- Genus: Enneapterygius
- Species: E. paucifasciatus

Binomial name
- Enneapterygius paucifasciatus Fricke, 1994

Species of fish

Enneapterygius paucifasciatus, the New Caledonian striped triplefin or reticulate triplefin, is a species of triplefin blenny in the genus Enneapterygius. It was described by Ronald Fricke in 1994.
