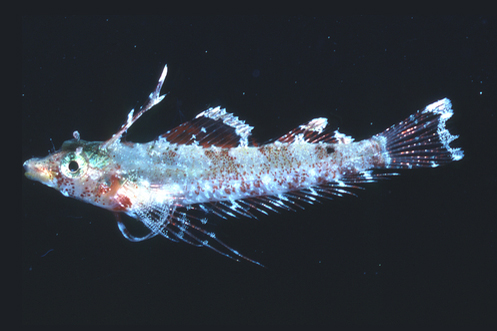

Conservation status
- Least Concern (IUCN 3.1)

Scientific classification
- Kingdom: Animalia
- Phylum: Chordata
- Class: Actinopterygii
- Order: Blenniiformes
- Family: Tripterygiidae
- Genus: Enneapterygius
- Species: E. mirabilis

Binomial name
- Enneapterygius mirabilis Fricke, 1994

= Enneapterygius mirabilis =

Species of fish

Enneapterygius mirabilis, the miracle triplefin, is a species of triplefin blenny in the genus Enneapterygius. It was described by Ronald Fricke in 1994 who gave it the specific name mirabilis, meaning "admirable", because its notable large pectoral fins and first dorsal fin were pretty.
