= Enneapterygius fasciatus =

Conservation status
- Least Concern (IUCN 3.1)

Scientific classification
- Kingdom: Animalia
- Phylum: Chordata
- Class: Actinopterygii
- Order: Blenniiformes
- Family: Tripterygiidae
- Genus: Enneapterygius
- Species: E. fasciatus

Binomial name
- Enneapterygius fasciatus (Weber, 1909)

Synonyms
- Tripterygium fasciatum Weber, 1909; Tripterygion fasciatum (Weber, 1909)

Species of fish

Enneapterygius fasciatus, known commonly as the tiny threefin or the banded triplefin, is a species of triplefin blenny in the genus Enneapterygius. It was originally described by Weber in 1909, under the name Tripterygium fasciatum, which was later renamed Tripterygion fasciatum. It is a tropical blenny found in coral reefs in the Indian and western Pacific Oceans, and has been described from East Africa to Papua New Guinea, the Solomon Islands, and Taiwan. E. fasciatus has been recorded swimming at a depth range of 1–25 metres (3.3–82 ft). Male E. fasciatus can reach a maximum length of 3 centimetres.
