= Northern yellow-black triplefin =

Conservation status
- Least Concern (IUCN 3.1)

Scientific classification
- Kingdom: Animalia
- Phylum: Chordata
- Class: Actinopterygii
- Division: Teleostei
- Order: Blenniiformes
- Family: Tripterygiidae
- Genus: Enneapterygius
- Species: E. gracilis

Binomial name
- Enneapterygius gracilis Fricke, 1994

Species of fish

The northern yellow-black triplefin (Enneapterygius gracilis), also known as the northern Australian yellow-black triplefin, is a species of triplefin blenny in the genus Enneapterygius. It was described by German Ichthyologist Ronald Fricke in 1994. It is a tropical blenny, endemic to northern Australia, in the western Pacific and southeastern Indian Oceans. It is a non-migratory species which dwells in shallow tidal pools on coralline rock and in seagrass, and has been recorded swimming at a depth range of 0–15 m (0–50 ft). Male northern yellow-black triplefins can reach a maximum length of 2.8 centimetres (1.06 inches).
