= Enneapterygius rhabdotus =

Conservation status
- Least Concern (IUCN 3.1)

Scientific classification
- Kingdom: Animalia
- Phylum: Chordata
- Class: Actinopterygii
- Order: Blenniiformes
- Family: Tripterygiidae
- Genus: Enneapterygius
- Species: E. rhabdotus

Binomial name
- Enneapterygius rhabdotus Fricke, 1994

Species of fish

Enneapterygius rhabdotus, the umpire triplefin or South Pacific striped triplefin, is a species of triplefin blenny in the genus Enneapterygius. It was described by Ronald Fricke in 1994. This species occurs in the western central Pacific Ocean the Izu Peninsula in Japan, Taiwan, Batanes and Palawan in the northern Philippines, the Gulf of Thailand, Palau, and most of Melanesia east to the Pitcairn Islands.
