= Enneapterygius pallidus =

Conservation status
- Least Concern (IUCN 3.1)

Scientific classification
- Kingdom: Animalia
- Phylum: Chordata
- Class: Actinopterygii
- Order: Blenniiformes
- Family: Tripterygiidae
- Genus: Enneapterygius
- Species: E. pallidus

Binomial name
- Enneapterygius pallidus Clark, 1980

Species of fish

Enneapterygius pallidus is a species of triplefin blenny from the Red Sea where it is found at depths of 0 to 5 metres (0 to 16 ft) and is associated with reefs. It grows to a maximum recorded length of 3 centimetres (1.2 in).
