= Enneapterygius ziegleri =

Conservation status
- Least Concern (IUCN 3.1)

Scientific classification
- Kingdom: Animalia
- Phylum: Chordata
- Class: Actinopterygii
- Order: Blenniiformes
- Family: Tripterygiidae
- Genus: Enneapterygius
- Species: E. ziegleri

Binomial name
- Enneapterygius ziegleri Fricke, 1994

Species of fish

Enneapterygius ziegleri, known commonly as the Ziegler's triplefin, is a species of triplefin blenny in the genus Enneapterygius. It was described by Ronald Fricke in 1994. Its specific name honours Bernhard Ziegler (1929–2013), a paleontologist and Director of the State Museum of Natural History in Stuttgart, Germany. This species occurs in the Timor Sea of Indonesia and East Timor and in the Philippines.
