= Enneapterygius elaine =

Conservation status
- Least Concern (IUCN 3.1)

Scientific classification
- Kingdom: Animalia
- Phylum: Chordata
- Class: Actinopterygii
- Division: Teleostei
- Order: Blenniiformes
- Family: Tripterygiidae
- Genus: Enneapterygius
- Species: E. elaine

Binomial name
- Enneapterygius elaine Holleman, 2005

Species of fish

Enneapterygius elaine is a species of triplefin blenny in the genus Enneapterygius. It was described by Wouter Holleman in 2005. It is a tropical blenny known from Rodrigues Island, in the western Indian Ocean. Male Enneapterygius elaine can reach a maximum length of 2.3 centimetres. The specific name honours Elaine Heemstra of the Institute for Aquatic Biodiversity in Grahamstown who provided illustrations of reef fish for Holleman, including some in the paper in which this species was described.
