= Enneapterygius shaoi =

Conservation status
- Least Concern (IUCN 3.1)

Scientific classification
- Kingdom: Animalia
- Phylum: Chordata
- Class: Actinopterygii
- Order: Blenniiformes
- Family: Tripterygiidae
- Genus: Enneapterygius
- Species: E. shaoi

Binomial name
- Enneapterygius shaoi M. C. Chiang & I. S. Chen, 2008

Species of fish

Enneapterygius shaoi is a species of triplefin blenny in the genus Enneapterygius. It was described by Chiang Min-Chia and Chen I-Shiung in 2008. The specific name honours the ichthyologist and marine ecologist Kwang-Tsao Shao of the Biodiversity Research Center at the Academia Sinica in Taiwan. It occurs off the eastern and southern coast of Taiwan.
