= Deepwater triplefin =

Conservation status
- Least Concern (IUCN 3.1)

Scientific classification
- Kingdom: Animalia
- Phylum: Chordata
- Class: Actinopterygii
- Order: Blenniiformes
- Family: Tripterygiidae
- Genus: Matanui
- Species: M. profundum

Binomial name
- Matanui profundum (Fricke & Roberts, 1994)

Synonyms
- Forsterygion profundum Fricke & Roberts, 1994

Species of fish

The deepwater triplefin (Matanui profundum) is a species of triplefin blenny in the genus Matanui. It was described by Ronald Fricke and Clive D. Roberts in 1994. This species is found around the North Island, Auckland Islands and Chatham Islands at depths between 9 and 550 metres (30 and 1,804 ft).
