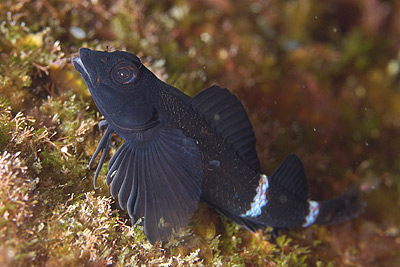

Scientific classification
- Kingdom: Animalia
- Phylum: Chordata
- Class: Actinopterygii
- Order: Blenniiformes
- Family: Tripterygiidae
- Genus: Enneapterygius
- Species: E. etheostomus

Binomial name
- Enneapterygius etheostomus (Jordan & Snyder, 1902)

Synonyms
- Tripterygium etheostoma Jordan & Snyder, 1902; Rosenblatella etheostomus (Jordan & Snyder, 1902)

= Enneapterygius etheostomus =

Species of fish

Enneapterygius etheostomus is a species of triplefin blenny in the genus Enneapterygius. It is a temperate blenny known to inhabit rocky shores in the northwestern Pacific Ocean, and swims at a depth range of 0–21 metres (0-68 feet) It has been described from Japan, China, Korea, Hong Kong, Taiwan, and Vietnam. Male E. etheostomus can reach a maximum length of 5.5 centimetres (2.1in) Both juveniles and adults of the species are known to feed on benthic algae.

E. etheostomus was originally described as Tripterygium etheostoma by David Starr Jordan and J.O. Snyder in 1902, and was later renamed Rosenblatella etheostomus by H. Masuda et al., in 1984. It was reassigned to Enneapterygius by Ronald Fricke in 1997.
