= Enneapterygius hsiojenae =

Conservation status
- Least Concern (IUCN 3.1)

Scientific classification
- Kingdom: Animalia
- Phylum: Chordata
- Class: Actinopterygii
- Order: Blenniiformes
- Family: Tripterygiidae
- Genus: Enneapterygius
- Species: E. hsiojenae

Binomial name
- Enneapterygius hsiojenae Shen, 1994

Species of fish

Enneapterygius hsiojenae is a species of triplefin blenny in the genus Enneapterygius. It was described by Shih-Chieh Shen in 1994. and was named in honour of Shen's wife Hsiojen Lin Shen. It is found around Taiwan and off the coast of Vietnam.
