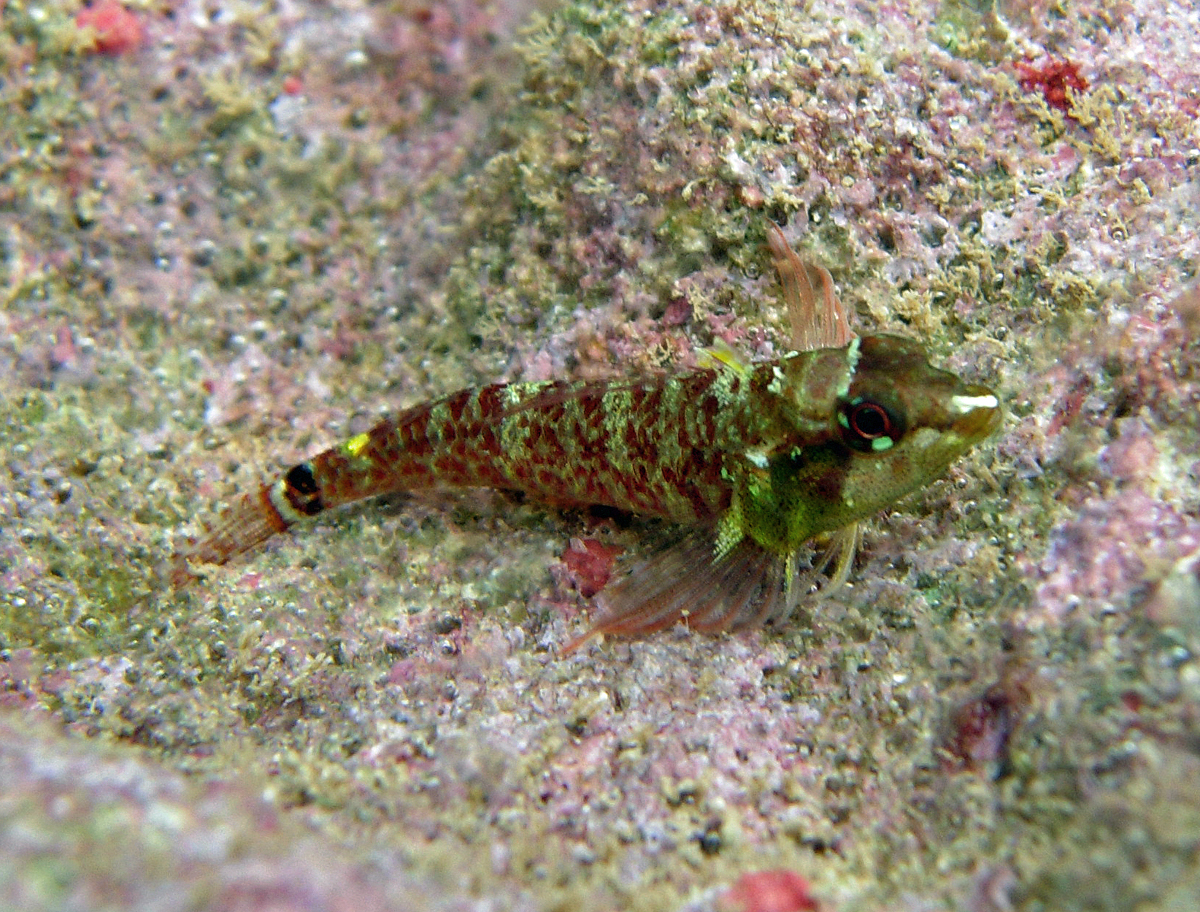

Conservation status
- Least Concern (IUCN 3.1)

Scientific classification
- Kingdom: Animalia
- Phylum: Chordata
- Class: Actinopterygii
- Division: Teleostei
- Order: Blenniiformes
- Family: Tripterygiidae
- Genus: Enneapterygius
- Species: E. elegans

Binomial name
- Enneapterygius elegans (Peters, 1876)

Synonyms
- Tripterygium elegans Peters, 1876

= Enneapterygius elegans =

Species of fish

Enneapterygius elegans, the hourglass triplefin (or elegant triplefin in the United Kingdom), is a species of triplefin blenny in the genus Enneapterygius. It was originally described by Wilhelm Peters as a species of Tripterygium, in 1876, but was reassigned to Enneapterygius by W. Holleman in 1986. It is a tropical blenny known from reefs across the western central Indian to the central Pacific Ocean, and swims at a depth range of 0–12 metres. Male hourglass triplefins can reach a maximum length of 4 centimetres. The blenny gets its common name from an hourglass-shaped marking on its body.
