= Enneapterygius triserialis =

Conservation status
- Least Concern (IUCN 3.1)

Scientific classification
- Kingdom: Animalia
- Phylum: Chordata
- Class: Actinopterygii
- Order: Blenniiformes
- Family: Tripterygiidae
- Genus: Enneapterygius
- Species: E. triserialis

Binomial name
- Enneapterygius triserialis Fricke, 1994

Species of fish

Enneapterygius triserialis, the white-spotted triplefin, is a species of triplefin blenny in the genus Enneapterygius. It was described by Ronald Fricke in 1994. This species occurs in the southwest Pacific from Australia east through New Caledonia, Vanuatu, Tonga, Fiji, American Samoa and French Polynesia.
