= Enneapterygius unimaculatus =

Conservation status
- Least Concern (IUCN 3.1)

Scientific classification
- Kingdom: Animalia
- Phylum: Chordata
- Class: Actinopterygii
- Order: Blenniiformes
- Family: Tripterygiidae
- Genus: Enneapterygius
- Species: E. unimaculatus

Binomial name
- Enneapterygius unimaculatus Fricke, 1994

Species of fish

Enneapterygius unimaculatus, the onespot triplefin, is a species of triplefin blenny in the genus Enneapterygius. It was described by Ronald Fricke in 1994. This species occurs in the western Pacific Ocean and its range encompasses the Ryukyu Islands, Taiwan, Philippines, Sabah, Indonesia, Papua New Guinea, and Palau.
