= Enneapterygius nanus =

Conservation status
- Least Concern (IUCN 3.1)

Scientific classification
- Kingdom: Animalia
- Phylum: Chordata
- Class: Actinopterygii
- Order: Blenniiformes
- Family: Tripterygiidae
- Genus: Enneapterygius
- Species: E. nanus

Binomial name
- Enneapterygius nanus (Schultz, 1960)

Synonyms
- Tripterygion nanus Schultz, 1960

Species of fish

Enneapterygius nanus, the pygmy triplefin or pygmy threefin, is a species of triplefin blenny in the genus Enneapterygius. It was described by Leonard Peter Schultz in 1960. This species is found from Taiwan and central Indonesia to New Caledonia and the Marshall Islands.
