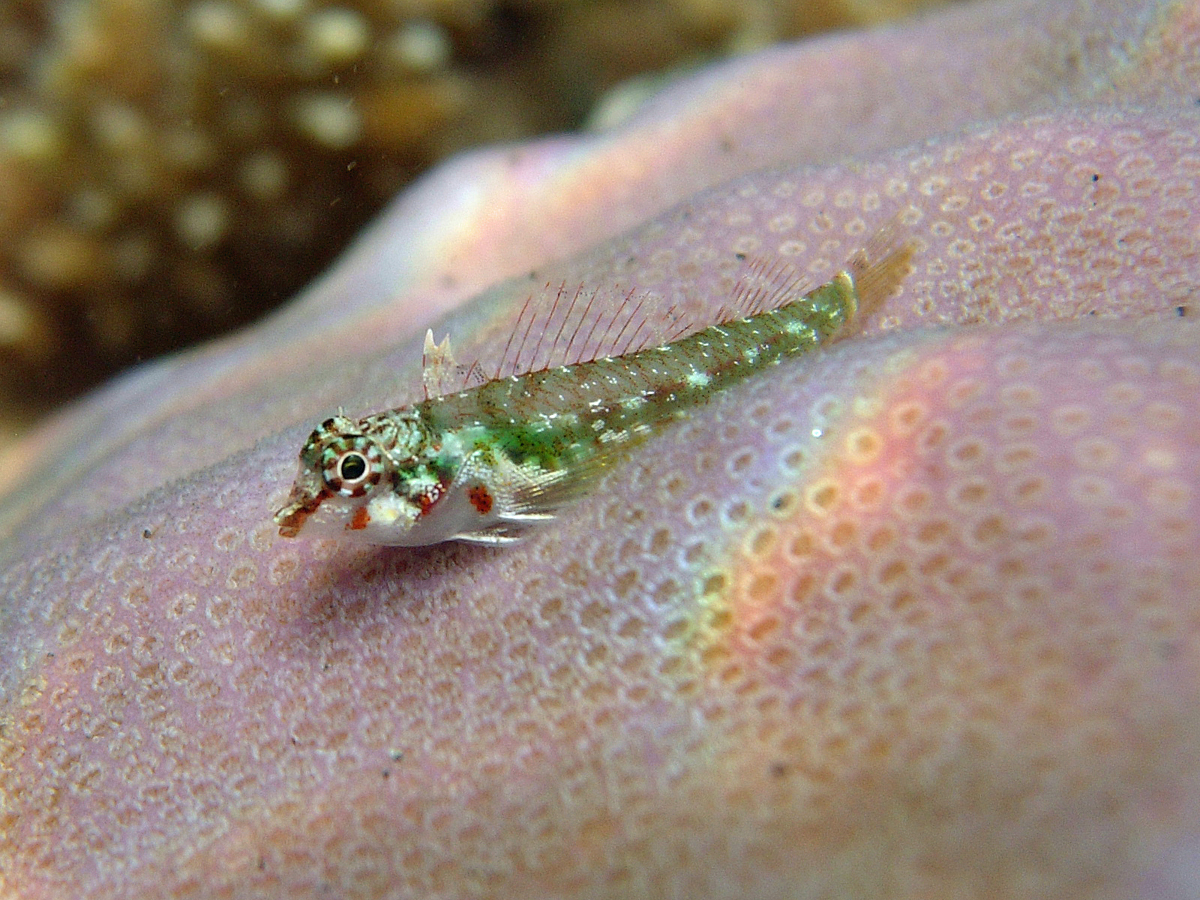

Conservation status
- Least Concern (IUCN 3.1)

Scientific classification
- Kingdom: Animalia
- Phylum: Chordata
- Class: Actinopterygii
- Order: Blenniiformes
- Family: Tripterygiidae
- Genus: Enneapterygius
- Species: E. gruschkai

Binomial name
- Enneapterygius gruschkai Holleman, 2005

= Enneapterygius gruschkai =

Species of fish

Enneapterygius gruschkai is a species of triplefin blenny in the genus Enneapterygius. It was described by Wouter Holleman in 2005. It is found in the archipelagoes of the western Indian Ocean, namely Réunion, Seychelles, Mauritius, St Brandon Shoals, the Comoros Islands, and the Chagos Archipelago. The specific name honours the American ichthyologist Victor G. Springer of the National Museum of Natural History, in recognition of his prominence in the study of blenniform fishes.
