= Ceratobregma acanthops =

Conservation status
- Least Concern (IUCN 3.1)

Scientific classification
- Kingdom: Animalia
- Phylum: Chordata
- Class: Actinopterygii
- Order: Blenniiformes
- Family: Tripterygiidae
- Genus: Ceratobregma
- Species: C. acanthops

Binomial name
- Ceratobregma acanthops (Whitley, 1964)

Synonyms
- Vauclusella acanthops Whitley, 1964

Species of fish

Ceratobregma acanthops, known commonly as the spotted spiny-eye triplefin, is a species of triplefin blenny which is found off north-eastern Australia.
