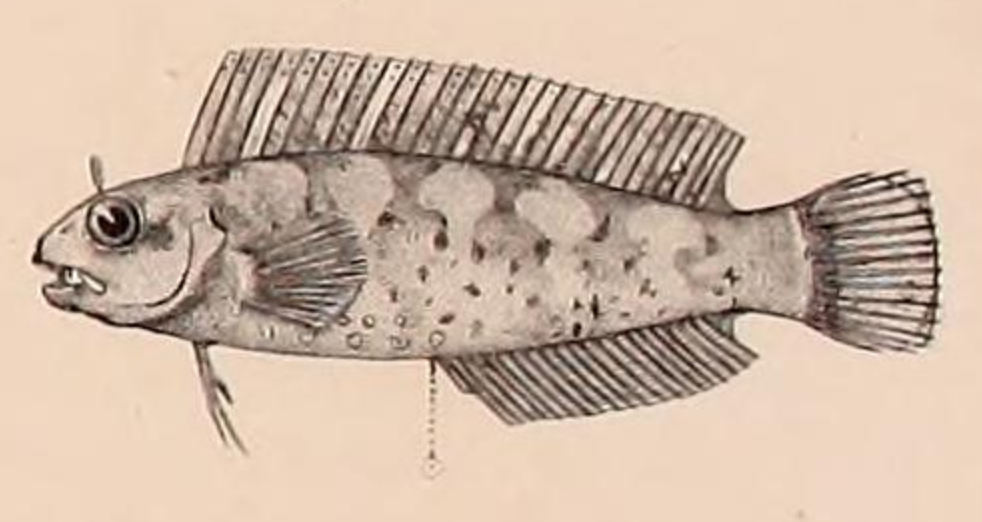

Conservation status
- Least Concern (IUCN 3.1)

Scientific classification
- Kingdom: Animalia
- Phylum: Chordata
- Class: Actinopterygii
- Order: Blenniiformes
- Family: Tripterygiidae
- Genus: Enneapterygius
- Species: E. pusillus

Binomial name
- Enneapterygius pusillus Rüppell, 1835

Synonyms
- Helcogramma pusillus (Rüppell, 1835)

= Enneapterygius pusillus =

Species of fish

Enneapterygius pusillus, known commonly as the highcrest triplefin, is a species of triplefin blenny in the genus Enneapterygius. It was described by Eduard Rüppell in 1835. It occurs in the western Indian Ocean, including the Red Sea and along the southern coast of the Arabian Peninsula as far east as Oman, off the far south eastern coast of India, the Persian Gulf, and along the coast of south eastern Africa off Mozambique and South Africa.
