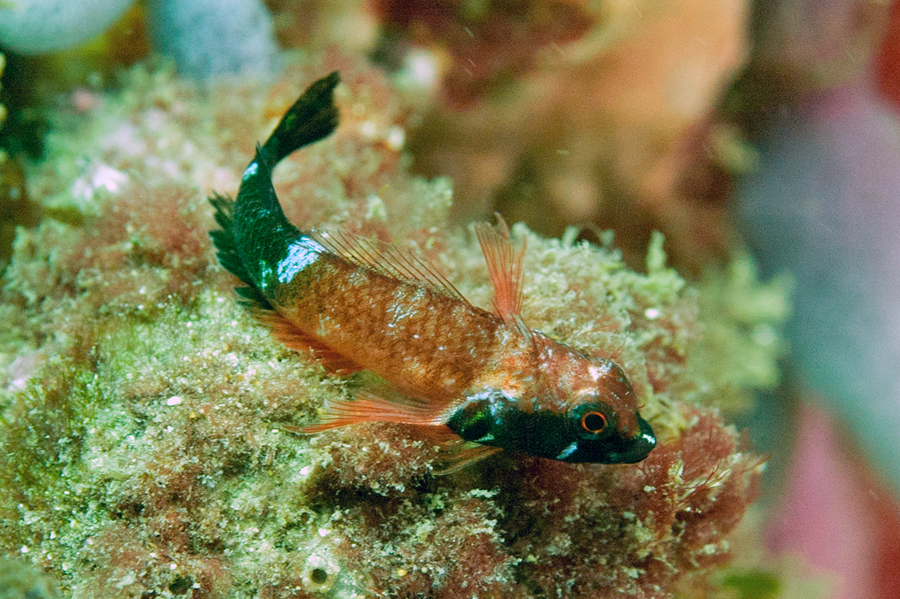

Conservation status
- Least Concern (IUCN 3.1)

Scientific classification
- Kingdom: Animalia
- Phylum: Chordata
- Class: Actinopterygii
- Order: Blenniiformes
- Family: Tripterygiidae
- Genus: Enneapterygius
- Species: E. rufopileus

Binomial name
- Enneapterygius rufopileus (Waite, 1904)

Synonyms
- Tripterygion rufopileum Waite, 1904; Vauclusella rufopilea (Waite, 1904)

= Enneapterygius rufopileus =

Species of fish

Enneapterygius rufopileus, the blackcheek threefin, Lord Howe black-head triplefin or redcap triplefin, is a species of triplefin blenny in the genus Enneapterygius. It was described by Edgar Ravenswood Waite in 1904. It occurs in the western Pacific Ocean off Lord Howe Island, Norfolk Island, New Caledonia, Fiji and Tonga.
