= Enneapterygius namarrgon =

Conservation status
- Endangered (IUCN 3.1)

Scientific classification
- Kingdom: Animalia
- Phylum: Chordata
- Class: Actinopterygii
- Order: Blenniiformes
- Family: Tripterygiidae
- Genus: Enneapterygius
- Species: E. namarrgon

Binomial name
- Enneapterygius namarrgon Fricke, 1997

Species of fish

Enneapterygius namarrgon, the lightning man triplefin, is a species of triplefin blenny in the genus Enneapterygius. It was described by the German ichthyologist Ronald Fricke in 1997. The specific name refers to Namarrgon, the Lightning man who makes lightning appear and creates roars of thunder in storms, a mythical figure in western Arnhem Land, as does the common name. This species is endemic to the Gove Peninsula in Arnhem Land in the Northern Territory. The IUCN classifies this species as Endangered because it has a small range and is threatened by mining for bauxite.
