= Acanthanectes hystrix =

Conservation status
- Least Concern (IUCN 3.1)

Scientific classification
- Kingdom: Animalia
- Phylum: Chordata
- Class: Actinopterygii
- Order: Blenniiformes
- Family: Tripterygiidae
- Genus: Acanthanectes
- Species: A. hystrix

Binomial name
- Acanthanectes hystrix Holleman & Buxton, 1993

Species of fish

Acanthanectes hystrix is a species of triplefin blenny. It was described by Holleman and Buxton in 1993. So far the species has only been recorded in the waters off Tsitsikamma National Park in the Eastern Cape, South Africa but its distribution is probably more extensive, although it is likely to endemic to South Africa. It is a demersal species which is found below the low water mark on rocky reefs with microalgae at depths of 10 to 24 metres (33 to 79 ft). Their eggs hemispherical in shape and are coated with many sticky threads which fix them among the algae at the nesting sites. The larvae are planktonic and have mainly been recorded from shallow, inshore areas. The specific name hystrix means porcupine and refers to the spiny appearance of this fish.
