= Enneapterygius genamaculatus =

Conservation status
- Least Concern (IUCN 3.1)

Scientific classification
- Kingdom: Animalia
- Phylum: Chordata
- Class: Actinopterygii
- Order: Blenniiformes
- Family: Tripterygiidae
- Genus: Enneapterygius
- Species: E. genamaculatus

Binomial name
- Enneapterygius genamaculatus Holleman, 2005

Species of fish

Enneapterygius genamaculatus is a species of triplefin blenny in the genus Enneapterygius. It was described by Wouter Holleman in 2005. This species is endemic to St Brandon shoals, part of Mauritius.
