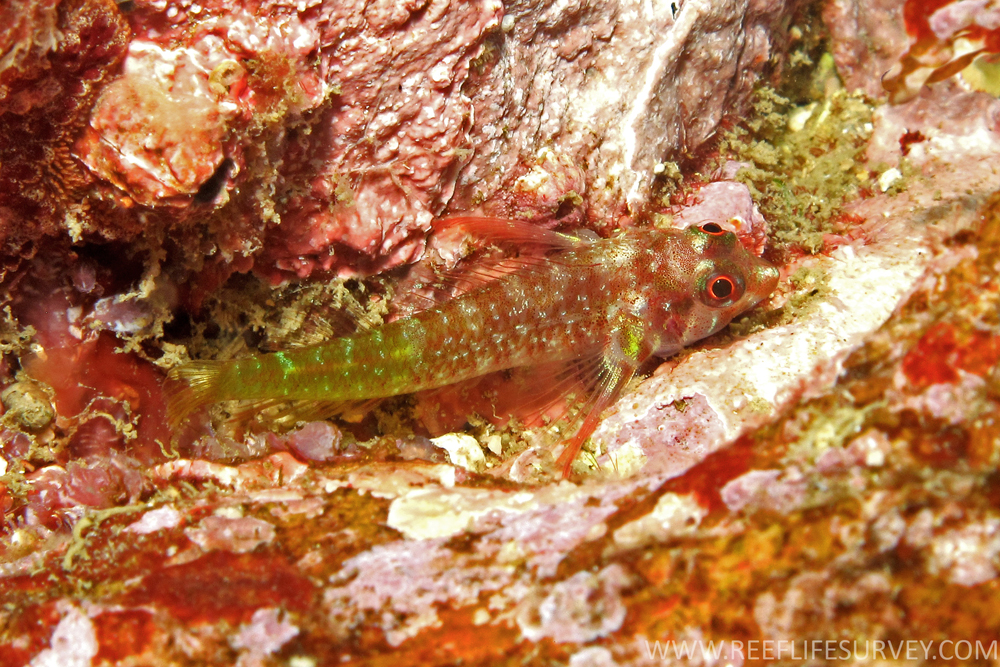

Conservation status
- Least Concern (IUCN 3.1)

Scientific classification
- Kingdom: Animalia
- Phylum: Chordata
- Class: Actinopterygii
- Division: Teleostei
- Order: Blenniiformes
- Family: Tripterygiidae
- Genus: Enneapterygius
- Species: E. atrogulare

Binomial name
- Enneapterygius atrogulare (Günther, 1873)

Synonyms
- Tripterygium atrogulare Günther, 1873

= Enneapterygius atrogulare =

Species of fish

Enneapterygius atrogulare is a species of triplefin blenny in the genus Enneapterygius. Although it is known as the blackthroat triplefin in the United Kingdom, it is also known as the ring-scale triplefin, black triplefin, eastern white-barred threefin, ringed triplefin, eastern Australian blackhead triplefin or the saddled triplefin in Australia. It is a subtropical, non-migratory blenny found in coral reefs in the western Pacific Ocean, around Australia and Tonga. Blackthroat triplefins swim at a depth range of 0–5 metres, and both juveniles and adults feed primarily on benthic algae, weeds, and invertebrates. Male E. atrogulare can reach a maximum length of 5 centimetres.
