= Enneapterygius kosiensis =

Conservation status
- Least Concern (IUCN 3.1)

Scientific classification
- Kingdom: Animalia
- Phylum: Chordata
- Class: Actinopterygii
- Order: Blenniiformes
- Family: Tripterygiidae
- Genus: Enneapterygius
- Species: E. kosiensis

Binomial name
- Enneapterygius kosiensis Holleman, 2005

Species of fish

Enneapterygius kosiensis is a species of triplefin blenny in the genus Enneapterygius. It was described by Wouter Holleman of the South African Institute for Aquatic Biodiversity in 2005. It has only been recorded from the coasts of the northern part of KwaZulu Natal in South Africa.
