= Enneapterygius melanospilus =

Conservation status
- Least Concern (IUCN 3.1)

Scientific classification
- Kingdom: Animalia
- Phylum: Chordata
- Class: Actinopterygii
- Order: Blenniiformes
- Family: Tripterygiidae
- Genus: Enneapterygius
- Species: E. melanospilus

Binomial name
- Enneapterygius melanospilus Randall, 1995

Species of fish

Enneapterygius melanospilus is a species of triplefin blenny in the genus Enneapterygius. It was described by John E. Randall in 1995. It is found in the Arabian Sea off Oman.
