= Enneapterygius sheni =

Conservation status
- Data Deficient (IUCN 3.1)

Scientific classification
- Kingdom: Animalia
- Phylum: Chordata
- Class: Actinopterygii
- Order: Blenniiformes
- Family: Tripterygiidae
- Genus: Enneapterygius
- Species: E. sheni

Binomial name
- Enneapterygius sheni M. C. Chiang & I. S. Chen, 2008

Species of fish

Enneapterygius sheni is a species of triplefin blenny in the genus Enneapterygius. It was described by Chiang Min-Chia and Chen I-Shiung in 2008.

== Etymology ==
The specific name honours the ichthyologist Shieh-Chieh Shen of the National Taiwan University. This species has only been recorded from the southern tip of Taiwan.
