= Ceratobregma helenae =

Conservation status
- Least Concern (IUCN 3.1)

Scientific classification
- Kingdom: Animalia
- Phylum: Chordata
- Class: Actinopterygii
- Order: Blenniiformes
- Family: Tripterygiidae
- Genus: Ceratobregma
- Species: C. helenae

Binomial name
- Ceratobregma helenae Holleman, 1987

Species of fish

Ceratobregma helenae, known commonly as the Helen's triplefin, is a species of triplefin blenny. It has an Indo-Pacific distribution from Christmas Island to Samoa, north to Taiwan and south to south eastern Australia. The species is named after Wouter Holleman's wife, Helen.
