= Enneapterygius clarkae =

Conservation status
- Least Concern (IUCN 3.1)

Scientific classification
- Kingdom: Animalia
- Phylum: Chordata
- Class: Actinopterygii
- Order: Blenniiformes
- Family: Tripterygiidae
- Genus: Enneapterygius
- Species: E. clarkae

Binomial name
- Enneapterygius clarkae Holleman, 1982

Species of fish

Enneapterygius clarkae, the barred triplefin, is a species of threefin blenny in the genus Enneapterygius. It was described by Wouter Holleman in 1982, and was given its species epithet in honour of American ichthyologist Eugenie Clark (1922-2015) It is a tropical blenny known from the Indian Ocean, and has been described from the Red Sea to Natal, South Africa. Male barred triplefins can reach a maximum length of 2.5 centimetres.
