= Enneapterygius cheni =

Conservation status
- Least Concern (IUCN 3.1)

Scientific classification
- Kingdom: Animalia
- Phylum: Chordata
- Class: Actinopterygii
- Division: Teleostei
- Order: Blenniiformes
- Family: Tripterygiidae
- Genus: Enneapterygius
- Species: E. cheni

Binomial name
- Enneapterygius cheni S. C. Wang, K. T. Shao & S. C. Shen, 1996

Species of fish

Enneapterygius cheni is a species of threefin blenny in the genus Enneapterygius. It was described by S.C. Wang, K.T. Shao, and S.C. Shen in 1996. It is a subtropical blenny found in the northwestern Pacific Ocean, and swims at depths ranging from 0–12 metres. It has been described from Taiwan and the Ryukyu Islands. Male E. cheni can reach a maximum length of 2.4 centimetres. The specific name honours the person who collected the type, Jeng-Ping Chen of the Taiwan Ocean Research Institute.
