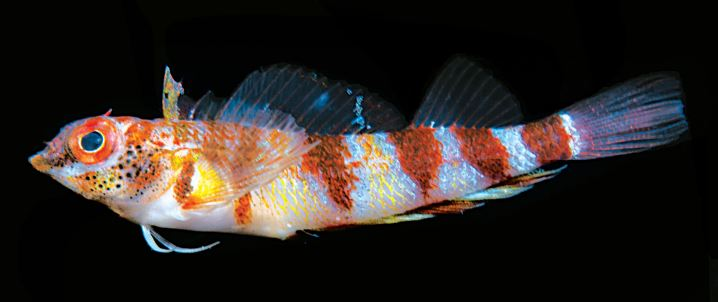

Scientific classification
- Kingdom: Animalia
- Phylum: Chordata
- Class: Actinopterygii
- Order: Blenniiformes
- Family: Tripterygiidae
- Genus: Enneapterygius
- Species: E. niue

Binomial name
- Enneapterygius niue Fricke & Erdmenn, 2017

= Enneapterygius niue =

Species of fish

Enneapterygius niue is a species of triplefin blenny which is found in the western Pacific around the islands of Niue and Samoa. It is found in the intertidal zone and coral reefs. It was described in 2017 by Ronald Fricke and Mark V. Erdmann.
