= Enneapterygius larsonae =

Conservation status
- Least Concern (IUCN 3.1)

Scientific classification
- Kingdom: Animalia
- Phylum: Chordata
- Class: Actinopterygii
- Order: Blenniiformes
- Family: Tripterygiidae
- Genus: Enneapterygius
- Species: E. larsonae

Binomial name
- Enneapterygius larsonae Fricke, 1994

Species of fish

Enneapterygius larsonae, known commonly as the Western Australian black-head triplefin, is a species of triplefin blenny in the genus Enneapterygius. It was described by the German ichthyologist Ronald Fricke in 1994. The specific name honours Helen K. Larson, the Curator of Fishes at the Museum and Art Gallery of the Northern Territory in Darwin, Australia, who collected the type.
