= Enneapterygius vexillarius =

Conservation status
- Least Concern (IUCN 3.1)

Scientific classification
- Kingdom: Animalia
- Phylum: Chordata
- Class: Actinopterygii
- Order: Blenniiformes
- Family: Tripterygiidae
- Genus: Enneapterygius
- Species: E. vexillarius

Binomial name
- Enneapterygius vexillarius Fowler, 1946

Species of fish

Enneapterygius vexillarius, the blacksaddle triplefin, is a species of triplefin blenny in the genus Enneapterygius. It was described by Henry Weed Fowler in 1946. Enneapterygius vexillarius has been recorded from the Ryukyu Islands, Taiwan and Hong Kong.
