= Enneapterygius similis =

Conservation status
- Least Concern (IUCN 3.1)

Scientific classification
- Kingdom: Animalia
- Phylum: Chordata
- Class: Actinopterygii
- Order: Blenniiformes
- Family: Tripterygiidae
- Genus: Enneapterygius
- Species: E. similis

Binomial name
- Enneapterygius similis Fricke, 1997

Species of fish

Enneapterygius similis, known commonly as the black and red triplefin, blacktail triplefin or masked threefin, is a species of triplefin blenny in the genus Enneapterygius. It was described by Ronald Fricke in 1997. This species occurs in the western central Pacific Ocean, from the Ryukyu Islands south through the Philippines, in Sabah, central Indonesia, Shepard Island, New Caledonia and eastern Australia.
