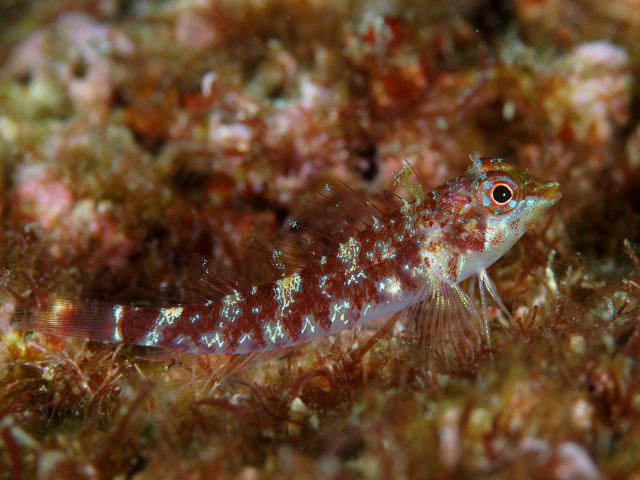
- Enneapterygius phoenicosoma
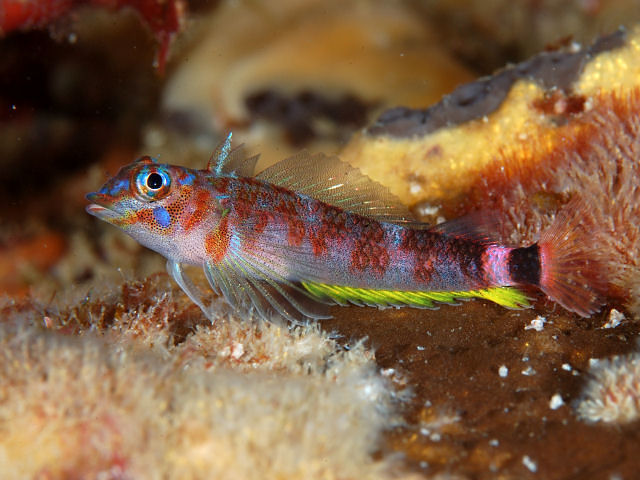
- Enneapterygius senoui

Scientific classification
- Kingdom: Animalia
- Phylum: Chordata
- Class: Actinopterygii
- Division: Teleostei
- Order: Blenniiformes
- Family: Tripterygiidae
- Subfamily: Tripterygiinae
- Genus: Enneapterygius; Rüppell, 1835

Type species
- Enneapterygius pusillus Rüppell, 1835

= Enneapterygius =

Genus of fishes

Enneapterygius is a genus of fish in the family Tripterygiidae found in the Indian and Pacific Ocean.

== Species ==
There are currently 63 recognized species in this genus:

- Enneapterygius abeli (Klausewitz, 1960) (Yellow triplefin)
- Enneapterygius altipinnis E. Clark, 1980
- Enneapterygius atriceps (O. P. Jenkins, 1903) (Hawaiian black-head triplefin)
- Enneapterygius atrogulare (Günther, 1873) (Black-throat triplefin)
- Enneapterygius bahasa R. Fricke, 1997
- Enneapterygius cheni S. C. Wang, K. T. Shao & S. C. Shen, 1996
- Enneapterygius clarkae Holleman, 1982 (Barred triplefin)
- Enneapterygius clea R. Fricke, 1997 (Clea's triplefin)
- Enneapterygius destai E. Clark, 1980
- Enneapterygius elaine Holleman, 2005
- Enneapterygius elegans (W. K. H. Peters, 1876) (Hourglass triplefin)
- Enneapterygius etheostomus (D. S. Jordan & Snyder, 1902)
- Enneapterygius fasciatus (M. C. W. Weber, 1909) (Banded triplefin)
- Enneapterygius flavoccipitis S. C. Shen, 1994 (Yellow-nape triplefin)
- Enneapterygius fuscoventer R. Fricke, 1997 (Black-belly triplefin)
- Enneapterygius genamaculatus Holleman, 2005
- Enneapterygius gracilis R. Fricke, 1994 (Northern yellow-black triplefin)
- Enneapterygius gruschkai Holleman, 2005
- Enneapterygius hemimelas (Kner & Steindachner, 1867) (Half-black triplefin)
- Enneapterygius hollemani J. E. Randall, 1995 (Holleman's triplefin)
- Enneapterygius howensis R. Fricke, 1997 (Lord Howe Island triplefin)
- Enneapterygius hsiojenae S. C. Shen, 1994
- Enneapterygius kermadecensis R. Fricke, 1994 (Kermadec triplefin)
- Enneapterygius kosiensis Holleman, 2005
- Enneapterygius larsonae R. Fricke, 1994 (Western Australian black-head triplefin)
- Enneapterygius leucopunctatus S. C. Shen, 1994 (White-spotted triplefin)
- Enneapterygius melanospilus J. E. Randall, 1995
- Enneapterygius minutus (Günther, 1877)
- Enneapterygius mirabilis R. Fricke, 1994 (Miracle triplefin)
- Enneapterygius miyakensis R. Fricke, 1987 (Izu Islands triplefin)
- Enneapterygius namarrgon R. Fricke, 1997 (Lightning-man triplefin)
- Enneapterygius nanus (L. P. Schultz, 1960) (Pygmy triplefin)
- Enneapterygius niger R. Fricke, 1994 (Black triplefin)
- Enneapterygius nigricauda R. Fricke, 1997 (Black-tail triplefin)
- Enneapterygius niue R. Fricke & Erdmann, 2017 (Red-bar triplefin)
- Enneapterygius obscurus E. Clark, 1980
- Enneapterygius ornatus R. Fricke, 1997 (Henderson triplefin)
- Enneapterygius pallidoserialis R. Fricke, 1997 (Pale white-spotted triplefin)
- Enneapterygius pallidus E. Clark, 1980
- Enneapterygius paucifasciatus R. Fricke, 1994 (New Caledonian striped triplefin)
- Enneapterygius philippinus (W. K. H. Peters, 1868) (Minute triplefin)
- Enneapterygius phoenicosoma Motomura, R. Ota & Meguro, 2015 (Red-bodied triplefin)
- Enneapterygius pusillus Rüppell, 1835 (High-crest triplefin)
- Enneapterygius pyramis R. Fricke, 1994 (Pyramid triplefin)
- Enneapterygius qirmiz Holleman & Bogorodsky, 2012
- Enneapterygius randalli R. Fricke, 1997 (Rapa triplefin)
- Enneapterygius rhabdotus R. Fricke, 1994 (Umpire triplefin)
- Enneapterygius rhothion R. Fricke, 1997 (Surf triplefin)
- Enneapterygius rubicauda S. C. Shen, 1994 (Red-tail triplefin)
- Enneapterygius rubrimarginatus Ronald Fricke, Mark V. Erdmann & Nesha K. Ichida, 2024
- Enneapterygius rufopileus (Waite, 1904) (Red-cap triplefin)
- Enneapterygius senoui Motomura, Harazaki & Hardy, 2005
- Enneapterygius shaoi M. C. Chiang & I. S. Chen, 2008
- Enneapterygius sheni M. C. Chiang & I. S. Chen, 2008
- Enneapterygius signicauda R. Fricke, 1997 (Flag-tail triplefin)
- Enneapterygius similis R. Fricke, 1997 (Black-and-Red triplefin)
- Enneapterygius triserialis R. Fricke, 1994
- Enneapterygius trisignatus R. Fricke, 2001
- Enneapterygius tutuilae D. S. Jordan & Seale, 1906 (High-hat triplefin)
- Enneapterygius unimaculatus R. Fricke, 1994 (One-spot triplefin)
- Enneapterygius ventermaculus Holleman, 1982 (Blotched triplefin)
- Enneapterygius vexillarius Fowler, 1946 (Black-saddle triplefin)
- Enneapterygius viridicauda R. Fricke, Erdmann & Sianipar, 2024
- Enneapterygius williamsi R. Fricke, 1997 (William's triplefin)
- Enneapterygius ziegleri R. Fricke, 1994 (Ziegler's triplefin)
