= Enneapterygius niger =

Conservation status
- Least Concern (IUCN 3.1)

Scientific classification
- Kingdom: Animalia
- Phylum: Chordata
- Class: Actinopterygii
- Order: Blenniiformes
- Family: Tripterygiidae
- Genus: Enneapterygius
- Species: E. niger

Binomial name
- Enneapterygius niger Fricke, 1994

Species of fish

Enneapterygius niger, known commonly as the black triplefin, is a species of triplefin blenny from the Western Pacific Ocean. It is a small species (up to 3.2 cm (1.3 in) total length) that was described by Ronald Fricke in 1994.
