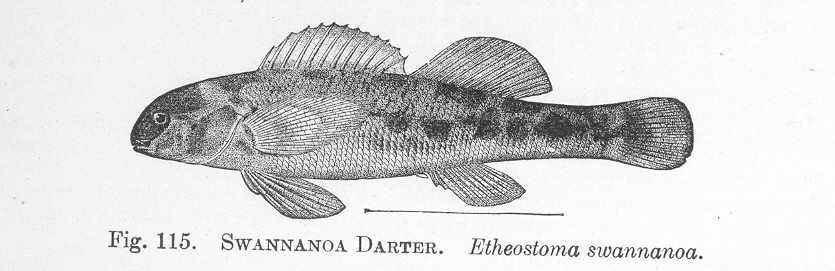

Conservation status
- Least Concern (IUCN 3.1)

Scientific classification
- Kingdom: Animalia
- Phylum: Chordata
- Class: Actinopterygii
- Order: Perciformes
- Family: Percidae
- Genus: Etheostoma
- Species: E. swannanoa

Binomial name
- Etheostoma swannanoa D. S. Jordan & Evermann, 1889

= Swannanoa darter =

Species of fish

The Swannanoa darter (Etheostoma swannanoa) is a species of freshwater ray-finned fish, a darter from the subfamily Etheostomatinae, part of the family Percidae, which also contains the perches, ruffes and pikeperches. It is endemic to the eastern United States where it occurs in the drainage of the Tennessee River. It prefers flowing water in riffles in cool, clear mountain streams, with boulder substrates. The diet and natural history of this species have been little studied but are probably similar to those of its close relative, the greenside darter (Etheostoma blenniodies). The population trend of this fish seems to be stable and it is a common species with numerous sub-populations over its limited range, and the International Union for Conservation of Nature has assessed its conservation status as being of "least concern".

== Distribution ==
The Swannanoa darter has a relatively limited distribution compared to some other etheostomid darters. It can be found in the southern Appalachian Mountain headwaters of the Tennessee River and other areas in East Tennessee, Southwest Virginia, and Western North Carolina. It is found in the Clinch and Powell River systems in Virginia and through the upper Holston and French Broad River systems along the Tennessee, Virginia, and North Carolina borders. Although it has been documented in the Clinch and Powell River systems in Virginia, it is not found in these same systems in Tennessee. E. swannanoa was found only sporadically in the Tennessee River headwaters and specifically in the Clinch, Holston, Watauga, and Nolichucky Rivers. It prefers cold, clear water with boulder substrates.

== Ecology ==
The Swannanoa darter prefers flowing water in riffles pools in cool, clear mountain streams. For the greenside darter (Etheostoma blenniodies), a close relative of the Swannanoa darter found in similar areas, juveniles mostly eat midge larvae and microcrustaceans. Adults have more varied diets, primarily made up of mayflies and caddisflies. Adults also eat midge, black fly, and other aquatic insect larvae. In some areas, such as the Little River of Tennessee, adults ate many Leptoxis spp. snails. Feeding intensity is much less in winter and greatest in May and June. Juvenile specimens were lacking in summer and early fall collections. This suggests the juvenile habitat is different from the adult habitat. Pollution from mining operations and the impoundment of streams and rivers throughout the Swannanoa darter's range has possibly resulted in declines in distribution.

== Lifecycle ==
Unfortunately, not much is known about the lifecycle of Swannanoa darters compared to some other members of the genus Etheostoma. The breeding season of the Swannanoa darter is in early spring, and has been observed to occur on 2 April. Greenside darters also spawn in early spring, when water temperatures reach 50–53 °F (10–12 °C) and this is probably similar to the time when Swannanoa darters breed. Swannanoa darters spawn on variable substrates, and these may include vegetation, sand, or rock substrates. Sexual maturity is usually achieved at about one year of age, and growth is rapid. Lengths of about 45 mm (1.8 in) are achieved after the first year of growth, as well. Adults can reach up to 90 mm (3.5 in) in length. Greenside darters, which share many lifecycle characteristics with Swannanoa darters, usually live for about five years.

== Management ==
Currently, little to no active management is used specifically for the Swannanoa darter. Trout, which are often associated with Swannanoa darters, drive much of the current management of the streams and rivers where these darters are found because of their recreational and economic value in the southern Appalachian Mountains. Much of the current range of the Swannanoa darter lies within protected areas in national forests and parks, but any activity that increases sedimentation or decreases water flow could negatively impact this species. Activities with a potential for negative effects include careless logging, mining, development, and impoundment of streams and rivers. In the lower elevations and larger water bodies where these darters are found, pollution and contaminants could also pose problems for this species. The use of streamside management zones (SMZs), an excellent management practice used to protect stream health and water quality, in turn benefits these darters. Water quality monitoring, including water chemistry, temperature and dissolved oxygen, would be helpful to obtain baseline data and monitor for possible negative trends. Due to the lack of research on E. swannanoa, current management should also include research to gain knowledge on specific habitat needs for this fish.
