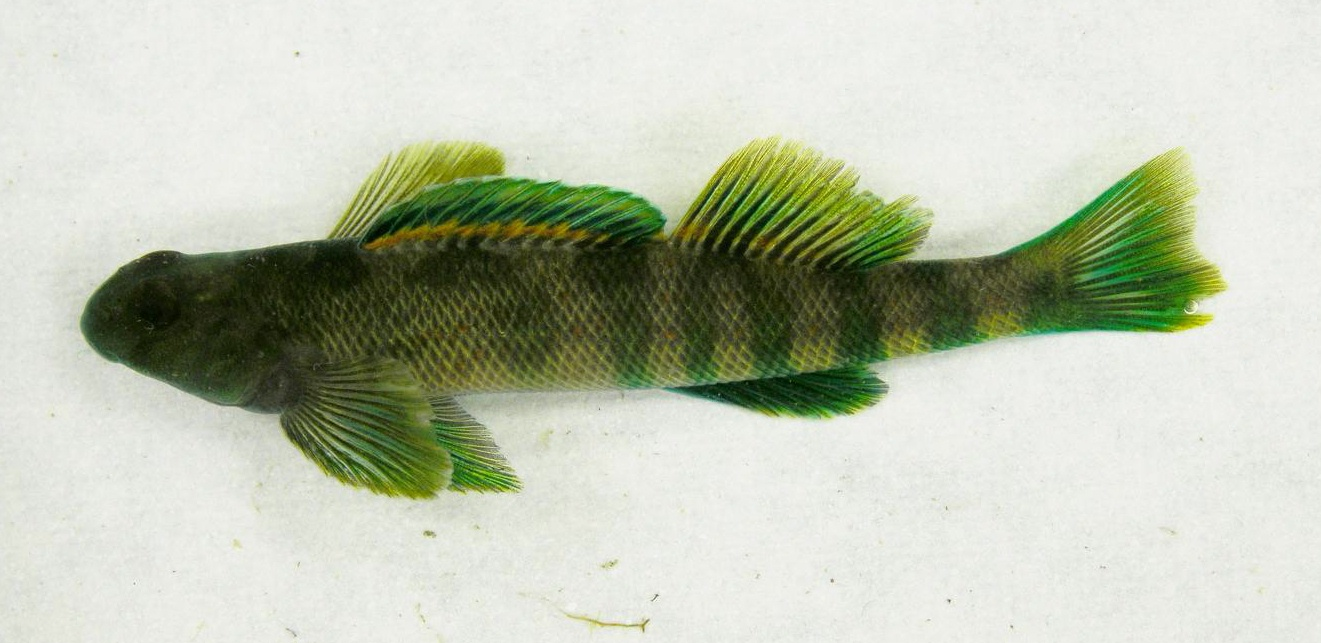

Conservation status
- Least Concern (IUCN 3.1)

Scientific classification
- Kingdom: Animalia
- Phylum: Chordata
- Class: Actinopterygii
- Order: Perciformes
- Family: Percidae
- Genus: Etheostoma
- Species: E. blennioides

Binomial name
- Etheostoma blennioides Rafinesque, 1819

Synonyms
- Etheostoma blennioides blennioides Rafinesque, 1819

= Greenside darter =

Species of fish

The greenside darter (Etheostoma blennioides) is a species of freshwater ray-finned fish, a darter from the subfamily Etheostomatinae, part of the family Percidae, which also contains the perches, ruffes and pikeperches. It inhabits swift riffles in the eastern United States and southern Ontario.

== Biology ==
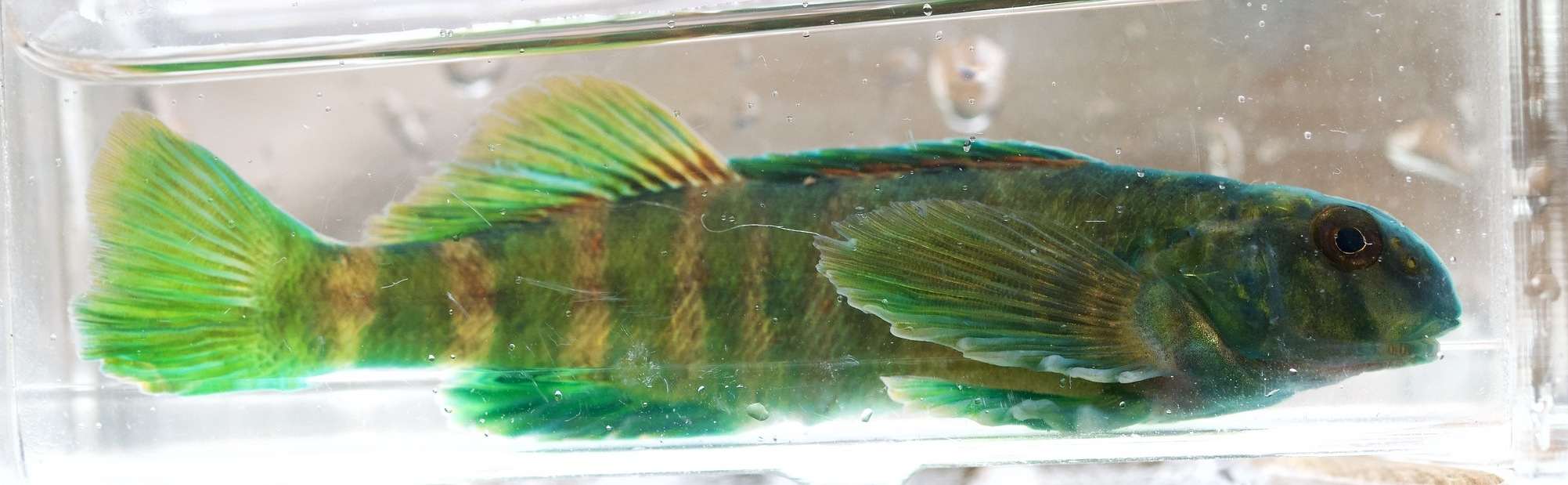
Ontario, Canada

Greenside darters typically live for three to five years, grow to a maximum of 5.2 inches (132 mm) standard length and sexually mature at one to two years of age. Greenside darters are reproductively active from February to April in the Midwest and Southeastern United States. Spawning occurs over algae- or moss-covered rocks in deep, swift riffles that are guarded by males who vigorously defend against intruders. Females linger in pools below the riffle and move into a male's territory when ready to spawn. Eggs are viscous and stick together in small clumps on green algae (Cladophora), moss (Fontinalis), and riverweed (Podostemaceae). E. blennioides is insectivorous, with analyzed gut contents containing Nematocera larvae, more specifically black fly and midge (Chironomidae) larvae. Significant numbers of mayfly (Ephemeroptera) and caddisfly (Trichoptera) nymphs were also found.

== Description ==
The greenside darters have an elongated body with a long and rounded snout. The dorsum is greenish-brown, with six or seven dark quadrate saddles and the sides with five to eight dark green, typically U- or W-shaped blotches. The nape, cheeks, opercle, and belly are completely scaled, with the breast naked. The anal fin has six to 10 rays (usually eight) and 13 to 16 pectoral fin rays, and both are bright green in breeding males; caudal fins are yellowish to clear; dorsal fin rays number 12 to 15, with red basal bands; breeding males have intensely bluish-green nasal and oral areas and sometimes black on the head.

== Conservation ==
E. blennioides is currently secure throughout its range, except in Mississippi where its habitat was altered by the Tennessee–Tombigbee Waterway.

== Distribution ==
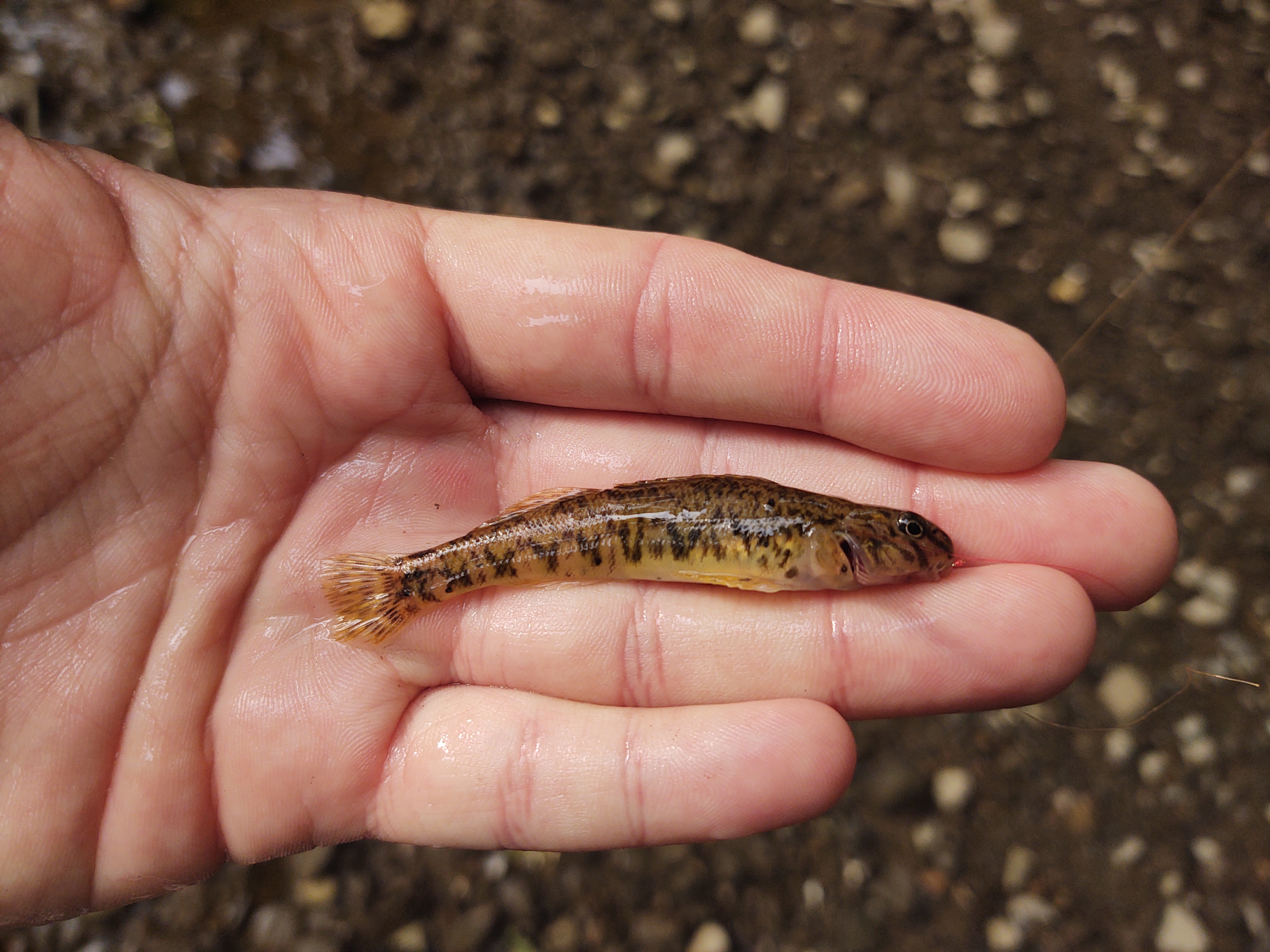
A greenside darter caught in Columbus, Ohio on June 1, 2024.

The E. blennioides subspecies are believed to have diverged in separate drainage systems and glacial refugia during the Pleistocene ice ages, which destroyed older connections and shaped new river systems.

- E. b. blennioides (northern greenside darter) ranges throughout the Ohio River basin and northeast into the Potomac and upper Genesee Rivers.
- E. b. newmanii (highlands greenside darter) occurs in the Cumberland and Tennessee River drainages of Alabama, Kentucky, and Tennessee; it also occurs in the Arkansas, Ouachita, St. Francis, and White Rivers of Arkansas and Missouri.
- E. b. pholidotum (central greenside darter) occurs in north-flowing rivers of the northern Ozarks, the Wabash basin, the Maumee River drainage, and along the shores of Lake Erie and Lake Ontario.

== Etymology ==
- Etheostoma: etheo meaning filter or strain and stoma meaning mouth
- E. b. blennioides: referring to its resemblance to the Mediterranean blennies Constantine S. Rafinesque knew in his early years
- E. b. newmanii: patronymic for Francis H. Newman, aquatic biologist, who collected the type specimen
- E. b. pholidotum: meaning scaled, referring to its fully scaled belly.

== Habitat ==
Greenside darters inhabit gravel riffles of large creeks to medium rivers and often are found in swift waters over large boulders and large rubble.

== Systematics ==
The greenside darter was first formally described in 1819 by the French naturalist Constantine Samuel Rafinesque (1783–1840) with the type locality given as the Ohio River. Rafinesque placed the new species in a new genus Etheostoma and it was subsequently designated as the type species of that genus by Louis Agassiz in 1854. Rafinesque gave the species the specific name blennoidies because of its resemblance to the blennies.

As previously stated, Miller (1968) concluded the E. blennioides complex consists of the four subspecies above. Unpublished studies by Richard L. Mayden and colleagues indicate E. b. newmanii from the Cumberland and Tennessee Rivers may be a valid species and distinct from other members of the complex. The former subspecies, E. b. gustelli has recently been re-elevated to species status, Etheostoma gustelli (Tuckasegee darter) based on lack of hybridization.

Etheostoma blennioides belongs to the subgenus Etheostoma that contains these species:

- E. blennius (blenny darter)
- E. gutselli (Tuckasegee darter)
- E. histrio (harlequin darter)
- E. inscriptum (turquoise darter)
- E. lynceum (brighteye darter)
- E. rupestre (rock darter)
- E. sellare (Maryland darter)
- E. swannanoa (Swannanoa darter)
- E. thalassinum (seagreen darter)
- E. zonale (banded darter)

Etheostoma blennioides is further nested within the greenside darter group that contains E. blennius, E. gutselli, E. inscriptum, E. swannanoa, and E. thalassinum.
