= ULCA =

ULCA may refer to:

- Union for Aromanian Language and Culture, or Uniunea trã Limba shi Cultura Armãnã in Aromanian
- United Lutheran Church in America

== See also ==
- UCLA (disambiguation)
