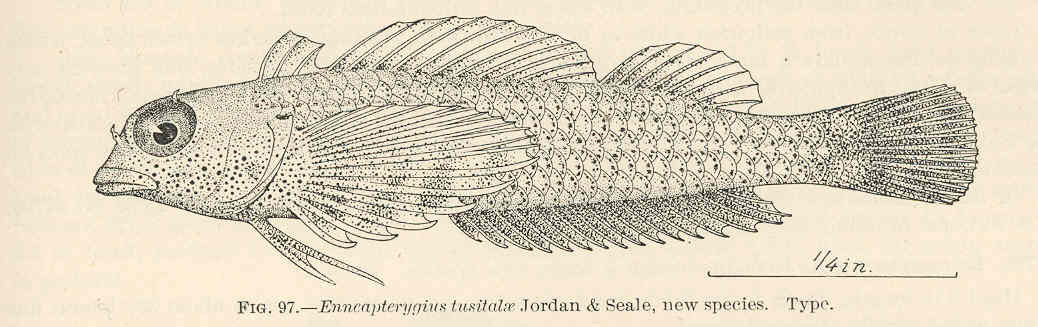

Conservation status
- Least Concern (IUCN 3.1)

Scientific classification
- Kingdom: Animalia
- Phylum: Chordata
- Class: Actinopterygii
- Order: Blenniiformes
- Family: Tripterygiidae
- Genus: Enneapterygius
- Species: E. minutus

Binomial name
- Enneapterygius minutus (Günther, 1877)

Synonyms
- Tripterygion minutus Günther, 1877; Enneapterygius cerasinus Jordan & Seale, 1906; Enneapterygius pardochir Jordan & Seale, 1906; Enneapterygius tusitalae Jordan & Seale, 1906; Tripterygium callionymi Weber, 1909; Tripterygion callionymi (Weber, 1909); Enneapterygius punctulatus Herre, 1935; Tripterygion punctulatum (Herre, 1935); Enneapterygius waigiensis Herre, 1935; Tripterygion waigiense (Herre, 1935)

= Enneapterygius minutus =

Species of fish

Enneapterygius minutus, the minute triplefin, is a species of triplefin blenny in the genus Enneapterygius. It was described by Günther in 1877. It is found in the Indo-Pacific south to Australia, north to the Ryukyu Islands and east to American Samoa.
