= Enneapterygius williamsi =

Conservation status
- Least Concern (IUCN 3.1)

Scientific classification
- Kingdom: Animalia
- Phylum: Chordata
- Class: Actinopterygii
- Division: Teleostei
- Order: Blenniiformes
- Family: Tripterygiidae
- Genus: Enneapterygius
- Species: E. williamsi

Binomial name
- Enneapterygius williamsi Fricke, 1997

Species of fish

Enneapterygius williamsi, known commonly as the William's triplefin, is a species of triplefin blenny in the genus Enneapterygius. It was described by Ronald Fricke in 1997. Its specific name honours the collector of the type, the ichthyologist Jeffrey T. Williams of the Smithsonian Institution.
