= Enneapterygius philippinus =

Conservation status
- Data Deficient (IUCN 3.1)

Scientific classification
- Kingdom: Animalia
- Phylum: Chordata
- Class: Actinopterygii
- Division: Teleostei
- Order: Blenniiformes
- Family: Tripterygiidae
- Genus: Enneapterygius
- Species: E. philippinus

Binomial name
- Enneapterygius philippinus (Peters, 1868)

Synonyms
- Tripterygium philippinum Peters, 1868

Species of fish

Enneapterygius philippinus, the minute triplefin, is a species of triplefin blenny in the genus Enneapterygius. It was described by Wilhelm Peters in 1868. This species occurs in the Indo-Pacific from Christmas Island to Samoa, and from the Ryukyu Islands in the north south to Australia.
