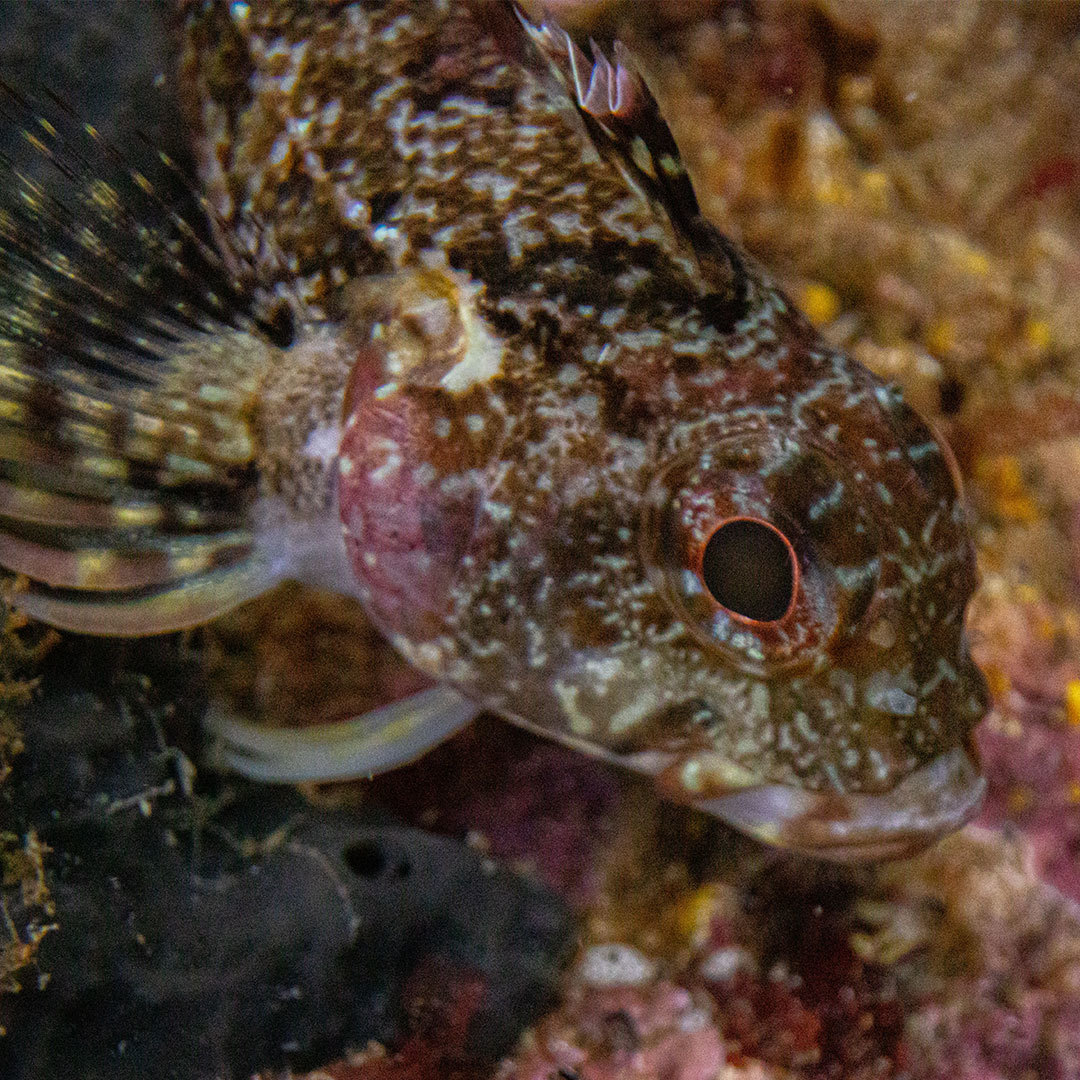

Conservation status
- Least Concern (IUCN 3.1)

Scientific classification
- Kingdom: Animalia
- Phylum: Chordata
- Class: Actinopterygii
- Order: Blenniiformes
- Family: Tripterygiidae
- Genus: Karalepis
- Species: K. stewarti

Binomial name
- Karalepis stewarti Hardy, 1984

= Scaly-headed triplefin =

Species of fish

The scaly-headed triplefin (Karalepis stewarti) is a triplefin, the only species in the genus Karalepis. It is endemic to New Zealand where it is found around North Island, South Island, the Three Kings Islands, Snares Island and Stewart Island. It is a nocturnal species It occurs at depths of about 5 to 30 metres (16 to 98 ft), in reef areas of broken rock. The specific name honours Andy Stewart of the Department of Fishes at the National Museum of New Zealand.

== External references ==
- "Karalepis stewarti". Integrated Taxonomic Information System.
