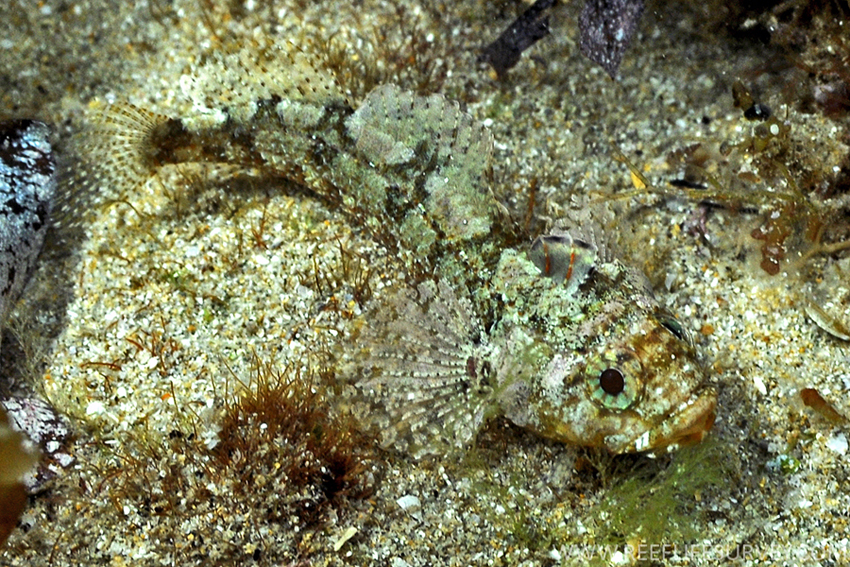

Conservation status
- Least Concern (IUCN 3.1)

Scientific classification
- Kingdom: Animalia
- Phylum: Chordata
- Class: Actinopterygii
- Order: Blenniiformes
- Family: Tripterygiidae
- Subfamily: Tripterygiinae
- Genus: Trianectes
- Species: T. bucephalus

Binomial name
- Trianectes bucephalus McCulloch & Waite, 1918

= Bullhead triplefin =

Species of fish

The bullhead triplefin (Trianectes bucephalus) is a fish of the family Tripterygiidae and only member of the genus Trianectes

== Description ==
Its length is up to about 7 cm.

This nocturnal species is infrequently observed, during the day it often shelters beneath small rocks.

== Ecosystem ==
The bullhead triplefin is found in the eastern Indian Ocean around southern Australia, from Western Australia to Victoria and Tasmania at depths down to 5 m. The animal inhabits intertidal areas.
