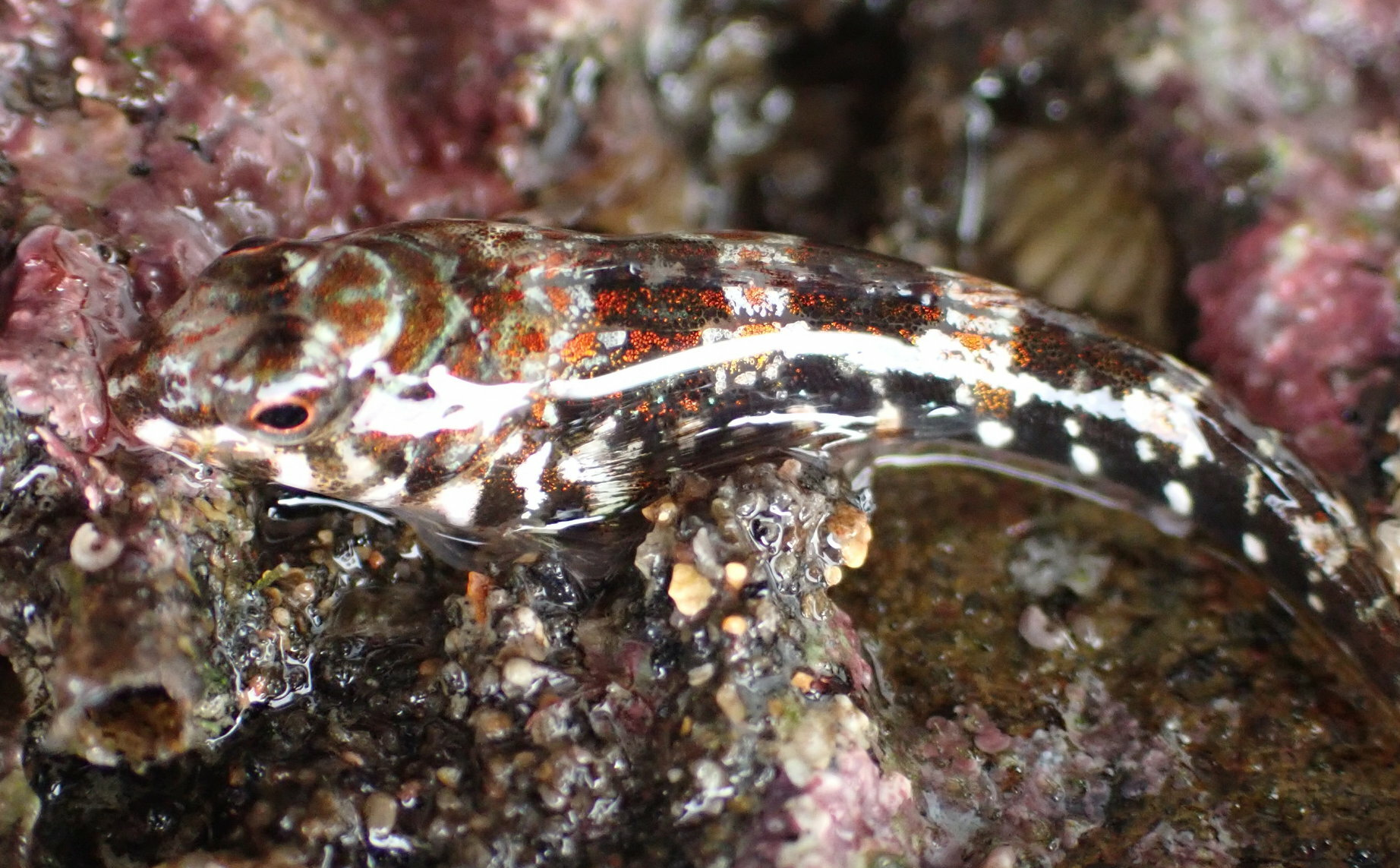

Conservation status
- Least Concern (IUCN 3.1)

Scientific classification
- Kingdom: Animalia
- Phylum: Chordata
- Class: Actinopterygii
- Order: Blenniiformes
- Family: Tripterygiidae
- Subfamily: Tripterygiinae
- Genus: Cryptichthys
- Species: C. jojettae

Binomial name
- Cryptichthys jojettae Hardy, 1987

= Cryptic triplefin =

Species of fish

The cryptic triplefin (Cryptichthys jojettae) is a species of triplefin in the family Tripterygiidae. It is found around the coast of New Zealand and is the only member of the monotypic genus Cryptichthys. It length is up to 6 cm. The specific name honours a former staff member at the National Museum of New Zealand, Jojette Drost, who participated in collecting specimens with Hardy.
