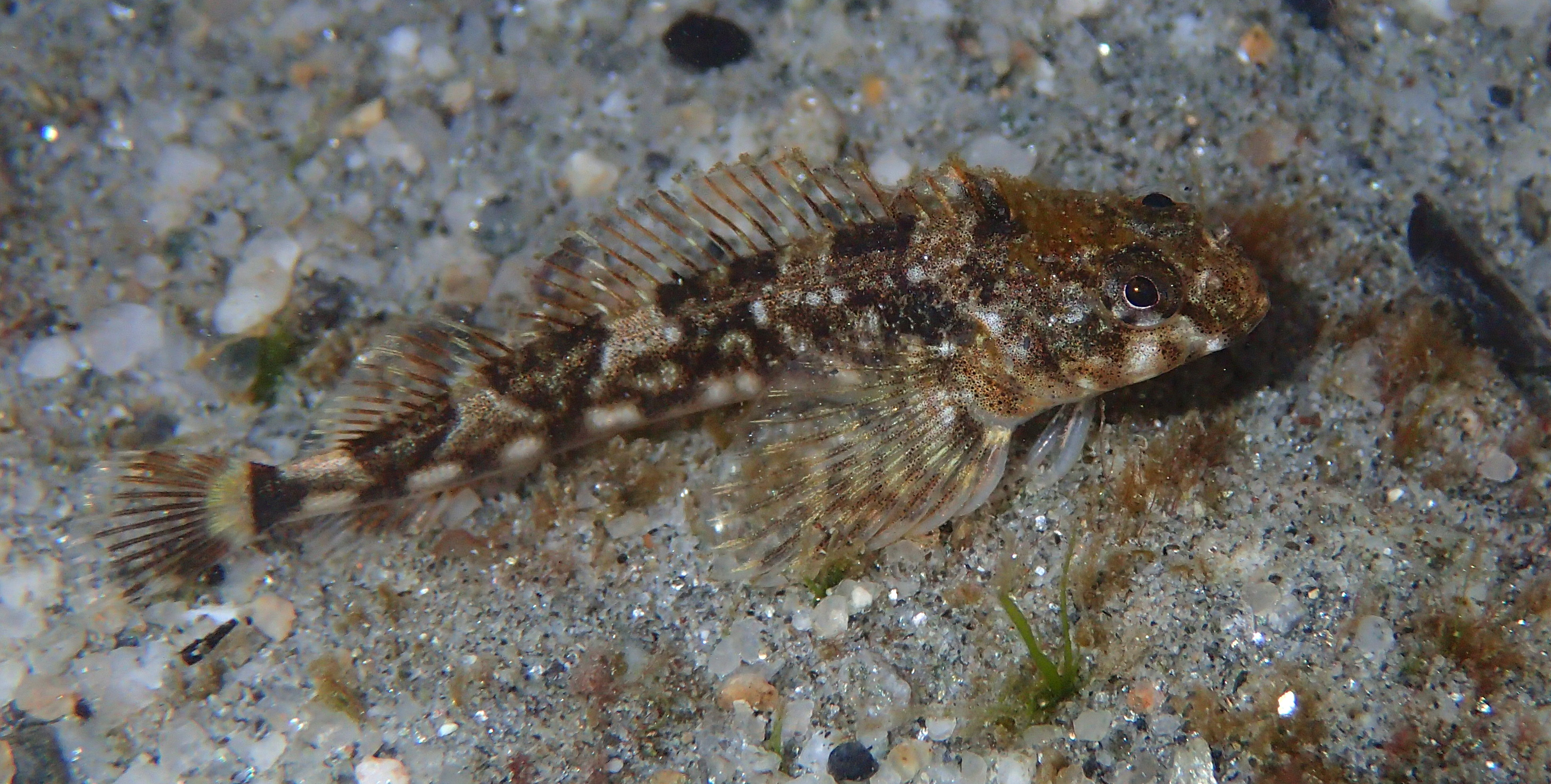

Conservation status
- Least Concern (IUCN 3.1)

Scientific classification
- Kingdom: Animalia
- Phylum: Chordata
- Class: Actinopterygii
- Order: Blenniiformes
- Family: Tripterygiidae
- Subfamily: Tripterygiinae
- Genus: Blennodon; Hardy, 1987
- Species: B. dorsale

Binomial name
- Blennodon dorsale (Clarke, 1879)

Synonyms
- Trypterygion dorsale Clark, 1879

= Giant triplefin =

Species of fish

The giant triplefin (Blennodon dorsale) is a triplefin of the family Tripterygiidae, the only member of the genus Blennodon, found around the coast of New Zealand. It length is up to 15 cm, and it is the largest known triplefin species.
