= Southern barred triplefin =

Conservation status
- Least Concern (IUCN 3.1)

Scientific classification
- Kingdom: Animalia
- Phylum: Chordata
- Class: Actinopterygii
- Order: Blenniiformes
- Family: Tripterygiidae
- Subfamily: Notoclininae
- Genus: Brachynectes
- Species: B. fasciatus

Binomial name
- Brachynectes fasciatus Scott, 1957

Species of fish

The southern barred triplefin, Brachynectes fasciatus, is a triplefin of the family Tripterygiidae and only member of the genus Brachynectes, found around Australia's south coast including Tasmania at depths down to 13 m. Its length is only up to about 41 mm.

The southern barred triplefin is found in rock pools and amongst seagrass beds.
