= Matanui =

Scientific classification
- Kingdom: Animalia
- Phylum: Chordata
- Class: Actinopterygii
- Order: Blenniiformes
- Family: Tripterygiidae
- Subfamily: Tripterygiinae
- Genus: Matanui; Jawad & Clements, 2004

Type species
- Forsterygion bathytaton Hardy, 1989

Genus of fishes

Matanui is a genus of triplefin blennies (family Tripterygiidae), they are endemic to New Zealand.

== Species ==
- Chatham deep-water triplefin, Matanui bathytaton (Hardy, 1989)
- Deepwater triplefin, Matanui profundum (Fricke & Roberts, 1994)

== Etymology ==
The name Matanui is derived from the Māori words mata meaning "eye" and nui meaning "large", a reference to its large eyes.
