= Ceratobregma =

Scientific classification
- Kingdom: Animalia
- Phylum: Chordata
- Class: Actinopterygii
- Order: Blenniiformes
- Family: Tripterygiidae
- Subfamily: Tripterygiinae
- Genus: Ceratobregma; Holleman, 1987

Type species
- Ceratobregma helenae Holleman, 1987

Species
- See text.

Genus of fishes

Ceratobregma is a genus of triplefins in the family Tripterygiidae.

== Species ==
- Spotted spiny-eye triplefin, Ceratobregma acanthops (Whitley, 1964)
- Helen's triplefin, Ceratobregma helenae Holleman, 1987
