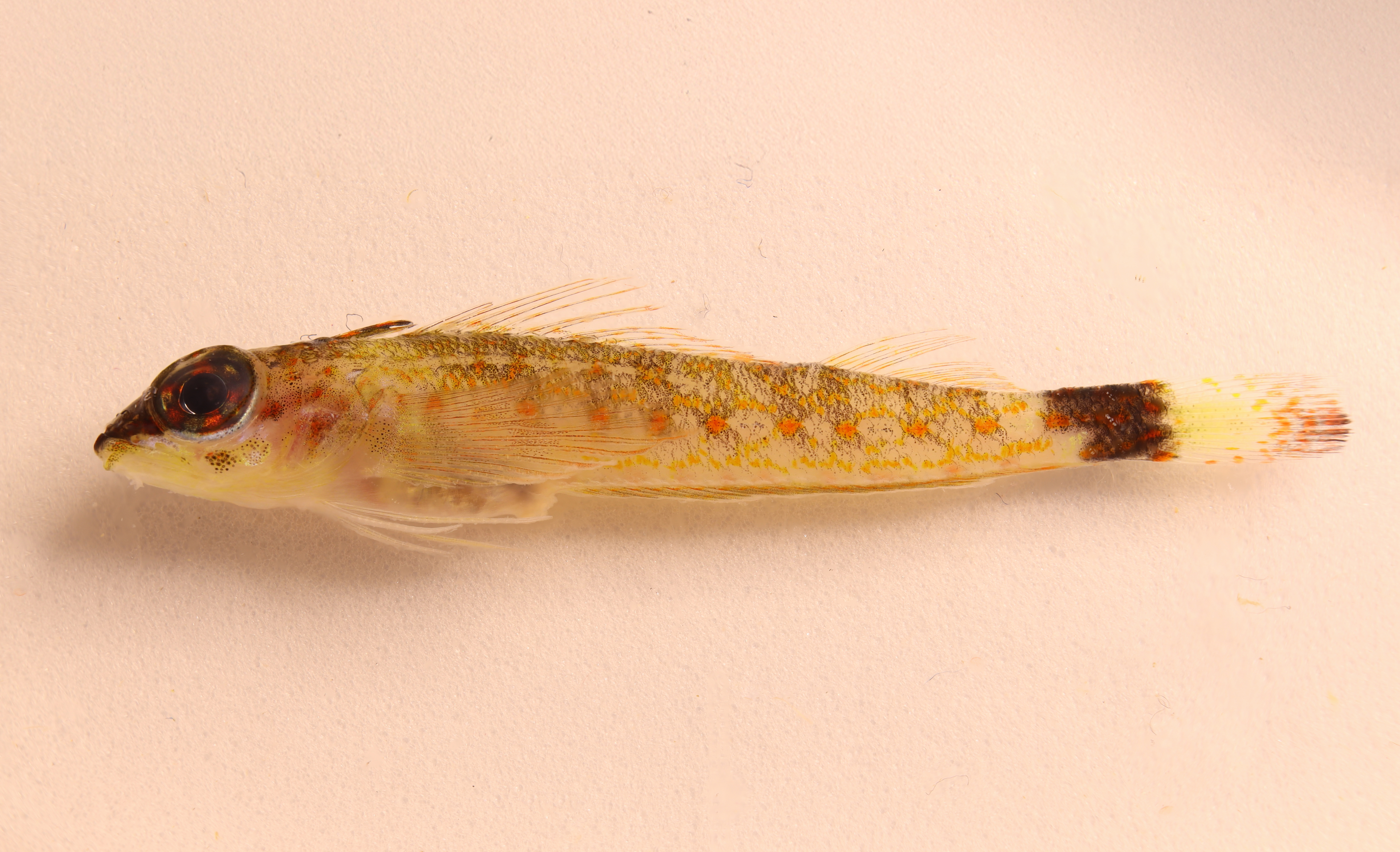
- Lizard Triplefin from Bahía de los Ángeles, photograph taken by Luis M. Jáquez-Domínguez

Conservation status
- Least Concern (IUCN 3.1)

Scientific classification
- Kingdom: Animalia
- Phylum: Chordata
- Class: Actinopterygii
- Order: Blenniiformes
- Family: Tripterygiidae
- Subfamily: Tripterygiinae
- Genus: Crocodilichthys
- Species: C. gracilis

Binomial name
- Crocodilichthys gracilis Allen & Robertson, 1991

= Lizard triplefin =

Species of fish

The lizard triplefin, Crocodilichthys gracilis, is a fish of the family Tripterygiidae and only member of the genus Crocodilichthys, found in the Gulf of California in the Tropical Eastern Pacific at depths down to 38 m. Its length is only up to about 64 mm. In some regions of the Gulf of California, such as Bahía de los Ángeles, this species is closely associated with microhabitats formed by the coral Porites panamensis, where it can reach average densities of up to 9 individuals per square meter. The body of Crocodilichthys gracilis is pale tan or pinkish, with a dark snout and an iris marked by red and black bars. It features approximately three longitudinal rows of double red-brown spots, with the lowest row separated by white dashes along the midline. A prominent black band, with a white anterior border, encircles the base of the tail and extends onto the fin. The outer part of the tail fin is red, while the central portion is cream-colored.
