= Enneapterygius nigricauda =

Conservation status
- Least Concern (IUCN 3.1)

Scientific classification
- Kingdom: Animalia
- Phylum: Chordata
- Class: Actinopterygii
- Order: Blenniiformes
- Family: Tripterygiidae
- Genus: Enneapterygius
- Species: E. nigricauda

Binomial name
- Enneapterygius nigricauda Fricke, 1997

Species of fish

Enneapterygius nigricauda, known commonly as the blacktail triplefin or the Pacific blacktail triplefin, is a species of triplefin blenny in the genus Enneapterygius. Like all triplefins, it has three dorsal fins. It was described by Ronald Fricke in 1997. It is found in the western Pacific Ocean from the Bonin Islands to Wake Island.

It is not considered a threat to humans and has no known commercial importance.
