= Acanthanectes =

Scientific classification
- Kingdom: Animalia
- Phylum: Chordata
- Class: Actinopterygii
- Order: Blenniiformes
- Family: Tripterygiidae
- Subfamily: Tripterygiinae
- Genus: Acanthanectes; Holleman & Buxton, 1993

Type species
- Acanthanectes hystrix Holleman & Buxton, 1993

Species
- 2, See text.

Genus of fishes

Acanthanectes is a genus of triplefins in the family Tripterygiidae. It contains two described species at present.

== Species ==
- Acanthanectes hystrix Holleman & Buxton, 1993
- Acanthanectes rufus Holleman & Buxton, 1993
