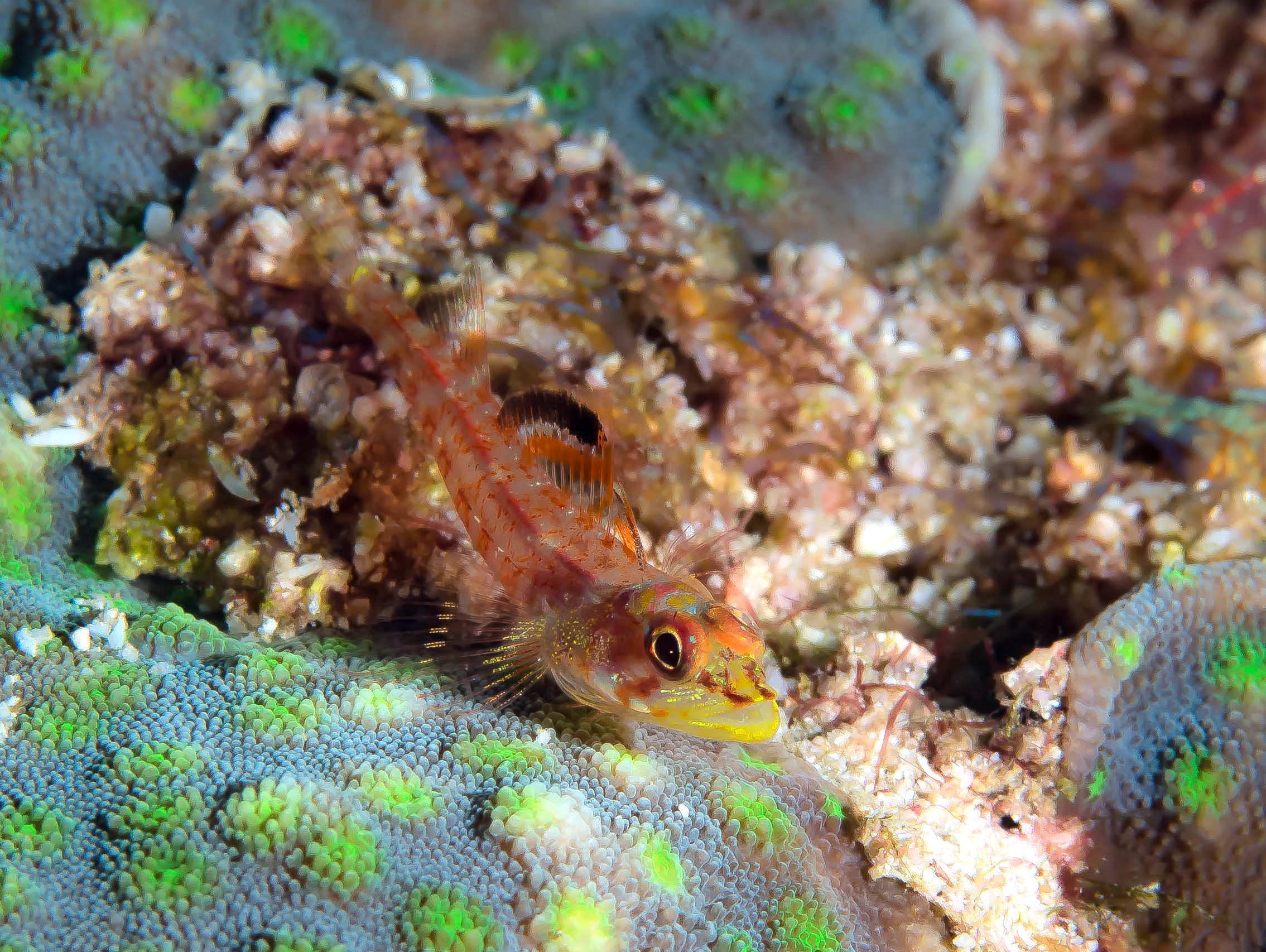

Conservation status
- Least Concern (IUCN 3.1)

Scientific classification
- Kingdom: Animalia
- Phylum: Chordata
- Class: Actinopterygii
- Order: Blenniiformes
- Family: Tripterygiidae
- Genus: Ucla
- Species: U. xenogrammus

Binomial name
- Ucla xenogrammus Holleman, 1993

= Largemouth triplefin =

Species of fish

The largemouth triplefin, Ucla xenogrammus, is a fish of the family Tripterygiidae and only member of the genus Ucla, found in the Pacific Ocean from Vietnam, the Philippines, Palau and the Caroline Islands to Papua New Guinea, Australia (including Christmas Island), and the Solomon Islands, Fiji, Tonga, east to American Samoa and Rapa Iti, at depths of between 2 and 41 metres (6.6 and 134.5 ft). Its length is up to about 47 millimetres (1.9 in). The generic name was coined by ichthyologist Richard Heinrich Rosenblatt in his unpublished dissertation of 1959 from the University of California Los Angeles and it is the initials of that institution, it was formally applied by Holleman in 1993.
