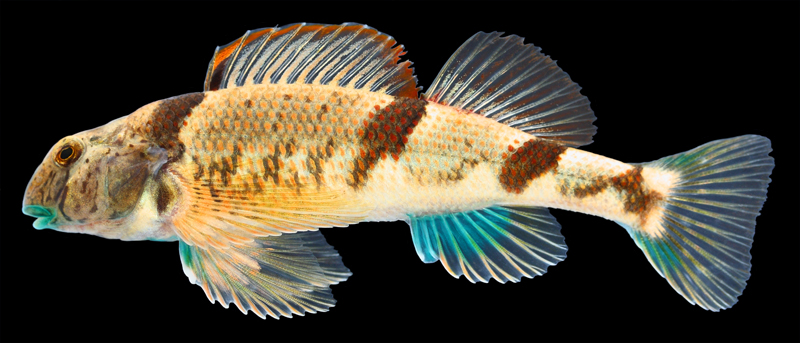

Conservation status
- Least Concern (IUCN 3.1)

Scientific classification
- Kingdom: Animalia
- Phylum: Chordata
- Class: Actinopterygii
- Order: Perciformes
- Family: Percidae
- Genus: Etheostoma
- Species: E. blennius

Binomial name
- Etheostoma blennius C. H. Gilbert & Swain, 1887

= Blenny darter =

Species of fish

The blenny darter (Etheostoma blennius) is a species of freshwater ray-finned fish, a darter from the subfamily Etheostomatinae, part of the family Percidae, which also contains the perches, ruffes and pikeperches. It is a poorly known species which occurs in Alabama and Tennessee where it inhabits swift riffles.

== Description ==
The blenny darter is a moderately-sized but rather robust darter. It has 4 dark saddle like blotches across its back, the anterior blotch being the most distinct and these blotches becoming progressively more indistinct towards the caudal fin. The upper flanks are frequently marked with spots which are occasionally arranged in vertical bars. There is also a series of small partially-fused blotches along the lateral line between the second and fourth saddle blotches. The lower flank is irregularly spotted and the belly is pale. The upper gill cover is dark and contrasts with the pale lower part and cheek. Males have some markings on the breast but females are plain. Males also have a dark margin to the spiny part of the dorsal fin which is not always present in females. The spines in the dorsal fins of female are alternately dark and uncolored whereas all the spines in the males dorsal fin are colorless, the membrane in the dorsal fin being clear in females and spotted in males. The cheek, gill cover and breast are scaleless while the belly and nape are scaled. When spawning the males darken to almost black on the head and the fins become more intensely colored. The maximum published total length is 8.3 centimetres (3.3 in), although around 5.7 centimetres (2.2 in) is more common.

== Distribution ==
The blenny darter is native to the southeastern United States and is found in Alabama and Tennessee, in small to large tributaries of the Tennessee River drainage, more specifically the Buffalo, Duck, and Sequatchie Rivers, and White Oak Creek, Tennessee. The species has a more-limited distribution in Alabama and is restricted to Tennessee River tributaries within the Tennessee Valley of the Highland Rim.

== Habitat and biology ==
The blenny darter's habitat is gravel and rubble riffles in creeks and small to medium rivers which have clear water. They appear to be nocturnal and collecting at night in suitable habitat has obtained many specimens. It most likely uses the riffles to spawn in too. They live for a maximum of two to three years and are sexually mature at one year. It is reproductively active throughout March and April. Mature eggs are orange and translucent. The fish are insectivorous, with analyzed gut contents containing Nematocera larvae, more specifically black fly (Simuliidae) and midge (Chironomidae) larvae. Significant numbers of mayfly (Ephemeroptera) and caddisfly (Trichoptera) nymphs were also found.

== Taxonomy and etymology ==
The blenny darter was first formally described in 1887 by the American zoologists Charles Henry Gilbert (1859–1928) and Joseph Swain (1857–1927) with the type locality given as Cox's Creek and tributary of the Tennessee River near Florence, Alabama.

There are 51 morphological characteristics which were used to indicate that the Swannanoa darter (E. swannanoa) is the blenny darter's closest relative and E. swannanoa is in a clade called the seagreen darter group after the seagreen darter (E. thalassinum)

There are two recognized subspecies:

- E. b. blennius occurs in the Buffalo and Duck Rivers, and White Oak Creek.
- E. b. sequatchiense is limited to Sequatchie River in Tennessee; intergrades between the two subspecies occur throughout their distribution in Alabama and in the Elk River of Tennessee.

The generic name Etheostoma is a compound of the Greek etheo meaning "filter or strain" and stoma meaning "mouth" while the specific name blennius refers to the resemblance of this species to a marine blenny. The subspecific name sequatchiense means "of the Sequatchie River".

== Conservation ==
Herbert T. Boschung and Richard L. Mayden (2004) recommend Etheostoma blennius for Special Concern status in Alabama due to its limited distribution. Much of the area in Alabama where the species occurs is proposed for a number of floodwater-retarding dams, and such structures would greatly degrade the remaining habitat.
