= Enneapterygius rubicauda =

Conservation status
- Least Concern (IUCN 3.1)

Scientific classification
- Kingdom: Animalia
- Phylum: Chordata
- Class: Actinopterygii
- Order: Blenniiformes
- Family: Tripterygiidae
- Genus: Enneapterygius
- Species: E. rubicauda

Binomial name
- Enneapterygius rubicauda Shen, 1994

Species of fish

Enneapterygius rubicauda, the redtail triplefin, is a species of triplefin blenny in the genus Enneapterygius. It was described by Shen Shih-Chieh in 1994. They occur in the western Pacific Ocean, including the Ryukyu and Ogasawara Islands, Taiwan, the Philippines, New Caledonia and Vanuatu.
