= Halfblack triplefin =

Conservation status
- Least Concern (IUCN 3.1)

Scientific classification
- Kingdom: Animalia
- Phylum: Chordata
- Class: Actinopterygii
- Division: Teleostei
- Order: Blenniiformes
- Family: Tripterygiidae
- Genus: Enneapterygius
- Species: E. hemimelas

Binomial name
- Enneapterygius hemimelas (Kner & Steindachner, 1867)

Synonyms
- Tripterygium hemimelas Kner & Steindachner, 1867; Tripterygion hemimelas (Kner & Steindachner, 1867); Enneapterygius fuligicauda Fowler, 1946; Tripterygion fuligicauda (Fowler, 1946); Enneapterygius macrobrachium Fowler, 1946; Tripterygion macrobrachium (Fowler, 1946)

Species of fish

The halfblack triplefin (Enneapterygius hemimelas), also known as the half-black triplefin, blackbelly triplefin, or the green-tail threefin, is a species of triplefin blenny in the genus Enneapterygius. It was originally described by R. Kner and F. Steindachner in 1867. It is a non-migratory tropical blenny known from coral reefs in the western Pacific Ocean, and has been described from the Ryukyu Islands to eastern Australia. It has been recorded swimming at a depth range of 0–30 metres (0-98.4 feet).

The halfblack triplefin is described as a "relatively large" member of the Enneapterygius hemimelas species group.
