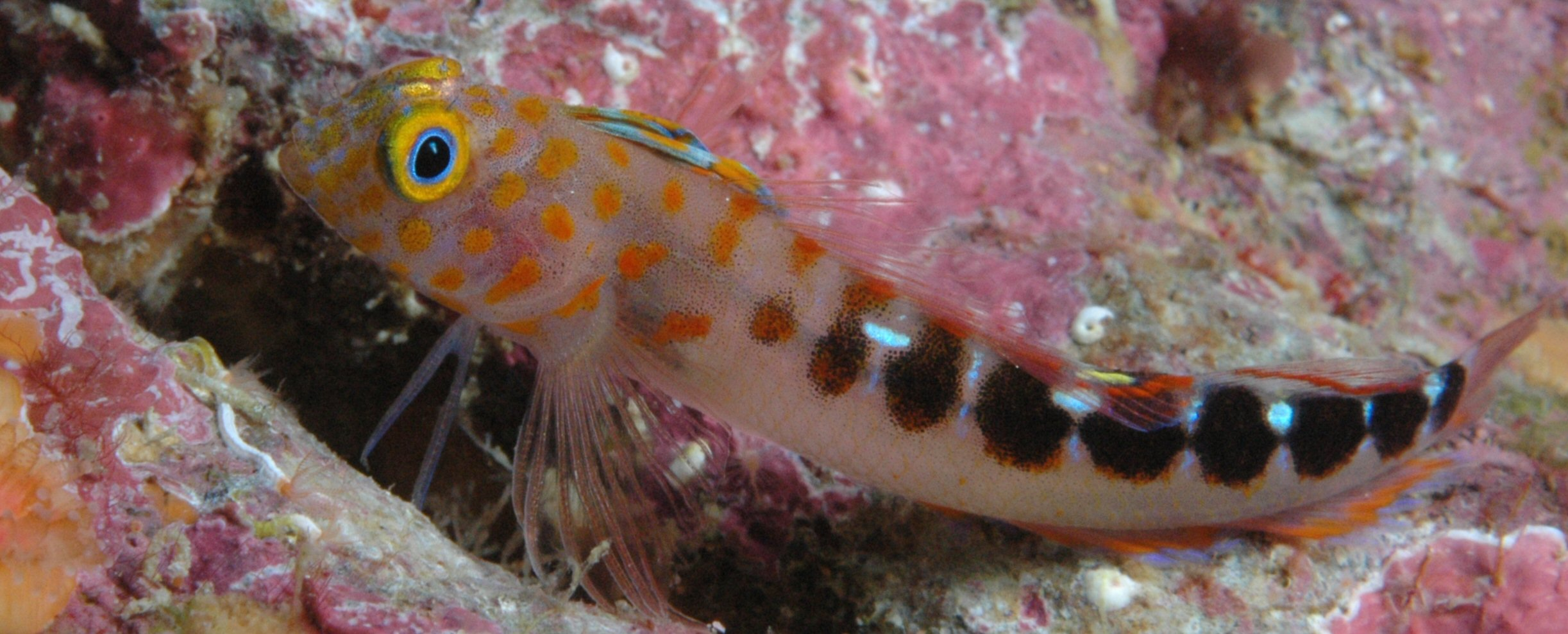
- Blue dot triplefin Notoclinops caerulepunctus

Scientific classification
- Kingdom: Animalia
- Phylum: Chordata
- Class: Actinopterygii
- Order: Blenniiformes
- Suborder: Blennioidei
- Family: Tripterygiidae; Whitley, 1931

Genera
- See text

= Threefin blenny =

Threefin blennies

Family of fishes

Threefin or triplefin blennies are blenniiforms, small percomorph marine fish of the family Tripterygiidae. Found in tropical and temperate waters of the Atlantic, Pacific and Indian Oceans, the family contains about 150 species in 30 genera. The family name derives from the Greek tripteros meaning "with three wings".

With an elongated, typical blenny form, threefin blennies differ from their relatives by having a dorsal fin separated into three parts (hence the name); the first two are spinous. The small, slender pelvic fins are located underneath the throat and possess a single spine; the large anal fin may have one or two spines. The pectoral fins are greatly enlarged, and the tail fin is rounded. The New Zealand topknot, Notoclinus fenestratus, is the largest species at 20 cm in total length; most other species do not exceed 6 cm.

Many threefin blennies are brightly coloured, often for reasons of camouflage; these species are popular in the aquarium hobby. As demersal fish, threefin blennies spend most of their time on or near the bottom on coral and rocks. The fish are typically found in shallow, clear waters with sun exposure, such as lagoons and seaward reefs; nervous fish, they retreat to rock crevices at any perceived threat.

Threefin blennies are diurnal and territorial; many species exhibit sexual dichromatism, with the females drab compared to the males. The second dorsal fin is also extended in the males of some species. Small invertebrates comprise the bulk of the threefin blenny diet.

== Genera ==
FishBase lists about 150 species in 30 genera:

- Subfamily Notoclininae Fricke, 2009
  - Brachynectes Scott, 1957
  - Notoclinus Gill, 1893
- Subfamily Tripterygiinae Whitley, 1931
- Acanthanectes Holleman & Buxton, 1993
- Apopterygion Kuiter, 1986
- Axoclinus Fowler, 1944
- Bellapiscis Hardy, 1987
- Blennodon Hardy, 1987
- Ceratobregma Holleman, 1987

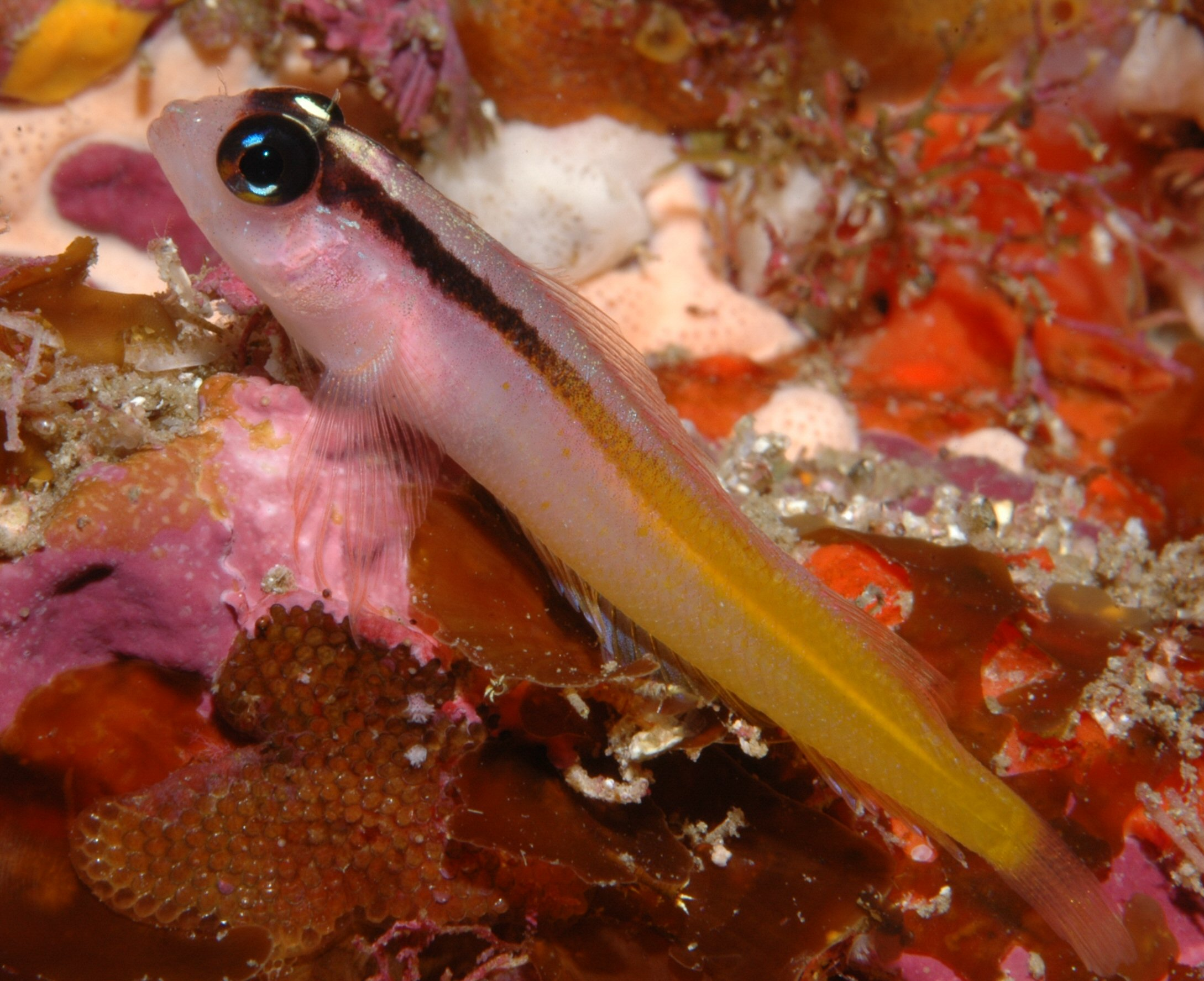
Yellow-and-black triplefin Forsterygion flavonigrum

- Cremnochorites Holleman, 1982
- Crocodilichthys Allen & Robertson, 1991
- Cryptichthys Hardy, 1987
- Enneanectes D.S. Jordan & Evermann, 1895
- Enneapterygius Rüppell, 1835
- Forsterygion Whitley & Phillipps, 1939
- Gilloblennius Whitley & Phillipps, 1939
- Helcogramma McCulloch & Waite, 1918
- Helcogrammoides Rosenblatt, 1990
- Karalepis Hardy, 1984
- Lepidoblennius Steindachner, 1867
- Lepidonectes Bussing, 1991
- Matanui Jawad & Clements, 2004
- Norfolkia Fowler, 1953
- Notoclinops Whitley, 1930

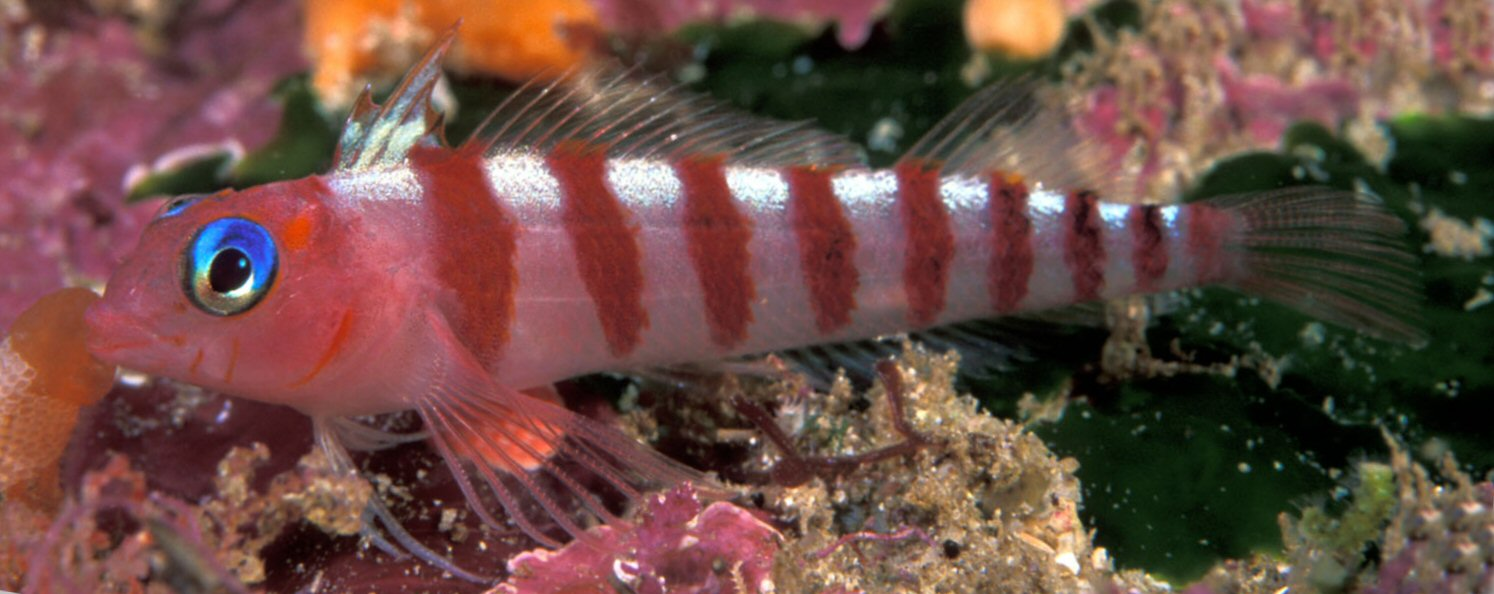
Blue-eyed triplefin Notoclinops segmentatus

- Ruanoho Hardy, 1986
- Springerichthys Shen, 1994
- Trianectes McCulloch & Waite, 1918
- Trinorfolkia Fricke, 1994
- Tripterygion Risso, 1827
- Ucla Holleman, 1993
