= Blackbelly triplefin =

Conservation status
- Least Concern (IUCN 3.1)

Scientific classification
- Kingdom: Animalia
- Phylum: Chordata
- Class: Actinopterygii
- Division: Teleostei
- Order: Blenniiformes
- Family: Tripterygiidae
- Genus: Enneapterygius
- Species: E. fuscoventer

Binomial name
- Enneapterygius fuscoventer Fricke, 1997

Species of fish

The blackbelly triplefin (Enneapterygius fuscoventer) is a species of triplefin blenny in the genus Enneapterygius, described by German ichthyologist Ronald Fricke in 1997 and known from the western Pacific Ocean.

== Etymology ==
The blackbelly triplefin was described by Ronald Fricke in 1997, from a male holotype (USNM 259131) and other specimens. The specific name "fuscoventer" combines the Latin words fuscus (dark) and venter (belly), and refers to the dark colouring on the stomachs of male specimens.

== Description ==
Fricke described Enneapterygius fuscoventer as a medium-sized member of the Enneapterygius pyramis species group, which also contains the Lord Howe Island triplefin (E. howensis), the Kermadec triplefin (E. kermadecensis), the Henderson triplefin (E. ornatus), the pyramid triplefin (E. pyramis), and the Rapa triplefin (E. randalli). Male blackbelly triplefins can reach a maximum length of 2.3 centimetres (0.91 inches). Under alcohol, the males have a yellow forehead, a black face with dark gray eyes, a blue line beneath each eye, a mostly brown body with black fins and black streaks in the shape of pyramids on the belly.

== Distribution ==
The blackbelly triplefin is a tropical blenny known from reefs in the western Pacific Ocean, and has been described from the Philippines, Taiwan, Papua New Guinea, the Society Islands, American Samoa, and Fiji. It has been recorded swimming at a depth range of 0–5 metres (0-13.1 feet).
