= UTC−08:00 =

Time zone

- Time zone
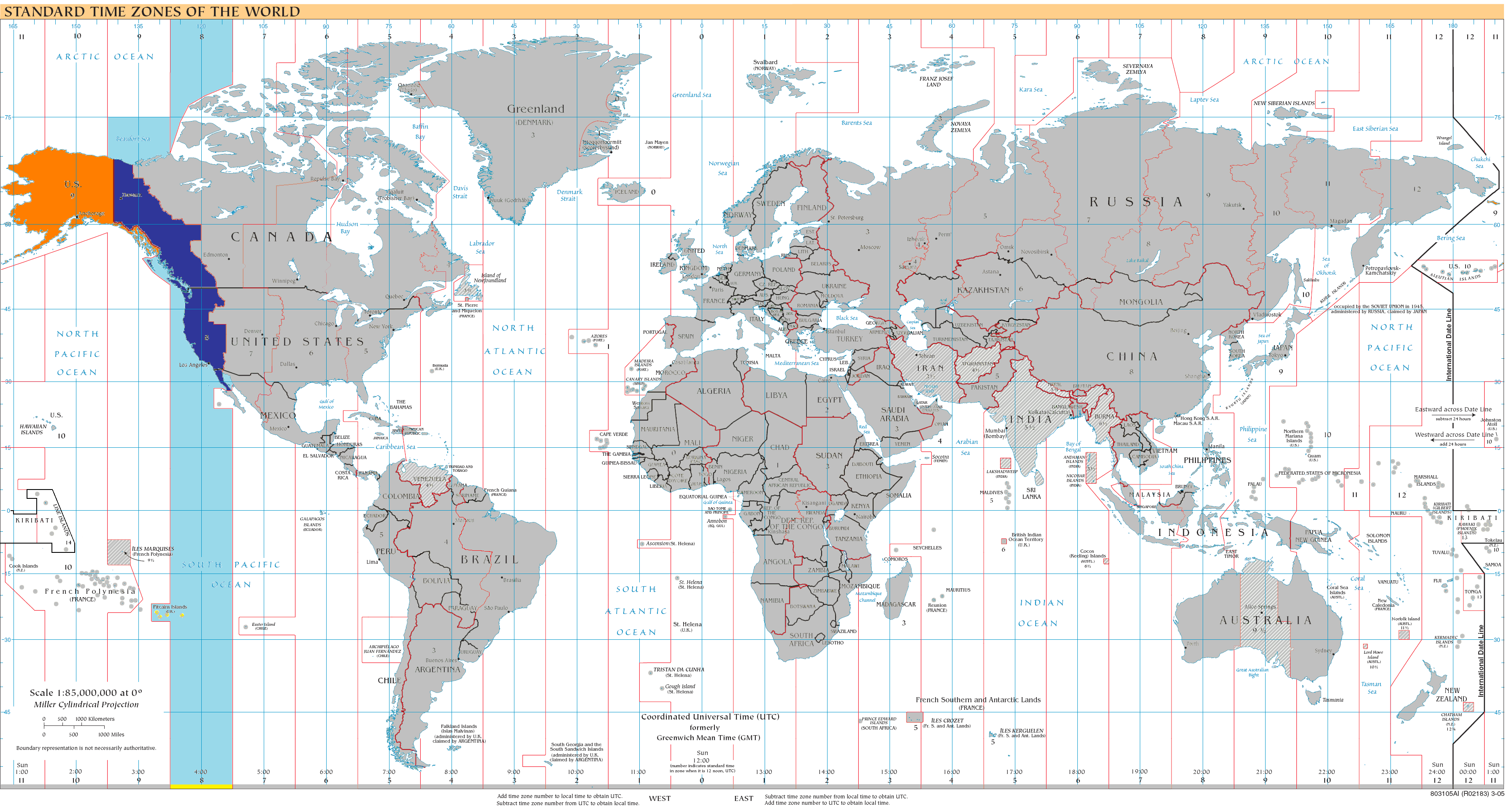
- World map with the time zone highlighted

UTC offset
- UTC: UTC−08:00

Current time
- 08:14, 8 March 2026 UTC−08:00 [refresh]

Central meridian
- 120 degrees W

Date-time group
- U

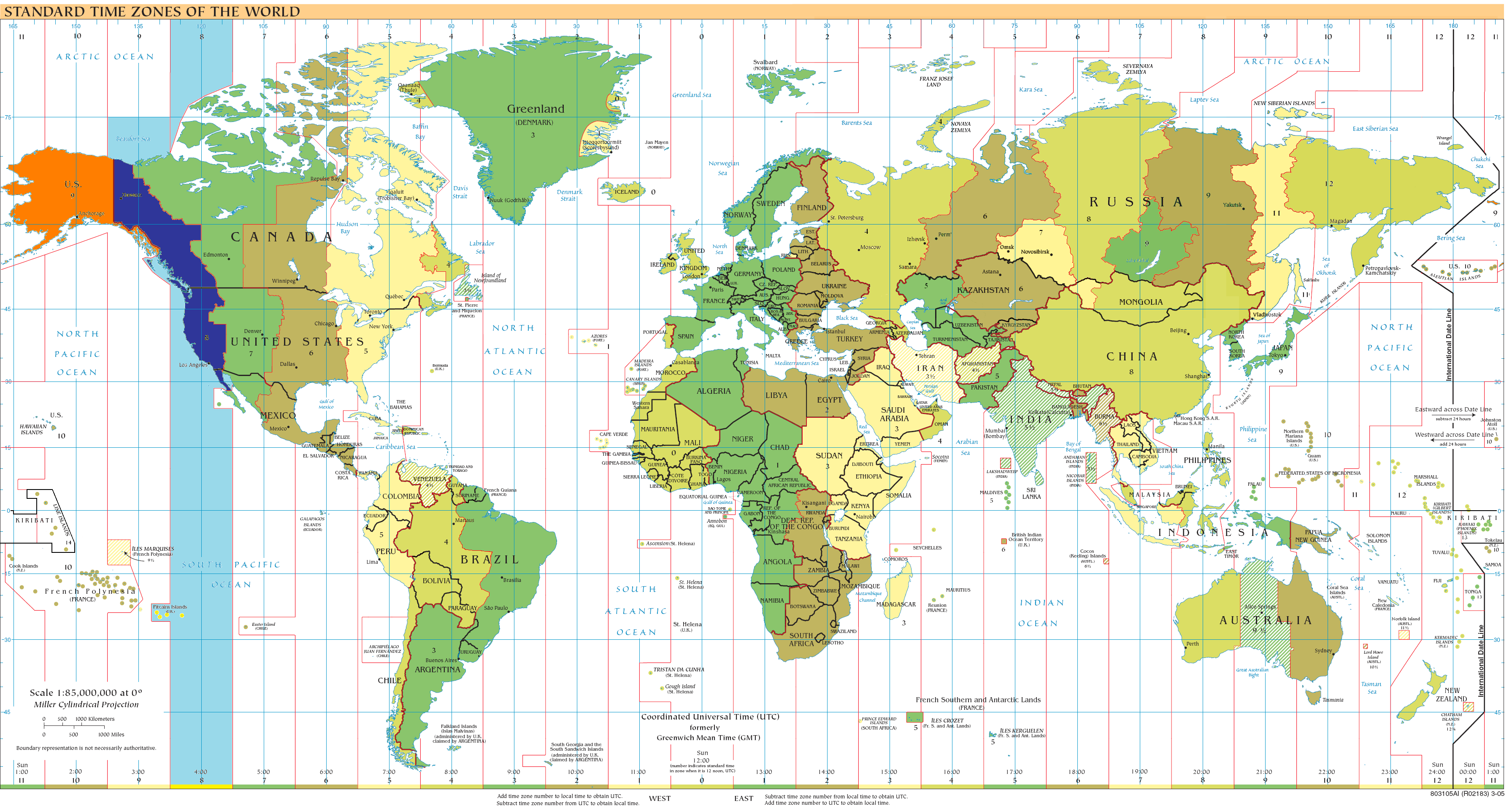
UTC−08:00: blue (January), orange (July), yellow (year-round), light blue (sea areas)

Time in Mexico: Mexican time zone / Standard / DST / U.S. equivalent; Zona Sureste / UTC−05:00 / / Eastern Standard Time; Zona Centro / UTC−06:00 / UTC−05:00 / Central Time; Zona Centro / UTC−06:00 / / Central Standard Time; Zona Pacífico / UTC−07:00 / UTC−06:00 / Mountain Time; Zona Pacífico / UTC−07:00 / / Mountain Standard Time; Zona Noroeste / UTC−08:00 / UTC−07:00 / Pacific Time

UTC−08:00 is an identifier for a time offset from UTC of −08:00. This time is used:

== As standard time (Northern Hemisphere winter) ==
Principal cities: Seattle, Portland, San Francisco, Los Angeles, San Diego, Sacramento, Las Vegas, Tijuana

=== North America ===
- Mexico
  - Baja California
- United States (Pacific Time Zone)
  - California
  - Idaho
    - North of Salmon River
  - Nevada (except West Wendover)
  - Oregon
    - All of the state except Malheur County (but including a small strip in the south of Malheur)
  - Washington

== As daylight saving time (Northern Hemisphere summer) ==
Principal city: Anchorage

=== North America ===
- United States (Alaska Time Zone)
  - Alaska
    - Except Aleutian Islands west of 169.30°W

== As standard time (year-round) ==
Principal settlement: Adamstown

=== Oceania ===
==== Pacific Ocean ====
===== Polynesia =====
- France
  - Clipperton Island
- United Kingdom
  - Pitcairn Islands
    - Ducie Island
    - Oeno Island
    - Henderson Island

== See also ==
- Effects of time zones on North American broadcasting
- Time in Canada
- Time in France
- Time in Mexico
- Time in the United States
- Time in the United Kingdom
