= 2001 Pitcairnese tourism referendum =

Referendum in the Pitcairn Islands

A referendum on tourism development was held in the Pitcairn Islands in March 2001. The proposals put forward by Wellesley Pacific were approved by 78% of voters.

== Background ==
A referendum was held in 1981 on the subject of building an airfield for the island. Although it was approved by 90% of voters, construction had proved too expensive.

Wellesley Pacific proposed the construction of a 30-bed hotel and an international airport on Oeno Island, with regular flights to Tahiti and New Zealand. A second airport would be built on Pitcairn island with two lodges, whilst Bounty Bay would be modified to allow boats to land. A processing plant would also be built to allow the development of a fishing industry. The company demanded exclusive rights to develop the islands, but said it would give 10% of profits to island residents. However, environmentalists raised concerns about the potential effects on the islands' unique plant and animal life.

== Results ==
Choice	Votes	%
For	22	78.57
Against	6	21.43
Total	28	100
Source: The Observer
