= Crough Seamount =

Seamount in the Pacific Ocean, within the exclusive economic zone of Pitcairn

Coordinates: 25°S 121.2°W

Crough Seamount

Crough Seamount (named after the geologist Thomas Crough) is a seamount in the Pacific Ocean, within the exclusive economic zone of Pitcairn. It rises to a depth of 650 metres (2,130 ft) and is paired with a taller but overall smaller seamount to the east. This seamount has a flat top and probably formed an island in the past. It is about 7-8 million years old, although a large earthquake recorded at its position in 1955 may indicate a recent eruption.

The seamount appears to be part of a long geological lineament with the neighbouring Henderson and Ducie islands, as well as the southern Tuamotus and Line Islands. Such a lineament may have been generated by a hotspot; the nearby Easter hotspot is a candidate hotspot.

== Geology and geomorphology ==
=== Regional ===
The region lies between and around the islands of Pitcairn and Easter Island. There, the East Pacific Rise is interrupted by a trapezoid microplate known as the Easter Microplate about 400 kilometres (250 mi) wide. Seafloor spreading occurs at a rate of about 16 centimetres per year (6.3 in/year).

There is a topographic swell that connects the two islands and continues eastward towards Sala y Gomez. The origin of this swell and the various volcanoes and seamounts associated with it has been variously explained as either being due to a mantle plume which forms volcanoes that are then carried away through plate motion or by a "hot line" where a number of simultaneously active volcanic centres develop. This geological lineament may extend all the way to Tonga.

Crough seamount was probably formed by the Easter hotspot that also generated Easter Island albeit with the participation of a nearby fracture zone that modified the trend of the hotspot path. In this case the Easter Island-Sala y Gomez ridge and the Crough Seamount would be conjugate volcanic ridges paired across the East Pacific Rise. although it is possible that two separate hotspots were active on the eastern and western side of the East Pacific Rise. Another theory postulates that Crough was formed by its own hotspot, the Crough hotspot.

Together with Ducie and Henderson Crough forms a 1,300 kilometres (810 mi) long westward trending lineament with each volcano becoming older the farther west it lies, and which may be a prolongation of the southern Tuamotus which were generated by the same hotspot. Even farther west the hotspot track may include Oeno, Minerve Reef, Marutea, Acton, Rangiroa, the Line Islands and the Mid-Pacific Mountains, although a continuation through the Line Islands is problematic if it is assumed that the Easter hotspot generated this track. A different theory has Crough seamount as its own hotspot, that formed the seamounts and islands together with another hotspot ("Larson"), and lesser contributions of the Society and Marquesas hotspot. East of Crough, a series of even younger volcanic ridges continues until the East Pacific Rise where the hotspot may be located. The Crough hotspot may be a conjugate of the Easter hotspot, and sourced from the middle mantle.

=== Local ===
Crough is an east–west trending seamount which rises over 2 kilometres (1.2 mi) from the seafloor to a depth of less than 722 metres (2,369 ft) at 650 metres (2,130 ft). It has a flat top and the presence of coral sands indicates that Crough once emerged above sea level before subsiding to its present depth, having formerly hosted corals and pteropods. Wave erosion that took place when Crough emerged above sea level truncated the seamount, turning it into a flat guyot. Pillow lavas crop out between 1,400–950 metres (4,590–3,120 ft). Crough Seamount has a volume of 660 cubic kilometres (160 cu mi), comparable to that of other submarine volcanoes such as Macdonald seamount, Mehetia and Moua Pihaa.

A second seamount lies nearby and partly overlaps with Crough, it is named Thomas Seamount in honour of a geophysicist. This seamount is even shallower than Crough as it reaches a depth of 600 metres (2,000 ft) but has a smaller volume of 600 cubic kilometres (140 cu mi). Both seamounts are situated at the ends of volcanic ridges.

== Composition ==
Dredging has yielded both vesicular and porphyritic basalt. Phenocrysts identified include clinopyroxene, olivine and plagioclase. Carbonates and hyaloclastites have also been found, and some samples were covered with manganese crusts and palagonite. Hydrothermal iron crusts have also been found. There are some similarities between the Crough magmas and Easter Island magmas.

== Eruption history ==
Argon-argon dating has yielded ages of 8.4 to 7.6 million years ago for samples dredged from Crough, while other geological indicators suggest an age of between 7 and 10 million years ago. Other estimates of its age are 4-3 million years.

In 1955, a strong earthquake was recorded on the northern flank of Crough Seamount; the characteristics of the earthquake resemble these of volcanic processes and it is thus possible that Crough Seamount is still active. Such activity may constitute a post-shield stage of volcanism. The earthquake has also been interpreted as a normal fault earthquake which sometimes occur in young oceanic crust, but the 1955 Crough event was considerably stronger than other earthquakes of this type.
