= Oeno (disambiguation) =

Oeno may refer to:

- Oenotropae, the three daughters of Anius and Dryope from Greek mythology
- Oeno Island, an uninhabited coral atoll in the South Pacific Ocean
- Oeno (ship), nineteenth-century Pacific whaler
