= Raised coral atoll =

Atoll raised well above sea level

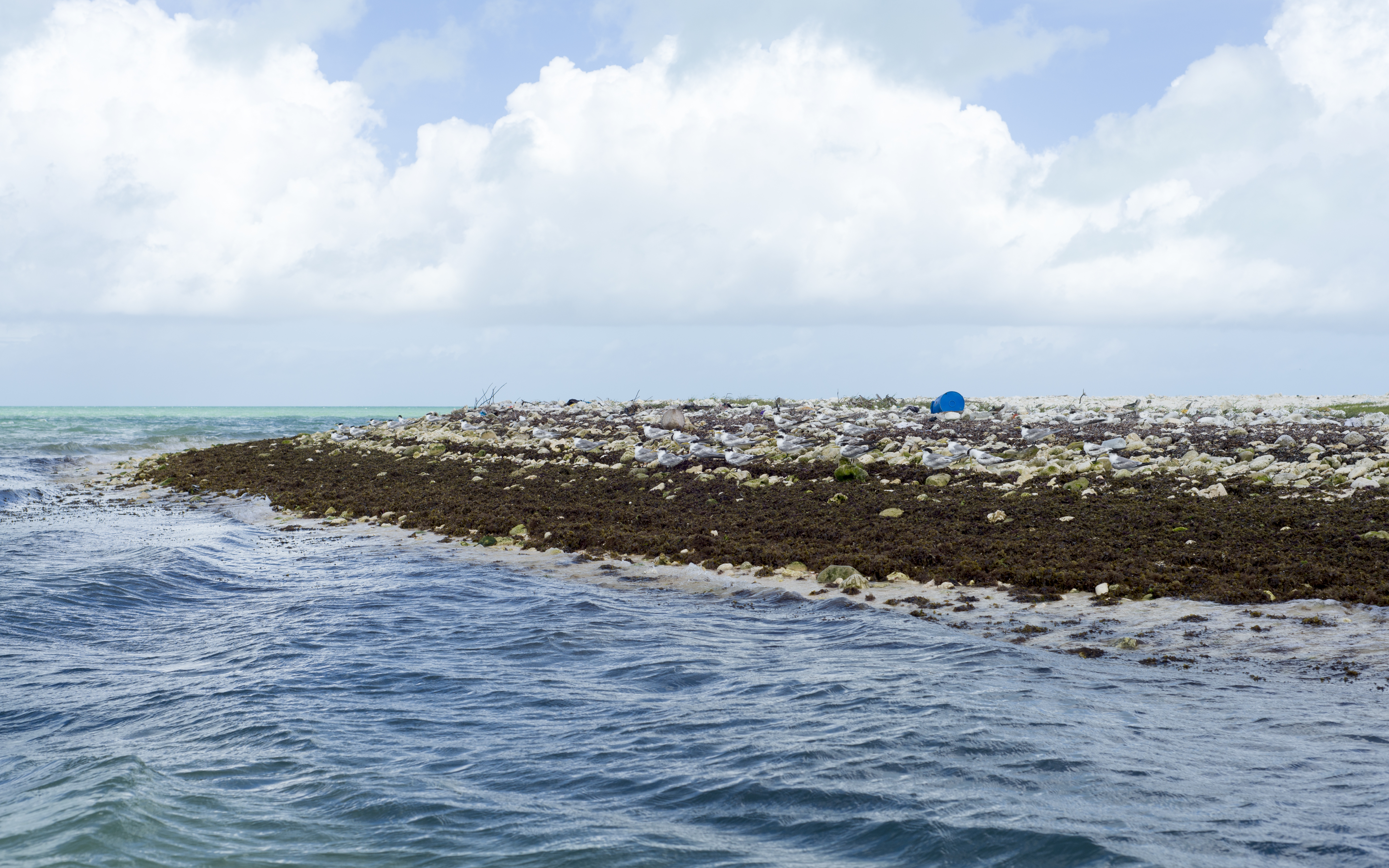
Kiritimati (Christmas Island), a raised coral atoll in the Pacific Ocean

A raised coral atoll or uplifted coral atoll is an atoll that has been lifted high enough above sea level by tectonic forces, protecting it from scouring by storms and enabling soils and diverse – often endemic – species of flora and fauna to develop. With the exception of Aldabra in the Indian Ocean and Henderson Island in the Pacific Ocean, most tropical raised atolls have been dramatically altered by human activities such as species introduction, phosphate mining, and even bomb testing.

== Notable raised coral atolls ==
- Aldabra
- Banaba
- Daitō Islands
- Henderson Island
- Kiritimati
- Lifou
- Makatea
- Nauru
