= Ducie Island =

Atoll in the Pitcairn Islands, British Overseas Territories

Ducie
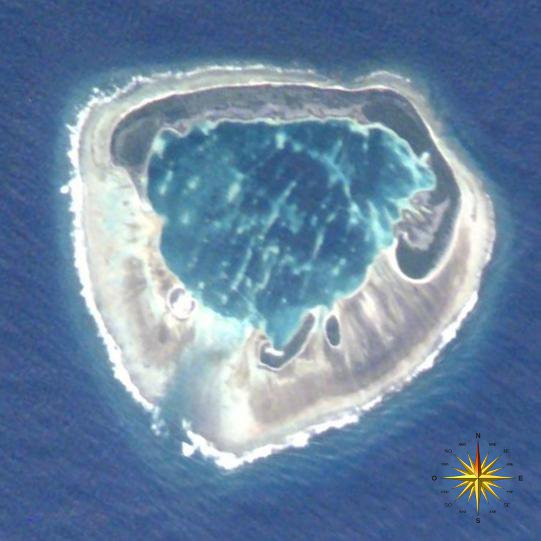
- NASA photograph of Ducie Island
- Interactive map of Ducie

Geography
- Location: South Pacific Ocean
- Coordinates: 24°40′09″S 124°47′11″W
- Archipelago: Pitcairn Islands
- Total islands: 4
- Major islands: Acadia, Pandora, Edwards, Westward
- Highest elevation: 15 ft (4.6 m)

Administration
- Pitcairn Islands (British Overseas Territory)

Location of Ducie Atoll in the Pacific Ocean

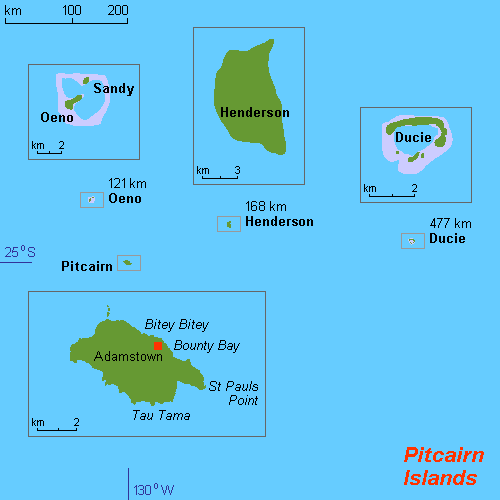
Location of Ducie Atoll within Pitcairn Islands

Ducie Island (/ˈduːsi/; Pitkern: Ducie Ailen) is an uninhabited atoll in the Pitcairn Islands group, which also includes Pitcairn, Henderson and Oeno islands. Ducie lies east of Pitcairn Island, and east of Henderson Island, and has a total area of 1.5 square miles (3.9 km^{2}), which includes the lagoon. It is 1.5 miles (2.4 km) long, measured northeast to southwest, and about 1 mile (1.6 km) wide. The island is composed of four islets: Acadia, Pandora, Westward and Edwards.

Despite its sparse vegetation, the atoll is known as the breeding ground of a number of bird species. More than 90% of the world population of Murphy's petrel nests on Ducie, while pairs of red-tailed tropicbirds and fairy terns make around 1% of the world population for each species.

Ducie was first discovered in 1606 by Pedro Fernandes de Queiros, who named it Luna Puesta, and rediscovered by Edward Edwards, captain of HMS Pandora, who was sent in 1790 to capture the mutineers of HMS Bounty. He named the island Ducie in honour of Francis Reynolds-Moreton, 3rd Baron Ducie. In 1867, a claim on the island was made under the United States's Guano Islands Act, but the claim was never bonded. The United Kingdom annexed the island on 19 December 1902 as part of the Pitcairn Islands. Due to its inaccessibility and the distance from Pitcairn, Ducie is rarely visited, receiving one or two visits a year from cruise ships.

== History ==
The island was discovered by a Spanish expedition led by Portuguese sailor Pedro Fernandes de Queirós on 26 January 1606, during an expedition that began in Callao, Peru. Supported by Pope Clement VIII and Philip III of Spain, Queirós was given the command of the San Pedro, San Pablo and Zabra. The fleet was nicknamed Los Tres Reyes Magos ("The Three Wise Men"). The objective of the expedition was to take soldiers, friars and provisions to establish a colony in the Santa Cruz Islands.

Ducie Island was the first of eighteen discoveries on the trip. Queirós named the island Luna Puesta (roughly, "moon that has set"). On the same day, he also sighted two more islands, one that he named San Juan Bautista ("St John the Baptist"), and the other La Encarnación ("the Incarnation"). It is unclear which one was Henderson island and which one was Pitcairn. The confusion was later compounded when a chart produced by Admiral José de Espinosa marked Ducie as La Encarnación, rather than as Luna Puesta.

The island was rediscovered and named Ducie Island on 16 March 1791 by Captain Edward Edwards, of HMS Pandora, who had been despatched from Britain in 1790 to arrest the Bounty mutineers. Edwards named it in honour of Francis Reynolds-Moreton, 3rd Baron Ducie, under whom he had served earlier in his career. HMS Pandora turned northwards from Ducie and, because of this change of course, Edwards did not sight the other islands of the group. If HMS Pandora had maintained its course, it would eventually have reached Pitcairn Island and found the Bounty mutineers.

The crew of the whaleship Essex, which a whale had attacked and sunk in November 1820, mistakenly believed that they had reached Ducie after a month at sea in two whaleboats. In fact they had reached Henderson Island. Captain Thomas Raine of Surrey, who was searching for the survivors of Essex, in 1820 made the first recorded landing on Ducie. Frederick William Beechey, who arrived in HMS Blossom during November 1825, wrote the first comprehensive description of the island. Beechey's expedition did not land in the atoll, but members of the crew sailed around it in small boats. Based on Beechey's survey, the first Admiralty chart of the island was published in 1826. For nearly a hundred years it was the only available map of the island. It was during Beechey's survey of the island that a lone whaleboat containing four human skeletons was located. Though he could not prove it, Beechey suspected they belonged to Essex's missing crew, thus making the bodies those of Boatsteerer Obed Hendricks (20), Seaman Joseph West and Steward William Bond. All of whom were last seen alive by Captain Pollard and his whaleboat before being separated in a squall on January 29. The identity of the fourth body is unascertainable, but is theorized to be that of Seaman Isaiah Sheppard as he was the last person to die before Hendricks' boat was separated from Pollard.

In March 1867, John Daggett filed a claim on Ducie Island (referring to it as 'Ducer Island') with the U.S. State Department under the Guano Islands Act. Daggett was instructed to provide further information, including to affidavits of the quality and quantity of guano present on the island; however, according to a 1933 State Department report, Daggett never provided the additional information and the claim was never accepted by the United States.

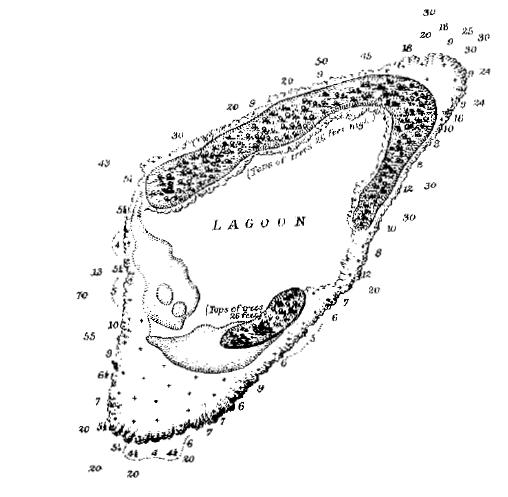
Map of Ducie island published in 1826, based on the descriptions of Frederick William Beechey

On 5 June 1881, the mail ship Acadia ran aground on the island while returning from San Francisco, Peru, after having unloaded its cargo. On the way to Queenstown or Falmouth for new orders, Master Stephen George calculated a route passing 15 to 20 miles (24 to 32 km) to the east of Ducie. George left the first mate in command at 6 am. Half an hour later, the first mate saw a white line, which he disregarded on the assumption that it was phosphorescence in the water. Later, realising that it was land, he manoeuvred to avoid running aground, but failed. The look-out excused himself by saying that he thought that the white land was a cloud. The crew made several unsuccessful attempts to re-float the ship, after which the master sailed one of the ship's boats to Pitcairn Island. He was assisted there by the local inhabitants and returned aboard the Edward O’Brien, an American boat, to rescue the rest of the crew. The incident was later investigated in a court in Liverpool, where the ultimate cause of the wreck was left undetermined, though possible causes included a calculation error by the master or an unknown current that carried the ship to the island. The court declared the master not guilty of any wrongdoing. A stone marker with a memorial inscription is located at the landing point on Acadia Islet. It was unveiled to commemorate the recovery of the anchor in 1990. The wreck lies offshore from the memorial stone in about 10 metres of water.

In 1969, the atoll was proposed as an "Island for Science", and was later recommended as a Ramsar Site. Major expeditions that came to the island to record its biota include the Whitney South Seas Expedition in 1922, the National Geographic Society-Oceanic Institute Expedition to Southeast Oceania of 1970–71 and the Smithsonian expedition of 1975. More recent expeditions include the MV Rambler Expedition by the Smithsonian in 1987, one by Raleigh International in the same year, the Sir Peter Scott Commemorative Expedition to the Pitcairn Islands of 1991–1992 (aka The Pitcairn Islands Scientific Expedition), In 2012, National Geographic Explorer-in-Residence Enric Sala produced Sharks of Lost Island including Ducie and all the Pitcairn Islands. Because of its inaccessibility, Ducie is rarely approached, but cruise ships make one or two landings per year. Ducie was the object of a temporary CB radio QSL station in 2018 generating over 100,000 contacts. In addition, unrecorded visits are known to be made by freighters and tankers that dump residues in the nearby waters.

=== Sovereignty ===
Although Captain Edward Edwards discovered the atoll in 1791, Ducie was not considered a British possession. In 1867 Ducie was claimed by the United States under the Guano Islands Act, which established that an uninhabited territory with guano deposits could be claimed as a US possession, so long as it was unclaimed by any other country. Despite claims on several other territories, based on various documents such as the Guano Islands Act, neither the United States nor the United Kingdom recognised the sovereignty claimed by each other. Neither of the two considered that the mere discovery of an island was sufficient to claim sovereignty over it, and often a formal act of possession was considered the proper procedure to claim rights over a territory. Ultimately, the United States did not assert its sovereignty over most of its claimed territories.

Under the 1893 Pacific Order in Council, Pitcairn Island was placed under the jurisdiction of the High Commissioner for the Western Pacific, based in Fiji. On 19 December 1902, commissioned by R. T. Simmons, the British Consul in Tahiti, Captain G. F. Jones and a group of Pitcairners visited the nearby islands and annexed them to the United Kingdom. In 1903 Ducie was annexed by the same procedure and placed under the authority of the Western Pacific High Commissioner. R. T. Simmons stated in a dispatch to the Foreign Office that James Russell McCoy had assured him that the islands had always been considered as dependencies of Pitcairn, and that he and other Pitcairners had frequently visited them in the past. This claim is contested by Donald McLoughlin on grounds of the distance between Pitcairn Island and Ducie Island and the lack of a suitable boat to navigate the distance between the two, casting doubt on whether they had ever visited Ducie.

On 4 August 1937, Captain J. W. Rivers-Carnac, commander of HMS Leander, reaffirmed British sovereignty over Ducie by hoisting the Union Flag and placing boards proclaiming the island to be the property of King George VI. Ducie was one of several islands thought valuable for potential seaplane bases, though they did not materialise. In 1953, the Pacific Order in Council ceased to have effect and the British Governor of Fiji was appointed Governor of the Pitcairn Islands, which became a separate British colony. A new constitution for the Pitcairn Islands was enacted on 10 February 2010, establishing that Ducie and the rest of the islands are ruled by a governor designated by the British monarch. The governor has a duty to enforce the provisions of the constitution.

== Geography ==
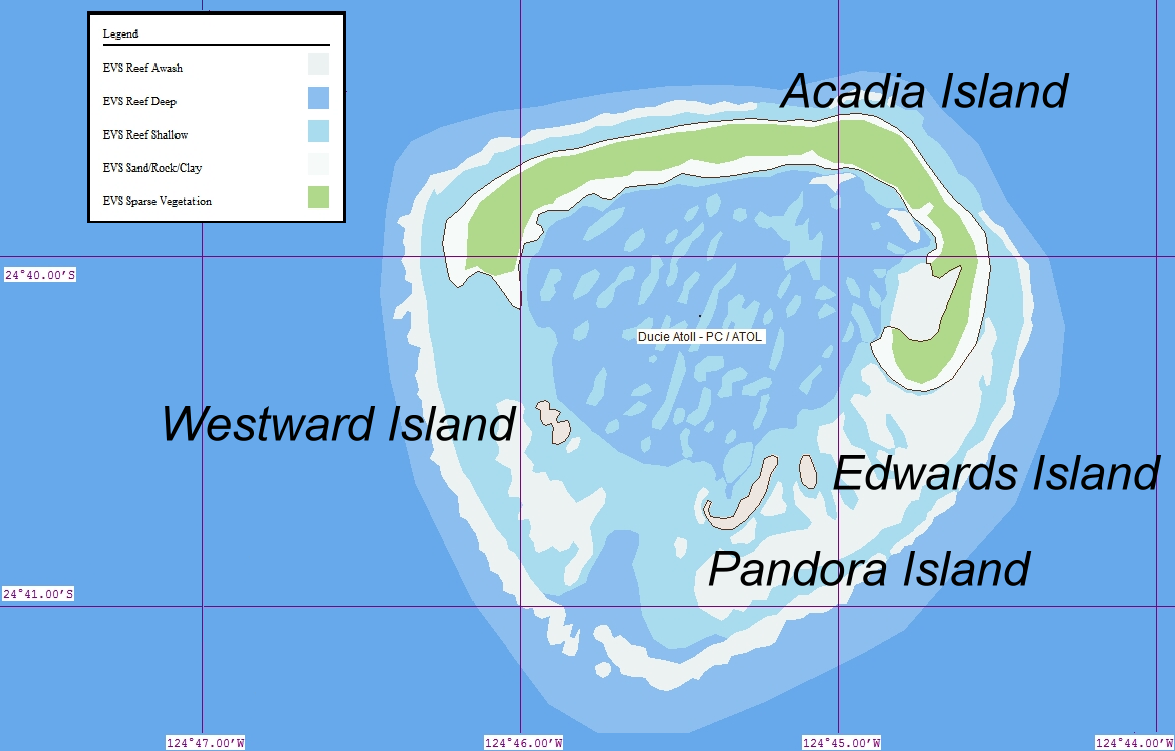
Islets of Ducie

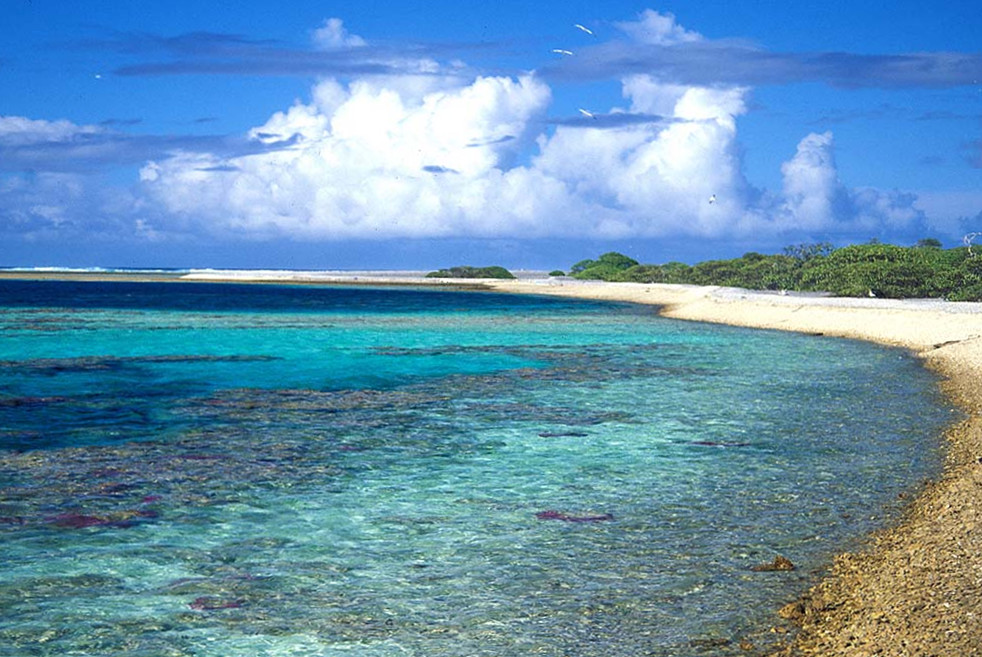
A beach on Acadia Islet

Ducie lies 290 miles (470 km) east of Pitcairn Island and is claimed by some to be the southernmost atoll in the world at 24°41' S latitude. However, Elizabeth Reef in the Tasman Sea is at 29°57 S latitude, so the assertion on behalf of Ducie Island is doubtful. Ducie Island's land area is 170 acres (69 ha) and its maximum elevation, occurring on the Westward islet, is 15 feet (4.6 m).

Ducie is located 620 miles (1,000 km) west of the edge of the Easter Plate. It was formed approximately 8 million years ago, after Oeno Island was formed by a hotspot that later caused a magma leak generated in the Oeno lineation. The leak spread over fracture zone FZ2, which was formed by the third movement of the Pacific Plate. The atoll is part of the Oeno-Henderson-Ducie-Crough seamount, speculated to be part of the southern Tuamotus.

The atoll consists of four islets: Acadia—which is by far the largest—Pandora, Westward and Edwards. All three of the smaller islets can be accessed on foot from Acadia at low tide. The islets were named by Harald Rehder and John Randall, who visited the atoll during an expedition by the Smithsonian Institution in 1975.

- Acadia Islet, along the atoll's north and east rim, is several times larger than the other three islets combined, measuring 140 acres (57 ha). Very long and thin, the islet is largely forested and is composed of ridges of coral rubble. It is named after the Acadia, a ship that was wrecked on Ducie in 1881.
- Pandora Islet, in the south, is the second largest. It is composed of sand and coral rubble that borders the lagoon. It is named after HMS Pandora.
- Edwards Islet lies immediately to the east of Pandora Islet and has the same characteristics. It is named after Edward Edwards, captain of HMS Pandora.
- Westward Islet, west of Pandora Islet, is the smallest. It appears sandy from a distance, but the soil is composed of coral rubble and dead shells. Its highest point rises 15 feet (4.6 m) above average sea level. It is named after the Westward, the ship that carried the members of the National Geographic Society and the Oceanic Institute during their 1970–71 expedition.

The atoll has a central lagoon, accessible by boat only by way of a channel 100 yards (91 m) wide located in the southwest, between Pandora and Westward Islets. It has a maximum depth of 52 feet (16 m) and its bottom consists of sand and coral. Whirlpools in the lagoon are common, caused by caves that drain the water from the lagoon into the ocean.

Pandora is known as being one of the three coastline vertices for Point Nemo, the set of coordinates in the South Pacific Ocean that represents the furthest point from any land in three directions.

== Flora ==
The vegetation in the atoll is sparse, because of the lack of fresh water. Only two species of vascular plant are currently known to grow there – one of the smallest such floras on any island. Acadia, Pandora and Edwards Islets are forested with Heliotropium foertherianum, but Westward Islet is not. Pemphis acidula has also been recorded on Ducie; specimens were found during an expedition in 1991.

During the expedition of Hugh Cuming in 1827 and the 1922 Whitney South Sea Expedition, Lepturus grass was found on Acadia Islet. However, it disappeared when storm waves deforested the island some time before the Smithsonian expedition of 1975. Thus H. foertherianum now dominates the vegetation of the islets. Additionally, there are a number of species of coralline algae, including Porolithon onkodes, Porolithon gardineri, and Caulerpa racemosa.

== Fauna ==
The atoll is populated by several species of birds, fish, and reptiles. In the lagoon, sparse, living coral can be found; the dominant species is Montipora bilaminata (family Acroporidae). Most of the coral in the lagoon is dead, presumed to have been killed by influxes of cold water.

=== Birds ===
Though no terrestrial birds are found on the atoll, Ducie Island is known for the seabirds that breed there. Birds that have been recorded nesting on the atoll include the red-billed tropicbird, red-tailed tropicbird, white tern, great frigatebird, masked booby, and red-footed booby. Wintering bristle-thighed curlews have been recorded as well. A number of tern species, including the sooty tern, blue noddy, brown noddy, lesser noddy, and white tern have been recorded, as have several members of the family Procellariidae: Kermadec petrel, Trindade petrel, Murphy's petrel, and Christmas shearwater.

The island is particularly important for Murphy's petrel, as more than 90% of its world population breeds on Ducie. Around 3,000 pairs of Christmas shearwaters, about 5% of the world's total population, can be found on the island too. Meanwhile, the red-tailed tropicbirds and white terns that breed on Ducie are around 1% of the world population of each species. Phoenix petrels, which previously inhabited the atoll, apparently disappeared between the Whitney expedition in 1922 and the 1991–92 Pitcairn Scientific Expedition. The island has been identified by BirdLife International as an Important Bird Area (IBA), principally for its colonies of Murphy's, herald, and Kermadec petrels, and Christmas shearwaters.

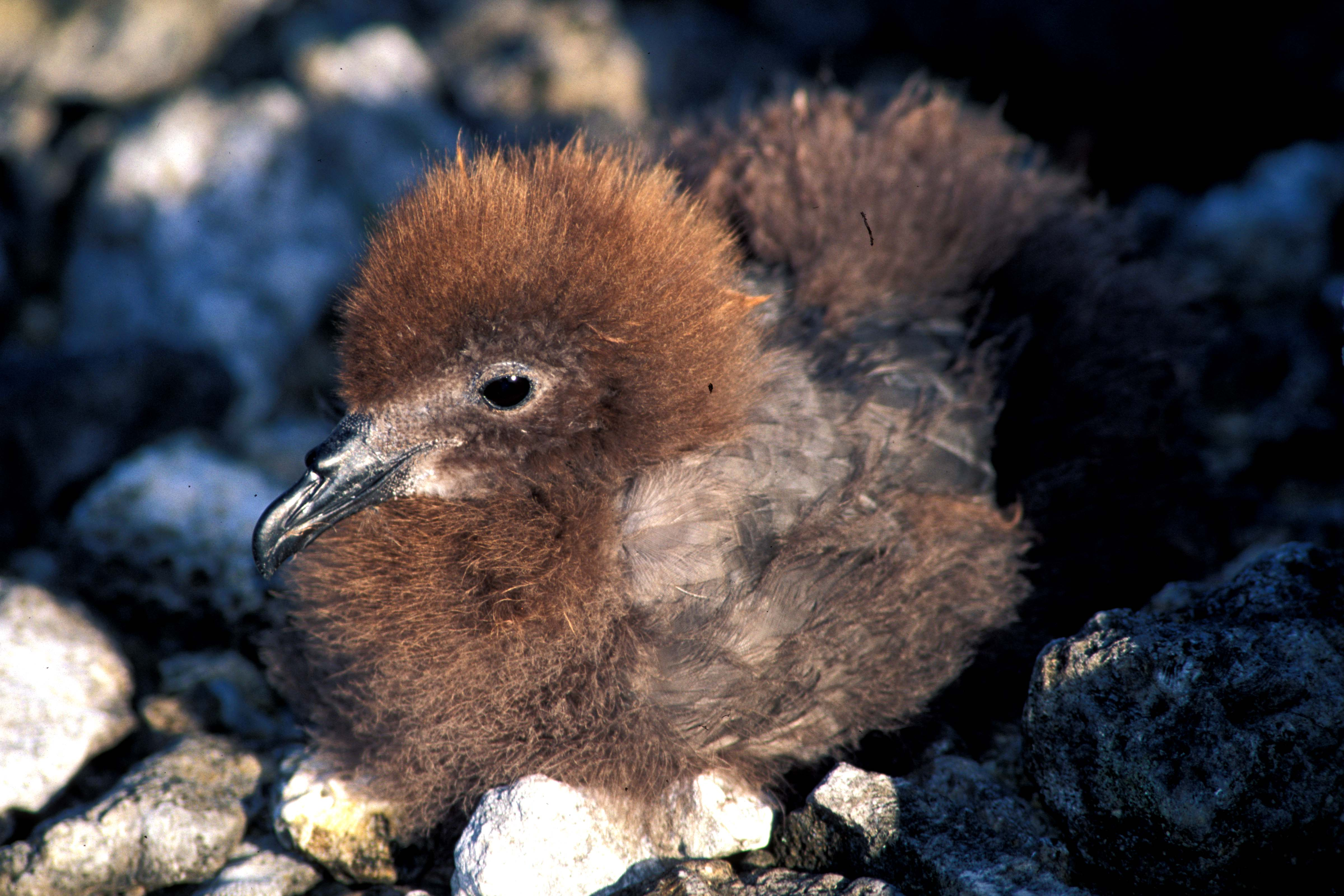
Murphy's petrel chick

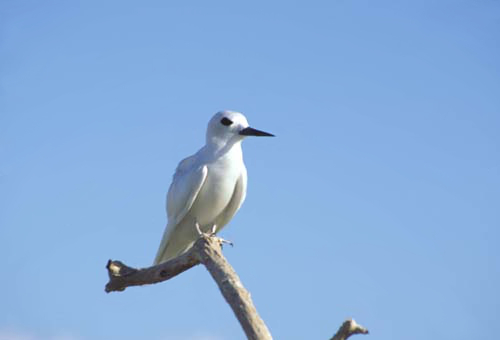
White tern

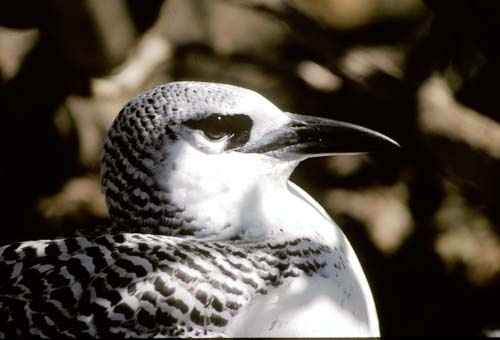
Red-tailed tropicbird

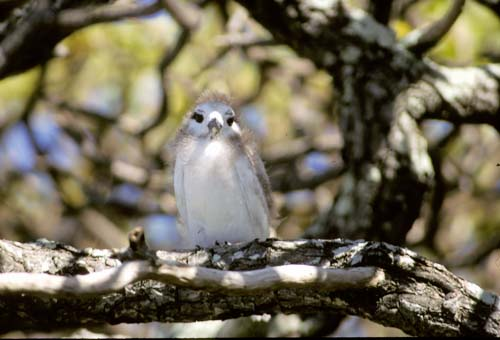
White tern chick

=== Fish ===
In the lagoon there are around 138 fish species, which also inhabit southeastern Oceania, the Western Pacific, and the Indian Ocean. The lagoon is noted for its poisonous fish and dangerous sharks. The yellow-edged lyretail, the blacktip grouper, and the greasy grouper are known to cause ciguatera poisoning. The lagoon is also inhabited by Galápagos sharks and the whitetip reef shark. The Galápagos shark is dangerous to humans, while the whitetips are seldom aggressive unless provoked. Five species are found exclusively around the Pitcairn Islands: Sargocentron megalops (a species of squirrelfish), the spiny butterflyfish, the Henderson triplefin (a species of threefin blenny), an unnamed species of Alticus (a genus of combtooth blenny), and an unnamed species of Ammodytes (a genus of sand lance).

=== Terrestrial vertebrates ===
Lizards that inhabit the island include the white-bellied skink (Emoia cyanura), photographed by E. H. Quayle during an expedition in 1922, and a lizard reported in the journal of an expedition in 1935 by James Chapin. The species of the latter was uncertain, but it was thought to be a gecko, possibly either an oceanic gecko (Gehyra oceanica), or a mourning gecko (Lepidodactylus lugubris). The 1991–92 Pitcairn Islands Scientific Expedition found specimens of both the mourning gecko and the white-bellied skink. The only mammal known to inhabit Ducie is the Polynesian rat; In 1997, there was a successful project to eradicate these by Brian Bell (WMIL) and Graham Wragg (S/V Te Manu), to aid the conservation of bird species threatened by the rat population. Green sea turtles feed on Ducie, but have not been seen to breed there.

== See also ==
- List of Guano Island claims
- List of islands
- Desert island
