= Arthur M. Ratliff =

Versatile personality of twentieth Century

Arthur "Smiley" Ratliff
- Born: Arthur Ratliff; June 18, 1924
- Died: October 31, 2007 (aged 83)

Arthur M. "Smiley" Ratliff (June 18, 1924 – October 31, 2007) was an American teacher, author and businessman from Tazewell, Virginia, with interests in coal mining, banking, cattle and real estate. Ratliff was awarded 19 medals for his service in World War II and the Korean War, including two Purple Hearts, the World War II Victory Medal and the United Nations Service Medal, as well as a Bronze Star for capturing a North Korean machine gun nest in 1950. He also received an honorary doctorate from Emory and Henry College.

Ratliff lived in the Whitten Valley section of Tazewell County. In the early 1980s, he proposed creating a home for himself on the remote British Overseas Territory of Henderson Island in the South Pacific. The Pitcairn Island Council approved his plans but, after environmentalists lobbied to protect the natural ecology and environment of the island, the British Foreign and Commonwealth Office overrode the decision and vetoed the proposed development. Henderson Island was listed as a World Heritage Site in 1988.
