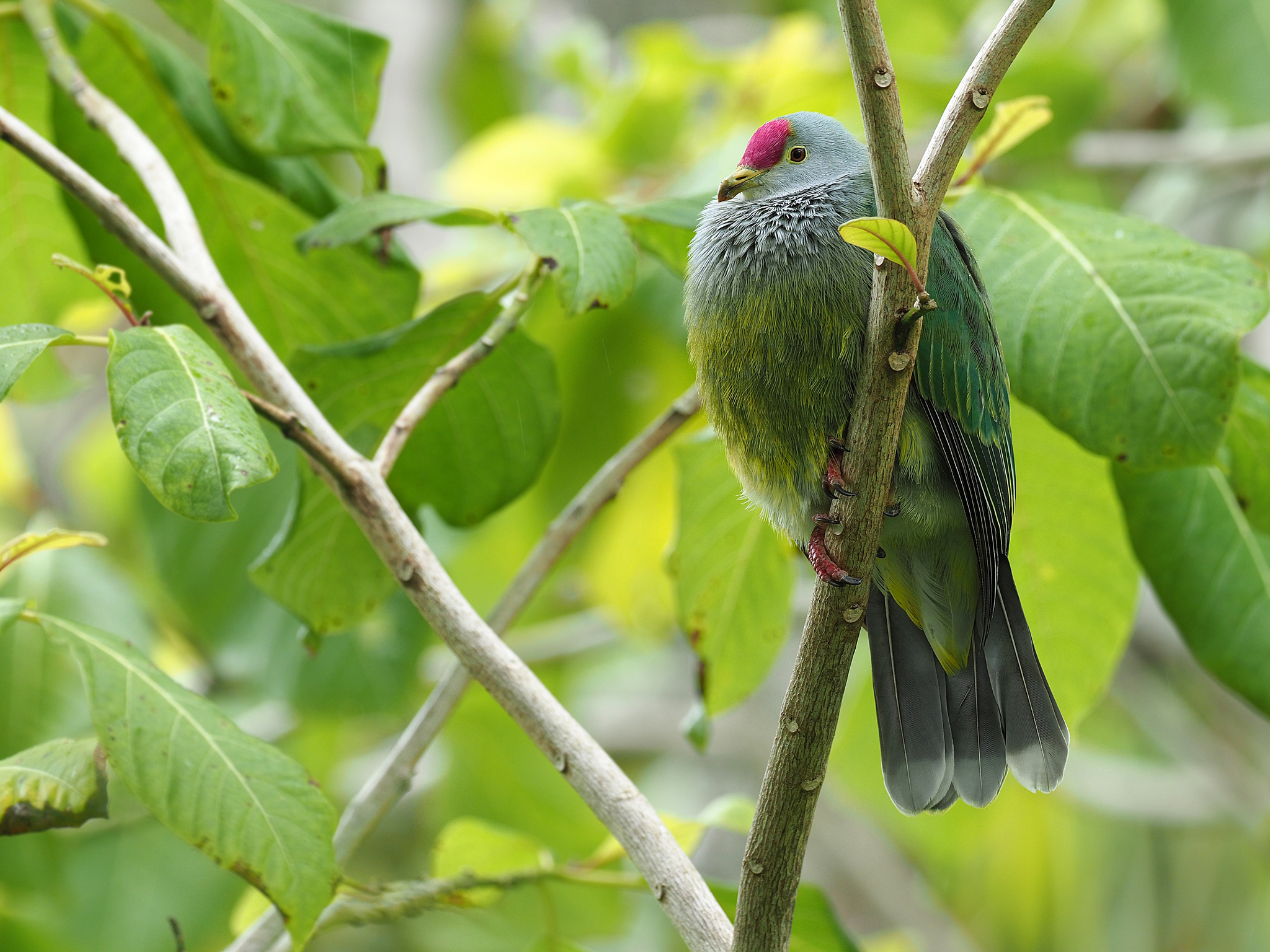

Conservation status
- Vulnerable (IUCN 3.1)

Scientific classification
- Kingdom: Animalia
- Phylum: Chordata
- Class: Aves
- Order: Columbiformes
- Family: Columbidae
- Genus: Ptilinopus
- Species: P. insularis

Binomial name
- Ptilinopus insularis North, 1908

= Henderson fruit dove =

Species of bird

The Henderson fruit dove, Henderson Island fruit dove or scarlet-capped fruit dove (Ptilinopus insularis) is a species of bird in the family Columbidae.

== Appearance ==
The Henderson Fruit Dove ranges from 20–25 cm (7.9–9.8 in) in size. The forehead and crown are a crimson-purple color with a narrow border of yellow surrounding them. Its throat and back of the head are white. Its nape, neck, and chest are light gray, leading to a bright yellow stomach. Its back and wings are a darker green with yellow on the edge. The tip of the tail is a mix of gray and yellow. The feet are a bright pink color. The female appearance is a little different. While the majority of it is the same, its crown is a darker green color, and its wings and chest have yellow margins.

== Habitat ==
The Henderson Fruit Dove is endemic to Henderson Island in the South Pacific Pitcairn Island group.

Its natural habitat is tropical moist lowland scrub forest, which it formerly shared with three other endemic species of pigeon, now extinct.

== Population ==
The Henderson Fruit Dove population status is stable. There are 3,000–4,000 mature individuals on the South Pacific Pitcairn Island, a minimal increase from the 3,600 birds recorded in 1992. The life span is around 3.9 years. Since the Henderson Fruit Dove does not travel outside its native island, this dove's food sources limit the maximum population.

== Diet ==
The Henderson Fruit Dove is mainly frugivorous, meaning its diet consists of fruit pulp and, specifically, intact fruit from Nesoluma and Ixora. The fruits of Procris pedunculata, a plant known to grow from the West Indian Ocean to the Pacific, are especially important in the diet, but all available fruits are consumed. These fruits form most of their diet, but they also consume young shoots of the fern Phymatosorus scolopendria when the fruits are unavailable. A preference for fruit with a high water content suggests that the species relies on its food for water consumption, especially during dry spells. There are no permanent freshwater ponds or marshy habitats on Henderson Island, meaning that they do not have a constant water supply.

== Behavior ==
Since the Henderson Island Fruit Dove only lives on Henderson Island, it does not travel far. The bird is territorial and only responds to the playback of the bird call, which sounds like a long series of "woot" notes that are well-spaced and gradually decrease in pitch. The bird sounds are 10–15 notes on an even pitch that gradually accelerate and last between 6-7 seconds. When hearing this bird call, they only travel 100–200 m (330–660 ft) over the forest. Since this bird species only lives on one island, it is easy for them to breed. They breed during the months of March and April.
