= Enneapterygius randalli =

Conservation status
- Least Concern (IUCN 3.1)

Scientific classification
- Kingdom: Animalia
- Phylum: Chordata
- Class: Actinopterygii
- Order: Blenniiformes
- Family: Tripterygiidae
- Genus: Enneapterygius
- Species: E. randalli

Binomial name
- Enneapterygius randalli Fricke, 1997

Species of fish

Enneapterygius randalli, the Rapa triplefin, is a species of triplefin blenny in the genus Enneapterygius. It was described by Ronald Fricke in 1997. who honoured the American ichthyologist John Ernest Randall in its specific name, Randall collected many of the type series. This species is known only from French Polynesia where it is found off Rapa Iti and Marotiri in the southern Austral Islands.
