= Henderson ground dove =

Henderson ground dove Temporal range: ?Late Pleistocene-Holocene

Scientific classification
- Kingdom: Animalia
- Phylum: Chordata
- Class: Aves
- Order: Columbiformes
- Family: Columbidae
- Genus: Pampusana
- Species: P. leonpascoi

Binomial name
- Pampusana leonpascoi (Worthy & Wragg, 2003)

Synonyms
- Gallicolumba leonpascoi Worthy & Wragg, 2003; Alopecoenas leonpascoi

Extinct species of bird

The Henderson ground dove (Pampusana leonpascoi), or Henderson Island ground dove, is an extinct species of bird in the family Columbidae. It was described from Holocene to possibly Late Pleistocene-aged subfossil remains found on Henderson Island in the Pitcairn Group in 1991. Its relatively small wings suggest it was flightless.
