= Enneapterygius howensis =

Conservation status
- Least Concern (IUCN 3.1)

Scientific classification
- Kingdom: Animalia
- Phylum: Chordata
- Class: Actinopterygii
- Order: Blenniiformes
- Family: Tripterygiidae
- Genus: Enneapterygius
- Species: E. howensis

Binomial name
- Enneapterygius howensis Fricke, 1997

Species of fish

Enneapterygius howensis, the Lord Howe Island triplefin, is a species of threefin blenny in the genus Enneapterygius, described by German ichthyologist Ronald Fricke in 1997. It is endemic to Lord Howe Island.
