= Enneapterygius ornatus =

Conservation status
- Least Concern (IUCN 3.1)

Scientific classification
- Kingdom: Animalia
- Phylum: Chordata
- Class: Actinopterygii
- Order: Blenniiformes
- Family: Tripterygiidae
- Genus: Enneapterygius
- Species: E. ornatus

Binomial name
- Enneapterygius ornatus Fricke, 1997

Species of fish

Enneapterygius ornatus, known commonly as the Henderson triplefin, is a species of triplefin blenny in the genus Enneapterygius. It was described by Ronald Fricke in 1997. It occurs only at Henderson Island, part of the Pitcairn Islands in the western Pacific Ocean.
