= Oeno (ship) =

The Oeno was a nineteenth-century Pacific whaler. It traveled around Fiji and the Pitcairn Islands.

== Design ==
The boat was a whaler and weighed 328 tons. The boat was designed in Nantucket. The designer Aaron Mitchell of Nantucket, had Elijah and John B. Barstow of Barstow's Lower Shipyard in Hanover, build the Oeno on the North River, in the year 1821. The Oeno is a part of the old maritime history of Hanover, and its surrounding North River towns

== History ==
In November 1824, the crew on the boat began whaling in the South Pacific Ocean (According to William Cary, who was on the boat at the time). By March 17, 1825, the crew had captured eight whales and used 150 barrels.

=== Pitcairn Islands ===
On January 26, 1824, George Worth, while sailing in the boat, discovered an island in the Pitcairn Islands. He named it Oeno Island after the boat.

=== Wreck ===
At approximately 2:AM on April 14, 1825, the boat crashed into a reef at Vatoa in Fiji. Only one person survived the crash, William Cary. The rest of the crew and the boat was massacred and killed by the Fijians in 1827. Shortly after returning to the United States, Cary claimed the ship was destroyed by the Natives at Vatoa.
