= 1981 Pitcairnese airfield referendum =

Referendum in the Pitcairn Islands

A referendum on building an airfield was held in the Pitcairn Islands in March 1981. With the island only accessible by boat, around 90% voted in favour of constructing an airfield. The Island Council supported the construction of an airfield. However, construction was too expensive for the British Authorities.

== Results ==
Choice	Votes	%
For	26	89.66
Against	3	10.34
Invalid/blank votes	4	–
Total	33	100
Registered voters/turnout	36	91.67
Source: Direct Democracy
