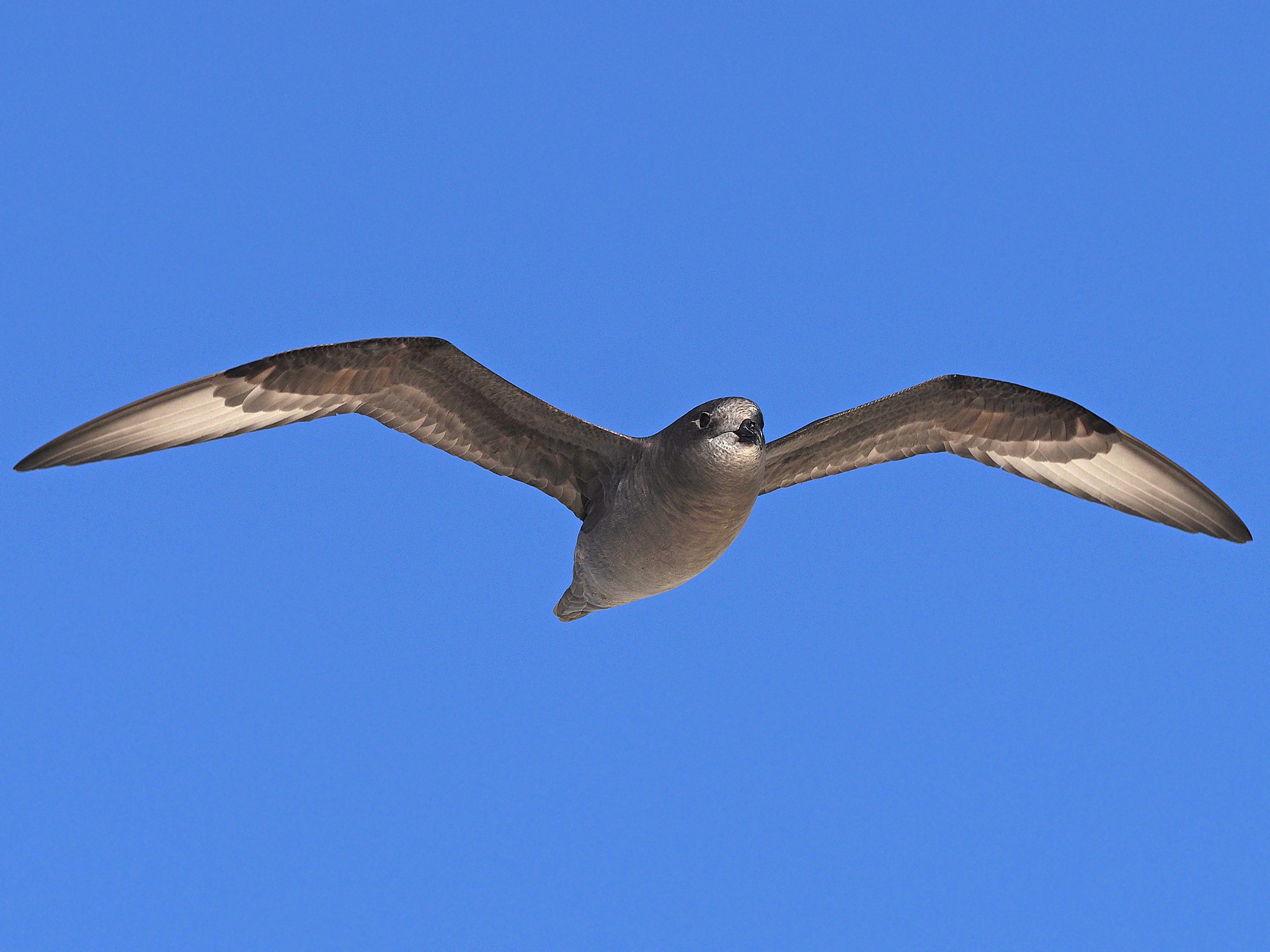
- Murphy's Petrel (Pterodroma ultima) in Pitcairn Islands

Conservation status
- Least Concern (IUCN 3.1)

Scientific classification
- Kingdom: Animalia
- Phylum: Chordata
- Class: Aves
- Order: Procellariiformes
- Family: Procellariidae
- Genus: Pterodroma
- Species: P. ultima

Binomial name
- Pterodroma ultima Murphy, 1949

= Murphy's petrel =

Species of bird

Murphy's petrel (Pterodroma ultima) is a species of seabird and a member of the gadfly petrels. The bird is 38–41 cm length, with a 97 cm wingspan, and weighs about 360 g. Its plumage is all dark sooty-grey, except for a pale chin, and pinkish legs; it does not exhibit sexual dimorphism. It was described by Robert Cushman Murphy in 1949, which is the source of the species' common name.

Murphy's petrels take unusually long feeding trips during incubation.

== Distribution ==
Very little is known about this species of petrel. It occurs in the South Pacific, nesting on rocky islets and cliffs off tropical oceanic islands in the Austral, Tuamotu, and Pitcairn groups. It was not until the 1980s that it was determined that these petrels might be regular visitors far offshore of the west coast of North America. It has been recorded off the coast of the Hawaiian Islands and well off the Pacific Coast of the United States and in the southern Gulf of Alaska. Most reports of Murphy's petrels are over 64 km offshore and the species reportedly has one of the greatest foraging ranges of any breeding seabird.

The species breeds in varying numbers across a number of islands in the Pacific, from the Pitcairn Islands west through the Tuamotus, Austral Islands, and Gambier Islands in French Polynesia as far as the Cook Islands. Breeding has also been documented as far east as Easter Island and the Juan Fernández Islands off the coast of Chile.

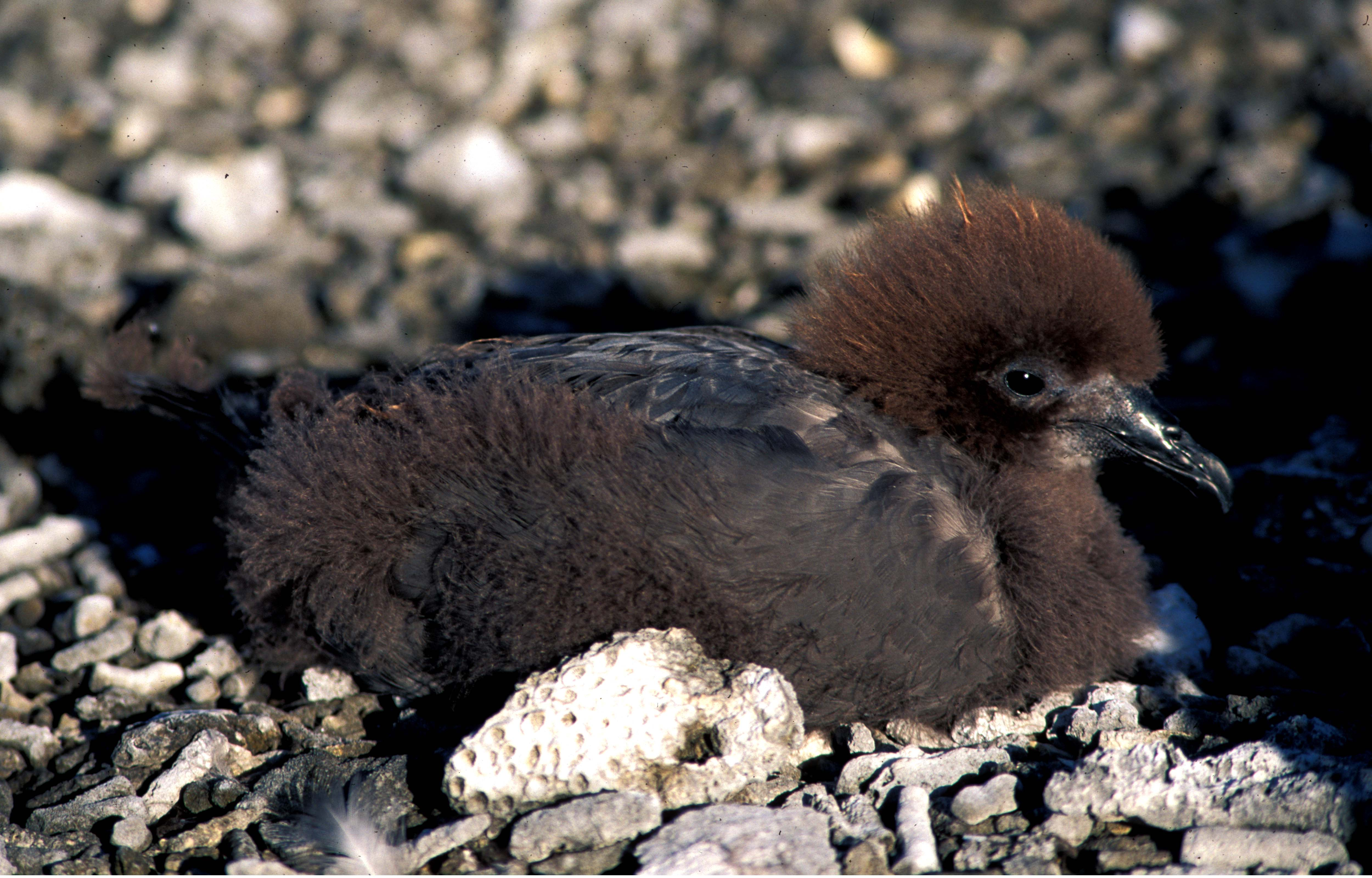
A chick nearing fledging on Oeno island

== Conservation ==
Murphy's petrel is not thought to be endangered and is listed as being of least concern on the IUCN Red List. A 2004 estimate pegged the total population of the species at 800,000–1,000,000 million individuals. The largest colonies are located on the Pitcairn Islands, especially on the rat-free islands of Ducie and Oeno, with the colony at Ducie estimated to number 250,000 breeding individuals. Colonies outside the Pitcairns are significantly smaller. Predation by rats represents a threat to the species and breeding success seems correlated with the with the presence of rats. Henderson Island, where rat eradication efforts were unsuccessful, nesting success is only 17%. However, rat predation is unlikely to be serious enough to impact the global population due to the rat-free status of the largest colonies. Sea level rise also represents a threat to this species due to its breeding on low-lying islands.
