= Henderson imperial pigeon =

Henderson imperial pigeon Temporal range: Holocene

Conservation status
- Extinct

Scientific classification
- Kingdom: Animalia
- Phylum: Chordata
- Class: Aves
- Order: Columbiformes
- Family: Columbidae
- Genus: Ducula
- Species: †D. harrisoni

Binomial name
- †Ducula harrisoni Wragg & Worthy, 2006

Extinct species of bird

The Henderson imperial pigeon (Ducula harrisoni), or Henderson Island imperial pigeon, is an extinct species of bird in the Columbidae, or pigeon family. It was described from subfossil remains found on Henderson Island in the Pitcairn Group of south-eastern Polynesia.

== Extinction ==
The pigeon became extinct following human colonisation of Henderson, an event that had occurred by 1050 CE. Two of the other three species of pigeon on the island also disappeared, as did other birds.
