= Henderson sandpiper =

Conservation status
- Extinct (ca. 1000 AD)

Scientific classification
- Kingdom: Animalia
- Phylum: Chordata
- Class: Aves
- Order: Charadriiformes
- Family: Scolopacidae
- Genus: Prosobonia
- Species: †P. sauli

Binomial name
- †Prosobonia sauli De Pietri et al., 2020

Small extinct Polynesian sandpiper shorebird

The Henderson sandpiper (Prosobonia sauli) is a small extinct Polynesian sandpiper shorebird from the Pitcairn Islands.

== Discovery and naming ==
It is based on subfossil remains found in 1991 and 1992 on Henderson Island, part of the Pitcairn Islands. Prosobonia sauli was named and described in 2020.

== Extinction ==
The Henderson sandpiper went extinct no earlier than the eleventh century (1000s), soon after humans arrived on Henderson Island. It is possible that these humans brought with them the Polynesian rat, which Polynesian sandpiper populations are very vulnerable to, causing the animal to go extinct.
