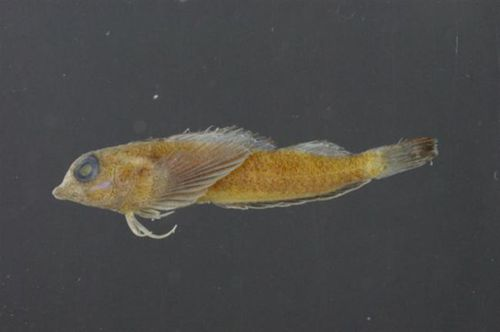

Conservation status
- Least Concern (IUCN 3.1)

Scientific classification
- Kingdom: Animalia
- Phylum: Chordata
- Class: Actinopterygii
- Order: Blenniiformes
- Family: Tripterygiidae
- Genus: Enneapterygius
- Species: E. kermadecensis

Binomial name
- Enneapterygius kermadecensis Fricke, 1994

= Enneapterygius kermadecensis =

Species of fish

Enneapterygius kermadecensis, the Kermadec triplefin, is a fish species in the family Tripterygiidae, found in tidal rock pools around the Kermadec Islands in the southwest Pacific Ocean. Its length is up to 3.3 cm.
