= Henderson Island (Pitcairn Islands) =

Largest of the Pitcairn Islands, British Overseas Territories

UNESCO World Heritage Site
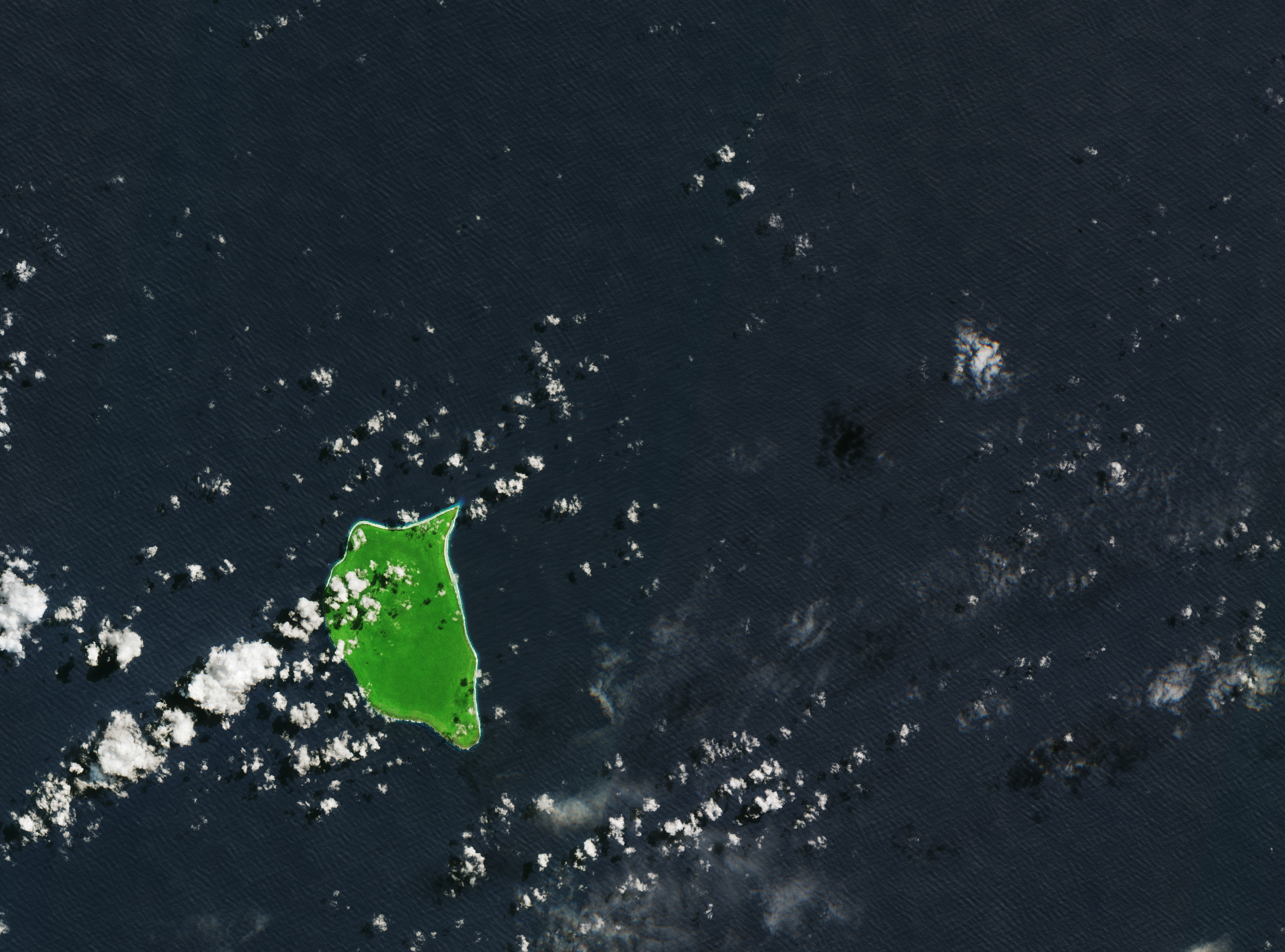
- Satellite image of Henderson Island

- Location within Pacific Ocean
- Location: Pacific Ocean
- Criteria: Natural: vii, x
- Reference: 487
- Inscription: 1988 (12th Session)
- Website: whc.unesco.org/en/list/487
- Coordinates: 24°22′30″S 128°19′30″W

Henderson Island is an uninhabited island in the south Pacific Ocean. It is part of the Pitcairn Island Group, together with Pitcairn, Oeno, and Ducie Islands. Measuring 9.6 by 5.1 kilometres (6.0 mi × 3.2 mi), it has an area of 37.3 km^{2} (14.4 sq mi) and is located 193 km (104 nmi; 120 mi) northeast of Pitcairn Island, which is the only inhabited island of the group. It has poor soil and little fresh water, and is unsuitable for agriculture. There are three beaches on the northern end and the remaining coast comprises steep (mostly undercut) cliffs up to 15 m (50 ft) in height. In 1902, it was annexed to the Pitcairn Islands colony, which is now a British Overseas Territory.

Henderson is one of the last two raised coral atolls in the world whose ecosystems remain relatively unaffected by human contact, along with Aldabra in the Indian Ocean. In 1988, it was designated a World Heritage Site by the United Nations. Ten of its 51 flowering plants, all four of its land birds and about a third of the identified insects and gastropods are endemic – a remarkable diversity given the island's size.

== History ==
The island was settled by Polynesians – possibly as early as 800 AD – but by the 1600s it had been abandoned. There is good evidence that the island was continuously occupied for a 600-year period sometime between those dates. The reasons for the inhabitants' disappearance remain uncertain, but they may relate to an exhaustion of resources and to the disappearance around the same time of the Polynesians on Pitcairn Island, on whom those on Henderson will have relied for many of the basics of life, especially for the stone needed to make tools. The Pitcairn Polynesians may in turn have disappeared because of the decline of nearby Mangareva; thus, Henderson was at the end of a chain of small, dependent colonies of Mangareva. The Polynesians that disappeared may have later migrated further to a bigger island to the east in Easter Island, for it has been noted that the jumping-off points for the early Polynesian colonization of Easter Island originally from Mangareva are more likely to have been from Pitcairn and Henderson, which lie about halfway between Mangareva and Easter. Great similarity between the Rapa Nui language and Early Mangarevan, similarities between a statue found in Pitcairn and some found in Easter Island, resemblance of tool styles in Easter Island to those in Mangareva and Pitcairn, and correspondences of skulls found in Easter Island to two found in Henderson all suggest that Henderson and Pitcairn were early Mangareva stepping-stones to Easter Island, which, in 1999, a voyage with reconstructed traditional Polynesian boats was able to reach from Mangareva after merely a seventeen-and-a-half-day voyage.

On 29 January 1606, Portuguese captain Pedro Fernandes de Queirós, leading a Spanish expedition in search of the fabled great south land (Terra Australis), was the first European to see the island, and named it San Juan Bautista. More than 200 years later, on 17 January 1819, Captain Henderson of the British East India Company ship Hercules rediscovered the island. Six weeks later, on 2 March 1819, Captain Henry King, of the Elizabeth, landed on the island to find the King's colours already flying. His crew scratched the name of their ship into a tree, and for a while the island was known as both Elizabeth and Henderson Island. Thomas Raine, master of the ship Surry of London, named it Henderson's Island because it appeared to him, from a conversation he had with James Henderson at Valparaíso, to have been Henderson's discovery.

On 20 November 1820, a sperm whale rammed and sank the Nantucket whaleship Essex (a report of which inspired Herman Melville to write Moby-Dick), and the ship's 20 crewmen arrived at Henderson on 20 December in three small whaleboats. They found the island's only known drinkable water source – a brackish spring on the north shore, exposed at half tide – and ate fish, birds, eggs, crabs and peppergrass, but within a week they had largely exhausted the readily available food. Therefore, on 27 December, the three boats set sail for South America, leaving behind Thomas Chappel, Seth Weeks and William Wright, who chose to stay and survived until their rescue several months later, on 9 April 1821.

In 1902, Henderson Island, along with Oeno and Ducie islands, was formally annexed to the British Empire by Captain G. F. Jones, who visited the islands in a cutter with a crew of Pitcairn Islanders. In August 1937, HMS Leander, on a journey from Europe to New Zealand, carried out an aerial survey of Henderson, Oeno and Ducie, and, on each island, a British flag was planted and an inscription was nailed up proclaiming: "This island belongs to H.B.M. King George VI".

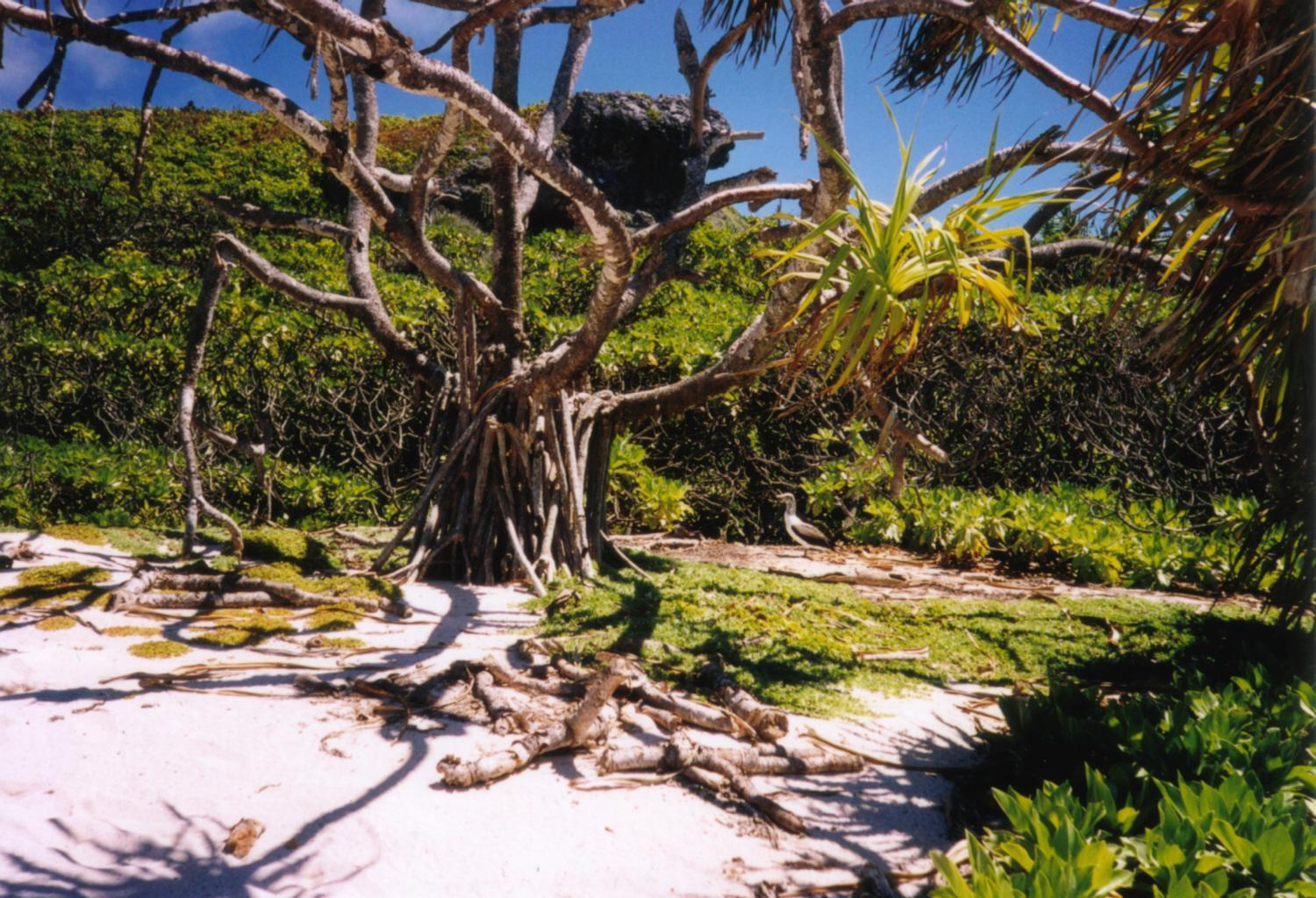
Henderson Island

In 1957, a 27-year-old American, Robert Tomarchin, lived the life of a castaway on the island for approximately two months, accompanied by a pet chimpanzee, apparently as a publicity stunt, until people from Pitcairn rescued him in two longboats.

In the early 1980s, the American businessman Arthur "Smiley" Ratliff expressed interest in establishing a mansion for himself on the island, with an airstrip. The Pitcairn Island Council approved his plans but, after environmentalists lobbied to protect the natural ecology and environment of the island, the British Foreign and Commonwealth Office overrode the decision and vetoed the proposed development. Henderson Island was listed as a World Heritage Site in 1988.

In 2019, a group of scientists, journalists, film makers, and artists took part in an expedition to Henderson Island to investigate plastic pollution and marine litter on the island. Five members of the expedition became stranded on the island when their inflatable craft capsized. In 2021, Pitcairn Islanders participated in a scientific expedition to assess the effects of climate change.

In March 2022, as part of an effort to update maritime charts regarding British Overseas Territories, a Royal Navy survey by HMS Spey found the island to be 1 nautical mile (1.9 km; 1.2 mi) south of its indicated position. That prior position was obtained from the 1937 aerial survey conducted by HMS Leander, indicating a calculation error occurred when the chart was produced.

== Natural resources ==
Since the introduction of aluminium-hulled long-boats in the 20th century, Pitcairners have made regular trips to Henderson to harvest the wood of miro and tou trees. Usually, they venture to Henderson once per year, but they may make up to three trips if the weather is favourable. Pitcairners carve the wood into curios for tourists, from which they derive much of their income.

== Geography ==
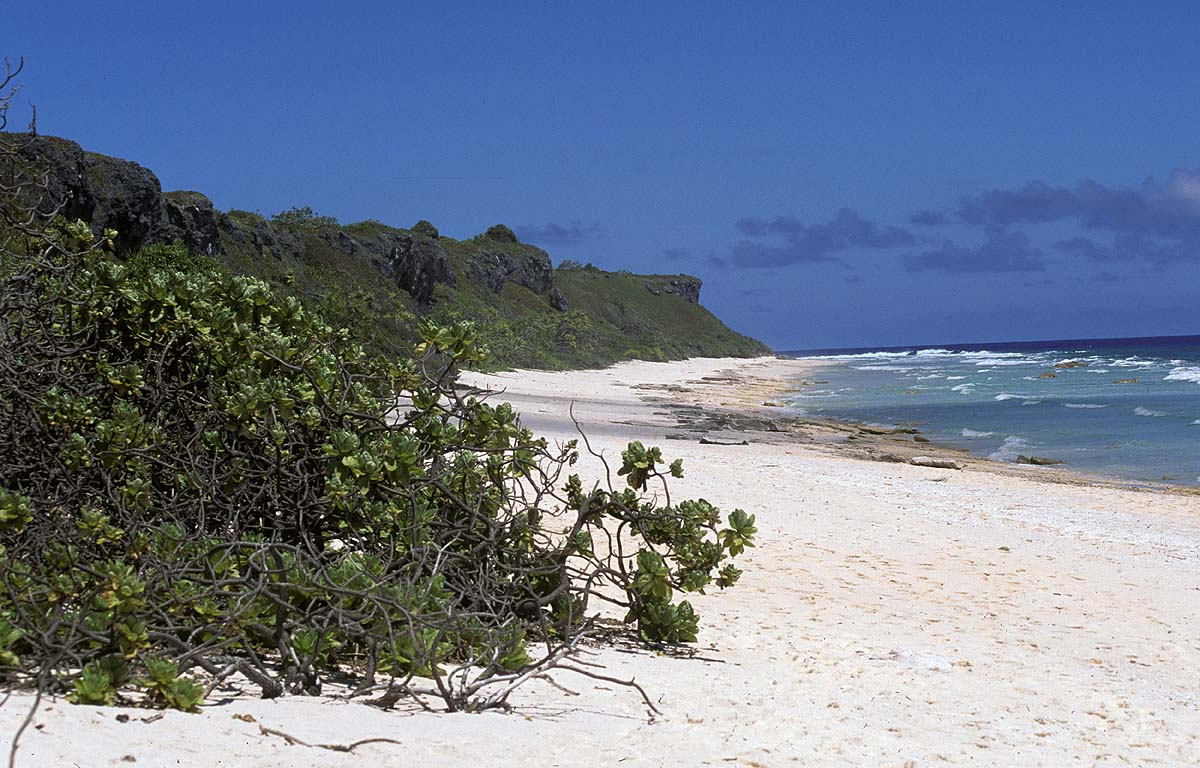
A view along the northern beach

Henderson Island is a raised coral atoll that, with Pitcairn, Ducie and Oeno islands, forms the Pitcairn Island Group. The nearest major landmass is the continent of South America, more than 5,000 km (2,700 nmi; 3,100 mi) away to the east. This coral limestone island sits atop a conical (presumed volcanic) mound, rising from a depth of roughly 3,500 m (11,500 ft). Its surface is mostly reef-rubble and dissected limestone – an extremely rugged mixture of steep, jagged pinnacles and shallow sinkholes. The island is mostly encircled by steep limestone cliffs up to 15 m (50 ft) high.

There are three main beaches, on the northwest, north, and northeast shores, and the north and northwest beaches are fringed by reefs. The depression at the island's centre is thought to be a raised lagoon. There is only one known potable water source, a brackish spring on the north shore exposed at half tide, rising from a crevice in flat rock, large surfaces of which compose the face of the beach. The surrounding ocean tidal range is about 1 metre (3 ft 3 in) at spring tide.

== Flora ==
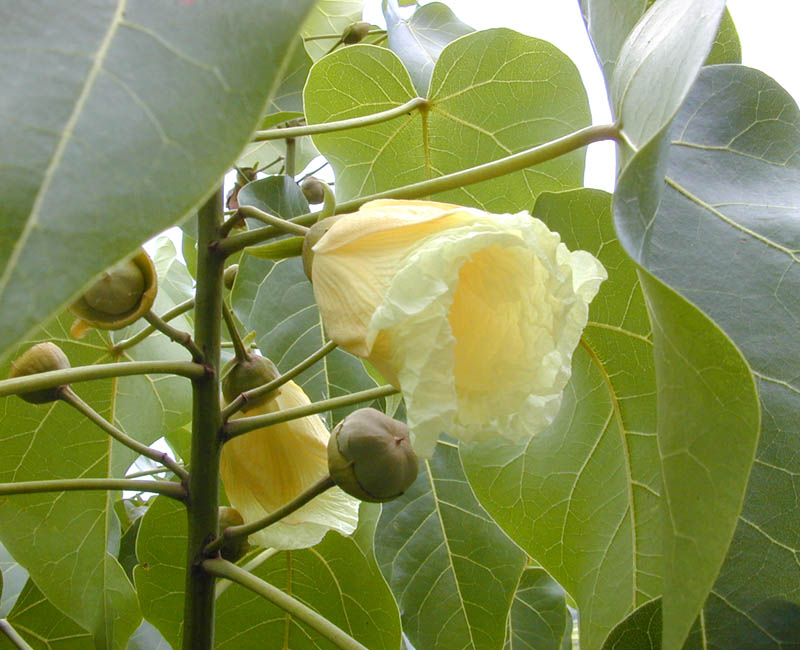
Thespesia populnea

Apart from five species bordering the beaches, including coconut palms, the vegetation is undisturbed. Henderson Island is covered by 5-to-10-metre (16 to 33 ft) tall tangled scrub forest, more thinly covered in the central depression. It has 51 native species of flowering plants, ten of which are endemic to the island. Dominant tree species include coconut palms, Pandanus tectorius, Thespesia populnea (miro), Heliotropium foertherianum, Cordia subcordata (tou), Guettarda speciosa, Pisonia grandis, Geniostoma hendersonense, Nesoluma st-johnianum, Hernandia stokesii, Myrsine hosakae, and Celtis sp.

== Fauna ==
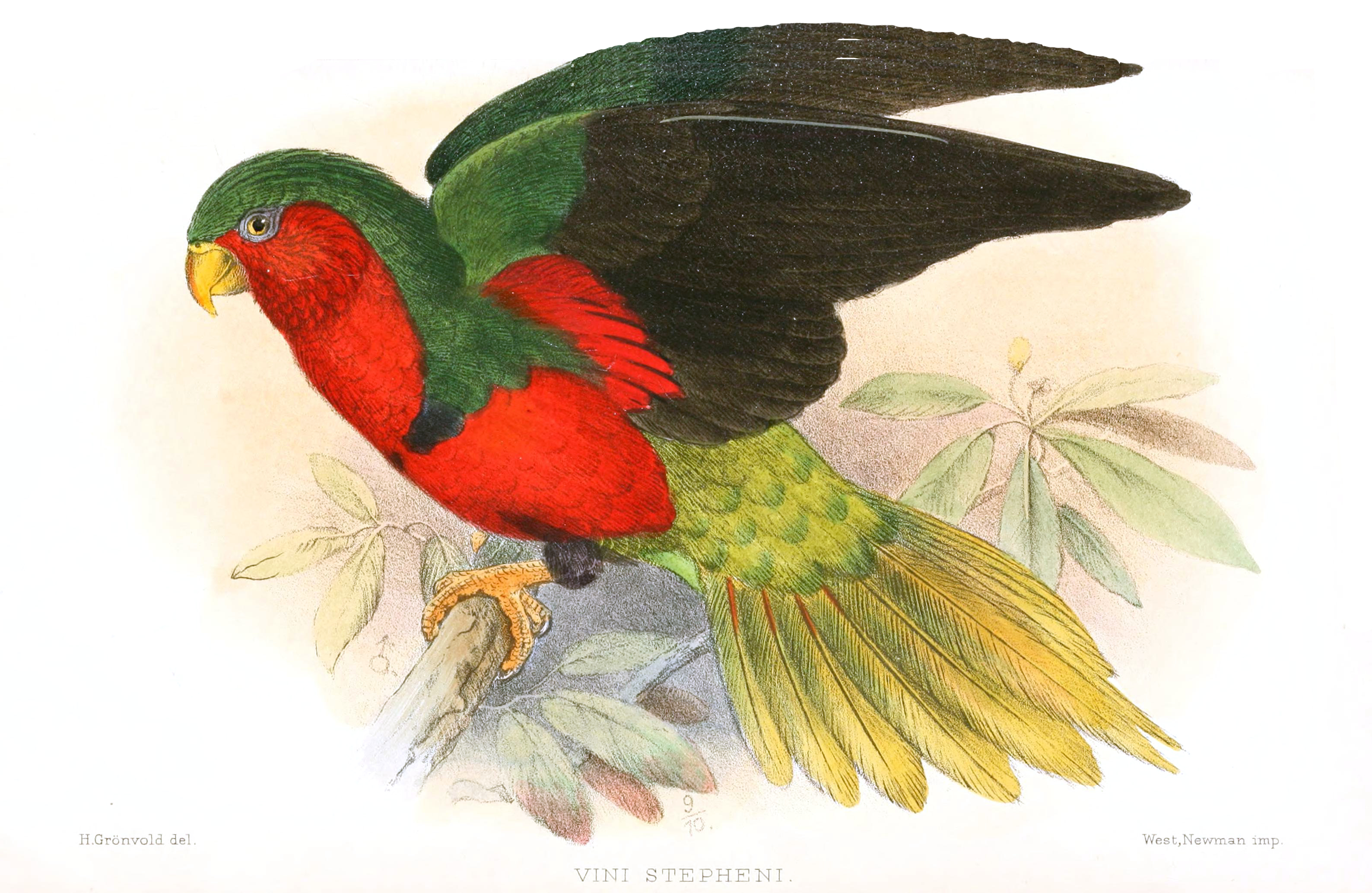
The Henderson lorikeet (Vini stepheni), also known as the Stephen's lorikeet, is a species of parrot in the family Psittacidae, endemic to Henderson Island.

=== Birds ===
The island has been identified by BirdLife International as an Important Bird Area for its endemic landbirds and breeding seabirds. The island is home to four extant endemic land bird species – the Henderson fruit dove, Henderson lorikeet, Henderson reed warbler and the flightless Henderson crake. Of the fifteen non-endemic seabird species found, nine or more are believed to breed on the island. Breeding colonies of the globally endangered Henderson petrel formerly existed on Ducie but were wiped out by invasive rats by 1922. It is believed to now nest uniquely on Henderson Island.

Three species of the family Columbidae – the Henderson ground dove, the Henderson imperial pigeon and the Henderson archaic pigeon – as well as the Henderson sandpiper, were formerly endemic to the island, but became extinct around 1000 AD after the arrival of Polynesians. Remains of an undescribed subspecies of the still-extant Pacific Swallow have also been found. Bones associated with prehistoric Polynesian settlement sites dating to somewhere between 500 and 800 years ago include those of the Polynesian storm petrel, and of Christmas shearwater and red-footed booby that still visit but no longer nest. It is hypothesized that the Polynesian settlers may have driven these bird species, along with six terrestrial snail species, to local extinction, and this loss of a ready and regular food supply may have contributed to the Polynesians' subsequent disappearance.

=== Other animals ===
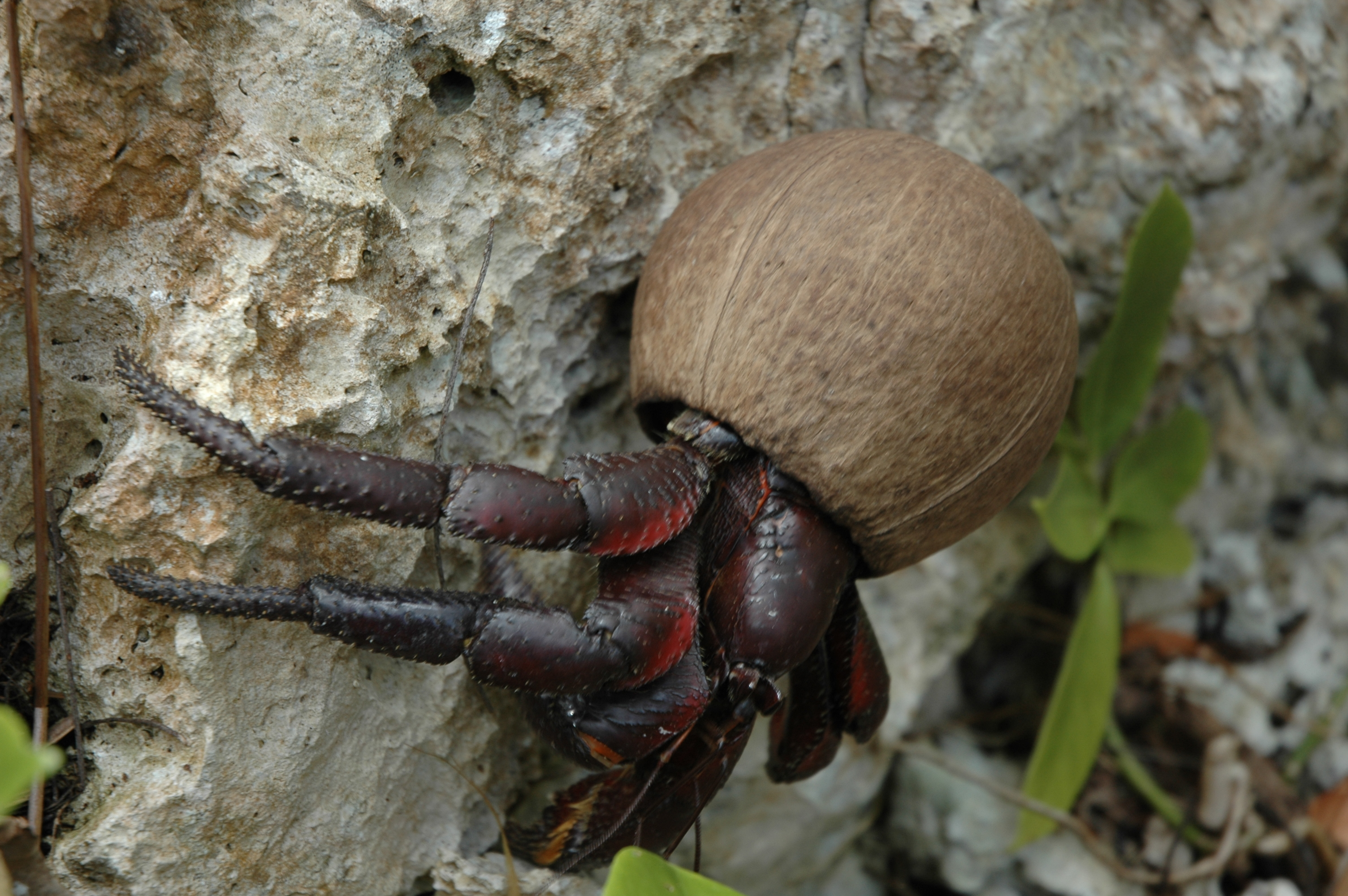
Hermit crab

The invertebrate species are largely unknown but a third of the island's known non-marine gastropods and insects are endemic. There are also crabs, including coconut crabs. There are no native mammals but the Pacific rat, introduced by Polynesians 800 years ago, abounds. One species of gecko (Lepidodactylus lugubris) and three species of skink (Cryptoblepharus poecilopleurus, Emoia cyanura, Ornithuroscincus noctua) have been recorded, and are also suggested to have been introduced by Polynesians. There are also reports of a second unidentified gecko which may be endemic, and green sea turtles nest on the beaches.

=== Biological risk ===
Land bird populations appear to be relatively stable but there is a high risk of introduction to the island of predators, disease vectors, and diseases by unauthorized landings of yachts. Introduction of the Eurasian black rat or the domestic cat would be likely to cause almost immediate extinction of the ground-dwelling Henderson crake and possibly other species. The endemic birds may have no immunity to the fatal avian pox which is transmitted by biting flies, such as Hippoboscidae.

Between July and November 2011, a partnership of the Pitcairn Islands Government and the Royal Society for the Protection of Birds implemented a poison baiting programme aimed at eradicating the Pacific rat. Mortality was massive but of the 50,000 to 100,000 population, 60 to 80 individuals survived, and the population has now fully recovered.

== Plastic debris ==
Research published in April 2017 looked at debris on several beaches, and reported "the highest density of plastic rubbish anywhere in the world" as a result of the South Pacific Gyre. The beaches contain an estimated 37.7 million items of debris together weighing 17.6 tonnes (17.3 long tons; 19.4 short tons). In a study transect on North Beach, each day 17 to 268 new items washed up on a 10-metre (33 ft) section. The study noted that purple hermit crabs (Coenobita spinosus) make their homes in plastic containers washed up on beaches, and the debris may reduce shoreline gastropod diversity, may contribute to a reduction in the number of sea turtle laying attempts and may increase the risk of entanglement for coastal-nesting seabirds.

In June 2019, an expedition organised by the UK Government attempted to remove some of the plastic debris from the island's East beach. The team collected six tonnes of rubbish, but weather conditions hampered efforts to take the rubbish off the island. Plastic gathered during this expedition was taken for recycling, being manufactured into new objects for use on Pitcairn Island and other island communities in the region. A followup expedition in July 2022 collected further plastic.

== Gallery ==
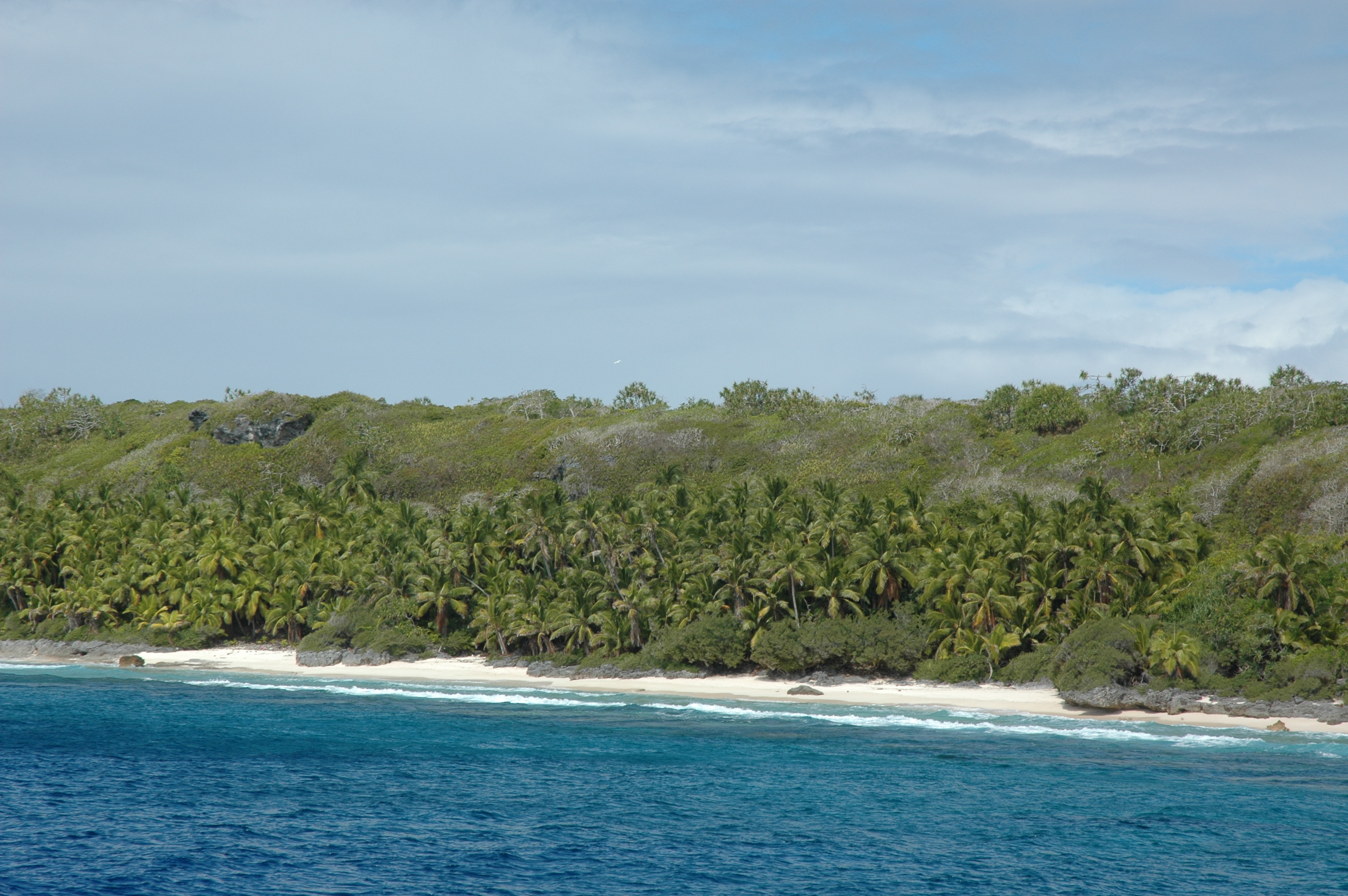
East beach

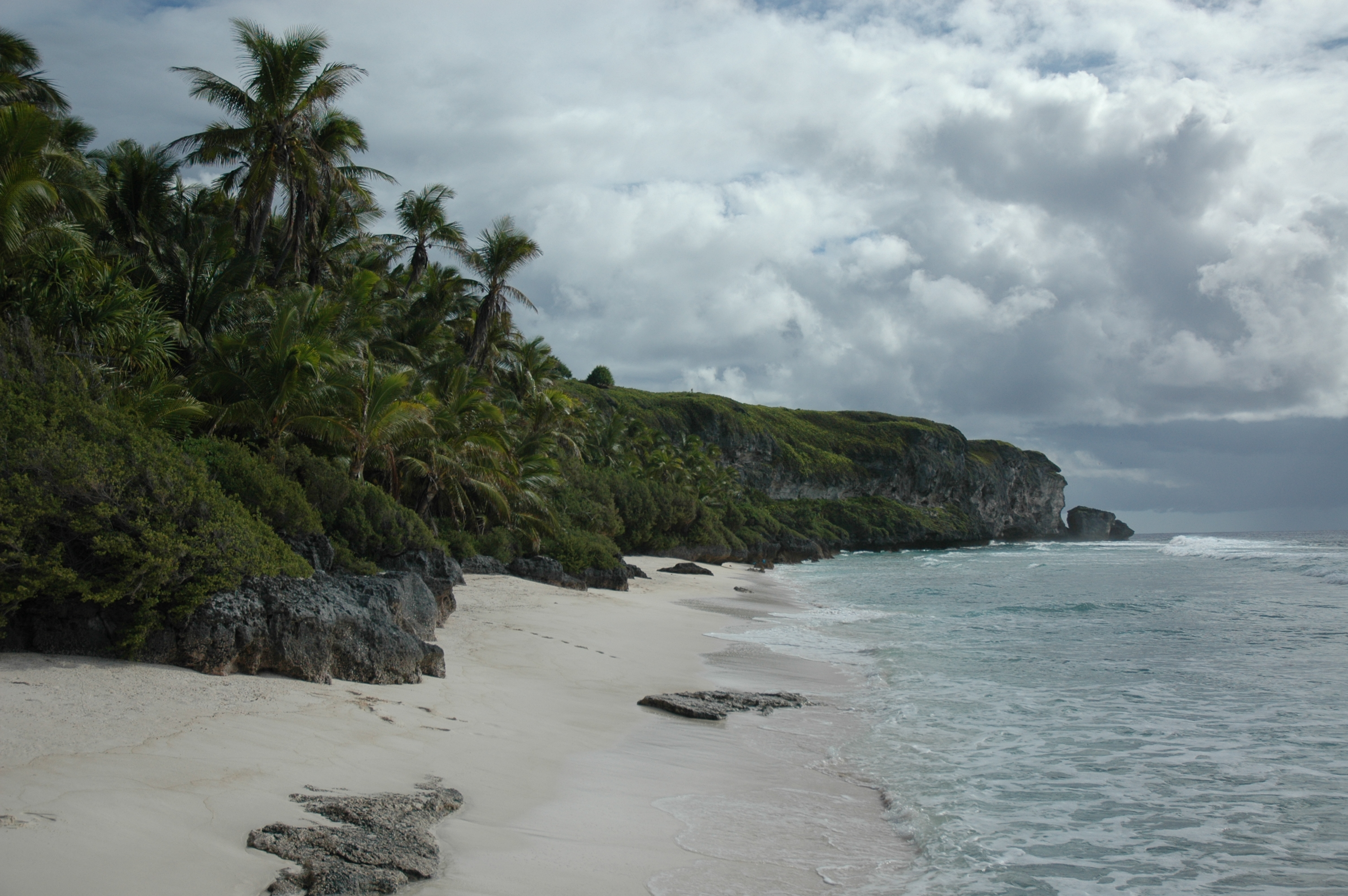
Northwest beach

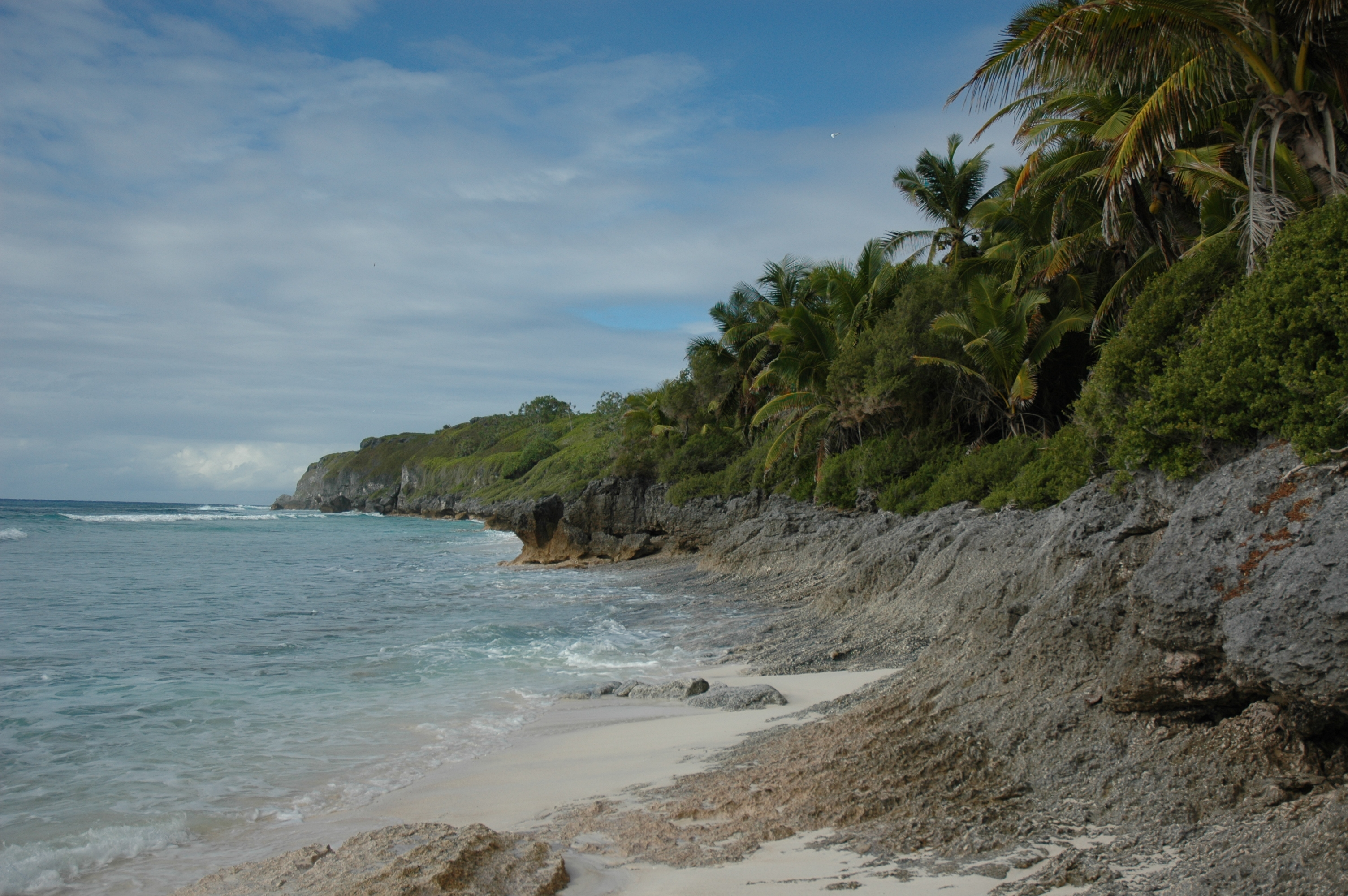
Northwest beach

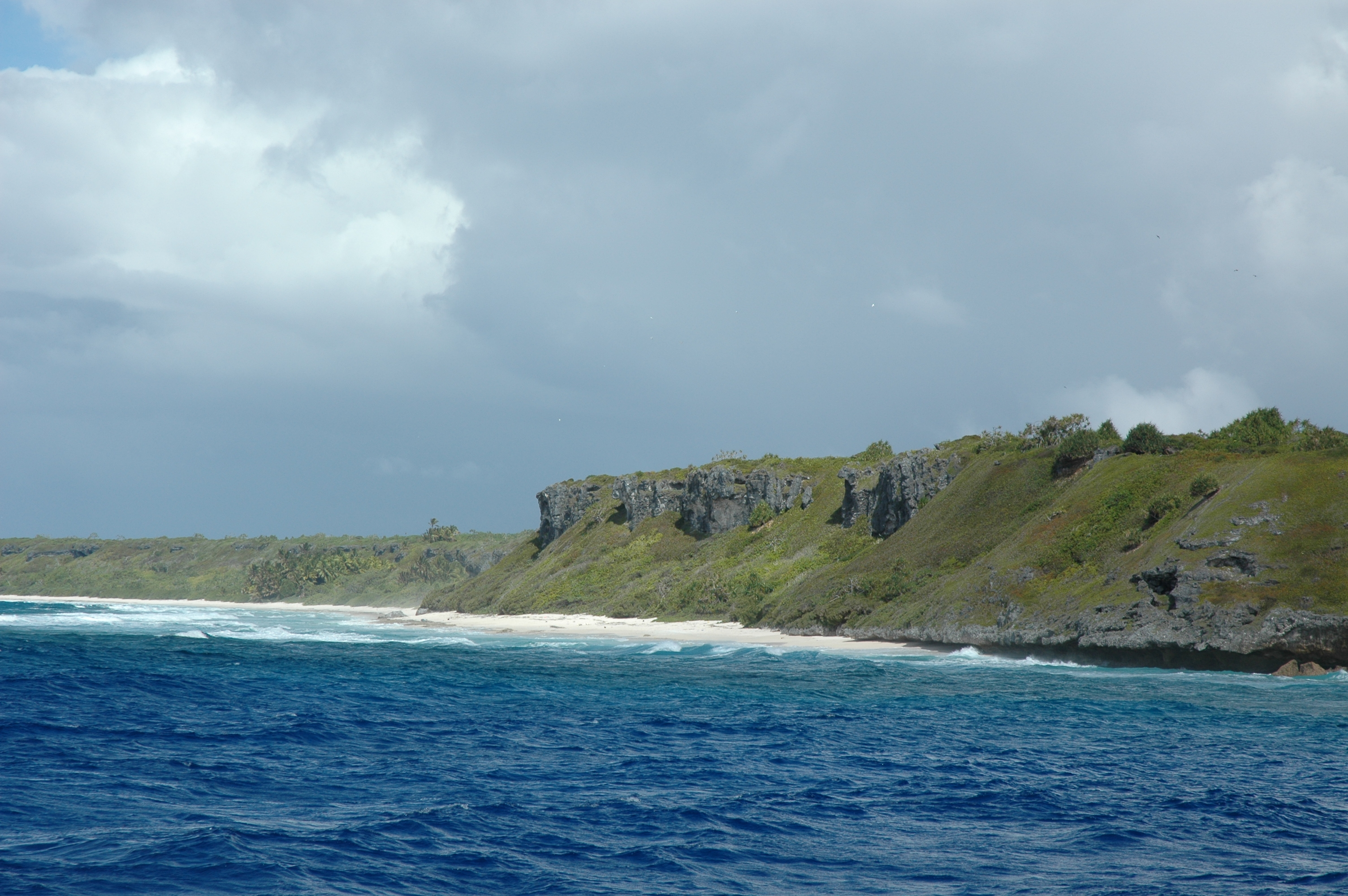
North beach

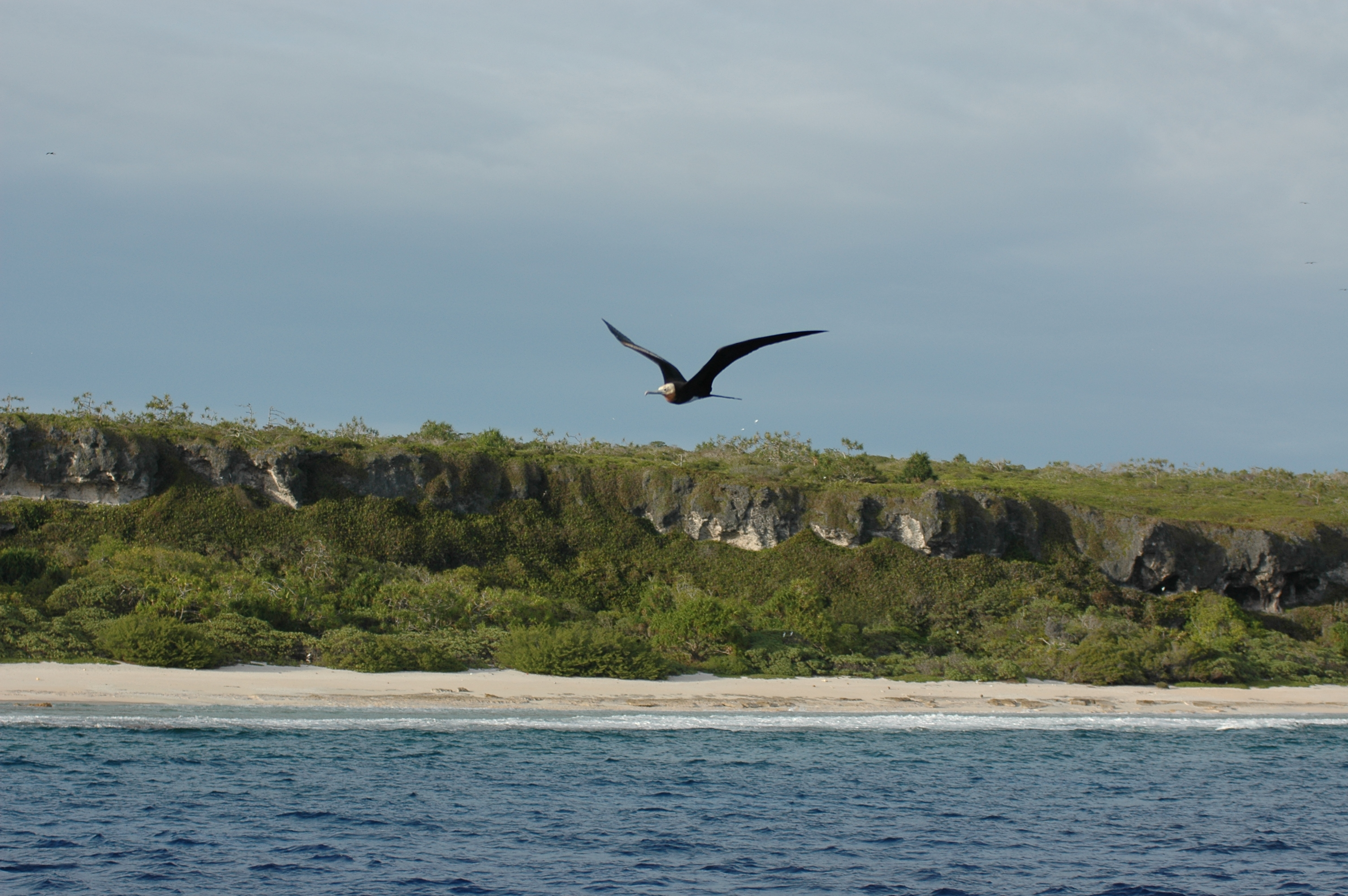
North beach
