= Oeno Island =

Atoll in the Pitcairn Islands, British Overseas Territories

Oeno
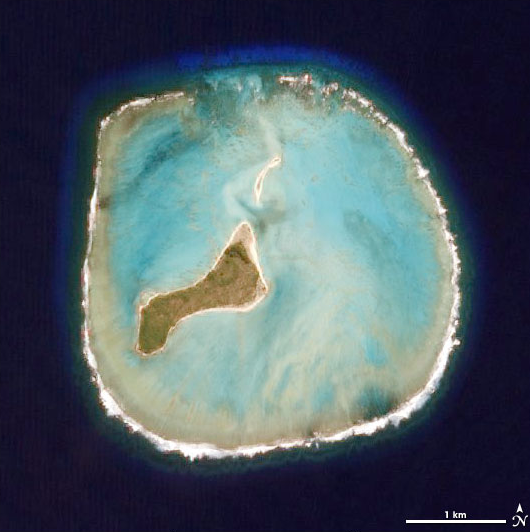
- Satellite photo of Oeno Island
- Interactive map of Oeno

Geography
- Location: Southern Pacific Ocean
- Coordinates: 23°55′36″S 130°44′14″W
- Total islands: 2–3
- Area: 20 km^{2} (7.7 sq mi)

Administration
- Pitcairn Islands

Demographics
- Population: 0 (2020)

Oeno Island (/oʊˈiːnoʊ/ oh-EE-noh) or Holiday Island is an uninhabited coral atoll in the South Pacific Ocean, part of the Pitcairn Islands overseas territory. It is part of the Pitcairn Island Group, together with Pitcairn, Henderson and Ducie islands.

== Geography ==
Oeno Island is located 143 kilometres (89 mi) northwest of Pitcairn Island, at 23°55′26″S 130°44′03″W. Oeno Atoll measures about 5 kilometres (3.1 mi) in diameter, including the central lagoon, with a total area exceeding 20 square kilometres (7.7 sq mi). There are two larger and three smaller islets on or within the rim of the atoll. Their aggregate land area is only 0.69 square kilometres (170 acres). Oeno serves as a private holiday site for the few residents of Pitcairn Island, who travel there and stay for two weeks in January because Oeno has beaches while Pitcairn does not.

The main island (Oeno Island), about 50 hectares (120 acres) in area, has forest and scrub with pandanus and palm trees. It is located in the southwest part of the atoll's lagoon. There is a water tap installed on the island. The maximum elevation is less than 5 metres (16 ft). Sandy Island (or Islands) is to the northeast, within the lagoon, and may be an ephemeral island. Three smaller islets are to the south and west of the main island.

=== Important Bird Area ===
The island has been identified by BirdLife International as an Important Bird Area (IBA) principally for its colony of Murphy's petrels, which, at some 12,500 pairs, is estimated to be the second largest colony of these birds in the world.

=== Maps ===
Location of Oeno Island in the Pacific Ocean
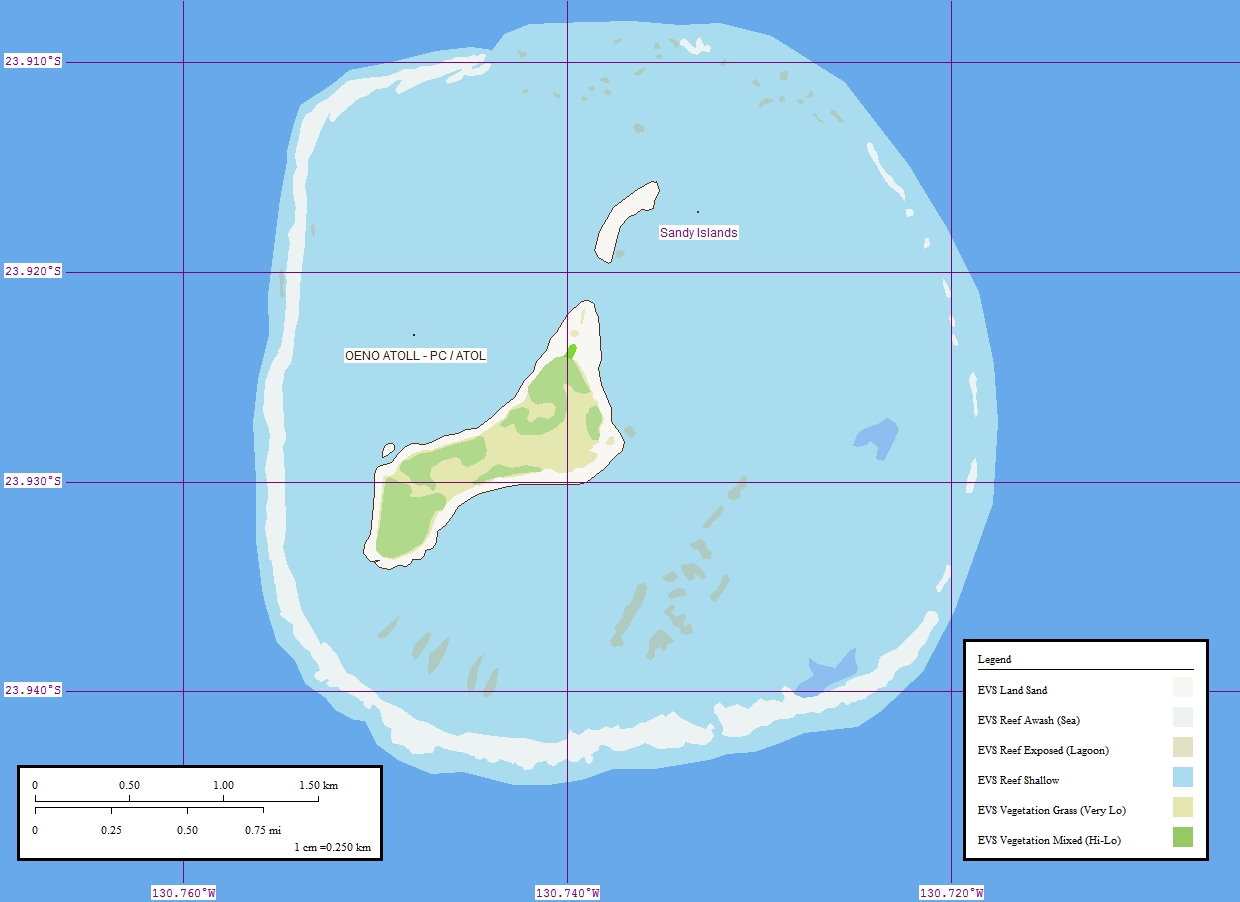
Map of Oeno Island

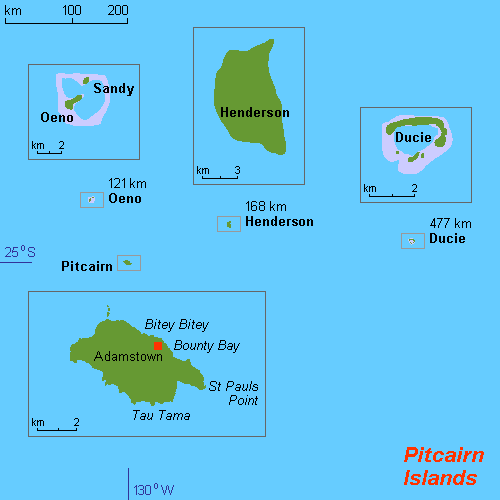
Map of Pitcairn Islands

== History ==
- January 1819: Captain James Henderson of the British East India Company ship Hercules sights Oeno Island
- 1822–1823 Captain Ralph Bond in sealing brig Martha of London saw this island, presumably in the summer/autumn of 1822.
- 26 January 1824: Captain George Worth aboard the American whaler Oeno, names the atoll after his ship
- 5 March 1858: The Wild Wave, a 1500-ton clipper ship sailing from San Francisco, is wrecked on Oeno's reef
- 1875: The Khandeish is wrecked on Oeno
- 23 August 1883: The Oregon is wrecked on Oeno
- April 1893: The Bowdon is wrecked on Oeno
- 10 July 1902: Oeno is annexed by the United Kingdom
- 1938: Oeno is incorporated into the Pitcairn Islands colony
- 1997: Polynesian rats are exterminated

== See also ==
- Desert island
- List of islands
