= Topknot =

Topknot may refer to:

- A hairstyle or haircut, historically prevalent in Asia:
  - Chonmage, a traditional Japanese haircut worn by men
  - Sangtu (상투), a Korean topknot
  - Touji (頭髻), a traditional Chinese hairstyle which involves tying all hair into a bun, worn from earliest times up to the end of the Ming Dynasty and still worn by Taoist priests and practitioners
  - joora, worn by Sikh men
  - The Suebian knot, is a historical male hairstyle ascribed to the tribe of the Germanic Suebi
  - Tikitiki, a top-knot worn by high-ranking Māori men
  - Man bun, a modern Western style of topknot influenced by the Asian style, a trend beginning in the 2010s
- Several species of fish:
  - The New Zealand topknot, Notoclinus fenestratus
  - The Norwegian topknot, Phrynorhombus norvegicus
  - The Brown topknot, Notoclinus compressus
  - Several species in the genus Zeugopterus
- Topknot pigeon, Lopholaimus antarcticus
