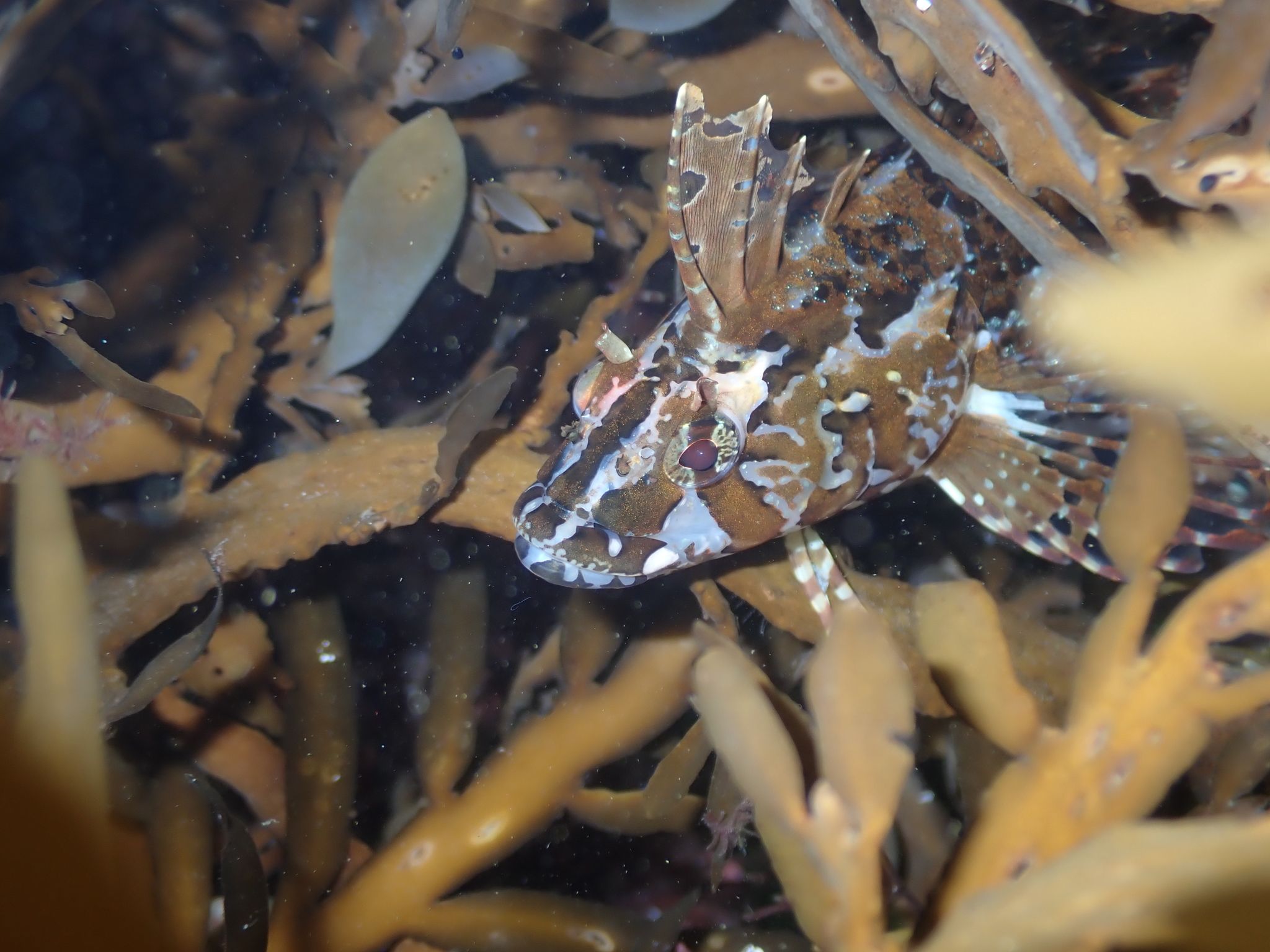
- Notoclinus fenestratus

Scientific classification
- Kingdom: Animalia
- Phylum: Chordata
- Class: Actinopterygii
- Division: Teleostei
- Order: Blenniiformes
- Family: Tripterygiidae
- Subfamily: Notoclininae
- Genus: Notoclinus; Gill, 1893

Type species
- Blennius fenestratus Forster, 1801

Species
- See text.

= Notoclinus =

Genus of fishes

Notoclinus is a genus of triplefins in the family Tripterygiidae.

== Species ==
- Brown topknot, Notoclinus compressus (Hutton, 1872)
- New Zealand topknot, Notoclinus fenestratus (Forster, 1801)
