= Kabuto =

Japanese combat helmet

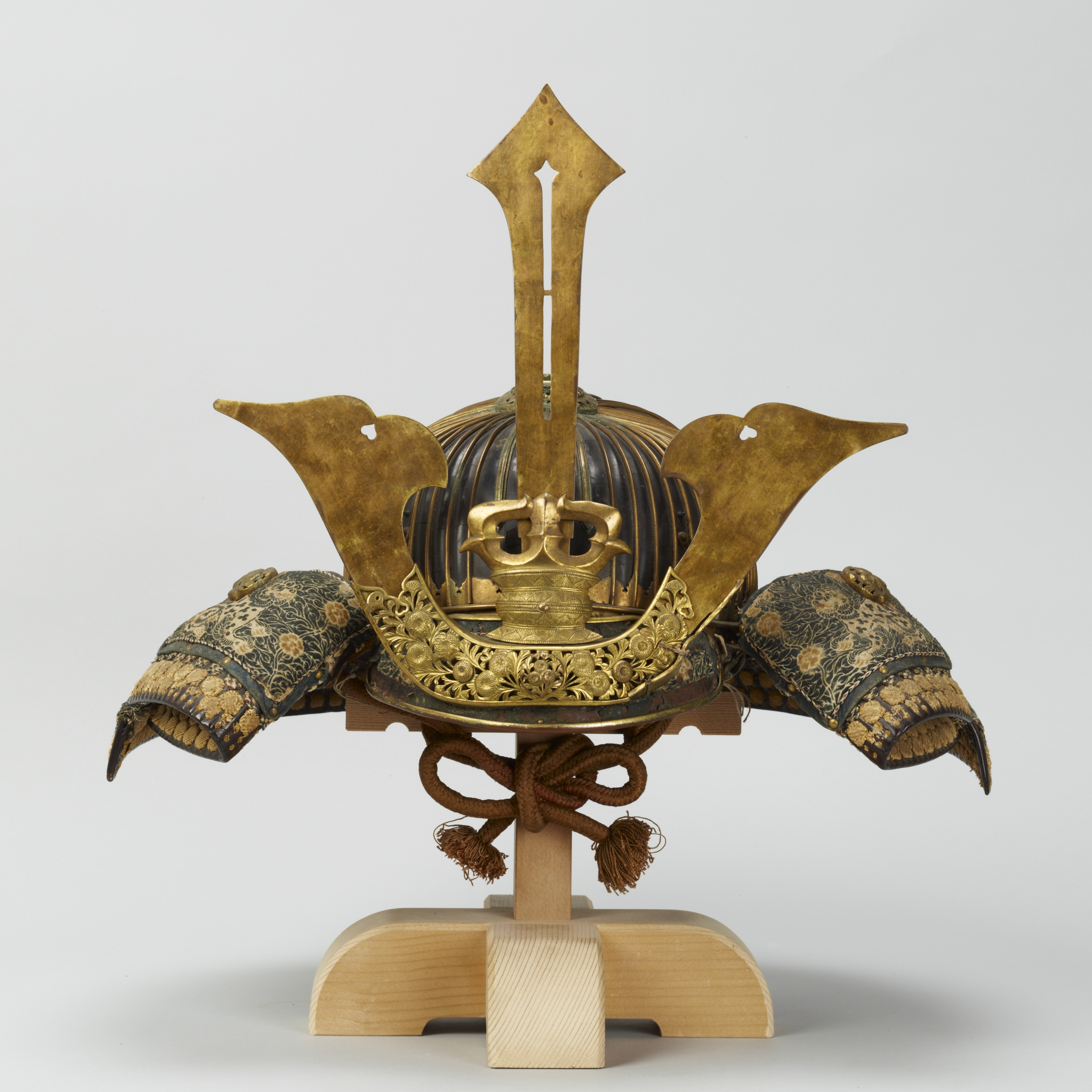
Dō-maru kabuto. Muromachi period, 15th century, Tokyo National Museum, Important Cultural Property

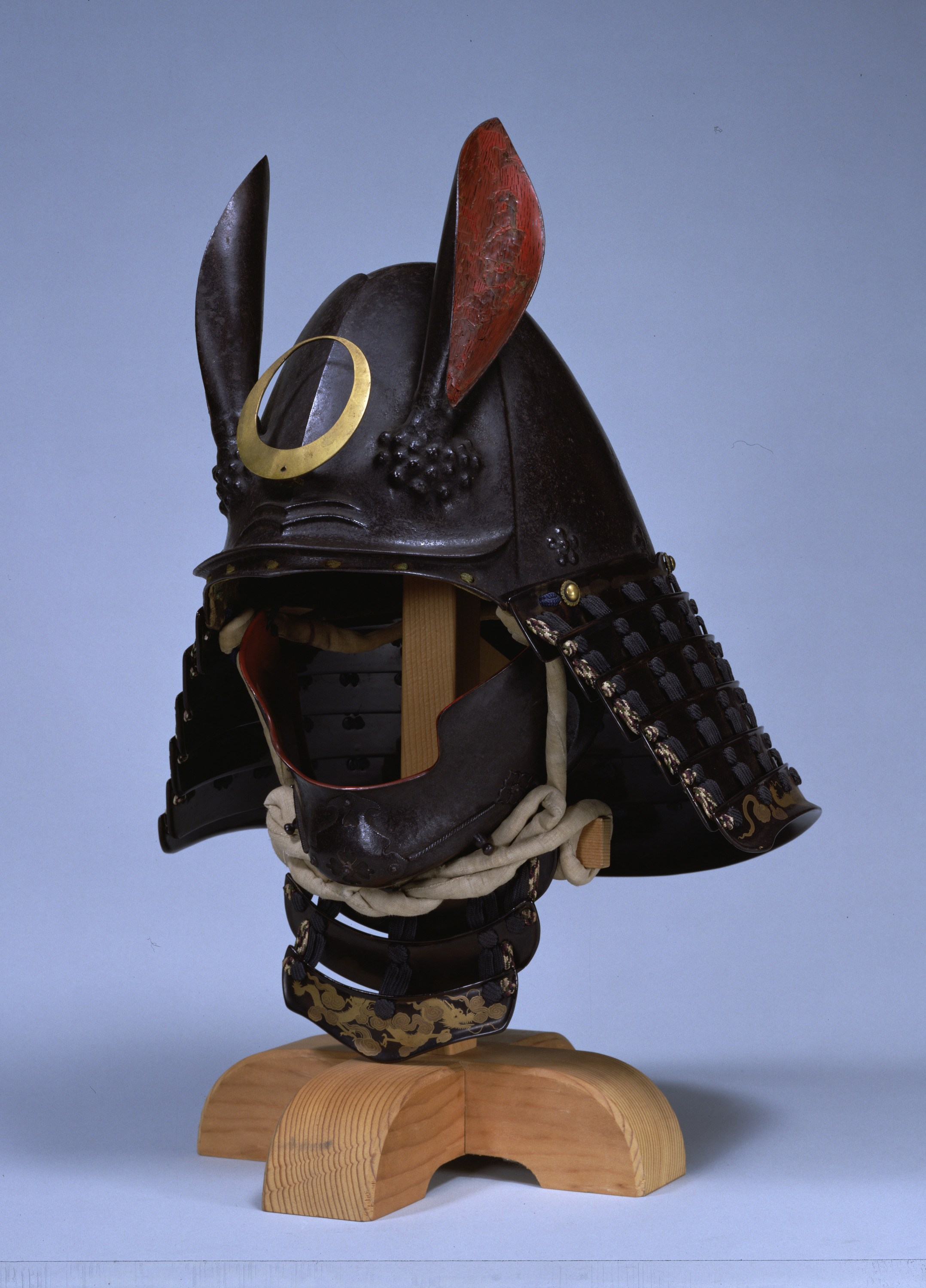
Kabuto of gusoku (Tosei-gusoku) armor European-style cuirass, 16th - 17th century, Azuchi-Momoyama - Edo period, Tokyo National Museum

Kabuto (兜, 冑) is a type of helmet first used by ancient Japanese warriors that, in later periods, became an important part of the traditional Japanese armour worn by the samurai class and their retainers in feudal Japan.

Note that in the Japanese language, the word kabuto is an appellative, not a type description, and can refer to any combat helmet.

Every year on Children's Day, May 5, Japanese households display miniature kabuto and samurai armor in keeping with the tradition of Tango no Sekku. In feudal times, real samurai armor, kabuto, and tachi were displayed.

== History ==
Japanese helmets dating from the fifth century have been found in excavated tombs. Called mabizashi-tsuke kabuto (attached-visor helmet), the style of these kabuto came from China and Korea. They had a pronounced central ridge.

Kabuto, now known as samurai helmets, first appeared in the 10th century Heian period with the appearance of ō-yoroi. Until the early Muromachi period, kabuto were made by combining dozens of thin iron plates. Generally, only daimyo and samurai at the rank of commander wore kabuto ornaments called datemono (立物), which were shaped like a pair of hoes. In the middle of the Muromachi period, as the number of large group battles increased, ordinary samurai wore datemono in the shape of a hoe, the sun, the moon, or their flag on their kabuto to show their courage or to distinguish friend from foe.

In the Sengoku period in the 16th century, when the scale of war increased and the guns called tanegashima became popular, the armor styles called ō-yoroi and dō-maru became outdated. As a response to the popularity of tanegashima, the armor style of tosei-gusoku (当世具足) was created. Tosei-gusoku kabuto were made by combining three to four pieces of iron plates. These were more bulletproof than the conventional style and could be mass produced. The tatemono became more eccentric and huge. Some were made of iron, but for safety reasons on the battlefield, they were often made with molded, lacquer-coated paper. In the Azuchi–Momoyama period, tosei-gusoku kabuto had a simple, bold design in accordance with the popularity of Momoyama culture.

In the Edo period, the Tokugawa shogunate defeated the Toyotomi clan in the Summer Siege of Osaka. Japanese society became more peaceful and medieval armor styles were revived. Ō‑yoroi- and dō‑maru‑style kabuto were made again. Ornamental kawari kabuto ("strange helmet") were made during this time that had "figures of animals, [kami], or various other objects mounted on top of them". Kabuto during this time were made "from materials including iron, gold-copper alloy, lacquer, leather, silk, wood, gesso, bone[,] and gesso binder".

The kabuto was an important part of the equipment of the samurai, and played a symbolic role as well, which may explain the Japanese expressions, sayings, and codes related to them. For instance, Katte kabuto no o wo shimeyo translates literally to "Tighten the string of the kabuto after winning the war". This refers to not reducing one's efforts after success; an equivalent saying in English would be "Don't rest on your laurels". Kabuto wo nugu (lit. "to take off the kabuto") means "to surrender".

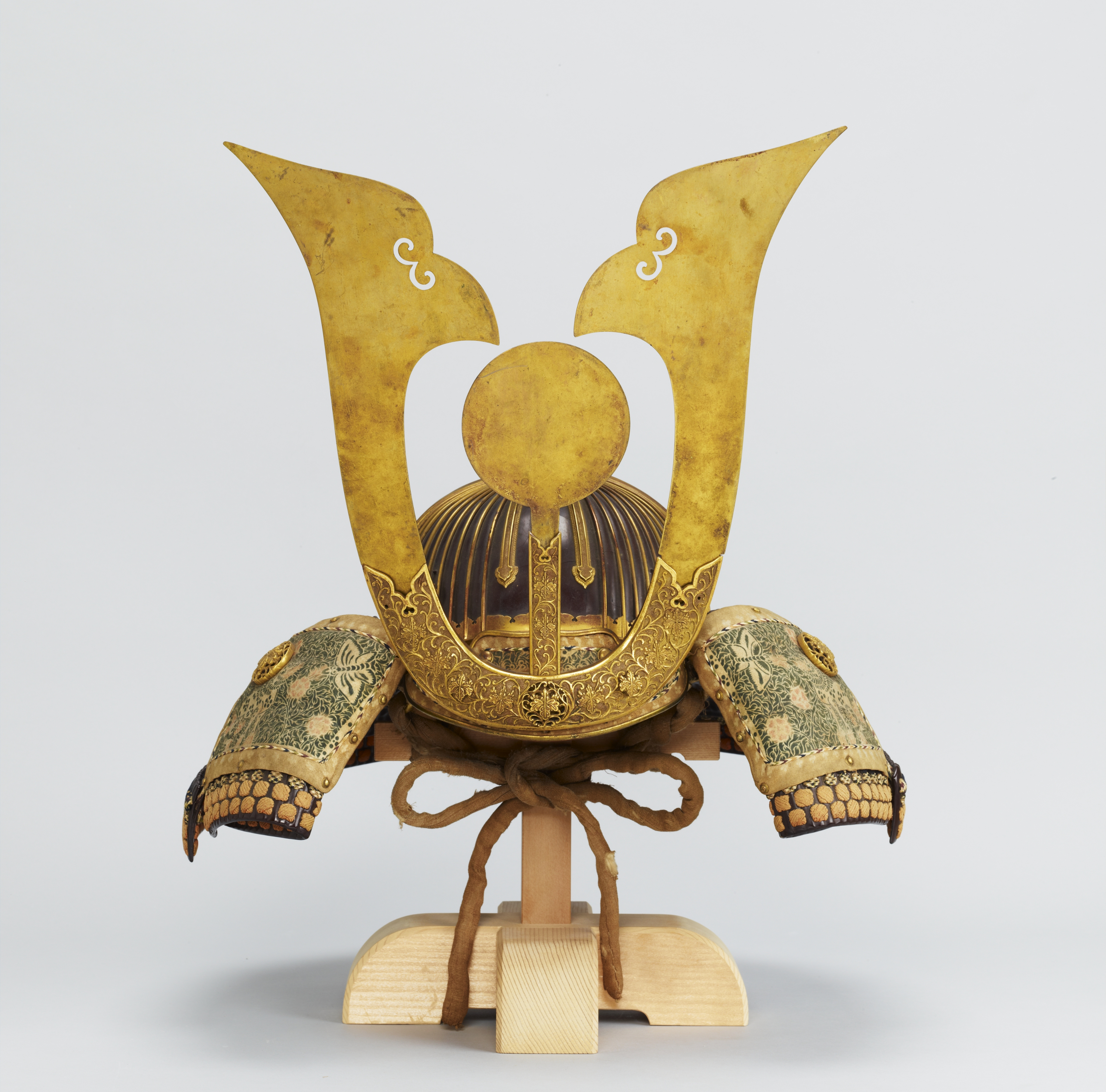
Dō-maru kabuto. Muromachi period, 15th century, Tokyo National Museum, Important Cultural Property

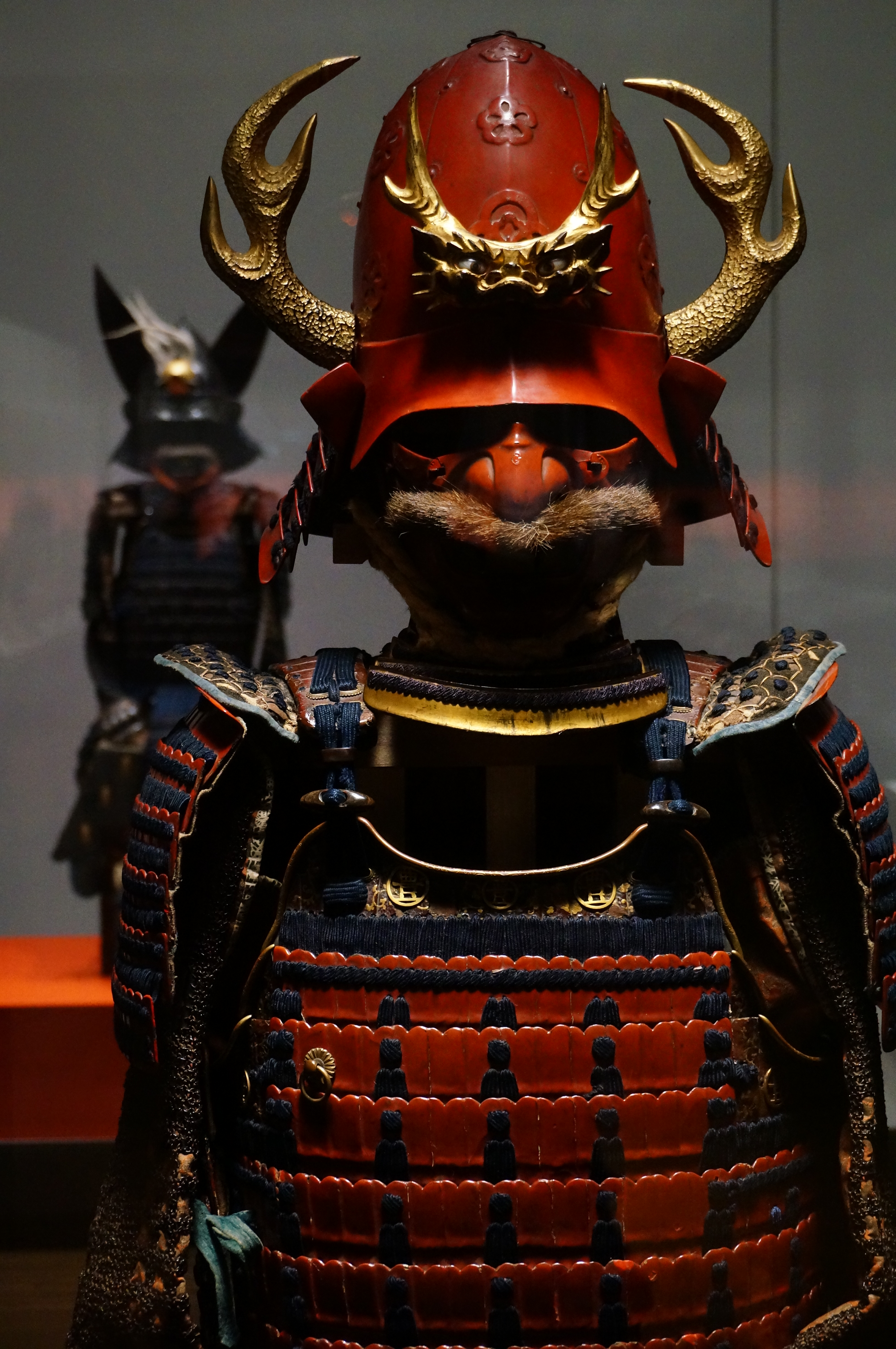
Gusoku kabuto. Azuchi–Momoyama period, 16th–17th century, Suntory Museum of Art

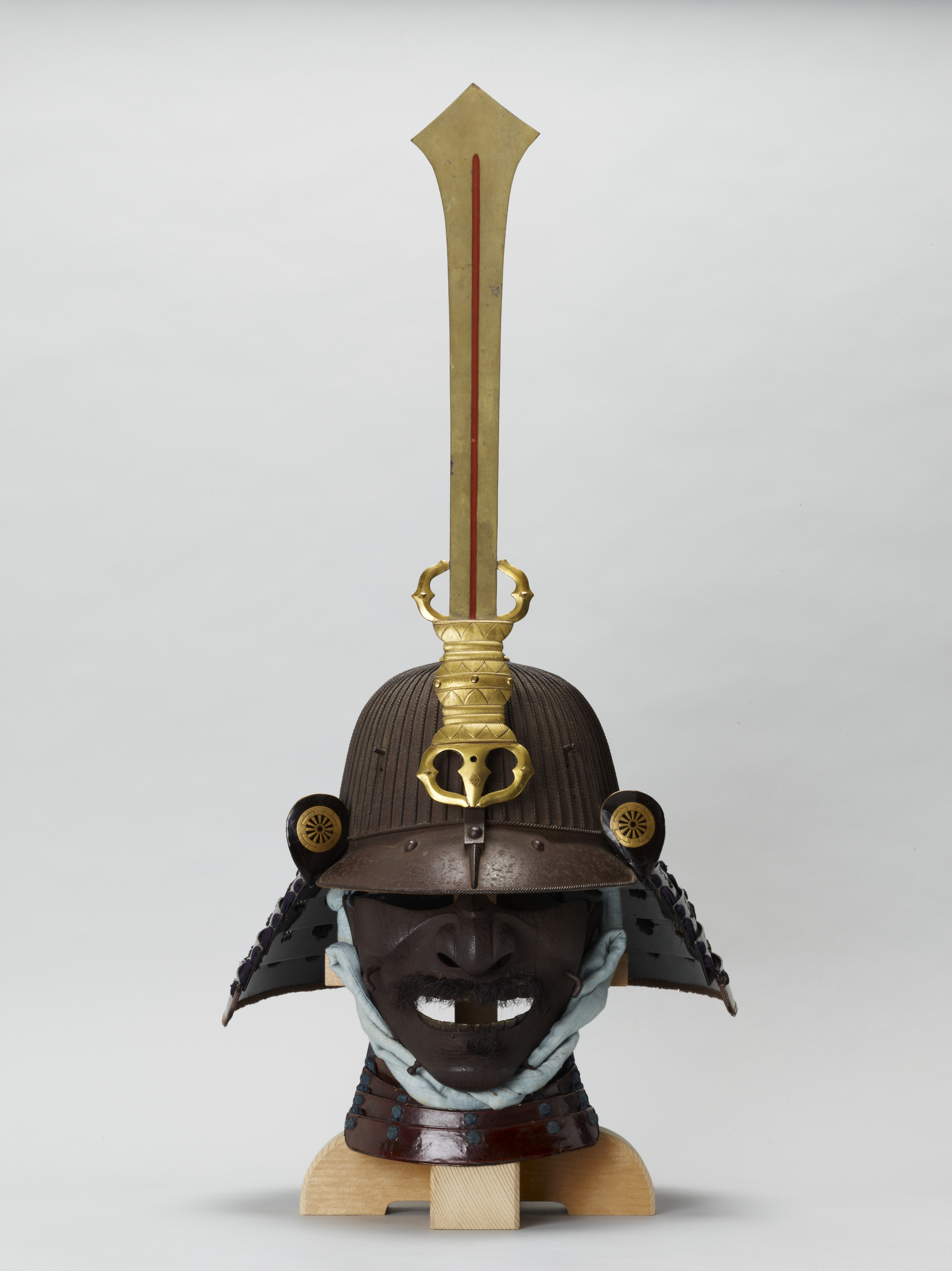
Gusoku kabuto, attributed to Sakakibara Yasumasa. Edo period, 17th century, Tokyo National Museum, Important Cultural Property

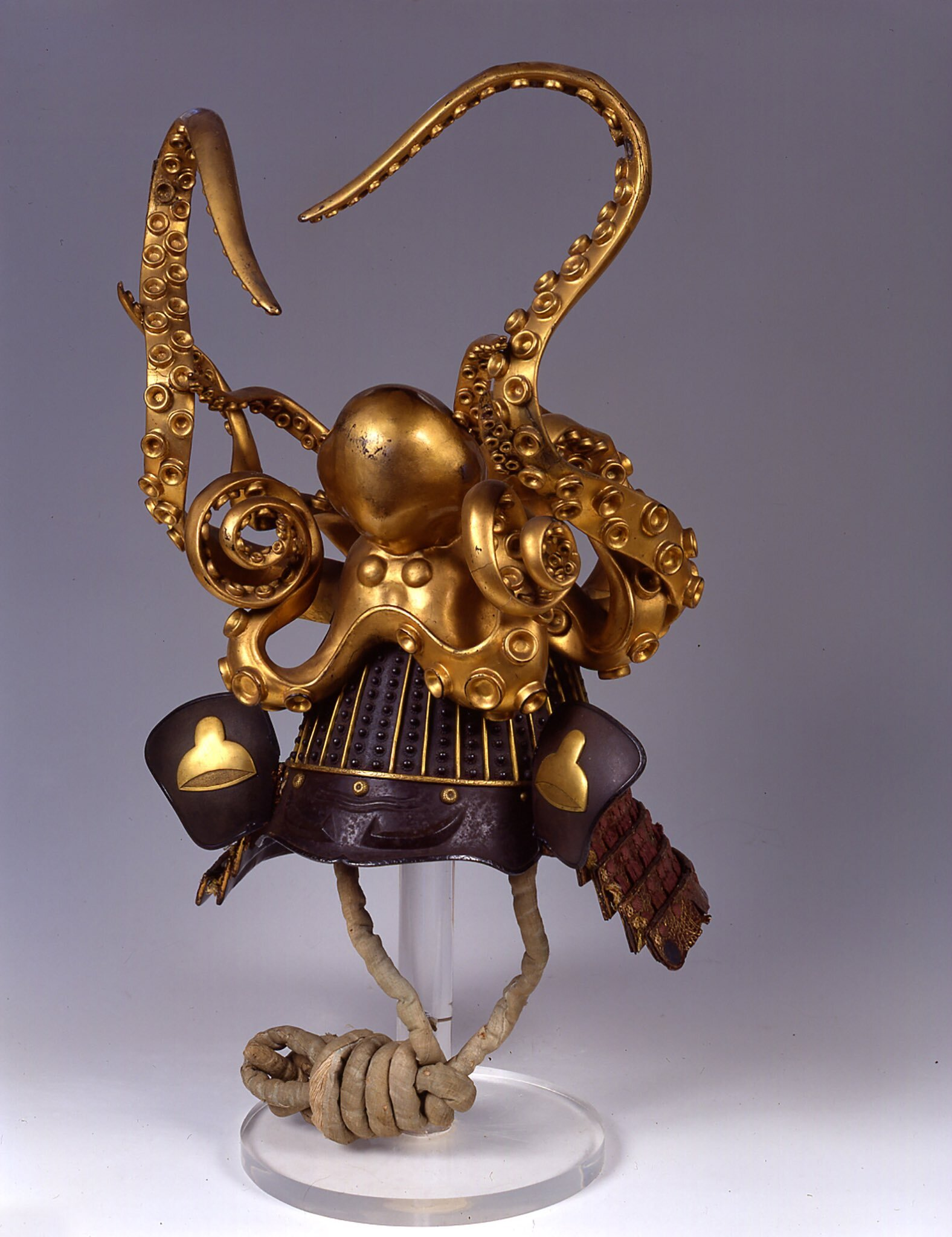
Kawari kabuto with octopus. 18th century, Edo period. Stibbert Museum

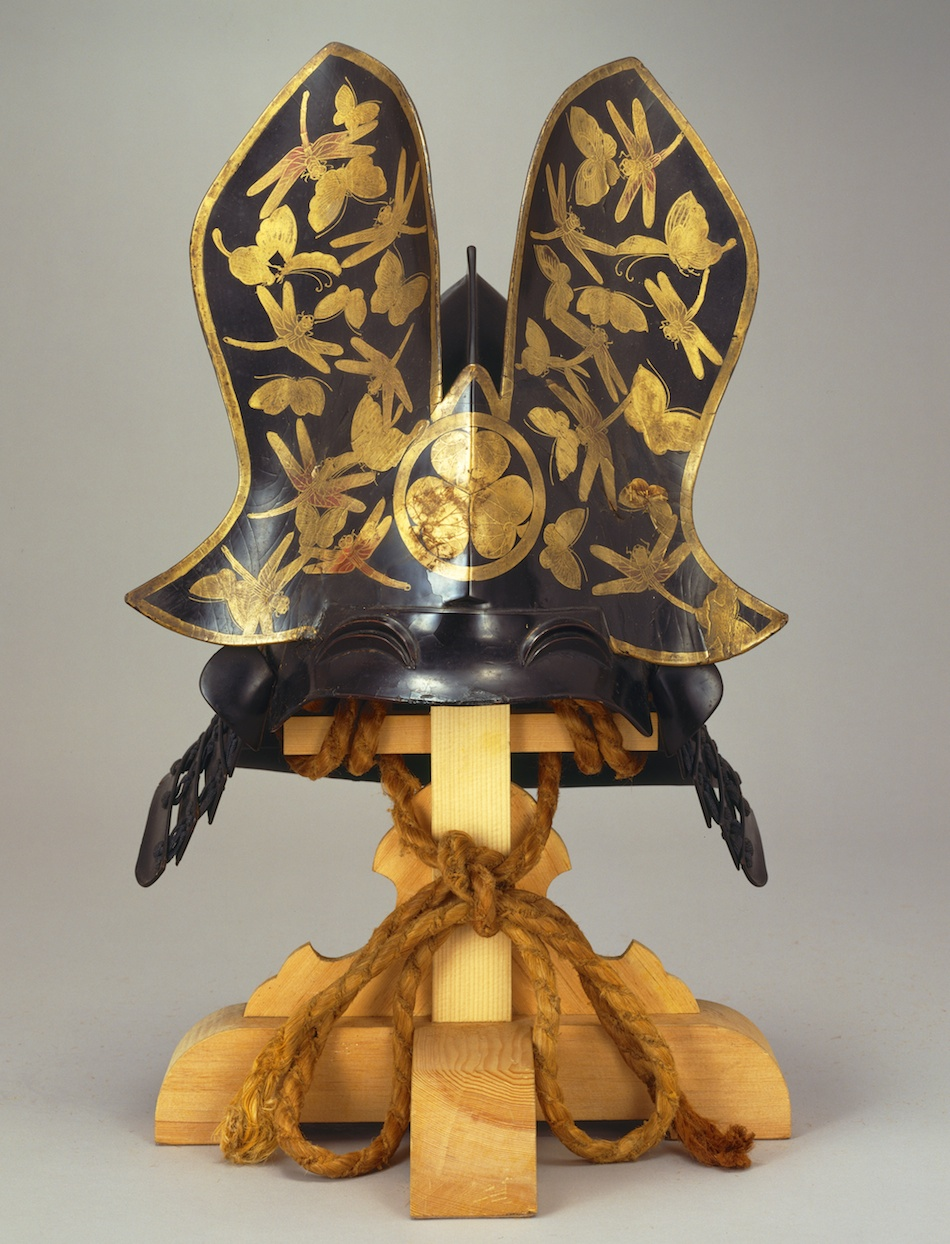
Fancy Kabuto with Tokugawa Clan Crest and Design of Butterflies and Dragonflies. Edo period, 18th century. Tokyo Fuji Art Museum

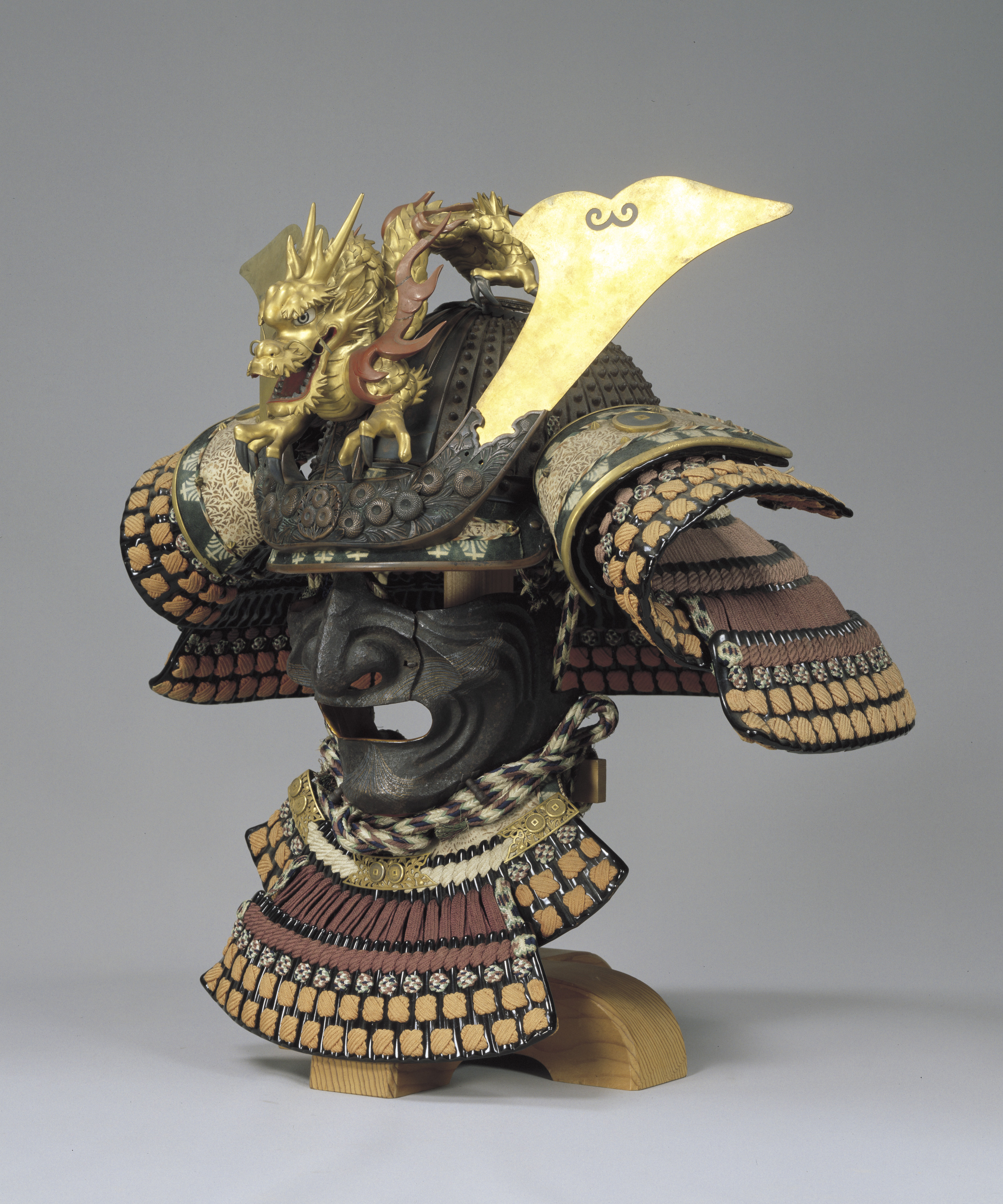
Dō-maru style kabuto with a medieval revival style. Edo period, 19th century, Tokyo National Museum.

== Parts of the kabuto ==
Media related to Kabuto (individual parts) at Wikimedia Commons

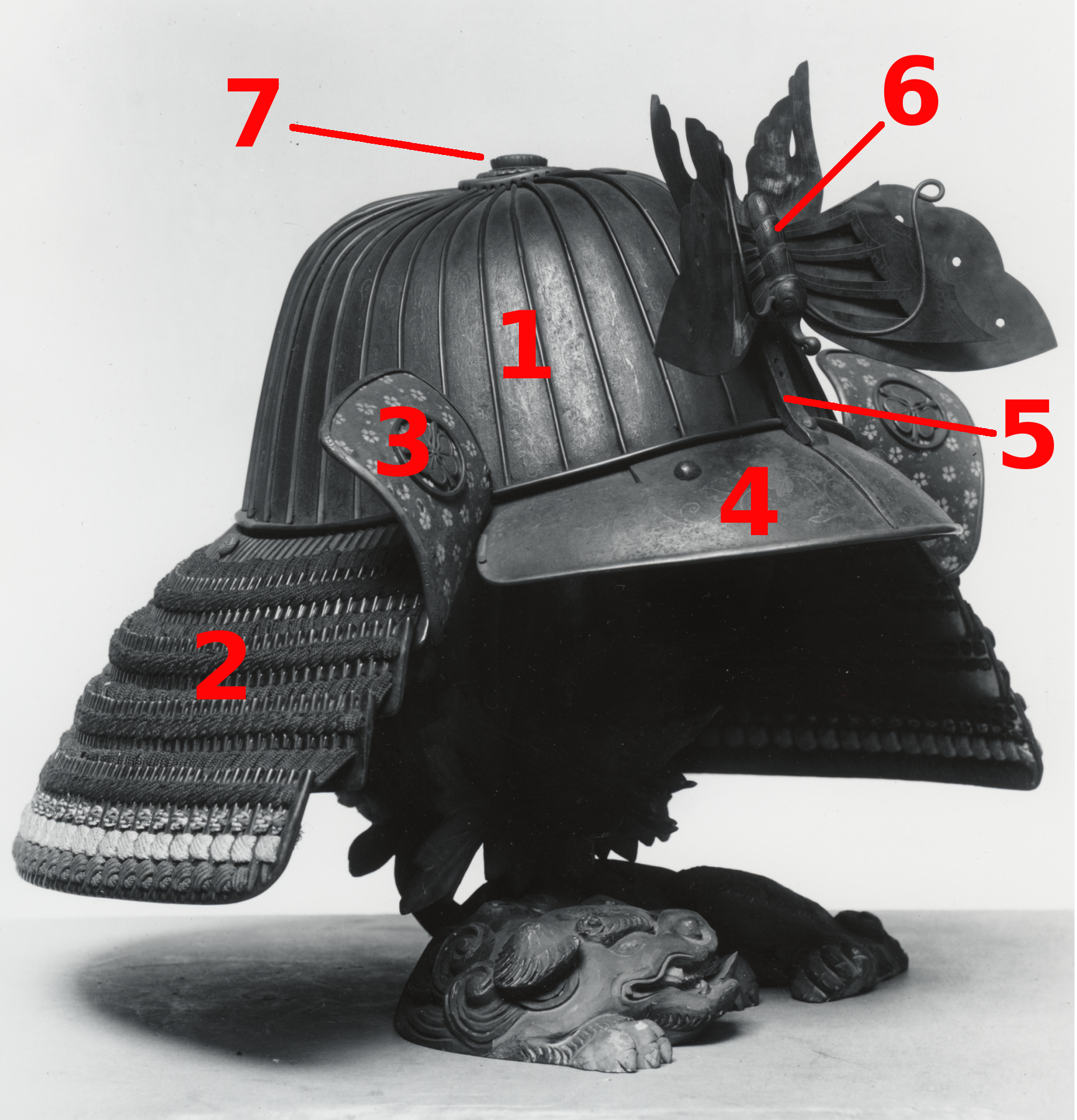
1. hachi; 2. shikoro; 3. fukigaeshi; 4. mae-zashi; 5. hari-date; 6. datemono; 7. hachimanza

The basic parts of the kabuto include:

- Hachi, a dome composed of overlapping elongated plates called tate hagi-no-ita
- Tehen, a small opening at the top of the hachi, usually fitted with a tehen kanamono (an ornamental grommet, often resembling a chrysanthemum)
- Mabizashi, a brim or visor on the front of the hachi
- Ukebari, a cloth lining inside the hachi
- Tsunamoto, mounting points for attaching crests
- Kasa jirushi no kan, a ring at the back of the hachi for securing a kasa jirushi (helmet flag)
- Fukigaeshi, wing-like or ear-like projections to the sides of the hachi
- Shikoro, a suspended neck guard composed of multiple overlapping lames
- Shinobi-no-o (chin cord), often used to secure the mengu (facial armour)

A typical kabuto features a central dome constructed of anywhere from three to over a hundred metal plates riveted together. These were usually arranged vertically, radiating from a small opening in the top. The rivets securing these metal plates to each other could be raised (a form known as hoshi-bachi) or hammered flat (a form known as suji-bachi); another form, called hari bachi, had the rivets filed flush. Some of the finer hachi were signed by their makers, usually from one of several known families, such as the Myochin, Saotome, Haruta, Unkai, or Nagasone families.

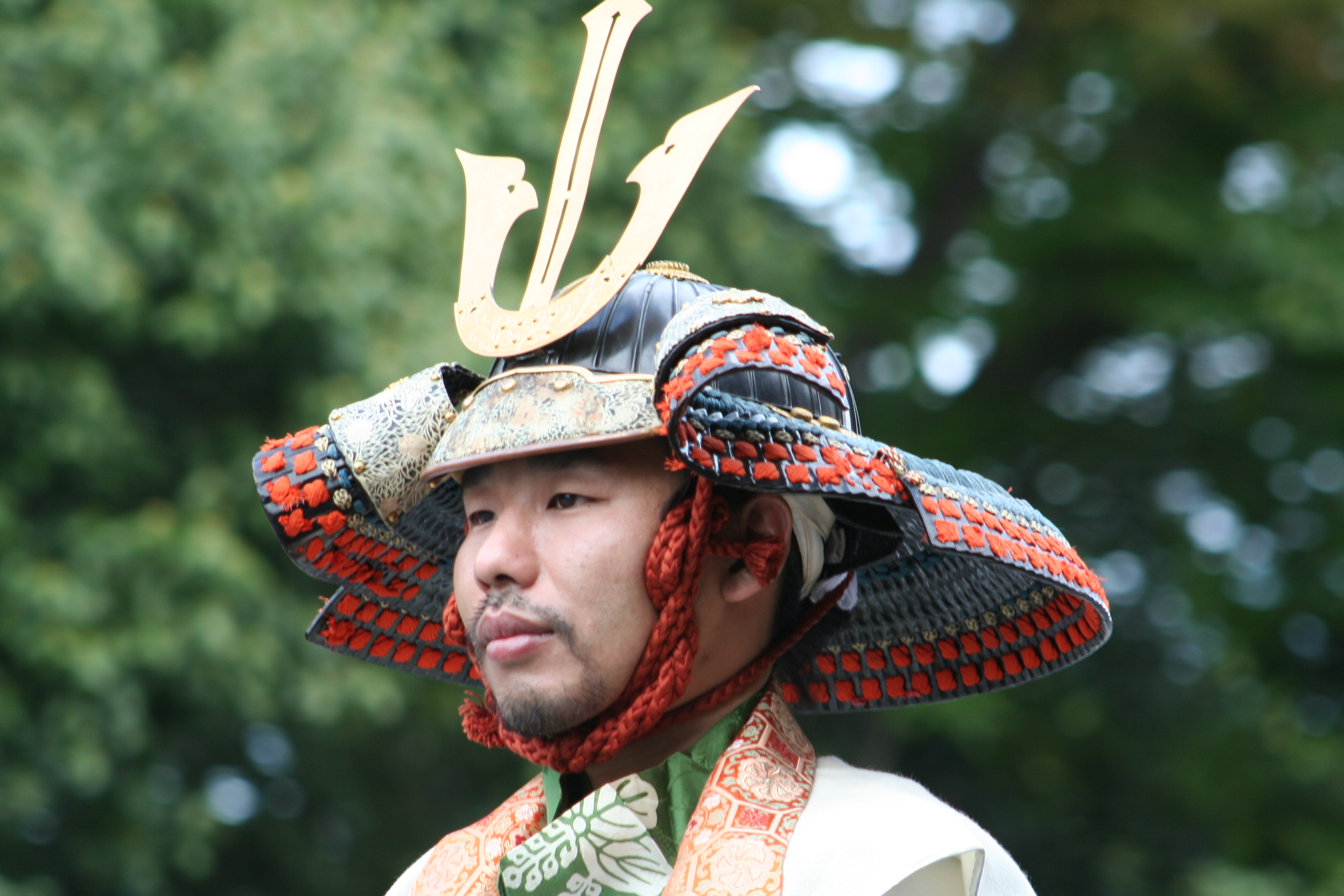
A suji bachi kabuto with the cords tied under the chin; note the prominent front crest, the recurving fukigaeshi, and the shikoro composed of hundreds of interlaced scales

A small opening in the top of the kabuto, called the tehen or hachimanza (seat of the war god, Hachiman), was thought to be for passing the warrior's top knot through. Although this practice was largely abandoned after the Muromachi period, this opening may have been retained for purposes of ventilation or simply as an artifact of how the plates were riveted together. The tehen was usually decorated with tehen kanamono, which were rings of intricately worked, soft metal bands often resembling a chrysanthemum. Zunari kabuto and momonari kabuto were two helmet forms that did not usually have an opening at the top.

Kabuto incorporated a suspended neck guard called a shikoro, usually composed of three to seven semicircular, lacquered metal or oxhide lames, attached and articulated by silk or leather lacing, although some shikoro were composed of 100 or more small metal scales in a row. This lamellar armour style, along with kusari (mail armour), was the standard technology of Japanese body armour, and some shikoro were made of mail sewn to a cloth lining (a form called kusari shikoro).

The kabuto was secured to the head by a chin cord called shinobi-no-o, which would usually be tied to posts or hooks on the mengu (facial armour) or simply tied under the chin.

Kabuto are often adorned with crests called datemono or tatemono; the four types of decorations were the maedate (frontal decoration), wakidate (side decorations), kashiradate (top decoration), and ushirodate (rear decoration). These can be family crests (mon), or flat or sculptural objects representing animals, mythical entities, prayers or other symbols. Horns are particularly common, and many kabuto incorporate kuwagata, stylized antlers.

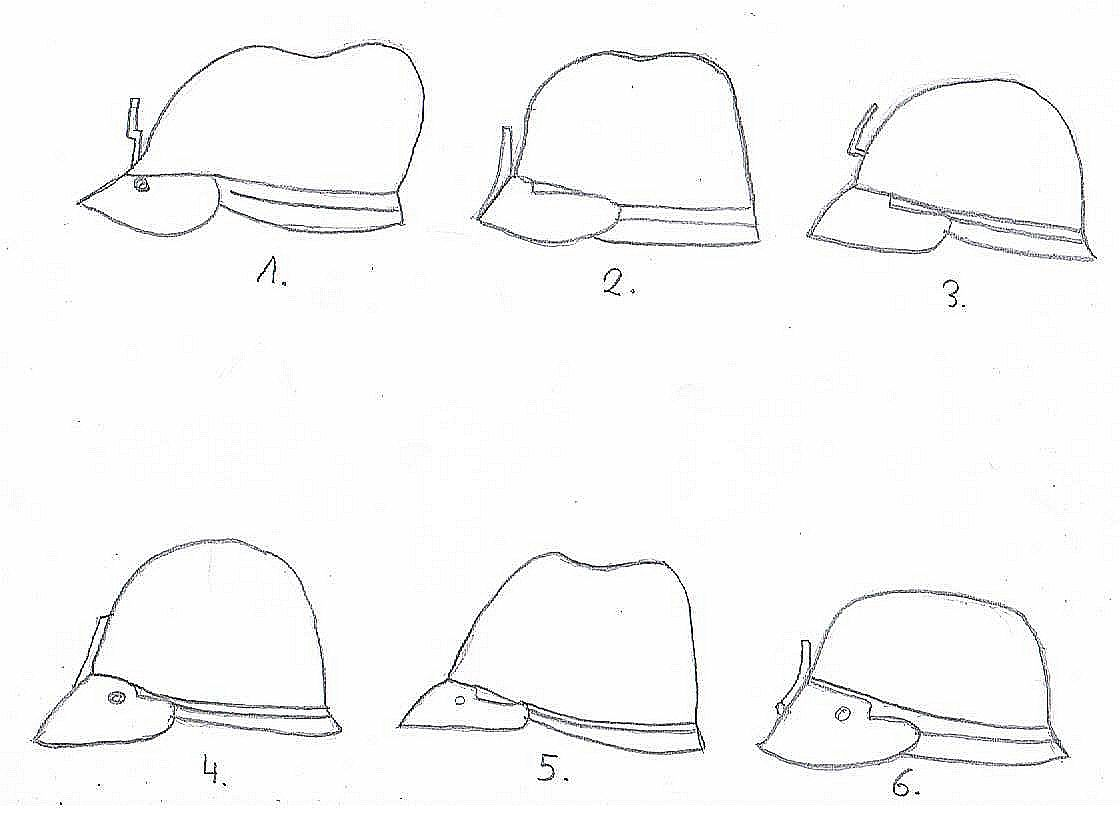
Various hachi shapes:
1. Nari akoda
2. Goshozan
3. Heichozan
4. Koseizan
5. Tenkokuzan
6. Zenshozan

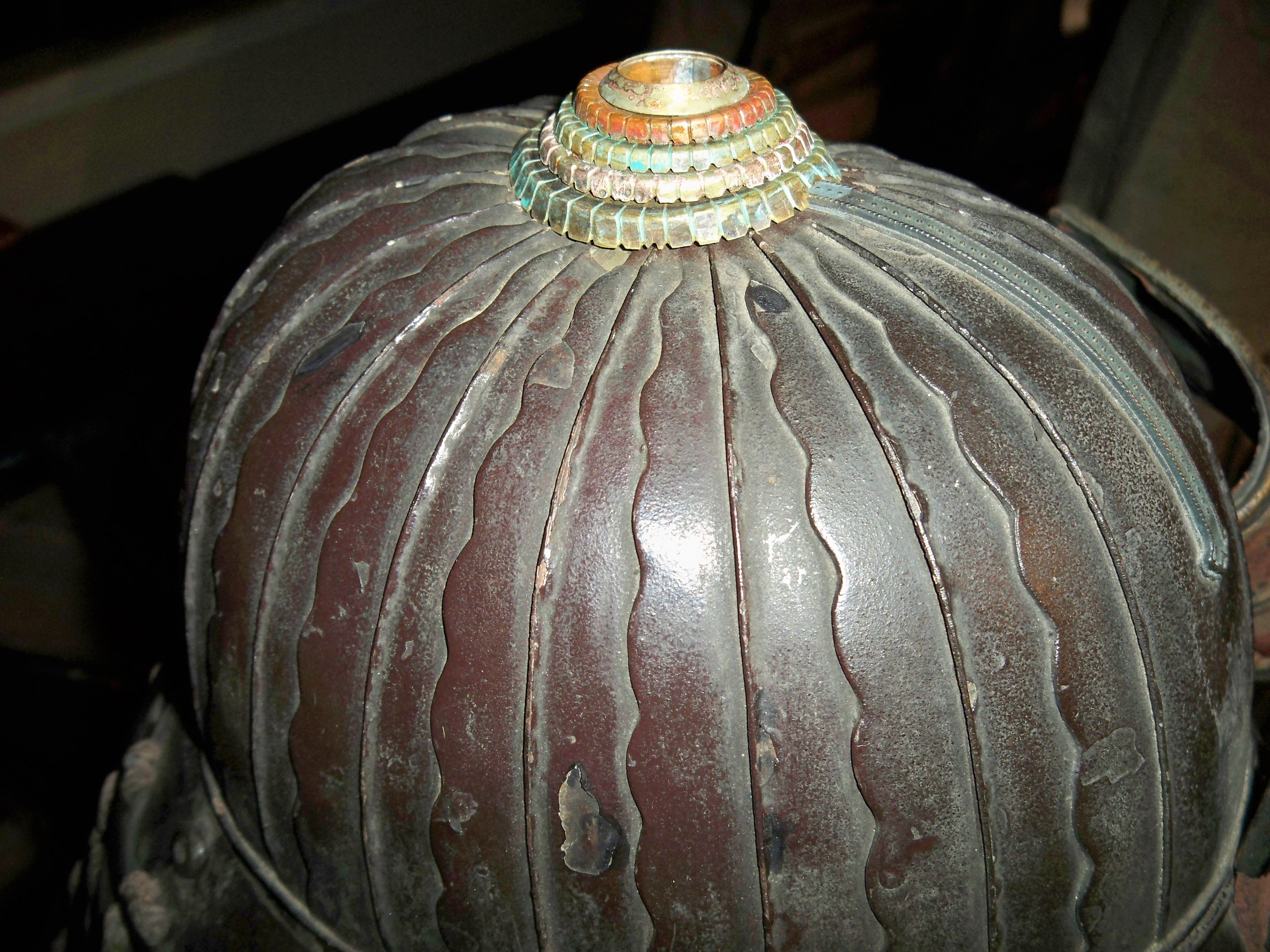
Many wavy shaped hagi-no-ita plates form a hachi. A colourful tehen kanamono can be seen at the top.

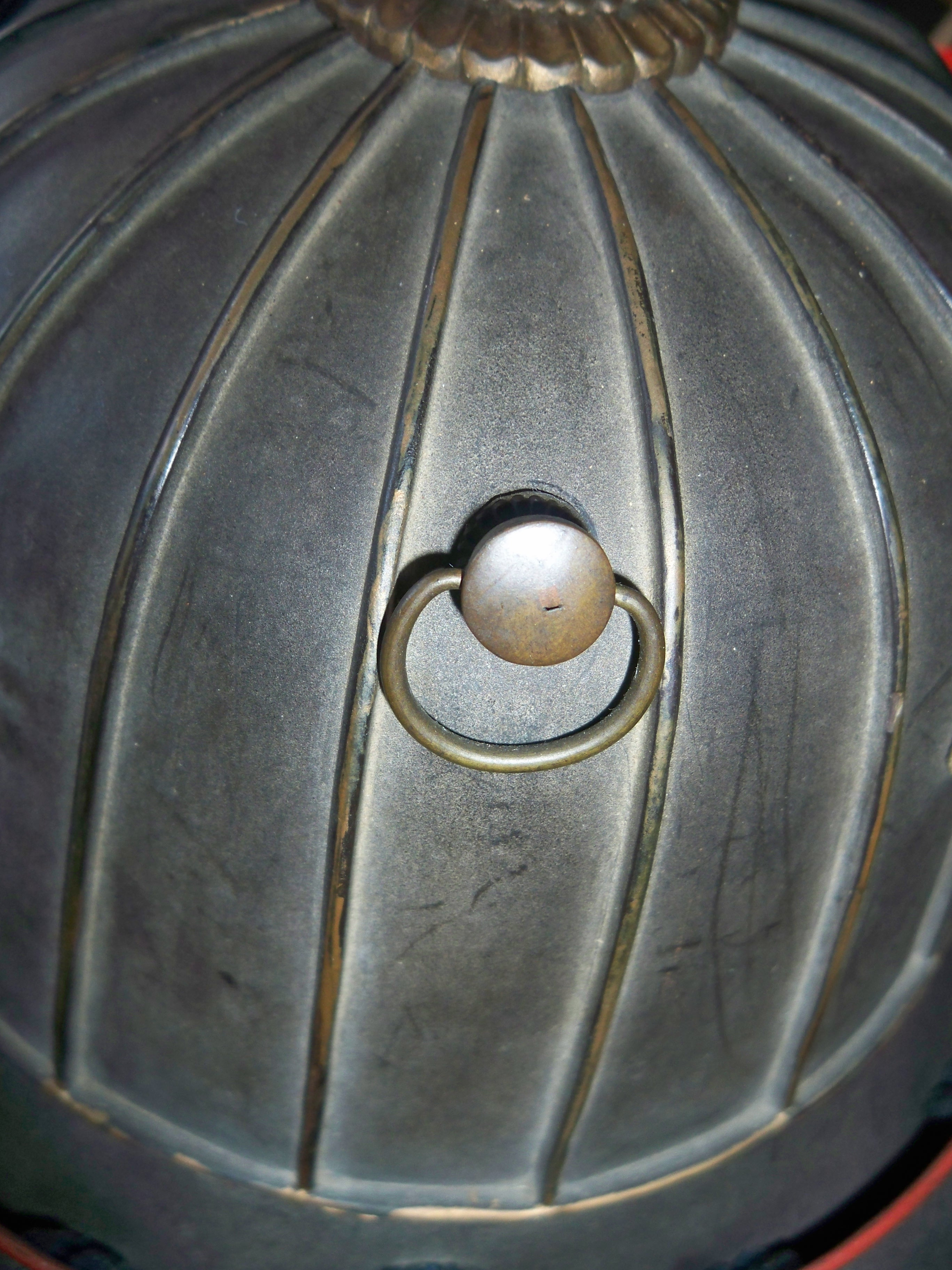
Kasa jirushi no kan, a ring for securing a kasa jirushi (helmet flag) to the hachi

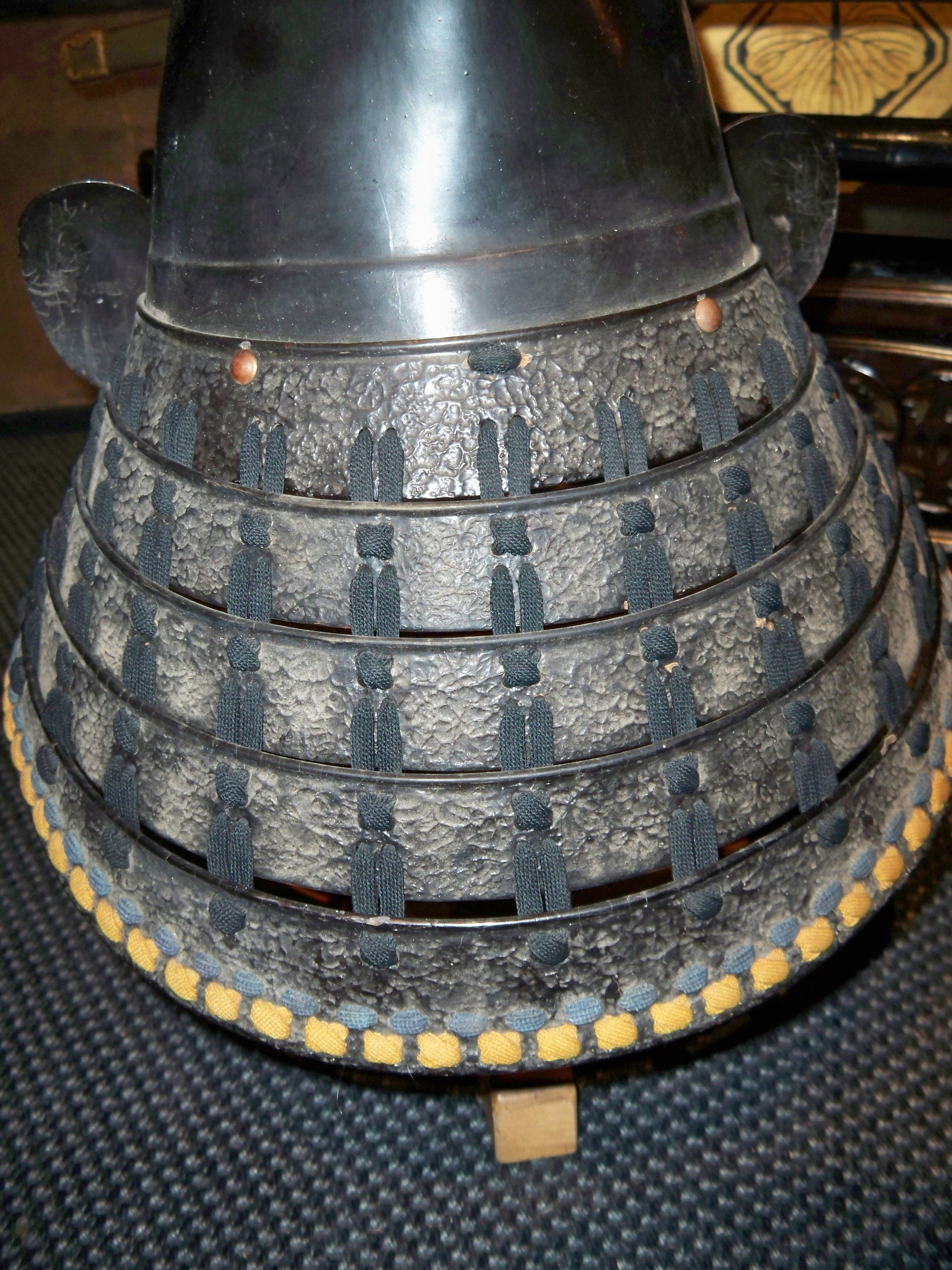
Lacquered iron shikoro (neck guard)

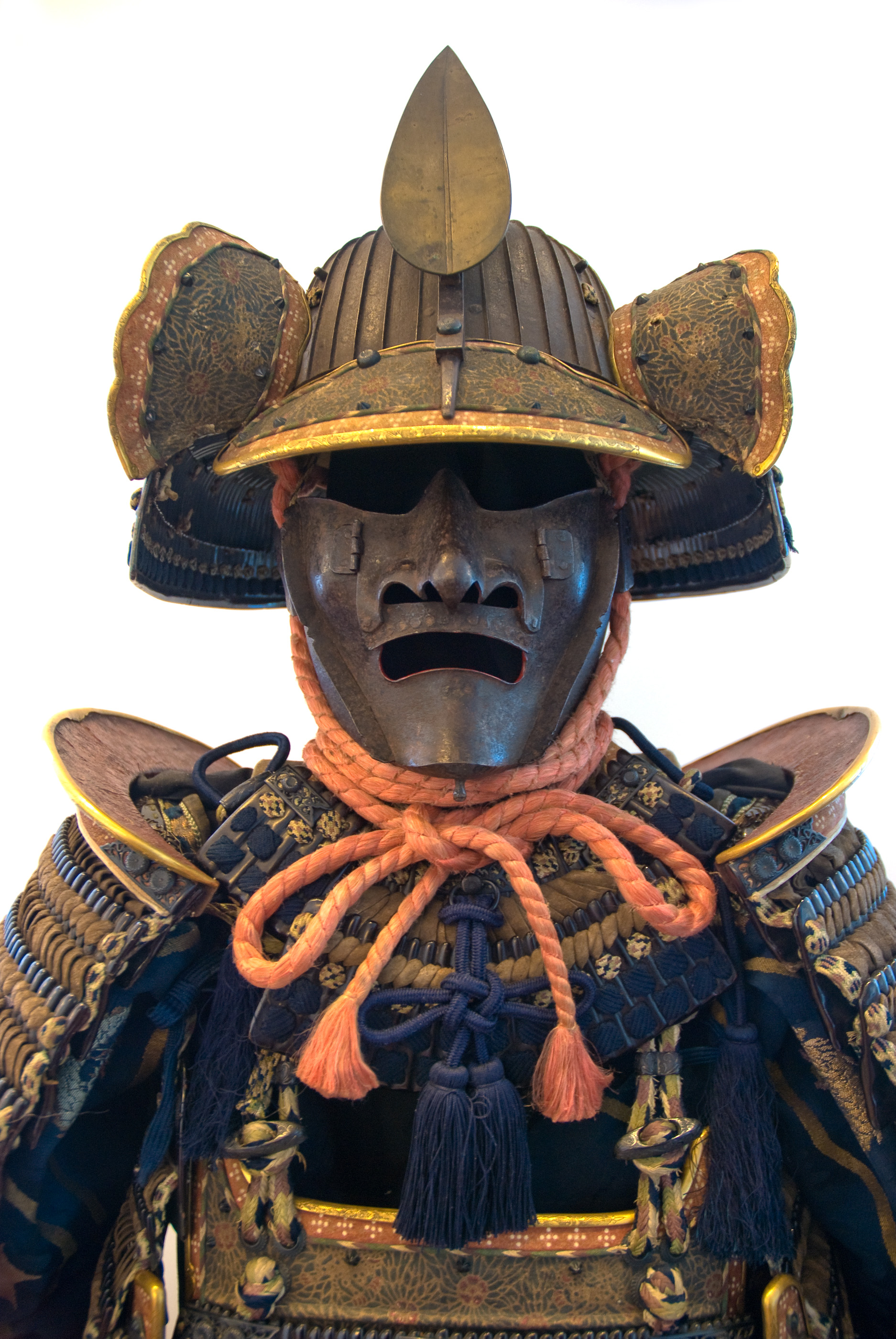
The fukigaeshi can be seen to both sides of the mabizashi (brim), and the shinobi-no-o (cord) secures the mengu (facial armour).

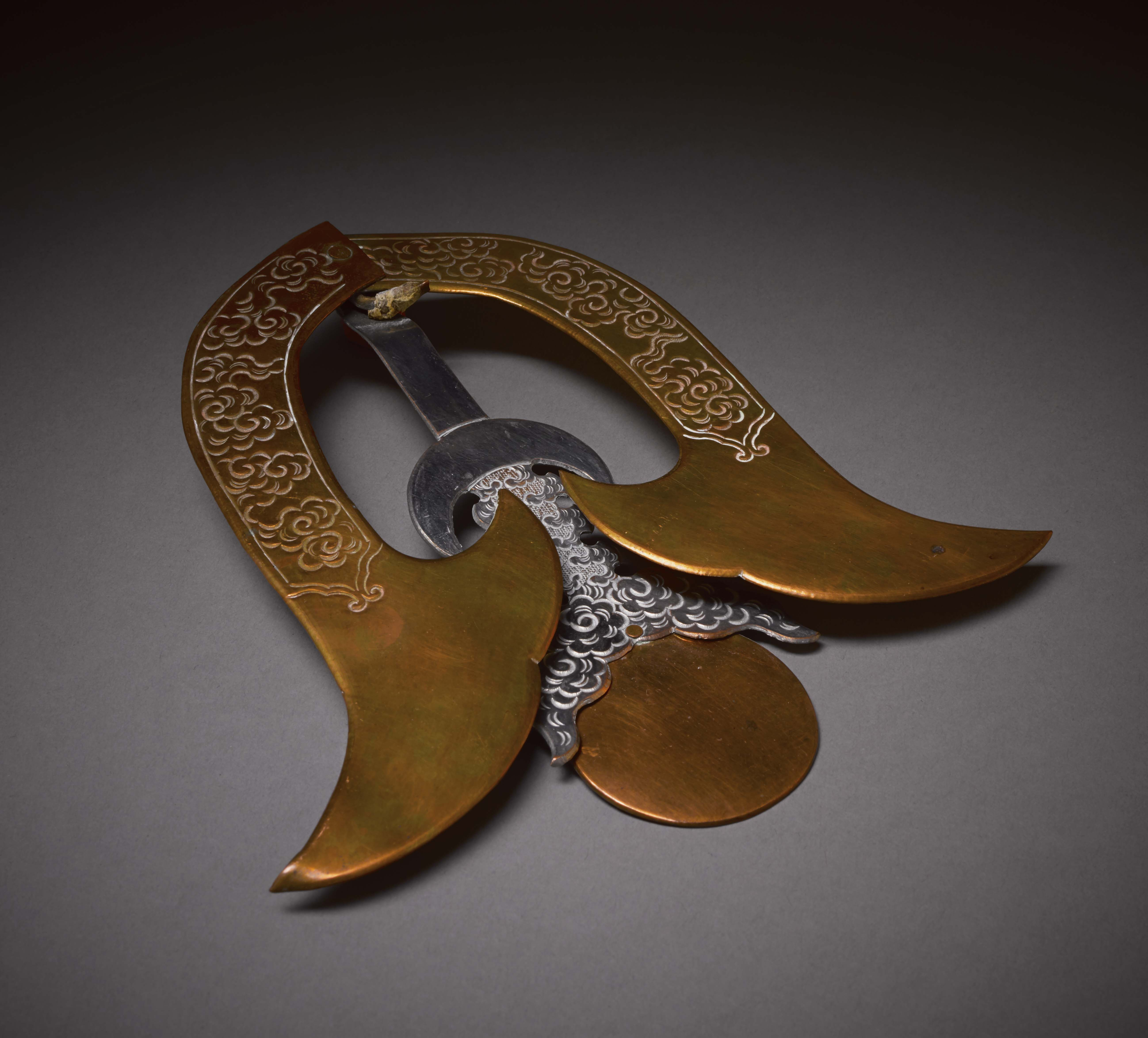
Maedate, c. 1800–1894, from the Oxford College Archives of Emory University

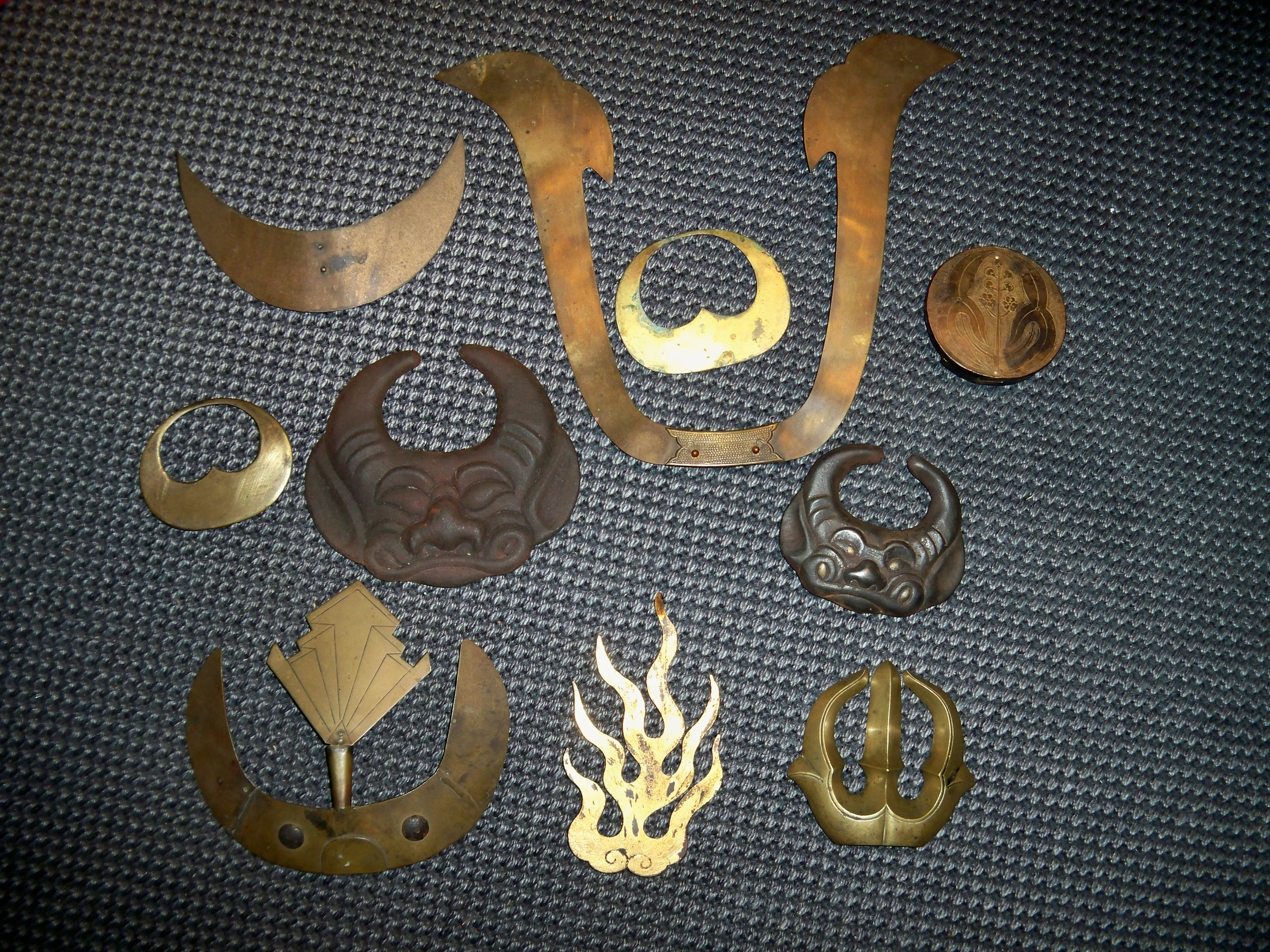
Various kabuto maedate (front crests)

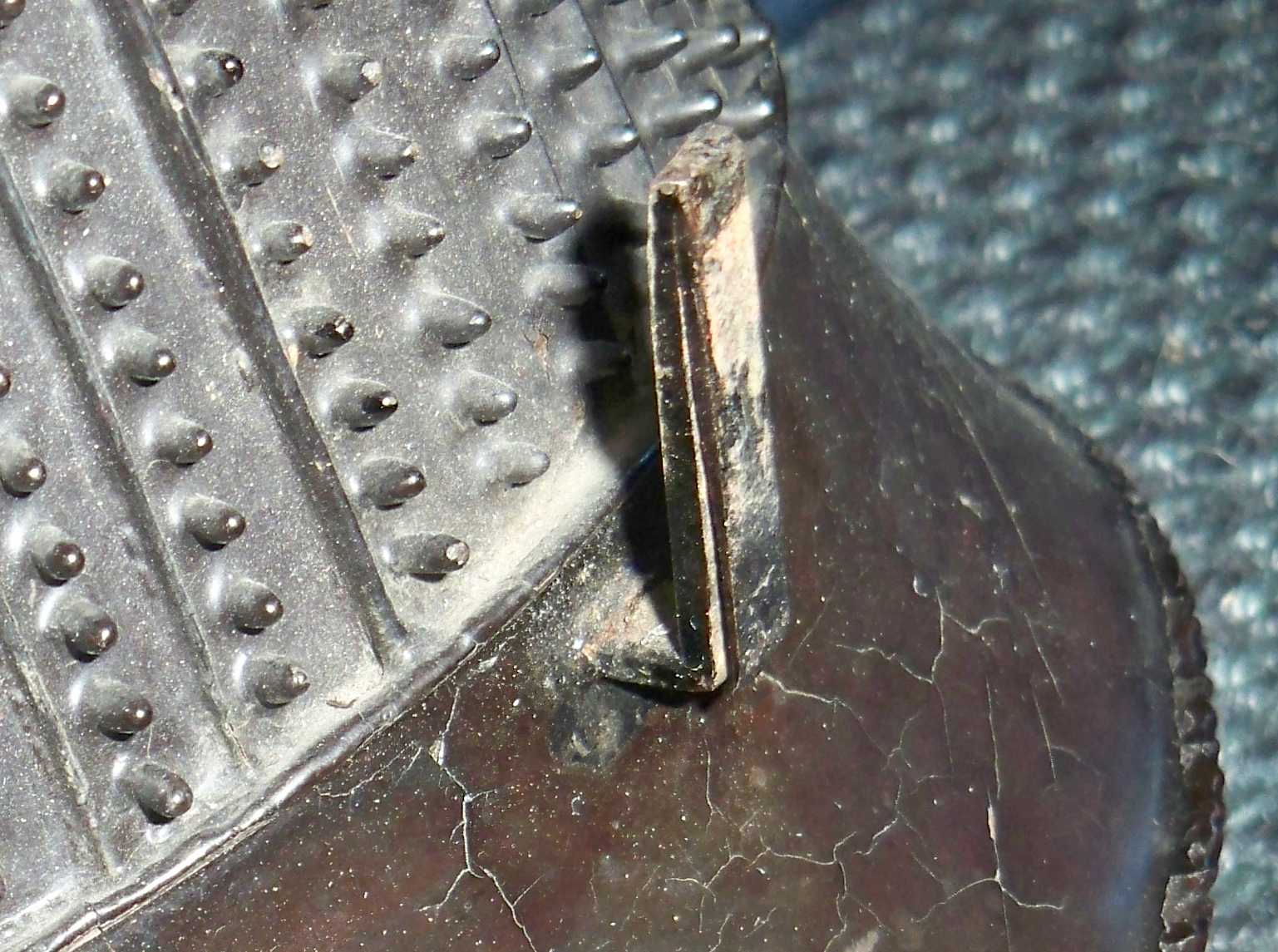
Maedate tsunamoto (mounting point for front crest)

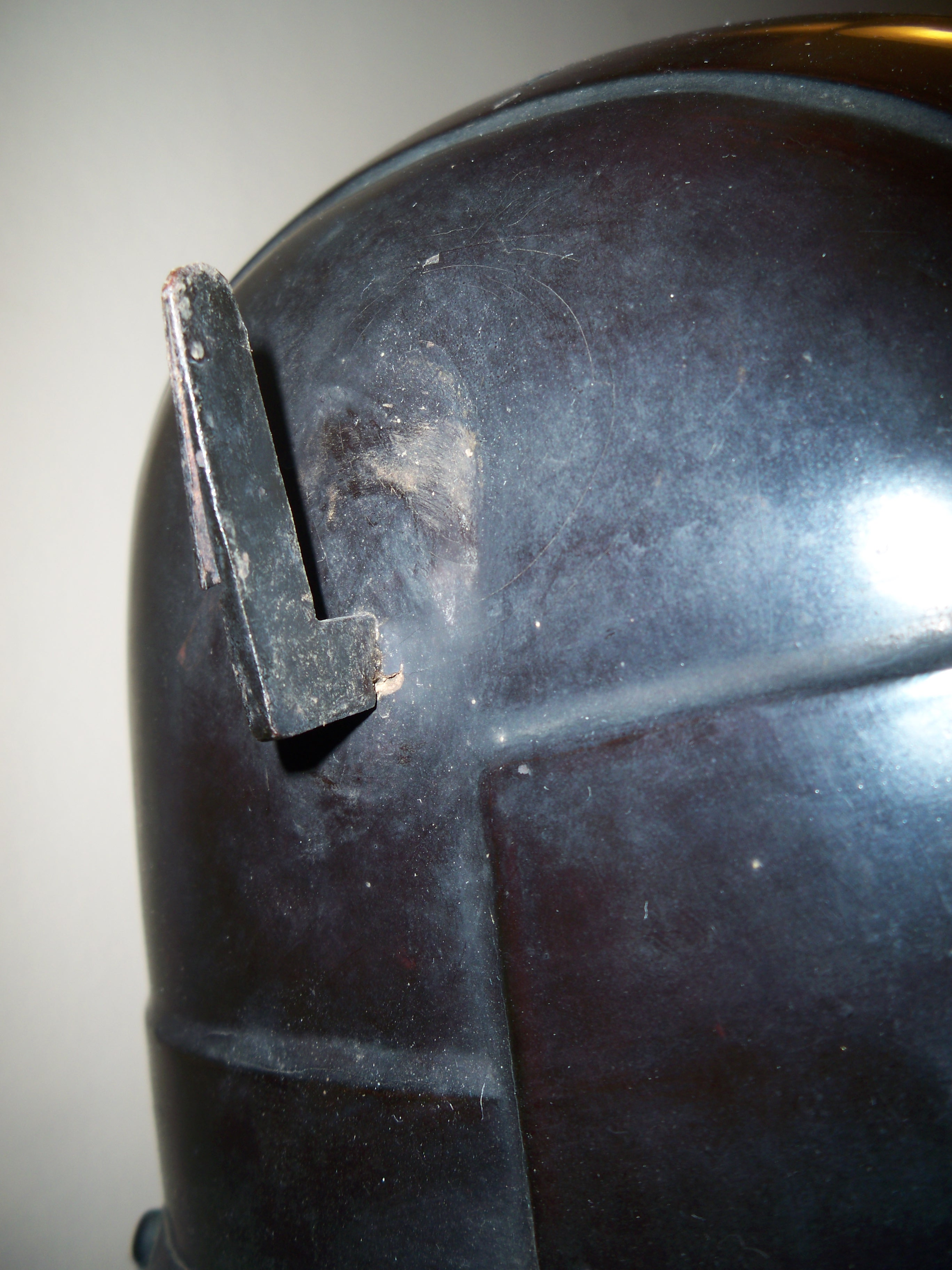
Wakidate tsunamoto (mounting point for side crest)

== Types of kabuto ==
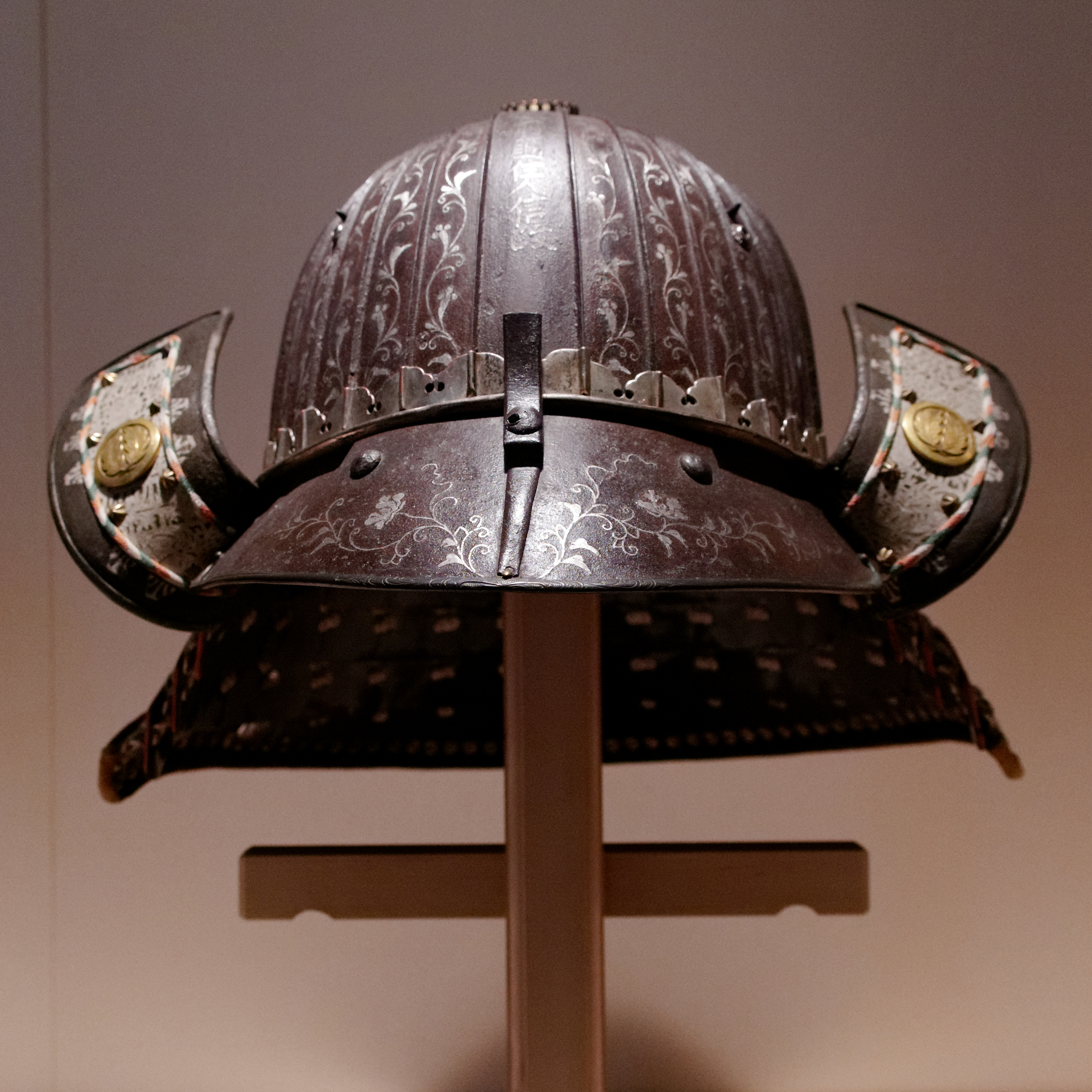
A suji bachi kabuto

=== Suji bachi kabuto ===
Suji bachi kabuto is a multiple-plate type of Japanese helmet with raised ridges or ribs showing where the helmet plates come together; the rivets may be filed flat or they may be left showing, as in the hoshi-bachi kabuto.

=== Hoshi-bachi kabuto ===
Hoshi-bachi kabuto (star helmet bowl) with protruding rivet heads, have large rivets (o-boshi), small rivets (ko-boshi) and a rivet with a chrysantemoid-shaped washer at its base (za-boshi). Hoshi-bachi kabuto could also be suji bachi kabuto if there were raised ribs or ridges showing where the helmet plates came together.

=== Hari bachi kabuto ===
Hari bachi kabuto is multiple-plate Japanese hachi with no ribs or ridges showing where the helmet plates come and the rivets are filed flush.

=== Zunari kabuto ===
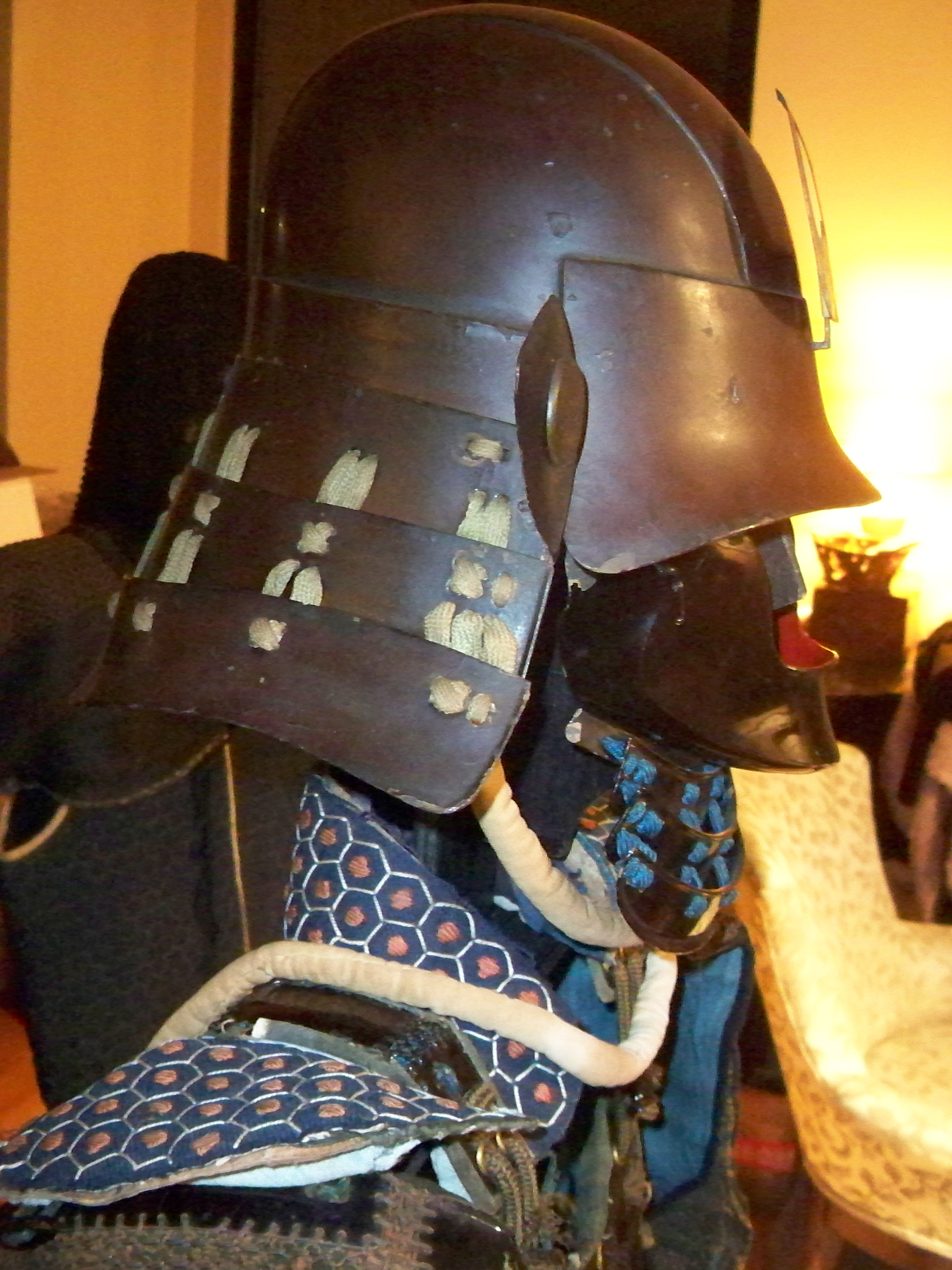
Edo period iron zunari kabuto

The zunari kabuto is a simple, five-plate design.

=== Tatami kabuto ===
A great number of simpler, lightweight, folding, portable armours for lower-ranking samurai and foot soldiers (ashigaru) were also produced. These were called tatami armour, and some featured collapsible tatami kabuto (also called choshin-kabuto), made from articulated lames. Tatami kabuto did not use rivets in their construction; instead, lacing or chain mail was used to connect the pieces to each other.

=== Kaji kabuto ===
Kaji kabuto were a type of helmet worn by samurai firemen.

=== Jingasa ===
Jingasa were war hats made in a variety of shapes, worn by ashigaru (foot soldiers) and samurai, which could be made from leather or metal.

=== Kawari kabuto, or strange helmet ===
During the Momoyama period of intense civil warfare, kabuto were made to a simpler design of three or four plates, lacking many of the ornamental features of earlier helmets. To offset the plain, utilitarian form of the new helmet, and to provide visibility and presence on the battlefield, armorers began to build fantastic shapes on top of the simple helmets in harikake (papier-mâché mixed with lacquer over a wooden armature), though some were constructed entirely of iron. These shapes mimicked forms from Japanese culture and mythology, including fish, cow horns, the head of the god of longevity, bolts of silk, head scarves, Ichi-no-Tani canyon, and axe heads, among many others. Some forms were realistically rendered, while others took on a very futuristic, modernist feel.

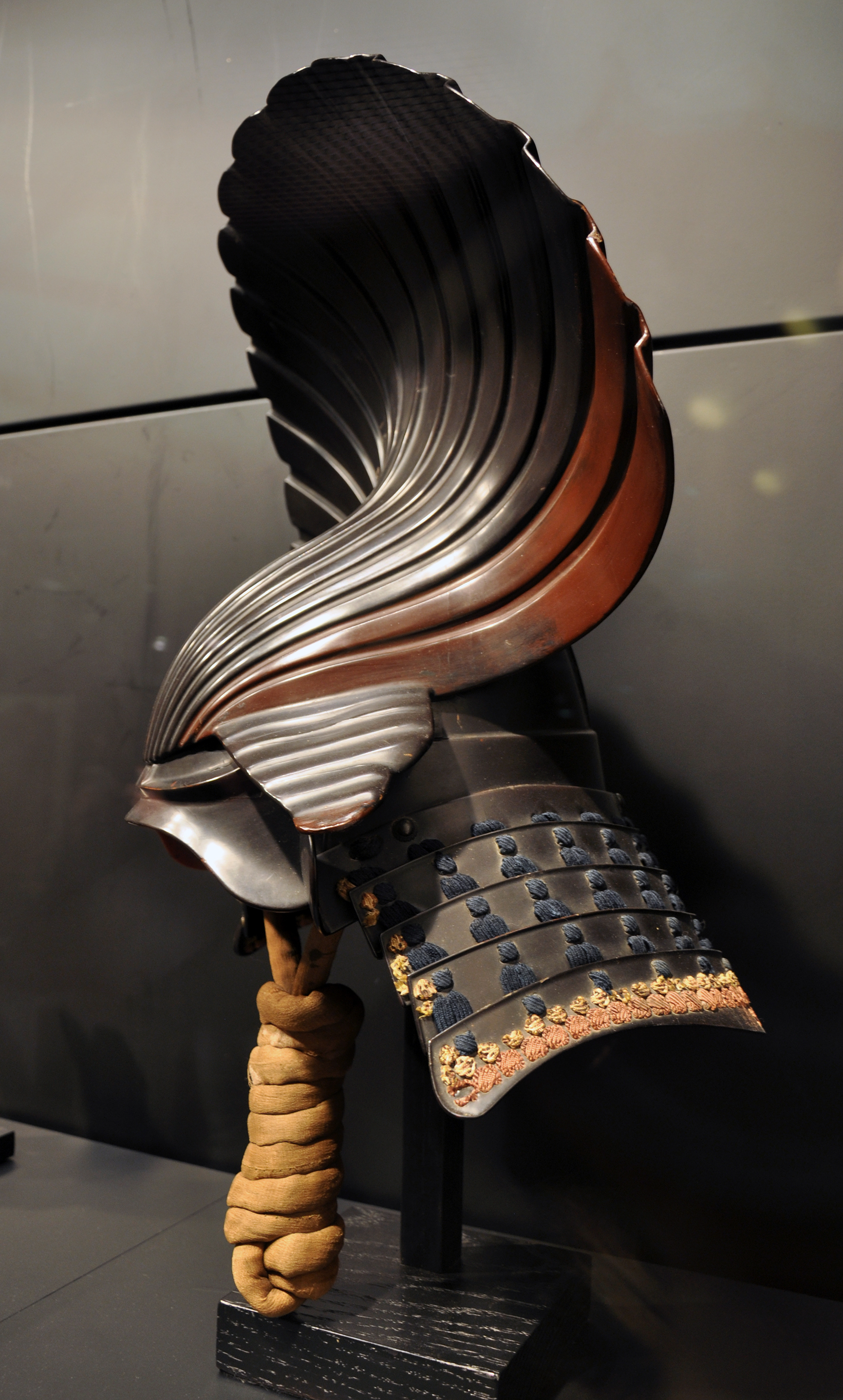
Harikake kabuto, a type of kawari kabuto which used papier-mâché mixed with lacquer for the elaborate decoration (the shell) on an iron bowl, beginning of the Edo Period, 17th century . Ann and Gabriel Barbier-Mueller Museum, Dallas (Texas)

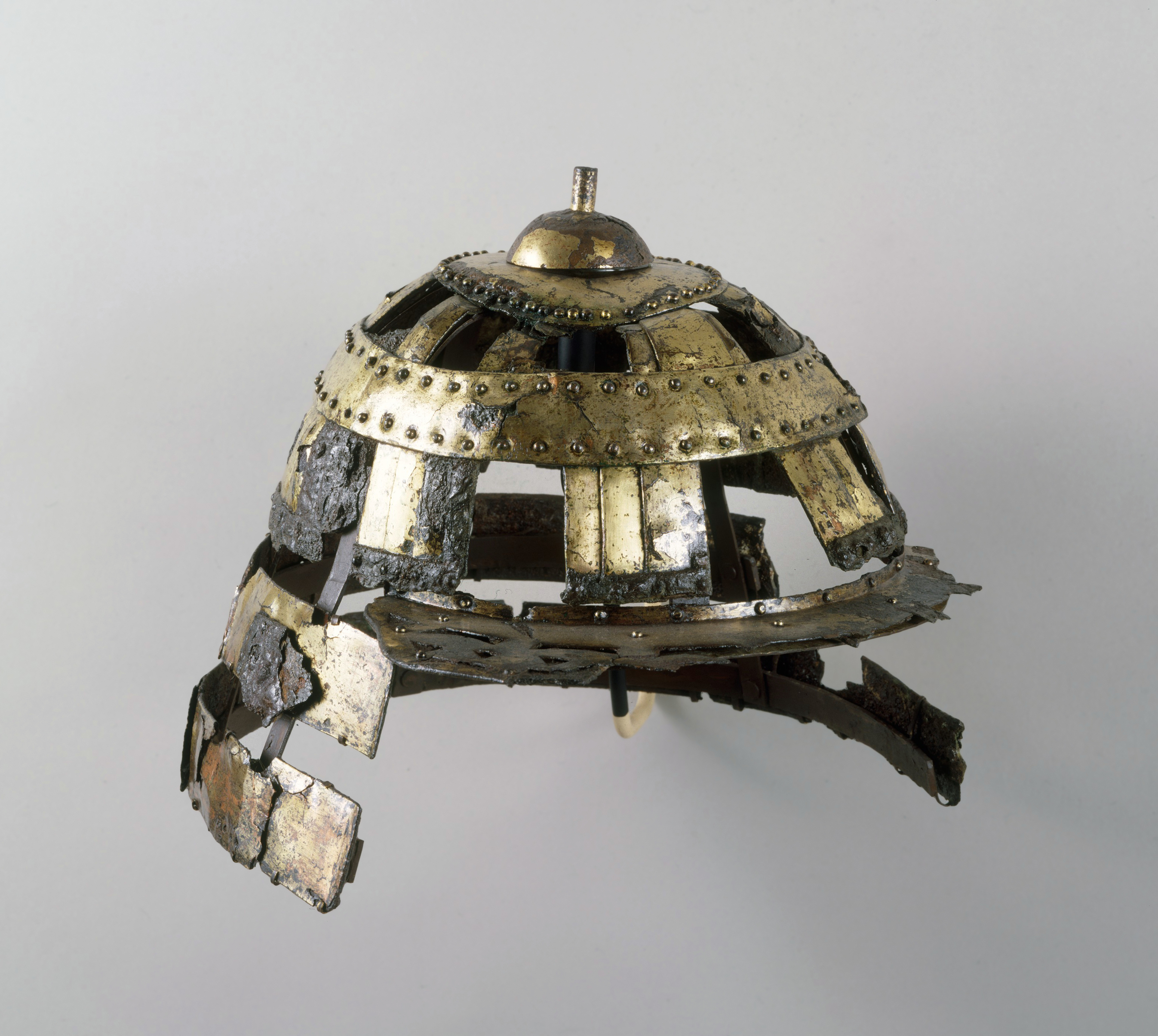
A Kofun period (fifth century) early kabuto made of iron and gilt copper, from Ise Province

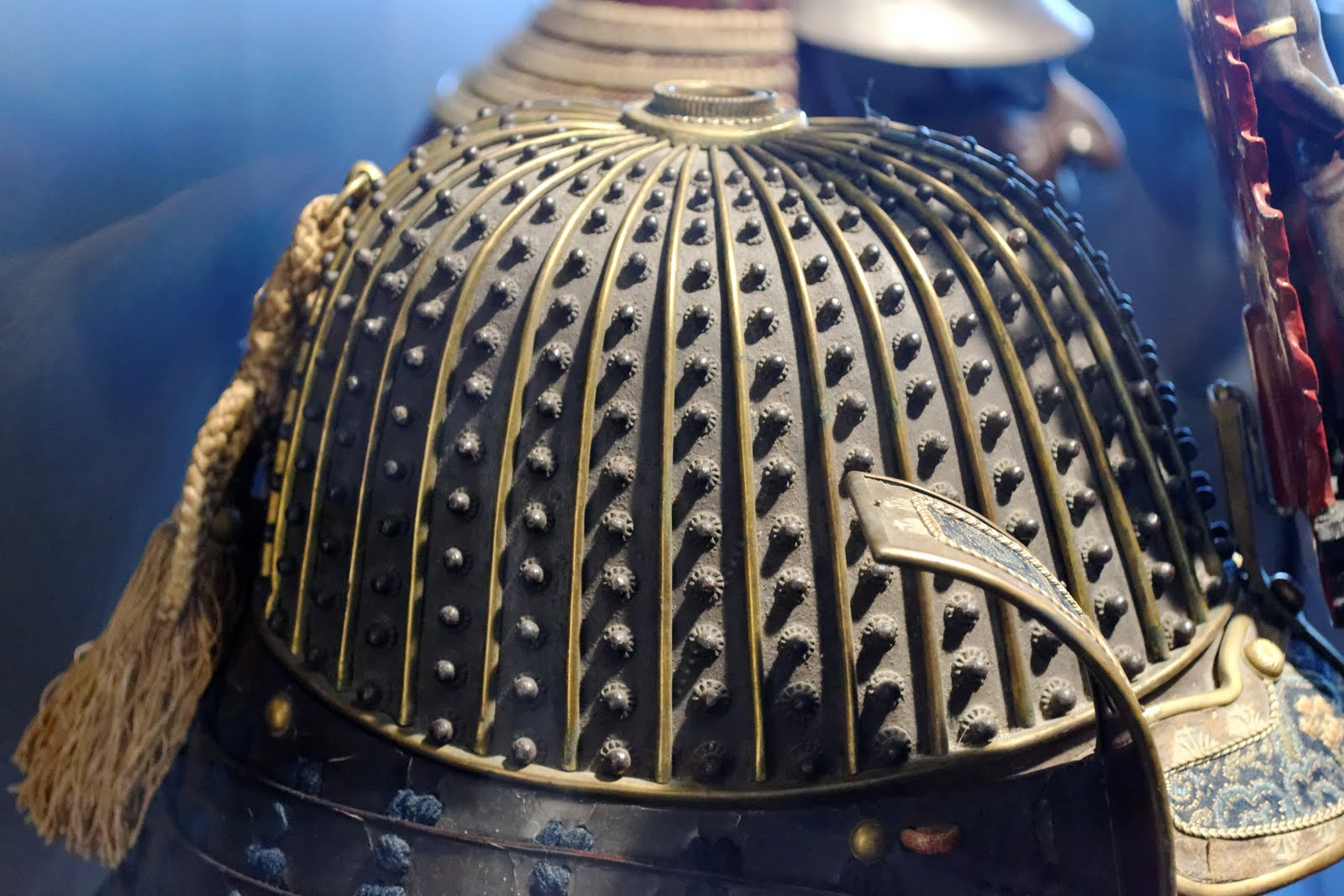
Za-boshi kabuto (chrysantemoid-shaped washer at the base of the rivet). This is also a suji bachi kabuto, as it has raised ridges.

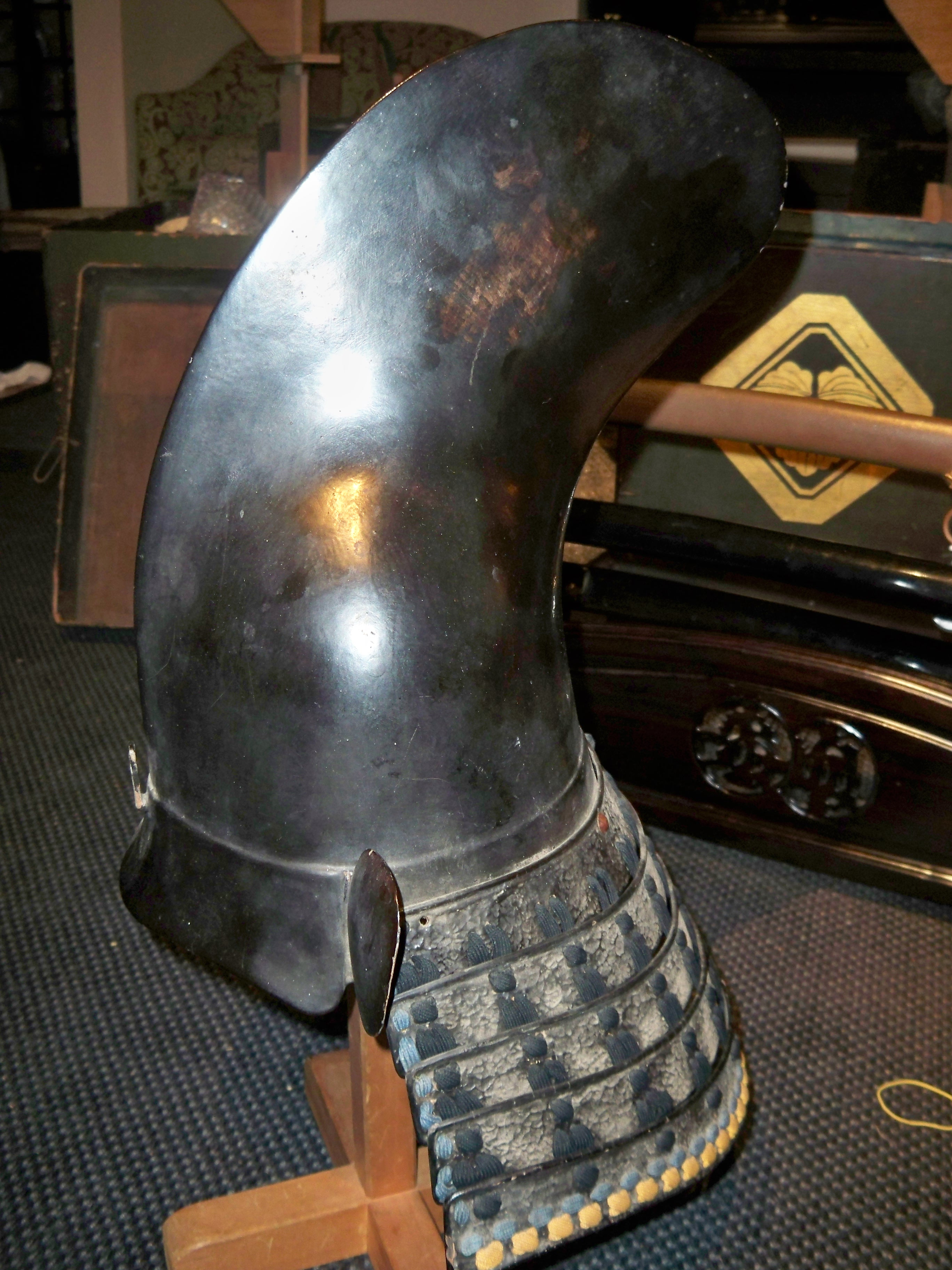
Eboshi kabuto

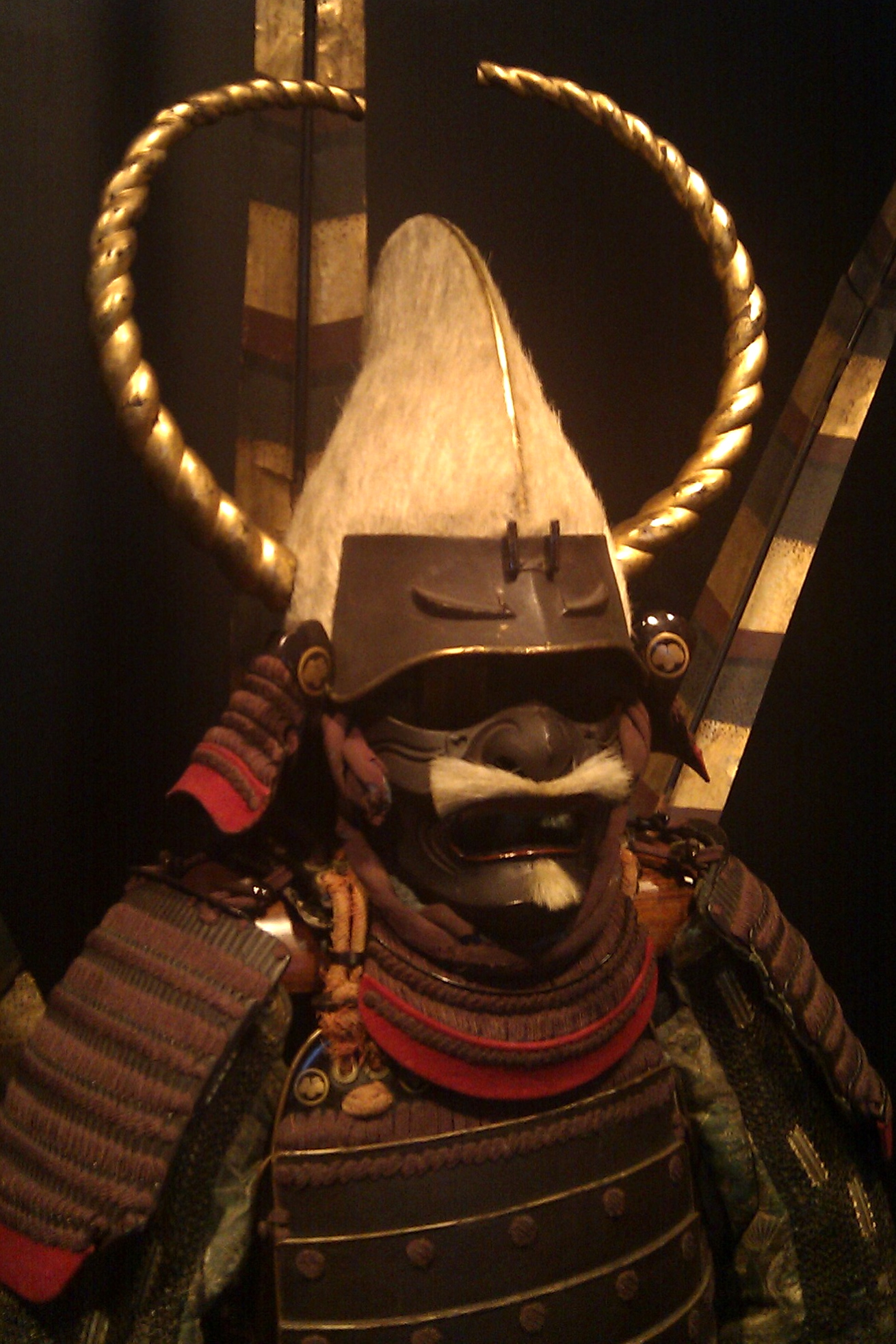
Eboshi kabuto

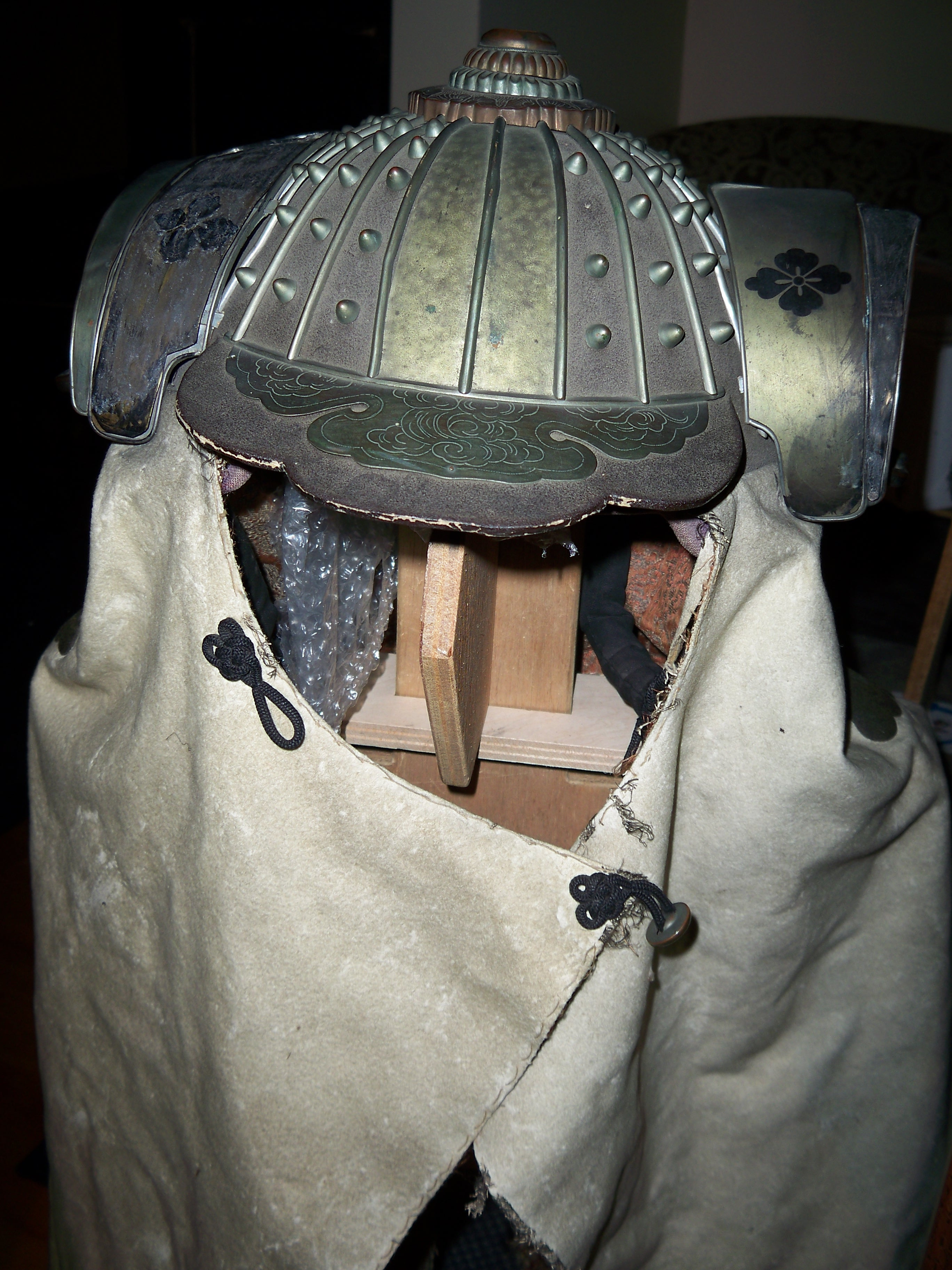
Kaji kabuto

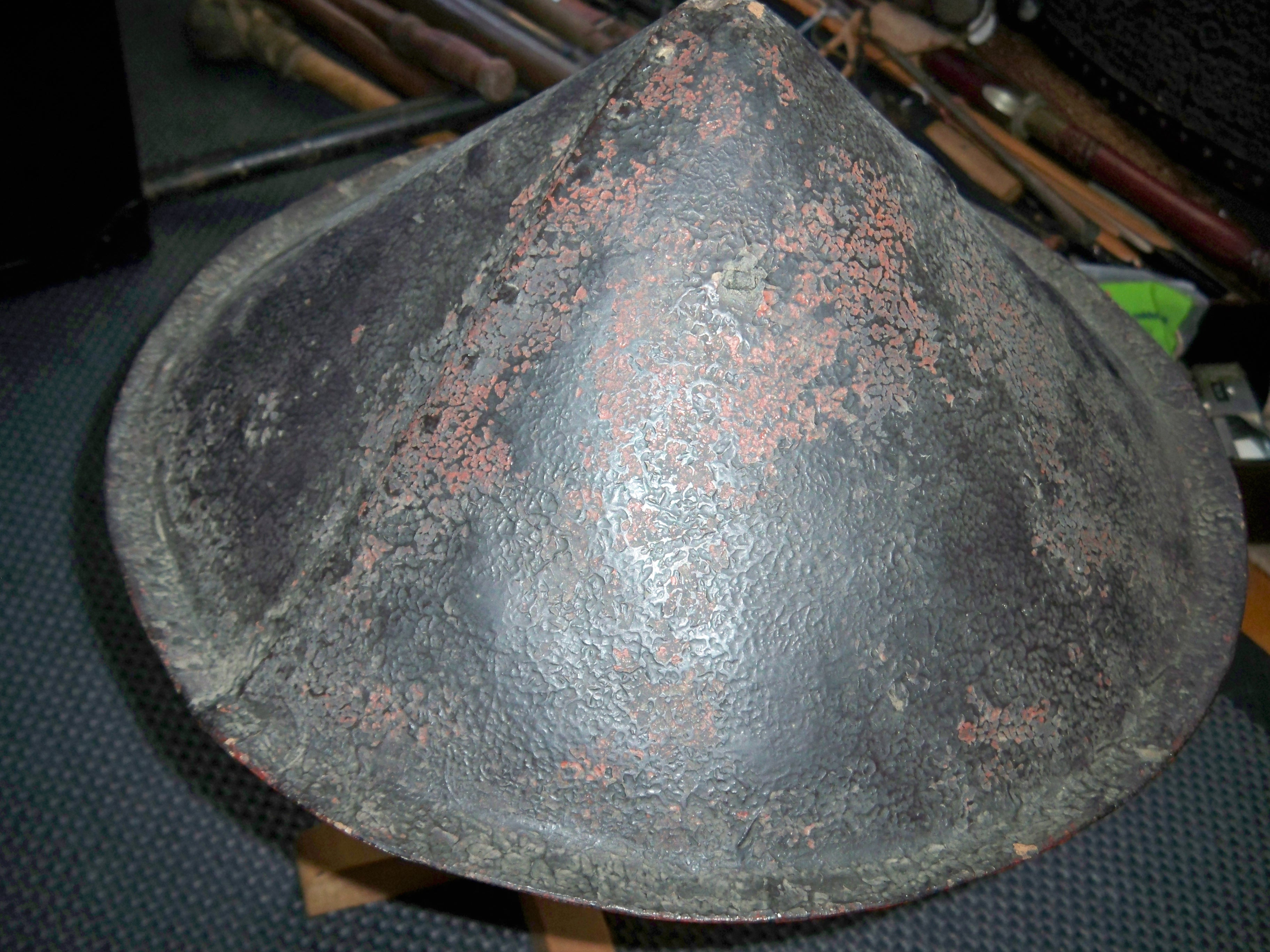
Jingasa, ashigaru type, constructed from hardened leather (nerigawa)

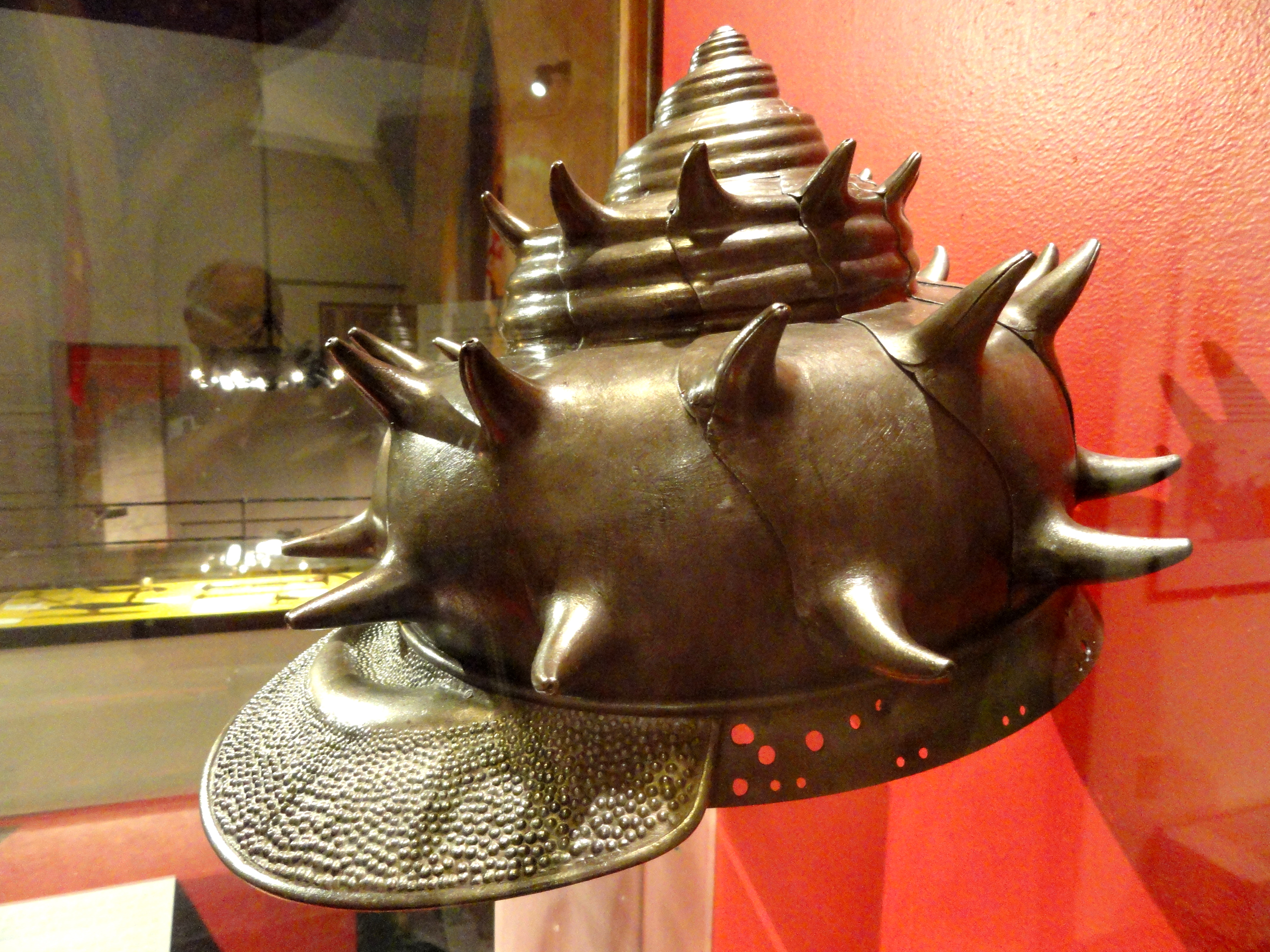
A kawari kabuto

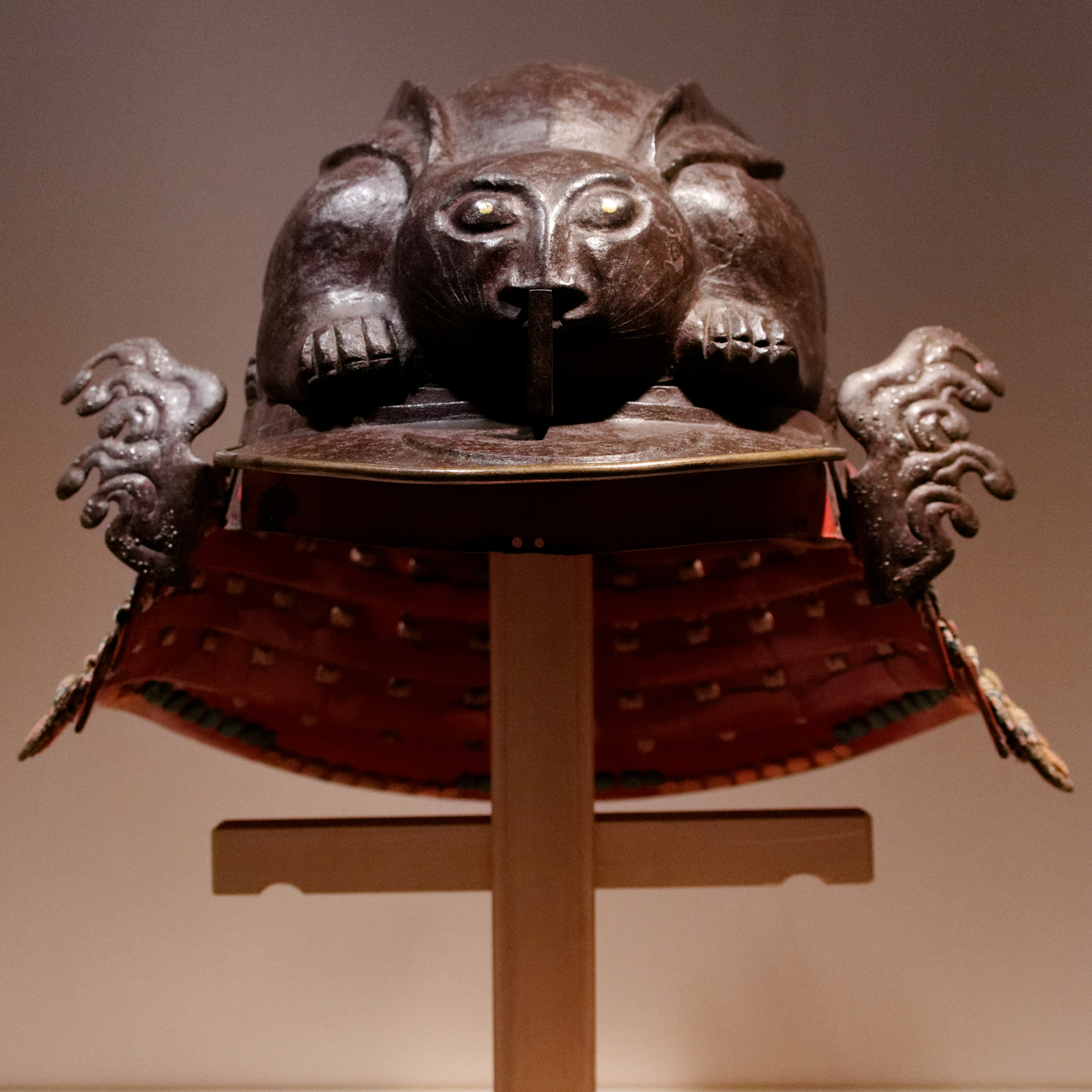
A kawari kabuto

== See also ==
- Zischägge, a similarly shaped European helmet
