= Chonmage =

Traditional Japanese men's hairstyle

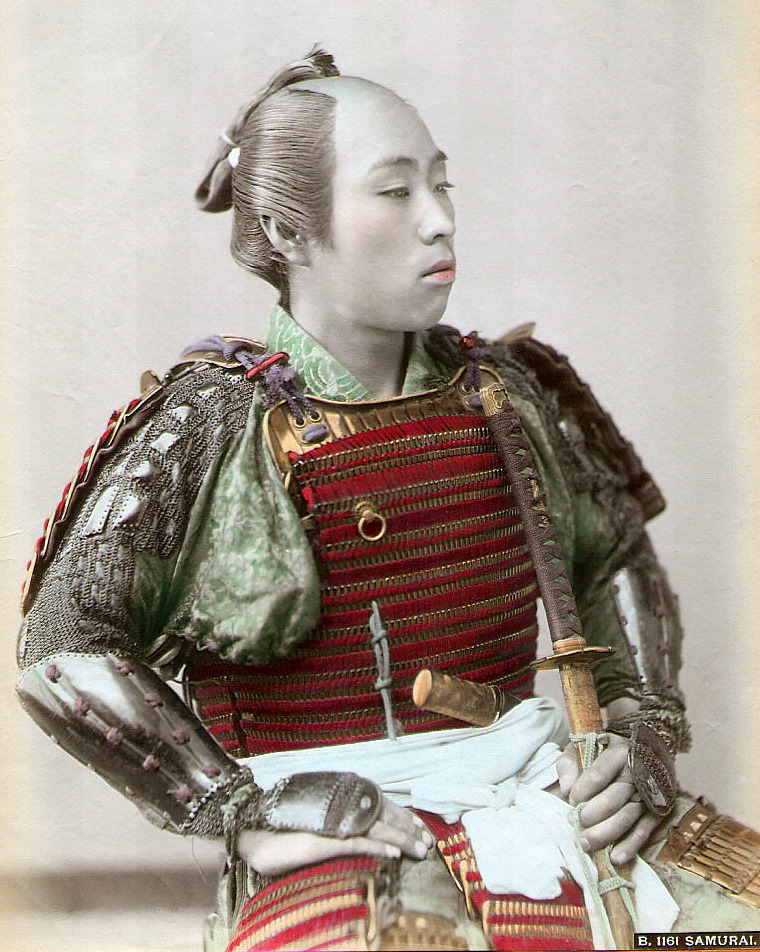
A 19th-century samurai with a chonmage

The chonmage (丁髷) is a type of traditional Japanese topknot haircut worn by men. It is most commonly associated with the Edo period (1603–1868) and samurai, and in recent times with sumo wrestlers. It was originally a method of using hair to hold a samurai kabuto helmet steady atop the head in battle, and became a status symbol among Japanese society.

In a traditional Edo-period chonmage, the top of the head is shaved. The remaining hair was oiled and waxed before being tied into a small tail folded onto the top of the head in the characteristic topknot.

== History ==
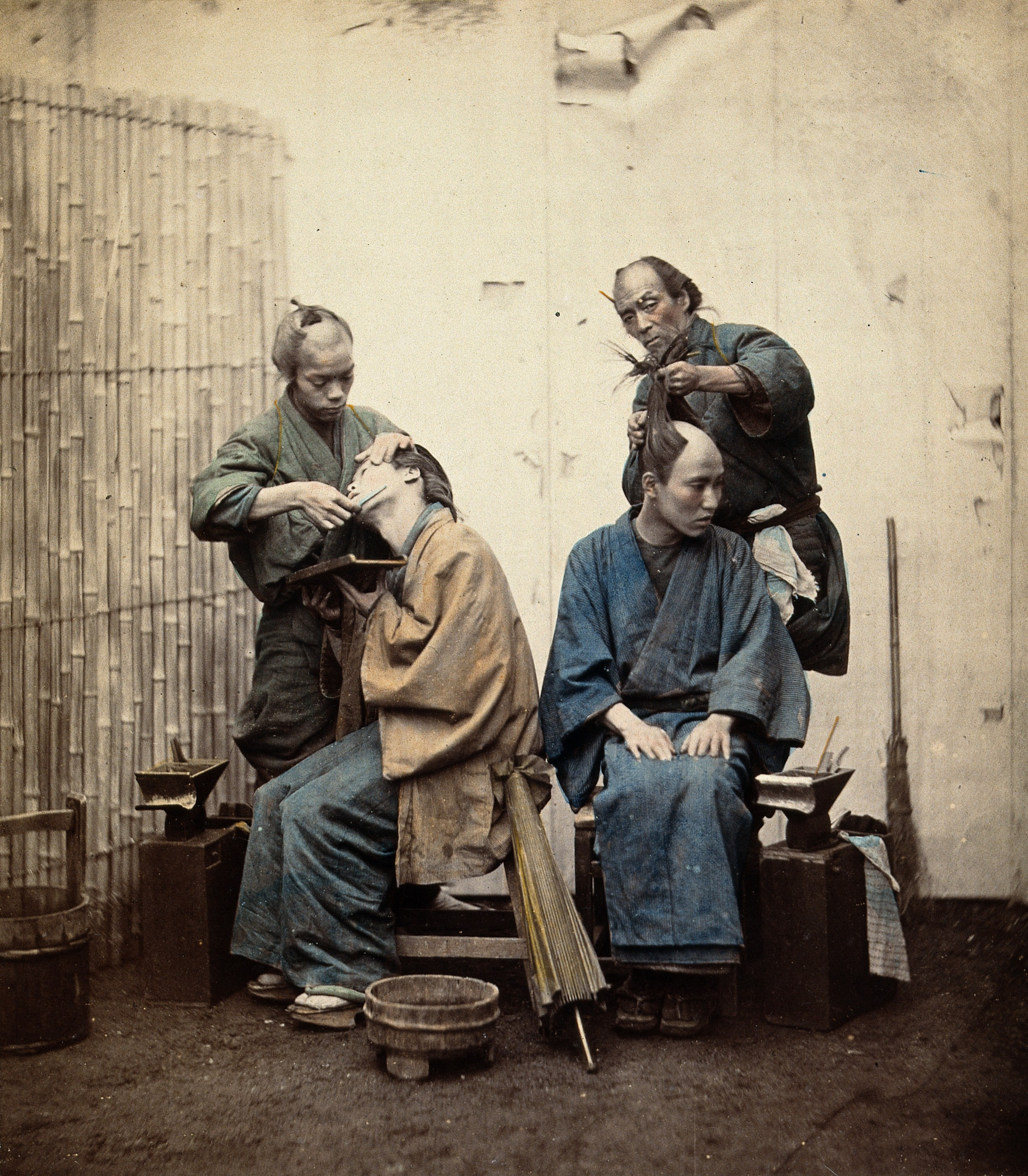
A Japanese barbershop in the 19th century

The origins of the chonmage can be traced back to the Heian period (794–1185). During this period, aristocrats wore special cap-like crowns as part of their official clothing. To secure the crown in place, the hair would be tied near the back of the head.

Between the 1580s (towards the end of the Warring States period, 1467–1615) and the 1630s (the beginning of the Edo period, 1603–1867), Japanese cultural attitudes to men's hair shifted; where a full head of hair and a beard had been valued as a sign of manliness in the preceding era of strife, in the ensuing period of peace, this gradually shifted until a beard and an unshaven pate were viewed as barbaric, and incongruent with the peaceful times that followed roughly 200 years of civil war. This change was also enforced during the Japanese invasion of Joseon (1592–1598), where some Japanese commanders forced the submitted Koreans to shave their heads to this hairstyle, as a method of converting their identities to that of Japanese.

A shaven pate (the sakayaki) became required of the samurai classes by the early Edo period, and by the 1660s, all men, commoner or samurai, were forbidden from wearing beards, with the sakayaki deemed mandatory. The style of the chonmage ("topknot") was dependent on the social status of the wearer, with that of the samurai being more pronounced than artisans or merchants. Ronin, samurai who did not serve a Lord, were not required to shave their heads. This became an easy way to identify such men.

Under the Meiji Restoration, the practices of the samurai classes, deemed unsuitable for a Westernised nation, resulted in a number of edicts intended to 'modernise' the appearance of upper class Japanese men. With the Dampatsurei Edict of 1871 issued in the name of Emperor Meiji during the early Meiji Era, men of the samurai classes were forced to cut their hair short, effectively abandoning the chonmage.

== Sumo ==
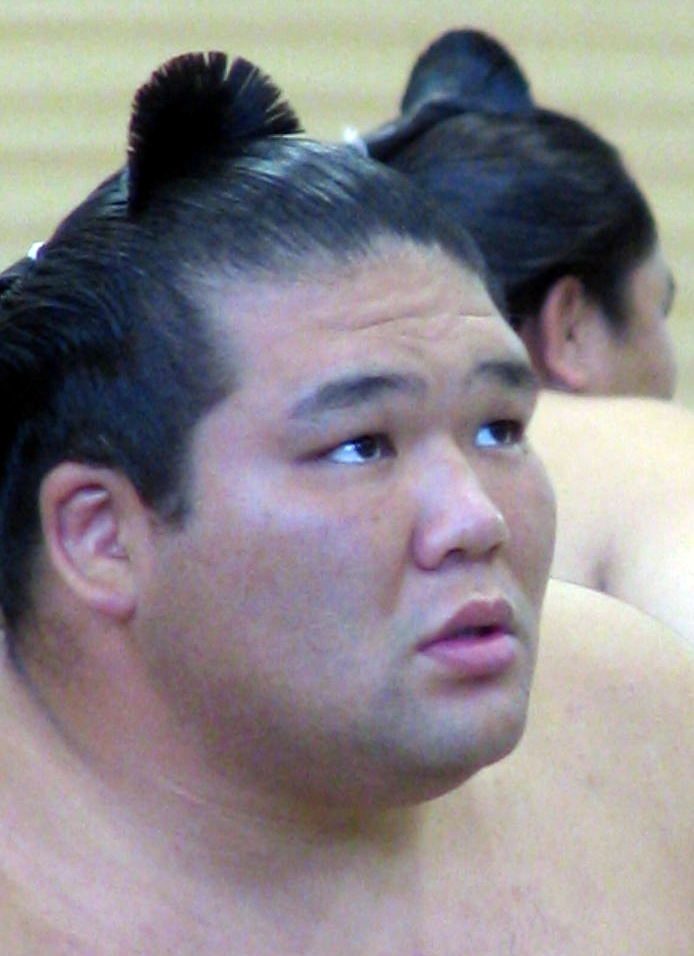
Modern sumo wrestler Tochiazuma with an ōichō-style chonmage

In modern Japan, the only remaining wearers of the chonmage are sumo wrestlers and kabuki actors. Given the uniqueness of the style in modern times, the Japan Sumo Association employs specialist hairdressers called tokoyama to cut and prepare sumo wrestlers' hair.

The sumo style of the chonmage is slightly different, in that the pate is no longer shaved. However, the hair may be thinned in this region or the crown of the head shaved, called nakazori, to allow the topknot to sit more neatly. This is done around once every three months.

All professional sumo wrestlers wear a chonmage as soon as their hair is long enough to do so. Sumo wrestlers with sekitori status are required on certain occasions, such as during a honbasho, to wear their hair in a more elaborate form of topknot called an ōichō (大銀杏), where the end of the topknot is splayed out to form a semicircle, resembling a ginkgo leaf.

The chonmage is of such symbolic importance in sumo that snipping it off is the centerpiece of a wrestler's retirement ceremony. Dignitaries and other important people in a wrestler's life are invited to take one snip, with the final one taken by his trainer. For most wrestlers who never reached a sekitori rank, his retirement ceremony will be the only time he wears the more elaborate ōichōmage.

== See also ==
- List of hairstyles
- Ji or touji, the traditional Chinese topknot
- Oseledets
- Queue, the Qing-dynasty Chinese hairstyle also involving a shaved pate
- Sikha
