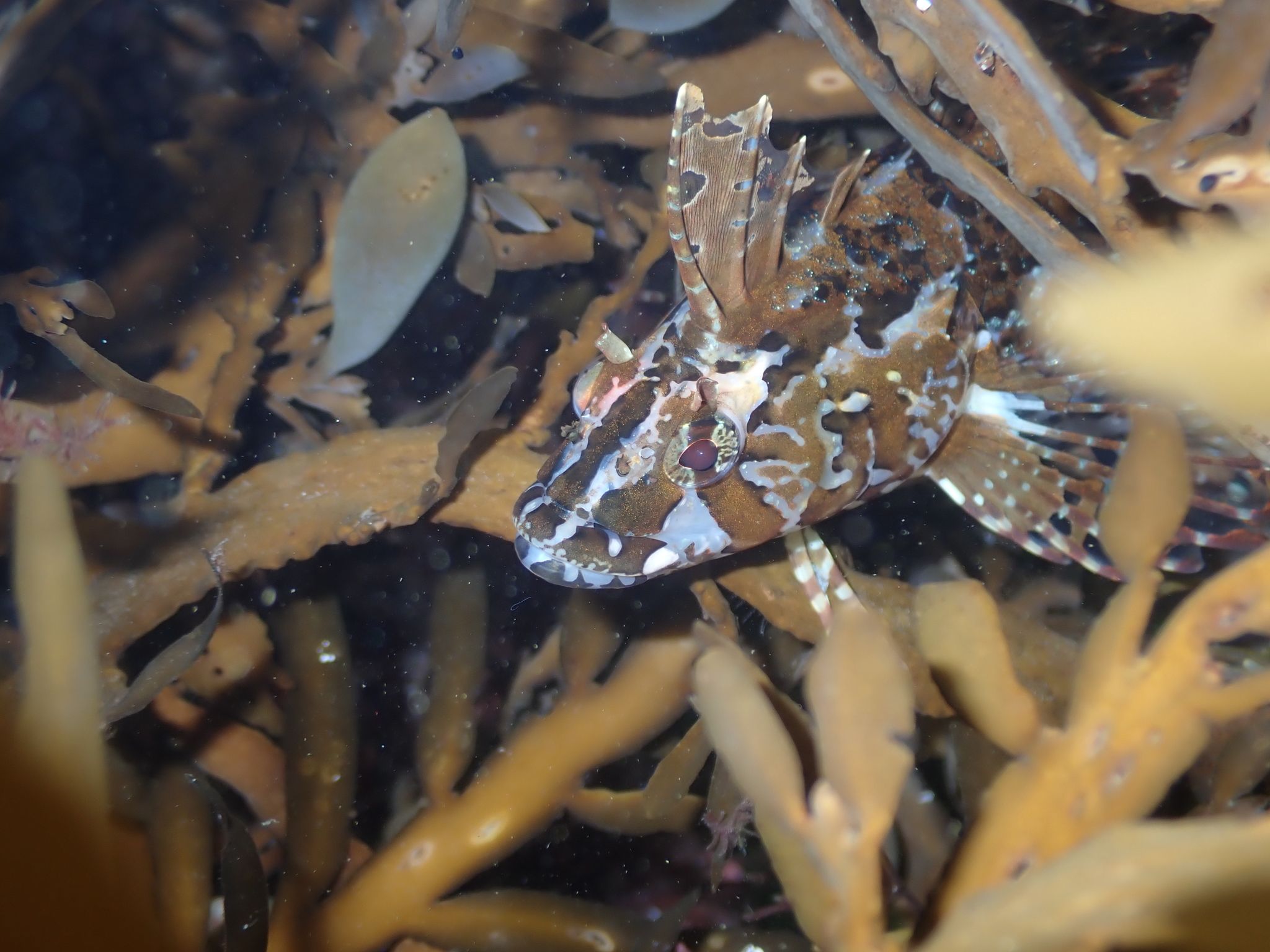
- Notoclinus fenestratus in Island Bay, Wellington

Conservation status
- Least Concern (IUCN 3.1)

Scientific classification
- Kingdom: Animalia
- Phylum: Chordata
- Class: Actinopterygii
- Division: Teleostei
- Order: Blenniiformes
- Family: Tripterygiidae
- Genus: Notoclinus
- Species: N. fenestratus

Binomial name
- Notoclinus fenestratus (Forster, 1801)

Synonyms
- Blennius fenestratus Forster, 1801; Auchenopterus fenestratus (Forster, 1801); Tripterygion fenestratum (Forster, 1801); Tripterygium fenestratum (Forster, 1801)

= New Zealand topknot =

Species of fish

The New Zealand topknot (Notoclinus fenestratus) is a triplefin of the genus Notoclinus, found around the North Island of New Zealand in reef areas of broken rock and brown seaweed.
