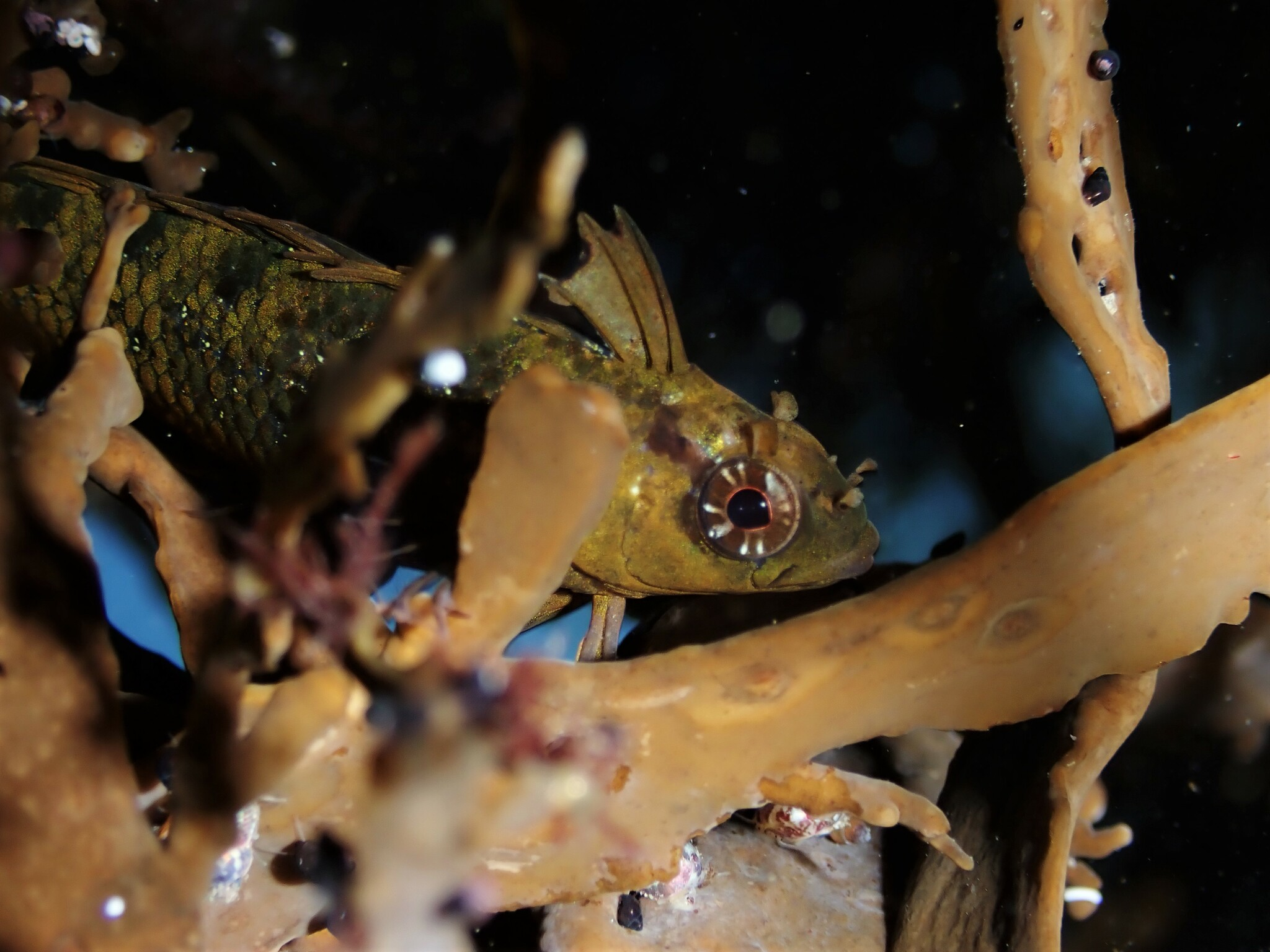

Conservation status
- Least Concern (IUCN 3.1)

Scientific classification
- Kingdom: Animalia
- Phylum: Chordata
- Class: Actinopterygii
- Order: Blenniiformes
- Family: Tripterygiidae
- Genus: Notoclinus
- Species: N. compressus

Binomial name
- Notoclinus compressus (Hutton, 1872)

Synonyms
- Tripterygium compressum Hutton, 1872; Auchenopterus compressus (Hutton, 1872)

= Brown topknot =

Species of fish

The brown topknot (Notoclinus compressus) is a triplefin of the family Tripterygiidae, endemic to New Zealand in rock pools and from low water to depths of about 5 m, in reef areas of broken rock and large brown seaweed of genera Carpophyllum and Cystophora. Its length is up to about 8.5 cm.

== Size ==
Max length : 8.5 cm

== Environment and climate ==
The brown topknot lives in marine demersal at a depth range of around 5 meters and in Temperate climate.

== Distribution ==
This brown topknot species is found in the Southwest Pacific in New Zealand and is usually living in large brown algae.
