= Helcogramma ishigakiensis =

Scientific classification
- Kingdom: Animalia
- Phylum: Chordata
- Class: Actinopterygii
- Order: Blenniiformes
- Family: Tripterygiidae
- Genus: Helcogramma
- Species: H. ishigakiensis

Binomial name
- Helcogramma ishigakiensis Aoyagi, 1954

Species of fish

Helcogramma ishigakiensis is a species of triplefin which is endemic to the Ryukyu Islands of southern Japan. It was described by Aoyagi in 1954 as Lepidoblennius marmoratus ishigakiensis. It was synonymised with Helcogramma inclinata by Ronald Fricke in 1997 but its status as a valid species was reasserted by Satokuni Tashiro in 2014. It is not included in FishBase but is in the Catalog of Fishes.
