= Helcogramma shinglensis =

Scientific classification
- Domain: Eukaryota
- Kingdom: Animalia
- Phylum: Chordata
- Class: Actinopterygii
- Order: Blenniiformes
- Family: Tripterygiidae
- Genus: Helcogramma
- Species: H. shinglensis

Binomial name
- Helcogramma shinglensis Lal Mohan, 1971

Species of fish

Helcogramma shinglensis is a species of triplefin from the genus Helcogramma. It has been recorded only from the Gulf of Mannar in the eastern Indian Ocean. It is accepted as a valid species by Fishbase but the Catalog of Fishes treats this taxon as synonymous with Helcogramma obtusirostris.
