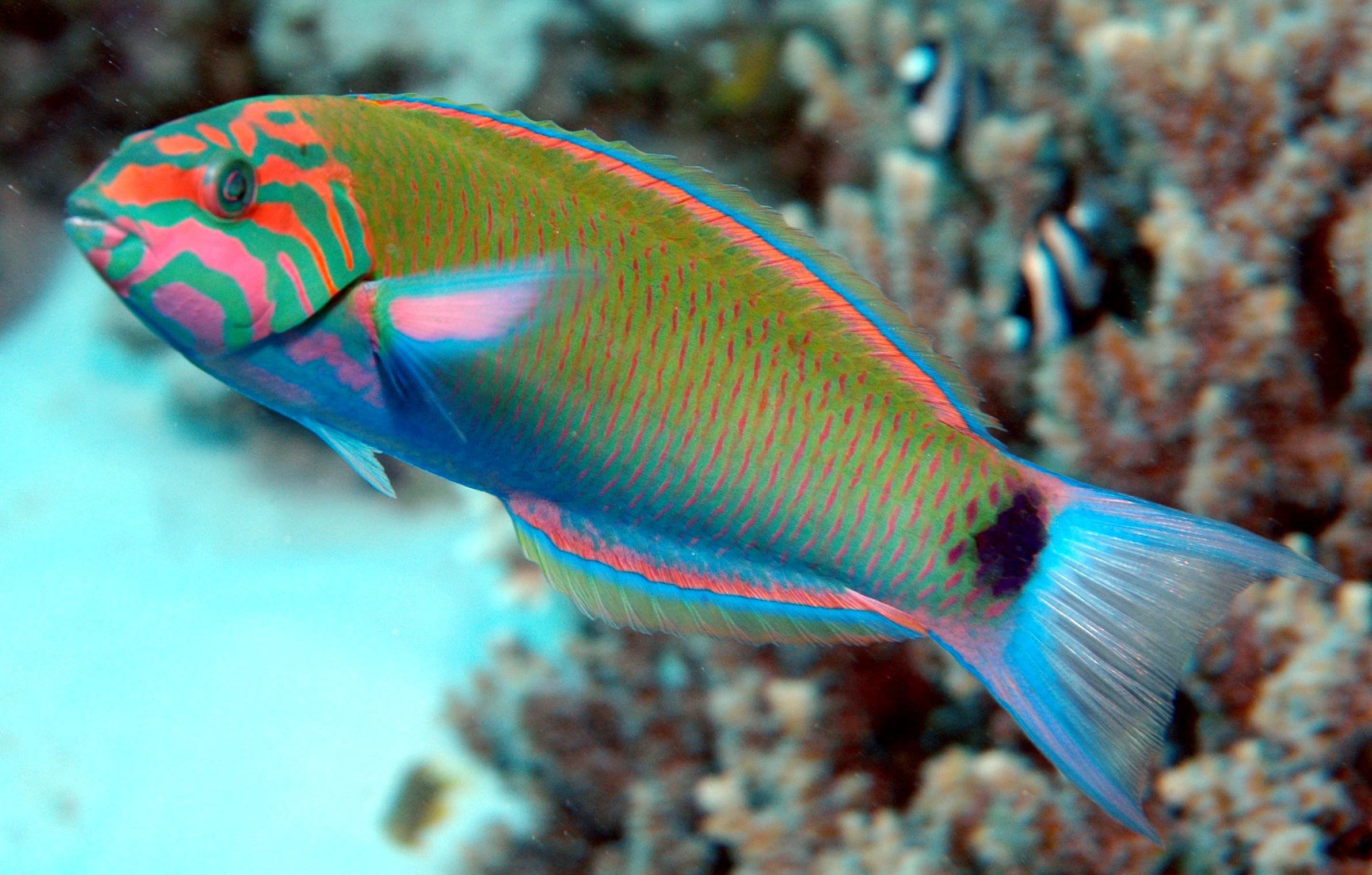

Conservation status
- Least Concern (IUCN 3.1)

Scientific classification
- Kingdom: Animalia
- Phylum: Chordata
- Class: Actinopterygii
- Order: Labriformes
- Family: Labridae
- Genus: Thalassoma
- Species: T. lunare

Binomial name
- Thalassoma lunare (Linnaeus, 1758)

Synonyms
- Labrus lunaris Linnaeus, 1758

= Moon wrasse =

Species of fish

The moon wrasse (Thalassoma lunare) also known as the crescent wrasse or lyretail wrasse, is a species of wrasse native to the Indian Ocean and the western Pacific Ocean. It is an inhabitant of coral reefs and surrounding areas at depths from 1 to 20 m (3.3 to 65.6 ft). Moon wrasses are carnivorous and tend to prey on fish eggs and small sea-floor dwelling invertebrates. This species can reach 45 cm (18 in) in total length. It is of minor importance to local commercial fisheries and can also be found in the aquarium trade.

== Description ==
The juvenile is blue on the lower half of its body, with a black spot in the middle of the dorsal fin and a black blotch on the caudal fin base. As it matures, the spot turns into a yellow crescent, hence the name. The body is green, with prominently marked scales. Coloration of the head ranges from blue to magenta, with a broken checkerboard pattern.

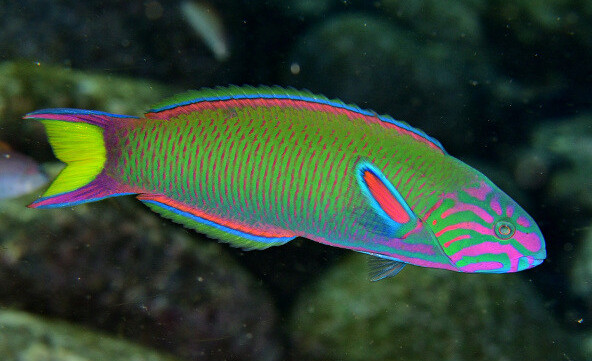
Adult

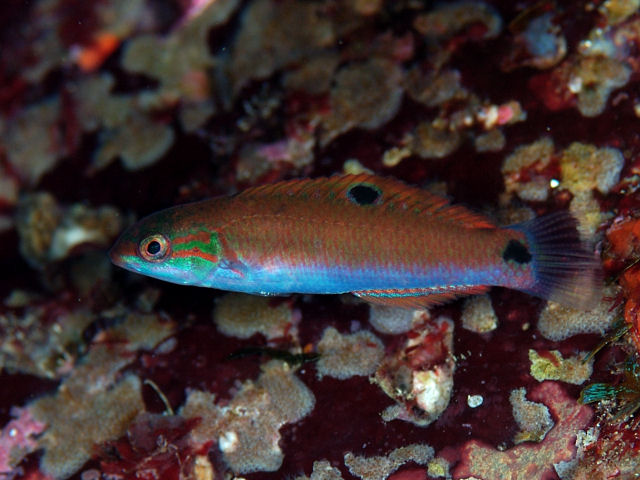
Juvenile

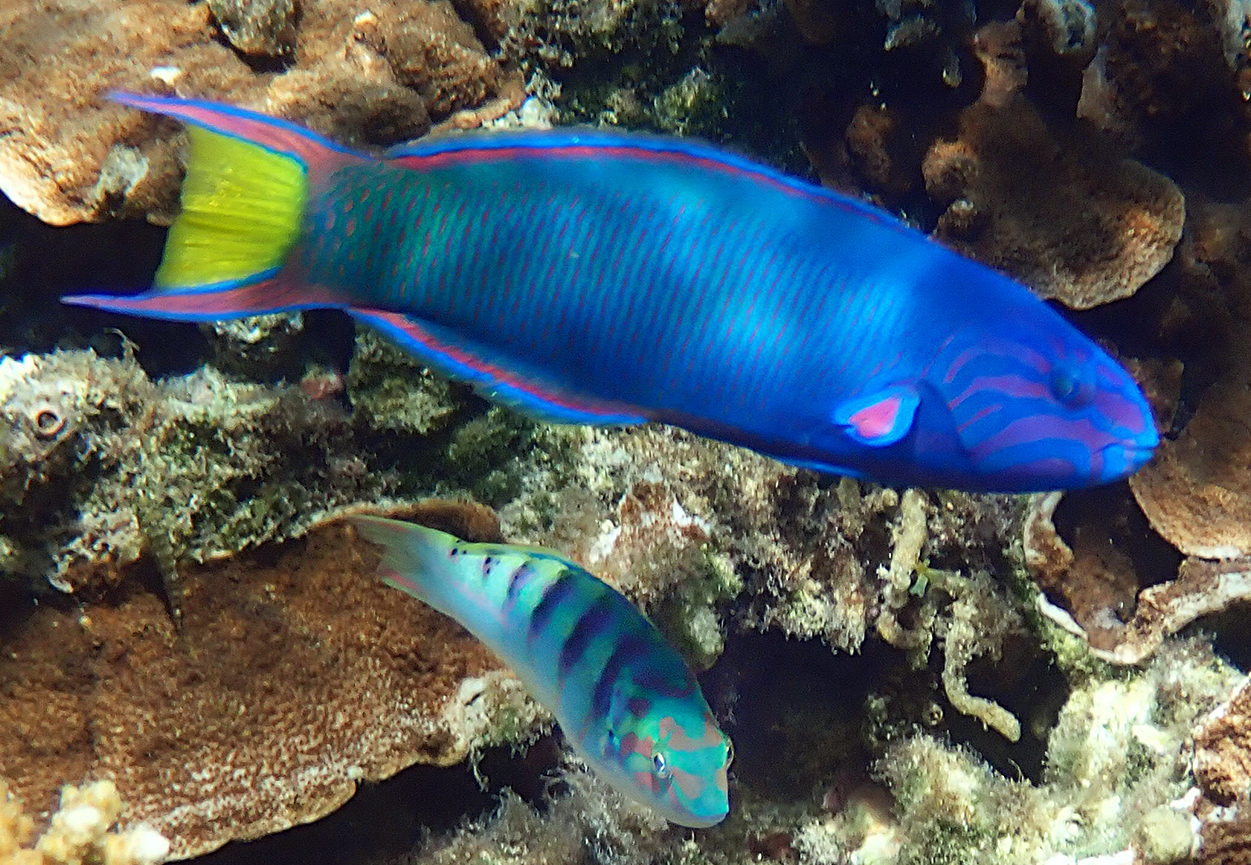
Blue coloured male.

== Biology ==
Moon wrasses are active fish, said to be moving all day long. They are also territorial, nipping, chasing, and otherwise harassing fish that get in their way.

Being diurnal, wrasses have strong vision, although they also have a decent sense of smell. At night, they rest in niches often under rocks or other such structures. If needed, a moon wrasse may dig out space under a rock by repeatedly swimming through it until it fits without struggle.

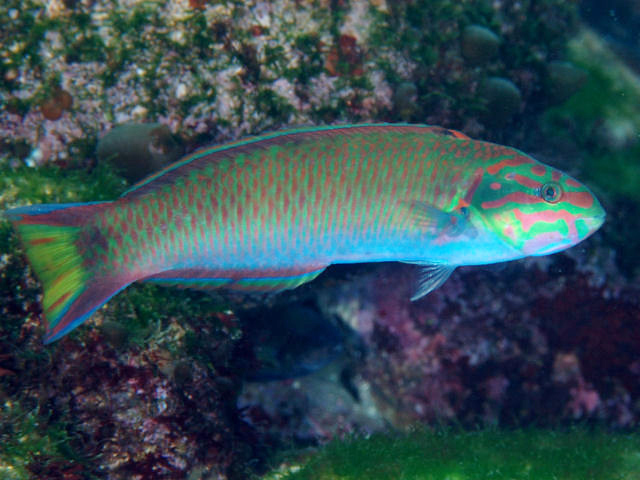
Hybrid (T. lunare x cupido). In Japan.

They are protogynous hermaphrodites, all starting off as females and changing to males, a process which, for the moon wrasse, takes only 10 days. Some moon wrasses live in groups consisted of a dominant male, and a "harem" of about a dozen other wrasses, some female and some male. The alpha male is more brightly colored, and at every low tide hour, changes from green to blue, and goes into a show of attacking and nipping all the other wrasses. During breeding season and before high tide, the alpha male turns completely blue, gathers up every single female, and the spawning frenzy begins.

== In the aquarium ==
Moon wrasses may live up to a decade in captivity, although this is shorter in the wild. They are popular fish in the aquarium trade, due to their hardiness, bright colors, and engaging behavior. They are renowned for their ability to tolerate spikes in nitrite, and eat bristle worms, which can be an aquarium pest.

== Gallery ==
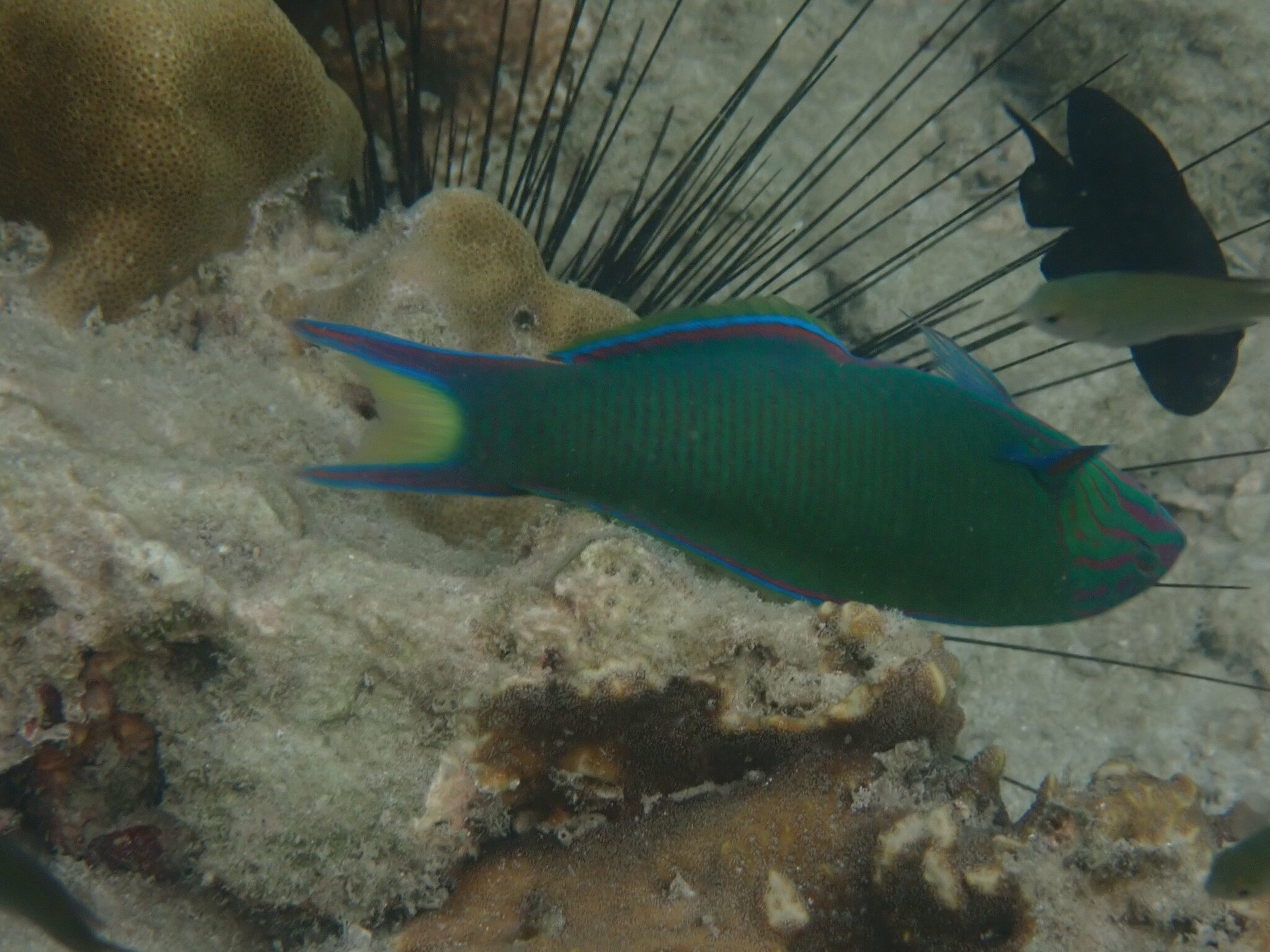
Swimming upside down

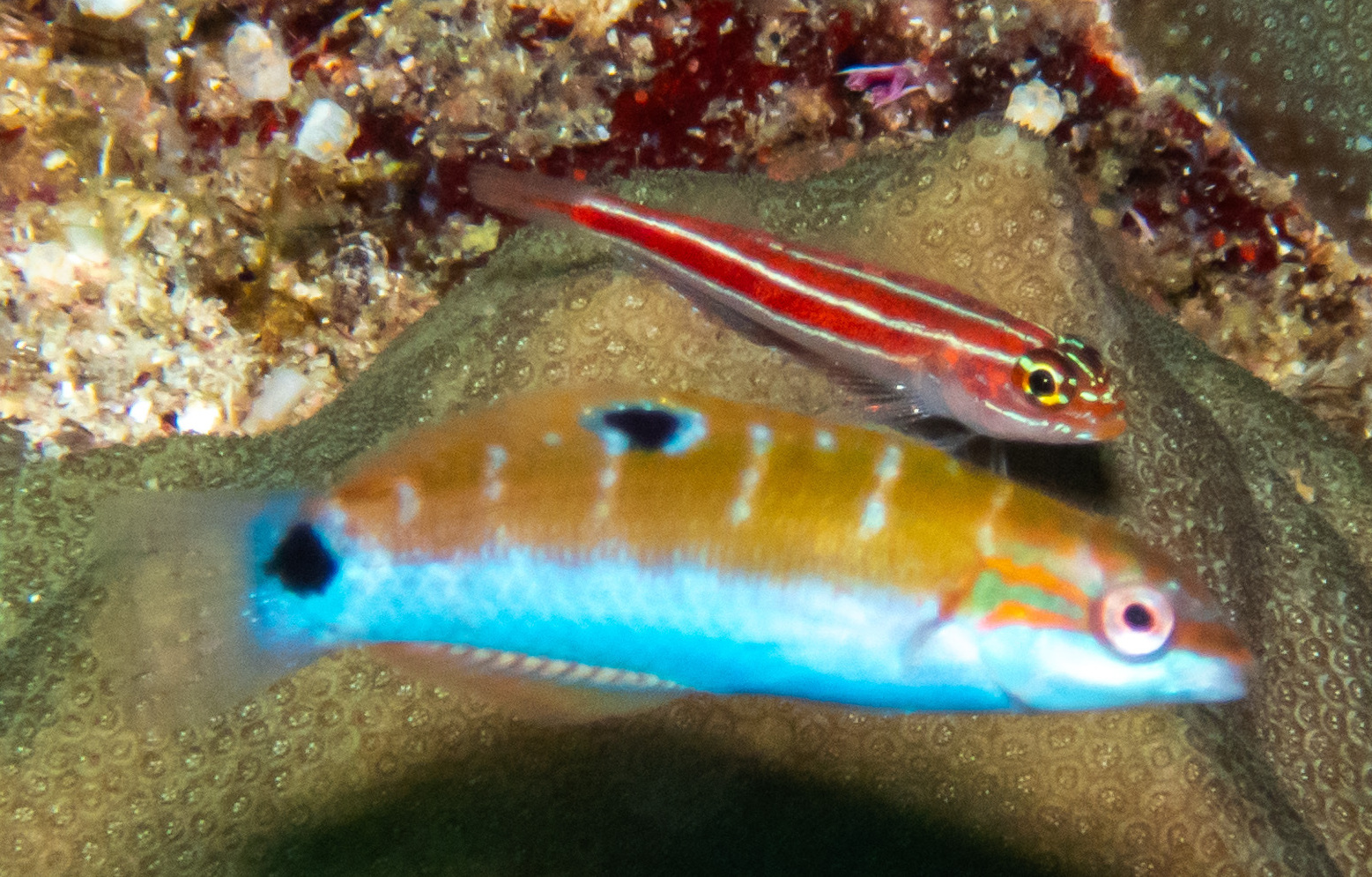
Juvenile compared to a striped triplefin

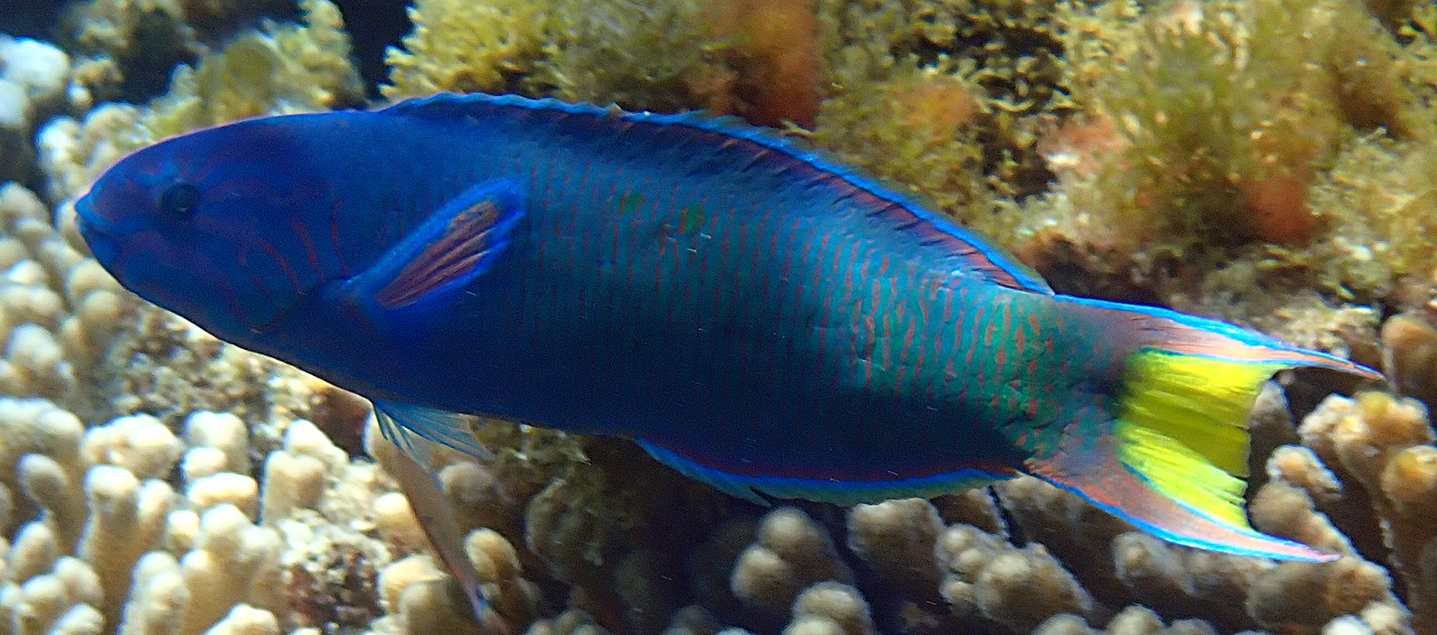
Blue coloured male

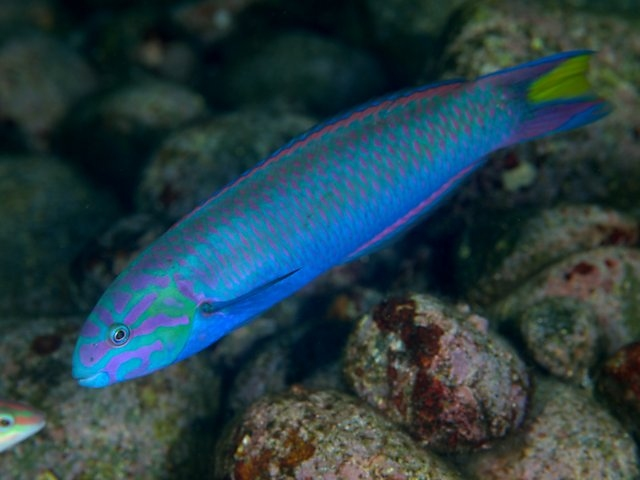
Blue coloured male hybrid (T. lunare x cupido)

== Bibliography ==
The New Encyclopedia of the Saltwater Aquarium, Greg Jennings, 2007. The Inspired Aquarium: Ideas and Instructions for Living with Aquariums, Senske, 2006. Under the seas, the Ecology of Australia's Rocky Reefs, Neil Andrew, 2000.
