= Helcogramma rharhabe =

Conservation status
- Least Concern (IUCN 3.1)

Scientific classification
- Kingdom: Animalia
- Phylum: Chordata
- Class: Actinopterygii
- Order: Blenniiformes
- Family: Tripterygiidae
- Genus: Helcogramma
- Species: H. rharhabe

Binomial name
- Helcogramma rharhabe Holleman, 2007

Species of fish

Helcogramma rharhabe is a species of triplefin blenny in the genus Helcogramma. It was described by Wouter Holleman in 2007, the specific name the Xhosa chief Rharhabe who broke away from his main tribe and formed his own grouping named after him, the Rharhabe. This species is found in the western Indian Ocean, along the south eastern coast of Africa from the Transkei to the Bazaruto Archipelago.
