= Solor triplefin =

Conservation status
- Data Deficient (IUCN 3.1)

Scientific classification
- Kingdom: Animalia
- Phylum: Chordata
- Class: Actinopterygii
- Order: Blenniiformes
- Family: Tripterygiidae
- Genus: Helcogramma
- Species: H. solorensis

Binomial name
- Helcogramma solorensis Fricke, 1997

Species of fish

Helcogramma solorensis, known commonly as the Solor triplefin, is a species of triplefin blenny in the genus Helcogramma. It was described by Fricke in 1997. It is endemic to Solor in East Nusa Tenggara, Indonesia.
