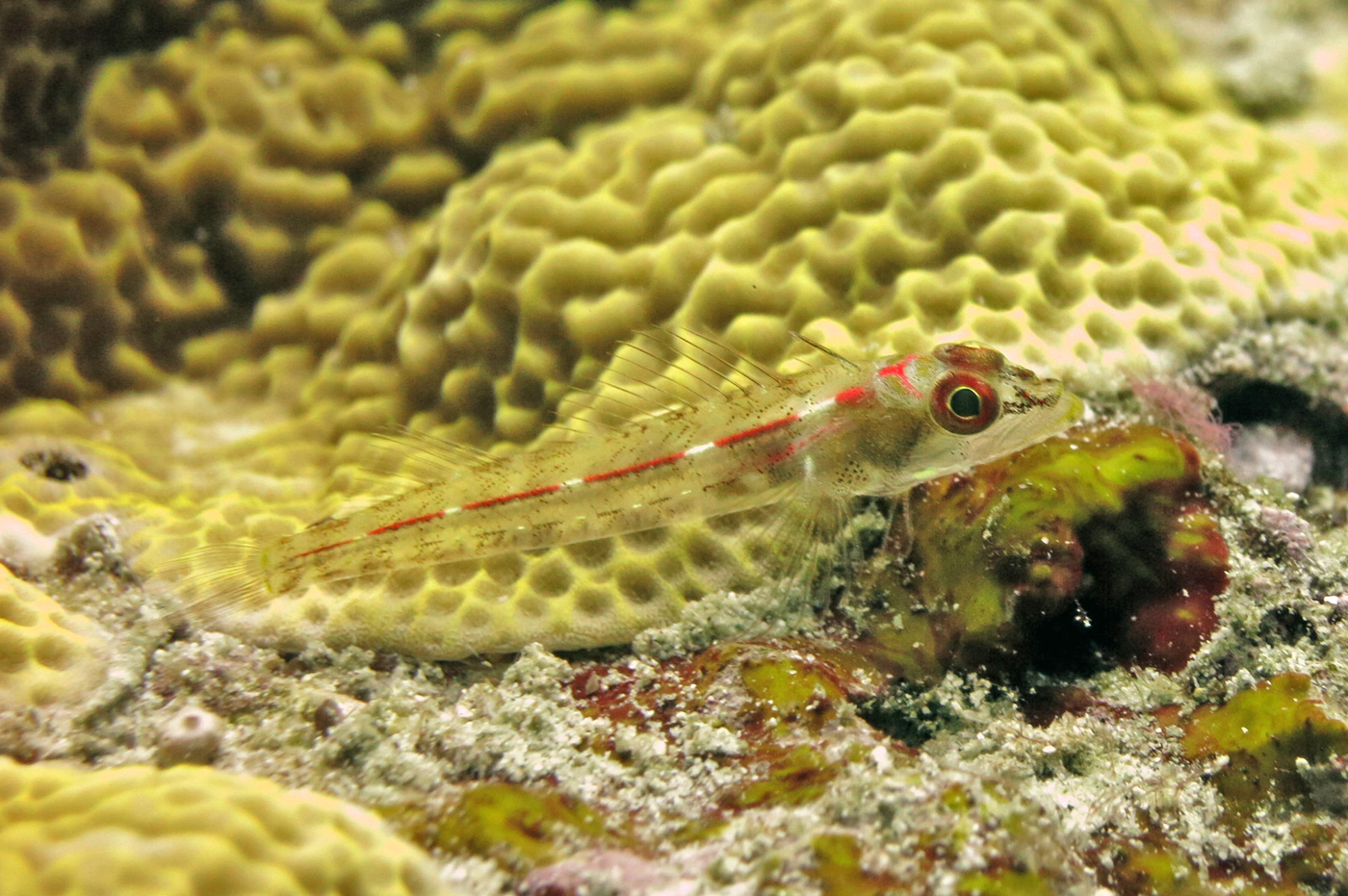

Conservation status
- Least Concern (IUCN 3.1)

Scientific classification
- Kingdom: Animalia
- Phylum: Chordata
- Class: Actinopterygii
- Order: Blenniiformes
- Family: Tripterygiidae
- Genus: Helcogramma
- Species: H. chica

Binomial name
- Helcogramma chica Rosenblatt, 1960

= Little hooded triplefin =

Species of fish

The little hooded triplefin (Helcogramma chica) is a species of triplefin blenny in the genus Helcogramma. It was described by Richard Rosenblatt in 1960. This species is found in the Indo-Pacific from the Cocos (Keeling) Islands to the Society Islands in French Polynesia.
