= Helcogramma rosea =

Conservation status
- Least Concern (IUCN 3.1)

Scientific classification
- Kingdom: Animalia
- Phylum: Chordata
- Class: Actinopterygii
- Order: Blenniiformes
- Family: Tripterygiidae
- Genus: Helcogramma
- Species: H. rosea

Binomial name
- Helcogramma rosea Holleman, 2006

Species of fish

Helcogramma rosea, the rosy triplefin, is a species of triplefin blenny in the genus Helcogramma. It was described by Wouter Holleman in 2006. This species occurs in the eastern Indian Ocean around Sri Lanka and in the Andaman Sea.
