= Helcogramma nigra =

Conservation status
- Least Concern (IUCN 3.1)

Scientific classification
- Kingdom: Animalia
- Phylum: Chordata
- Class: Actinopterygii
- Division: Teleostei
- Order: Blenniiformes
- Family: Tripterygiidae
- Genus: Helcogramma
- Species: H. nigra

Binomial name
- Helcogramma nigra Williams & Howe, 2003

Species of fish

Helcogramma nigra, the Rotuma triplefin, is a species of triplefin blenny in the genus Helcogramma. It was described by Jeffrey T. Williams and Jeffrey C. Howe in 2003. This species occurs in the west-central Pacific Ocean where it has been recorded from Papua New Guinea, the Solomon Islands, Vanuatu and Rotuma.
