= Helcogramma ascensionis =

Conservation status
- Least Concern (IUCN 3.1)

Scientific classification
- Kingdom: Animalia
- Phylum: Chordata
- Class: Actinopterygii
- Order: Blenniiformes
- Family: Tripterygiidae
- Genus: Helcogramma
- Species: H. ascensionis

Binomial name
- Helcogramma ascensionis Lubbock, 1980

Species of fish

Helcogramma ascensionis, the Ascension triplefin, is a species of triplefin blenny in the genus Helcogramma. it was described by Roger Lubbock in 1980. It has been recorded at depths of 0 to 5 metres (0 to 16 ft) in tidal pools and rocky reefs around the islands of Saint Helena and Ascension in the south eastern Atlantic Ocean.
