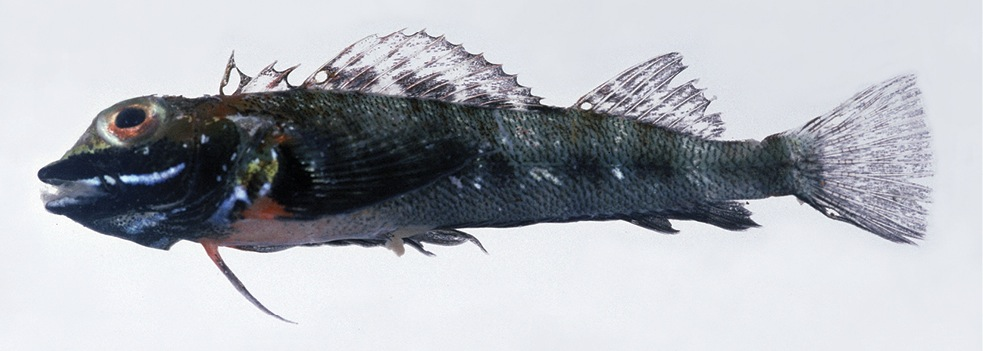

Conservation status
- Least Concern (IUCN 3.1)

Scientific classification
- Kingdom: Animalia
- Phylum: Chordata
- Class: Actinopterygii
- Order: Blenniiformes
- Family: Tripterygiidae
- Genus: Helcogramma
- Species: H. trigloides

Binomial name
- Helcogramma trigloides (Bleeker, 1858)

Synonyms
- Tripterygion trigloides Bleeker, 1858

= Helcogramma trigloides =

Species of fish

Helcogramma trigloides, the scarf triplefin, is a species of triplefin blenny in the genus Helcogramma. It was described by Pieter Bleeker in 1858 as Tripterygion trigloides. This is a widespread species in the western Pacific Ocean.
