= Helcogramma albimacula =

Conservation status
- Least Concern (IUCN 3.1)

Scientific classification
- Kingdom: Animalia
- Phylum: Chordata
- Class: Actinopterygii
- Order: Blenniiformes
- Family: Tripterygiidae
- Genus: Helcogramma
- Species: H. albimacula

Binomial name
- Helcogramma albimacula Williams & Howe, 2003

Species of fish

Helcogramma albimacula is a species of triplefin blenny in the genus Helcogramma. It was described by Jeffery T. Williams and Jeffrey C. Howe in 2003. This species is endemic to the Philippines.
