= Helcogramma nesion =

Conservation status
- Least Concern (IUCN 3.1)

Scientific classification
- Kingdom: Animalia
- Phylum: Chordata
- Class: Actinopterygii
- Order: Blenniiformes
- Family: Tripterygiidae
- Genus: Helcogramma
- Species: H. nesion

Binomial name
- Helcogramma nesion Williams & Howe, 2003

Species of fish

Helcogramma nesion is a species of triplefin blenny in the genus Helcogramma. It was described by Jeffrey T. Williams and Jeffrey C. Howe in 2003. This species is found in the western Pacific Ocean where it is endemic to Japan, it is restricted to the Izu Islands, Ogasawara Islands and to the island of Okino-shima which is at the south-western tip of Shikoku.
