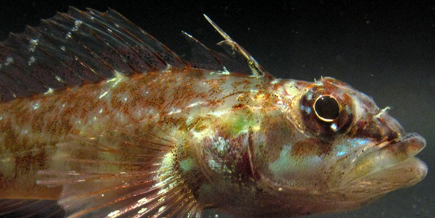
- Helcogramma steinitzi

Conservation status
- Least Concern (IUCN 3.1)

Scientific classification
- Kingdom: Animalia
- Phylum: Chordata
- Class: Actinopterygii
- Order: Blenniiformes
- Family: Tripterygiidae
- Genus: Helcogramma
- Species: H. steinitzi

Binomial name
- Helcogramma steinitzi Clark, 1980

= Red triplefin =

Species of fish

Helcogramma steinitzi, known commonly as the red triplefin, is a species of triplefin blenny in the genus Helcogramma. It was described by Eugenie Clark in 1980. The specific name honours the marine biologist and herpetologist Heinz Steinitz (1909-1971) of the Hebrew University, Jerusalem. This species occurs in the north western Indian Ocean from the Red Sea to the Persian Gulf.
