= Helcogramma billi =

Conservation status
- Least Concern (IUCN 3.1)

Scientific classification
- Kingdom: Animalia
- Phylum: Chordata
- Class: Actinopterygii
- Order: Blenniiformes
- Family: Tripterygiidae
- Genus: Helcogramma
- Species: H. billi

Binomial name
- Helcogramma billi P. E. Hadley Hansen, 1986

Species of fish

Helcogramma billi is a species of triplefin blenny in the genus Helcogramma. It was described by Patricia E. Hadley Hansen in 1986, and the specific name honours the American ichthyologist Bill Smith-Vaniz, who collected the types Hadley Hansen examined when describing the species. This species is common on rock surfaces and beneath ledges in waters down to 10 metres (33 ft) in depth around the coasts of Sri Lanka.
