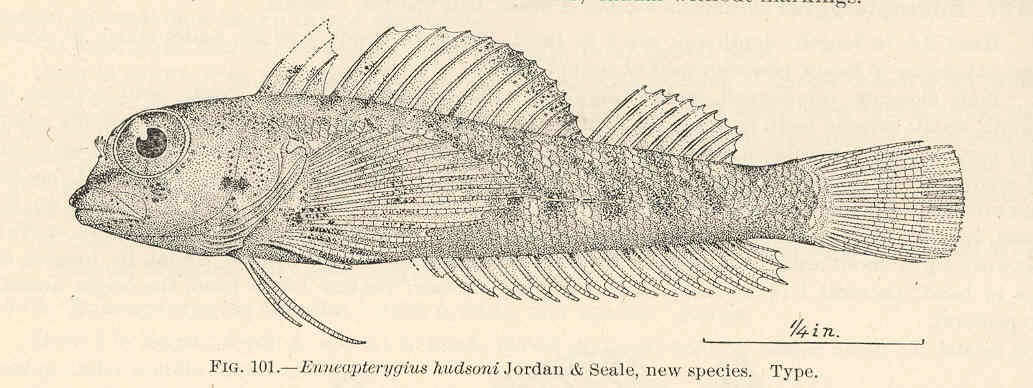

Conservation status
- Least Concern (IUCN 3.1)

Scientific classification
- Kingdom: Animalia
- Phylum: Chordata
- Class: Actinopterygii
- Order: Blenniiformes
- Family: Tripterygiidae
- Genus: Helcogramma
- Species: H. hudsoni

Binomial name
- Helcogramma hudsoni (Jordan & Seale, 1906)

Synonyms
- Enneapterygius hudsoni Jordan & Seale, 1906

= Hudson's triplefin =

Species of fish

Hudson's triplefin (Helcogramma hudsoni) is a species of triplefin blenny in the genus Helcogramma. It was described by David Starr Jordan and Alvin Seale in 1906, the specific name honouring the illustrator of their monograph on Samoan fishes, R.L. Hudson. This species is found in the western Pacific Ocean where it has been recorded from the Izu Islands, Ryukyu Islands, Savo Island, New Caledonia, Vanuatu, Fiji, and Samoa.
