= Helcogramma aquila =

Conservation status
- Least Concern (IUCN 3.1)

Scientific classification
- Kingdom: Animalia
- Phylum: Chordata
- Class: Actinopterygii
- Order: Blenniiformes
- Family: Tripterygiidae
- Genus: Helcogramma
- Species: H. aquila

Binomial name
- Helcogramma aquila Williams & McCormick, 1990

Species of fish

Helcogramma aquila, the darktail triplefin or blacktail triplefin, is a species of triplefin blenny in the genus Helcogramma. It was described by Jeffrey T. Williams and Carolyn J. McCormick in 1990. This species occurs in the western Pacific Ocean in the Batanes Islands in the Philippines and it has also been found off Guam.
