= Red-eye threefin =

Conservation status
- Least Concern (IUCN 3.1)

Scientific classification
- Kingdom: Animalia
- Phylum: Chordata
- Class: Actinopterygii
- Order: Blenniiformes
- Family: Tripterygiidae
- Genus: Helcogramma
- Species: H. ellioti

Binomial name
- Helcogramma ellioti (Herre, 1944)

Synonyms
- Tripterygion ellioti Herre, 1944

Species of fish

The red-eye threefin (Helcogramma ellioti) is a species of triplefin blenny in the genus Helcogramma. It was described by Albert William Herre in 1944 who honoured the Scottish naturalist and ethnologist Walter Elliot (1803-1897) in its specific name. This species occurs in the Indian Ocean along the eastern and western coasts of India and around Sri Lanka.
