= New Caledonian triplefin =

Conservation status
- Least Concern (IUCN 3.1)

Scientific classification
- Kingdom: Animalia
- Phylum: Chordata
- Class: Actinopterygii
- Order: Blenniiformes
- Family: Tripterygiidae
- Genus: Helcogramma
- Species: H. novaecaledoniae

Binomial name
- Helcogramma novaecaledoniae Fricke, 1994

Species of fish

Helcogramma novaecaledoniae, known commonly as the New Caledonian triplefin, is a species of triplefin blenny in the genus Helcogramma. It was described by Ronald Fricke in 1994. This species is found in the western Pacific Ocean where it has been recorded from New Caledonia, the Loyalty Islands and Guadalcanal.
