= Helcogramma cerasina =

Conservation status
- Least Concern (IUCN 3.1)

Scientific classification
- Kingdom: Animalia
- Phylum: Chordata
- Class: Actinopterygii
- Order: Blenniiformes
- Family: Tripterygiidae
- Genus: Helcogramma
- Species: H. cerasina

Binomial name
- Helcogramma cerasina Williams & Howe, 2003

Species of fish

Helcogramma cerasina is a species of triplefin blenny in the genus Helcogramma. It was described by Jeffrey T. Williams and Jeffrey C. Howe in 2003. This species is found in the western Pacific Ocean where it has been recorded from Tonga and Vatoa in southern Fiji.
