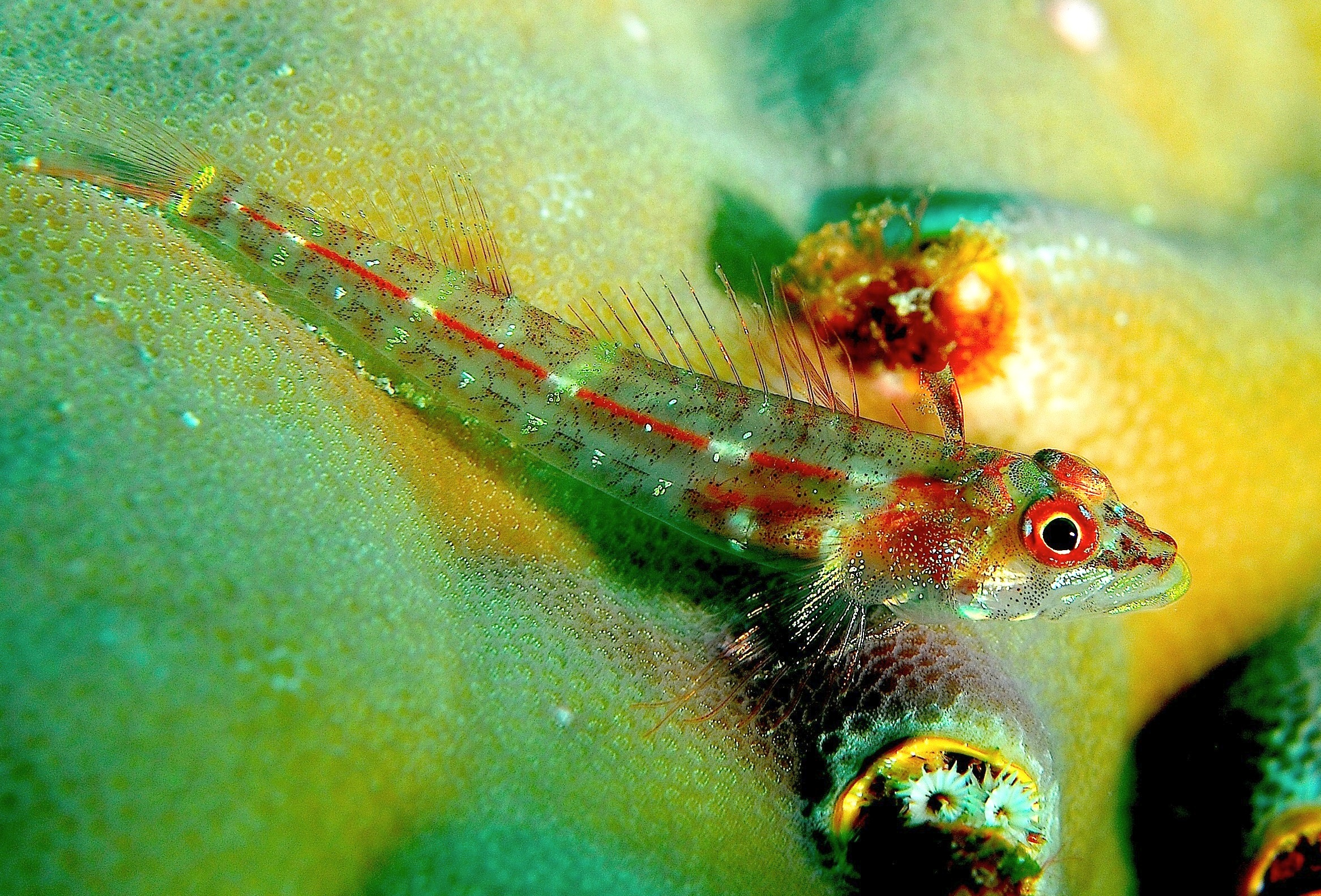

Conservation status
- Least Concern (IUCN 3.1)

Scientific classification
- Kingdom: Animalia
- Phylum: Chordata
- Class: Actinopterygii
- Order: Blenniiformes
- Family: Tripterygiidae
- Genus: Helcogramma
- Species: H. gymnauchen

Binomial name
- Helcogramma gymnauchen (Weber, 1909)

Synonyms
- Tripterygium gymnauchen Weber, 1909; Tripterygion gymnauchen (Weber, 1909)

= Red-finned triplefin =

Species of fish

The red-finned triplefin (Helcogramma gymnauchen) is a triplefin blenny of the family Tripterygiidae, found in the western Pacific from Indonesia, Papua New Guinea, and northern Australia, at depths of between 1 and 8 m. It reaches a maximum length of 4 cm.

The red-finned triplefin lives on reefs, and feeds on algae and small invertebrates.
