= Helcogramma microstigma =

Conservation status
- Least Concern (IUCN 3.1)

Scientific classification
- Kingdom: Animalia
- Phylum: Chordata
- Class: Actinopterygii
- Order: Blenniiformes
- Family: Tripterygiidae
- Genus: Helcogramma
- Species: H. microstigma

Binomial name
- Helcogramma microstigma Holleman, 2006

Species of fish

Helcogramma microstigma is a species of triplefin blenny in the genus Helcogramma. It was described by Wouter Holleman in 2006. This species occurs in the western Indian Ocean off Mozambique, Comoro Islands and Madagascar.
