= Helcogramma alkamr =

Conservation status
- Least Concern (IUCN 3.1)

Scientific classification
- Kingdom: Animalia
- Phylum: Chordata
- Class: Actinopterygii
- Order: Blenniiformes
- Family: Tripterygiidae
- Genus: Helcogramma
- Species: H. alkamr

Binomial name
- Helcogramma alkamr Holleman, 2007

Species of fish

Helcogramma alkamr is a species of triplefin blenny in the genus Helcogramma. It was described by Wouter Holleman in 2007. This species is found in the western Indian Ocean from the Comoros to the Seychelles, Mauritius and St Brandon. The specific name is derived from the Arabic name for Madagascar, where this species occurs, Jazirat al-Qumr.
