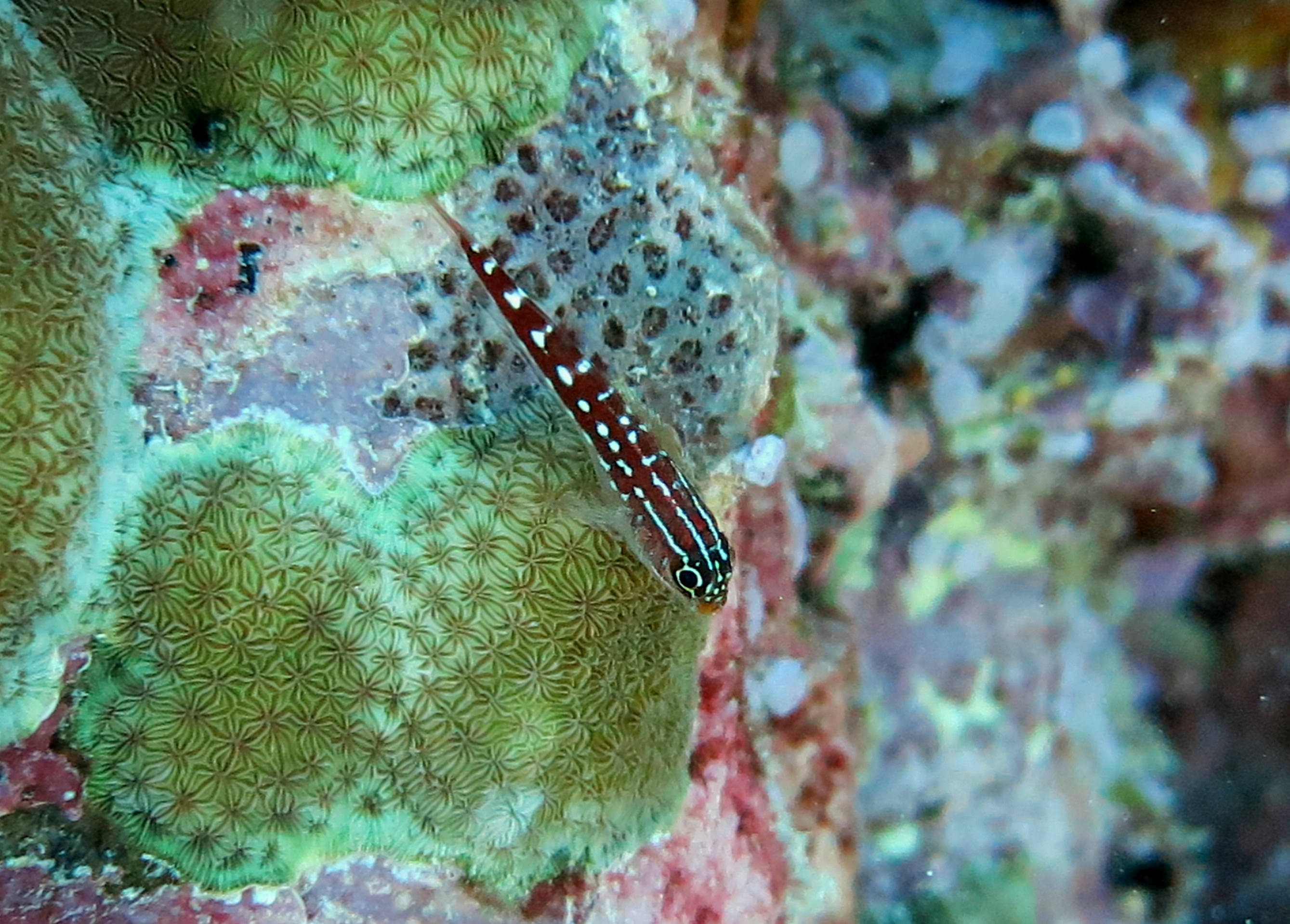

Conservation status
- Data Deficient (IUCN 3.1)

Scientific classification
- Kingdom: Animalia
- Phylum: Chordata
- Class: Actinopterygii
- Order: Blenniiformes
- Family: Tripterygiidae
- Genus: Helcogramma
- Species: H. maldivensis

Binomial name
- Helcogramma maldivensis Fricke & Randall, 1992

= Helcogramma maldivensis =

Species of fish

Helcogramma maldivensis is a species of triplefin blenny in the genus Helcogramma. It was described by Ronald Fricke and John E. Randall in 1992. This species has only been recorded from the South part of the Male Atoll in the Maldives where the only known specimens were found in a shallow lagoon with a maximum depth of 5 metres (16 ft) and a sandy bottom.
