= Helcogramma atauroensis =

Scientific classification
- Domain: Eukaryota
- Kingdom: Animalia
- Phylum: Chordata
- Class: Actinopterygii
- Order: Blenniiformes
- Family: Tripterygiidae
- Genus: Helcogramma
- Species: H. atauroensis

Binomial name
- Helcogramma atauroensis Fricke & Erdmann, 2017

Species of fish

Helcogramma atauroensis, the red-anal triplefin, is a species of triplefin blenny in the genus Helcogramma. it was described by Ronald Frick and Mark V Erdmann in 2017. It occurs in the western Pacific on the coasts of Timor-Leste where it is associated with reefs down to 3 metres (9.8 ft).
