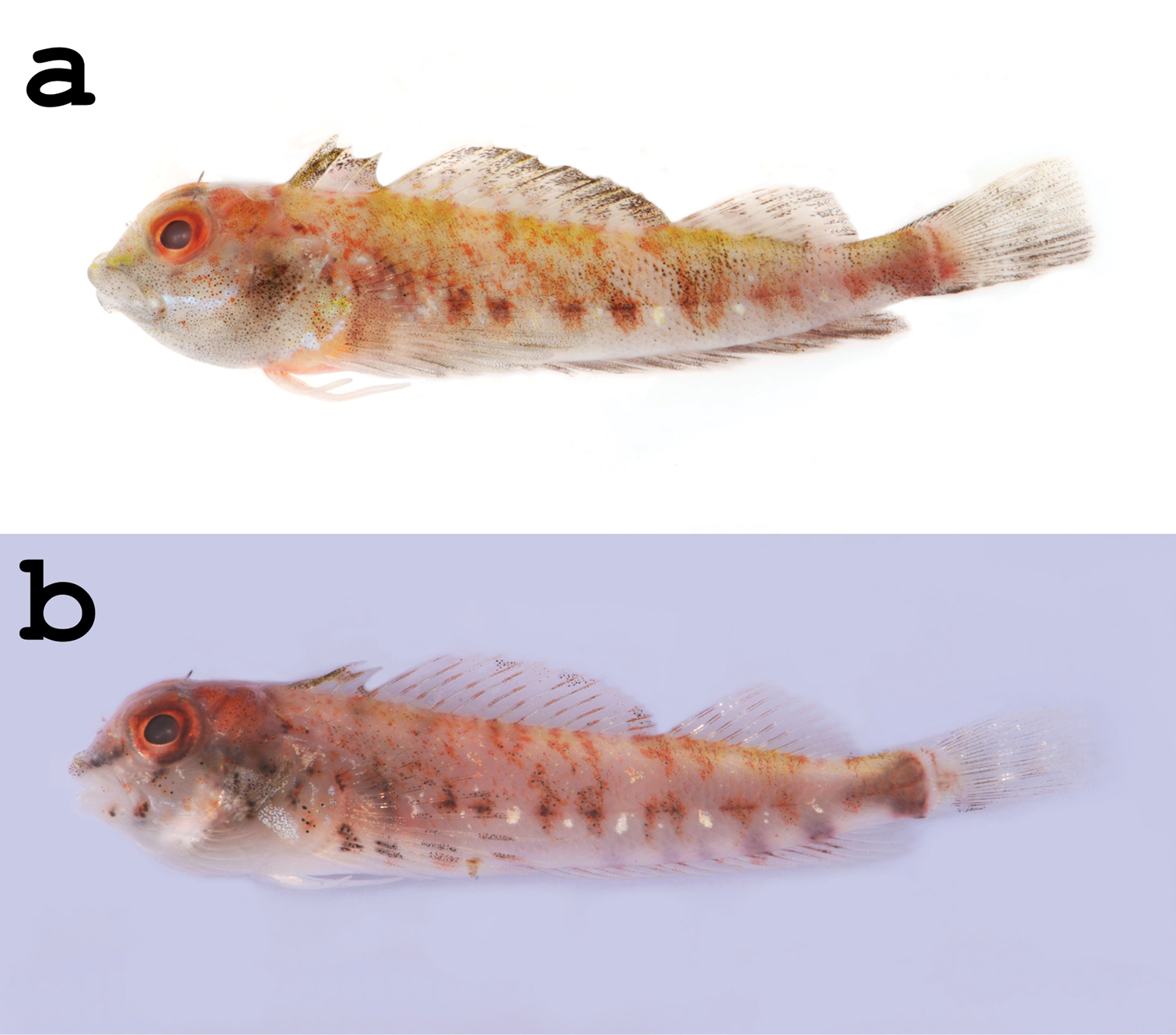

Scientific classification
- Kingdom: Animalia
- Phylum: Chordata
- Class: Actinopterygii
- Order: Blenniiformes
- Family: Tripterygiidae
- Genus: Helcogramma
- Species: H. williamsi

Binomial name
- Helcogramma williamsi M. C. Chiang & I. S. Chen, 2012

= Helcogramma williamsi =

Species of fish

Helcogramma williamsi is a species of triplefin blenny in the genus Helcogramma which is widespread in the western Pacific Ocean. It is found in rocky areas with sandy channels at depths of 1 to 3 metres (3.3 to 9.8 ft) It was described in 2012 from a type collected from Taiwan. The specific name honours the ichthyologist Jeffrey T. Williams of the Smithsonian Institution.
