= Blackfin triplefin =

Conservation status
- Least Concern (IUCN 3.1)

Scientific classification
- Kingdom: Animalia
- Phylum: Chordata
- Class: Actinopterygii
- Division: Teleostei
- Order: Blenniiformes
- Family: Tripterygiidae
- Genus: Helcogramma
- Species: H. fuscopinna

Binomial name
- Helcogramma fuscopinna Holleman, 1982

Species of fish

The blackfin triplefin (Helcogramma fuscopinna) is a species of triplefin blenny in the genus Helcogramma. It was described by Wouter Holleman in 1982. This species occurs between 0 and 50 centimetres (0.0 and 1.6 ft) in the western Indian Ocean along the eastern coast of Africa from KwaZulu Natal to northern Kenya and east to the Maldives, living on rock surfaces and beneath ledges.
