= Hooded triplefin =

Conservation status
- Least Concern (IUCN 3.1)

Scientific classification
- Kingdom: Animalia
- Phylum: Chordata
- Class: Actinopterygii
- Order: Blenniiformes
- Family: Tripterygiidae
- Genus: Helcogramma
- Species: H. capidata

Binomial name
- Helcogramma capidata Rosenblatt, 1960

Species of fish

The hooded triplefin (Helcogramma capidata) is a species of triplefin blenny in the genus Helcogramma. It was described by Richard Rosenblatt in 1960. This species is widespread in the western Pacific Ocean from the Mariana Islands east to Samoa, Fiji and Tonga; it has been recorded from Sabah too.
