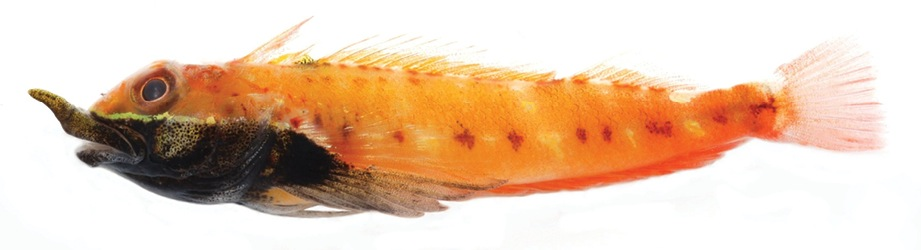

Conservation status
- Least Concern (IUCN 3.1)

Scientific classification
- Kingdom: Animalia
- Phylum: Chordata
- Class: Actinopterygii
- Order: Blenniiformes
- Family: Tripterygiidae
- Genus: Helcogramma
- Species: H. rhinoceros

Binomial name
- Helcogramma rhinoceros Hansen, 1986

= Rhinocerus triplefin =

Species of fish

Helcogramma rhinoceros, known commonly as the rhinocerus triplefin or the rhino threefin, is a species of triplefin blenny in the genus Helcogramma. It was described by P.E. Hadley Hansen in 1986. This species is found throughout the Indo-Pacific from Thailand to Fiji and Tonga.
