= Helcogramma serendip =

Conservation status
- Least Concern (IUCN 3.1)

Scientific classification
- Kingdom: Animalia
- Phylum: Chordata
- Class: Actinopterygii
- Order: Blenniiformes
- Family: Tripterygiidae
- Genus: Helcogramma
- Species: H. serendip

Binomial name
- Helcogramma serendip Holleman, 2007

Species of fish

Helcogramma serendip is a species of triplefin blenny in the genus Helcogramma. It was described by Wouter Holleman in 2007. This species is found only around the coasts of Sri Lanka and its specific name references the old Arabic name for Sri Lanka.
