= Springer's triplefin =

Conservation status
- Least Concern (IUCN 3.1)

Scientific classification
- Kingdom: Animalia
- Phylum: Chordata
- Class: Actinopterygii
- Order: Blenniiformes
- Family: Tripterygiidae
- Genus: Helcogramma
- Species: H. springeri

Binomial name
- Helcogramma springeri Hansen, 1986

Species of fish

Helcogramma springeri, known commonly as the Springer's triplefin, is a species of triplefin blenny in the genus Helcogramma. It was described by P.E. Hadley Hansen in 1986. The specific name honours the ichthyologist Victor G. Springer of the National Museum of Natural History. This species is found in the western Pacific Ocean from Indonesia and the Philippines to northern Australia, including the Great Barrier Reef.
