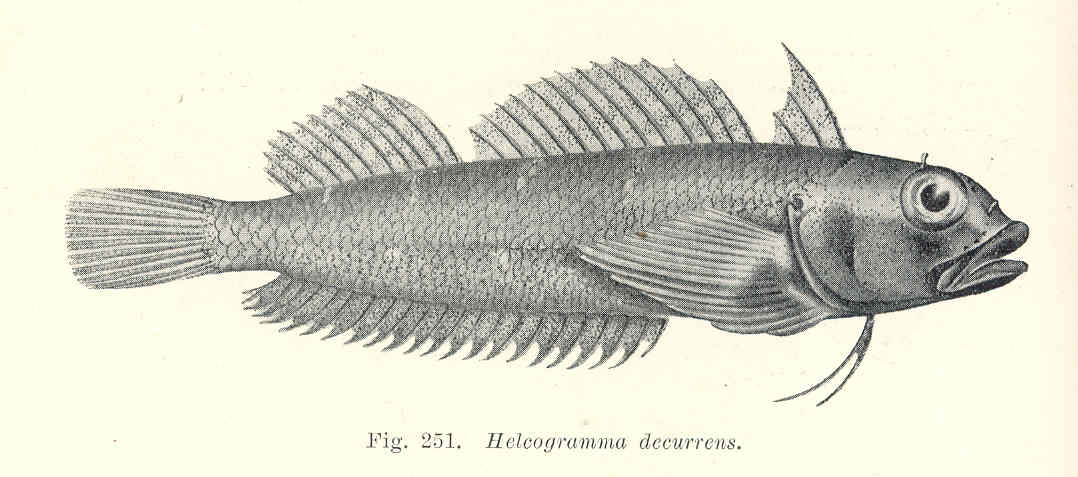

Conservation status
- Least Concern (IUCN 3.1)

Scientific classification
- Kingdom: Animalia
- Phylum: Chordata
- Class: Actinopterygii
- Order: Blenniiformes
- Family: Tripterygiidae
- Genus: Helcogramma
- Species: H. decurrens

Binomial name
- Helcogramma decurrens McCulloch & Waite, 1918

Synonyms
- Vauclusella calva Whitley, 1944

= Black-throated triplefin =

Species of fish

The black-throated triplefin (Helcogramma decurrens) is a species of triplefin blenny in the genus Helcogramma. It was described by Allan Riverstone McCulloch and Edgar Ravenswood Waite in 1918. This species occurs along the western and southern coasts of Australia where it is found down to depths of 13 metres (43 ft) in both the intertidal and subtidal zones where it hides among algae growing on rocky substrates.
