= Helmet triplefin =

Conservation status
- Least Concern (IUCN 3.1)

Scientific classification
- Kingdom: Animalia
- Phylum: Chordata
- Class: Actinopterygii
- Order: Blenniiformes
- Family: Tripterygiidae
- Genus: Helcogramma
- Species: H. kranos

Binomial name
- Helcogramma kranos Fricke, 1997

Species of fish

The helmet triplefin (Helcogramma kranos) is a species of triplefin blenny in the genus Helcogramma. It was described by Fricke in 1997. This species is endemic to the islands of Komodo, Lombok, Nusa Tenggara Barat and Timor in Indonesia.
