= Helcogramma larvata =

Conservation status
- Data Deficient (IUCN 3.1)

Scientific classification
- Kingdom: Animalia
- Phylum: Chordata
- Class: Actinopterygii
- Order: Blenniiformes
- Family: Tripterygiidae
- Genus: Helcogramma
- Species: H. larvata

Binomial name
- Helcogramma larvata Fricke & Randall, 1992

Species of fish

Helcogramma larvata is a species of triplefin blenny in the genus Helcogramma. It was described by Ronald Fricke and John E. Randall in 1992. This species has only been recorded from North Male Atoll in the Maldives where the only known specimens were found in a shallow lagoon with a maximum depth of 5 metres (16 ft) and a sandy bottom.
