= Helcogramma randalli =

Conservation status
- Least Concern (IUCN 3.1)

Scientific classification
- Kingdom: Animalia
- Phylum: Chordata
- Class: Actinopterygii
- Order: Blenniiformes
- Family: Tripterygiidae
- Genus: Helcogramma
- Species: H. randalli

Binomial name
- Helcogramma randalli Williams & Howe, 2003

Species of fish

Helcogramma randalli, Randall's triplefin, is a species of triplefin blenny in the genus Helcogramma. It was described by Jeffrey T. Williams and Jeffrey C. Howe in 2003 and named it in honour of the ichthyologist John Ernest Randall of the Bishop Museum in Honolulu who collected all of the known specimens. This species occurs in the western Pacific Ocean and is endemic to the islands of central Indonesia such as Bali, Lombok, Timor and Komodo.
