= Helcogramma vulcana =

Conservation status
- Least Concern (IUCN 3.1)

Scientific classification
- Kingdom: Animalia
- Phylum: Chordata
- Class: Actinopterygii
- Order: Blenniiformes
- Family: Tripterygiidae
- Genus: Helcogramma
- Species: H. vulcana

Binomial name
- Helcogramma vulcana Randall & Clark, 1993

Species of fish

Helcogramma vulcana, the volcano triplefin, is a species of triplefin blenny in the genus Helcogramma. It was described by John E. Randall and Eugenie Clark in 1993. This species is found in the western Pacific Ocean where it has been recorded from Bali to Gunung Api and Manuk in the Banda Sea.
