= Helcogramma ememes =

Conservation status
- Least Concern (IUCN 3.1)

Scientific classification
- Kingdom: Animalia
- Phylum: Chordata
- Class: Actinopterygii
- Order: Blenniiformes
- Family: Tripterygiidae
- Genus: Helcogramma
- Species: H. ememes

Binomial name
- Helcogramma ememes Holleman, 2007

Species of fish

Helcogramma ememes is a species of triplefin blenny in the genus Helcogramma. It was described by Wouter Holleman in 2007 who used the initials of his mentor Margaret Mary Smith (1916-1987) of the J. L. B. Smith Institute of Ichthyology to create this species specific name. Smith and her husband, J. L. B. Smith, had collected many specimens of this blenny in the 1960s. This species is found in the western Indian Ocean along the coats of East Africa from the Bazaruto Islands in Mozambique to Malindi in Kenya, it is also found in the Comoro Islands, Mauritius and the Seychelles.
