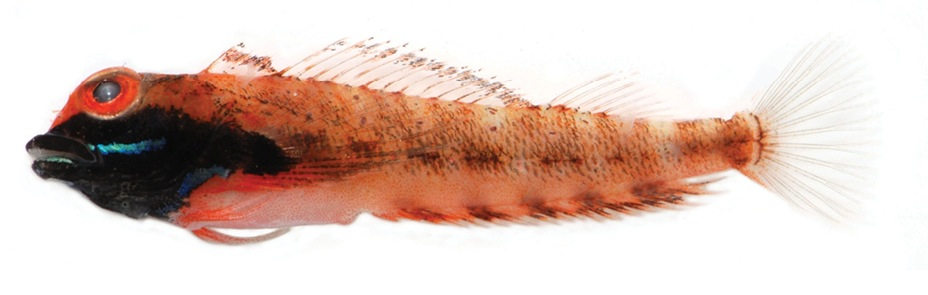

Conservation status
- Least Concern (IUCN 3.1)

Scientific classification
- Kingdom: Animalia
- Phylum: Chordata
- Class: Actinopterygii
- Order: Blenniiformes
- Family: Tripterygiidae
- Genus: Helcogramma
- Species: H. fuscipectoris

Binomial name
- Helcogramma fuscipectoris (Fowler, 1946)

Synonyms
- Enneapterygius fuscipectoris Fowler, 1946

= Fourspot triplefin =

Species of fish

The fourspot triplefin (Helcogramma fuscipectoris) is a species of triplefin blenny in the genus Helcogramma.

== Description ==
The fourspot triplefin grows to a maximum length of 3.2 cm (1.3 in). Like other members of its family, the dorsal fin is divided into three sections. The first two are spinous with a total of fifteen to nineteen spines, while the third fin has eight to eleven soft rays.

== Distribution and habitat ==
The fourspot triplefin is native to the tropical and subtropical western Pacific Ocean. Its range extends from Japan and China westwards to Vietnam, Thailand and Malaysia, and southeastwards to the Philippines, Indonesia and Vanuatu. It occurs on coralline rock and on rocky reefs no deeper than 8 m (26 ft).

== Status ==
The fourspot triplefin is a fairly common species in the western Pacific Ocean and occurs in several marine protected areas. It does not face any particular threat and has a wide range so the International Union for Conservation of Nature has assessed it as being of "least concern".
