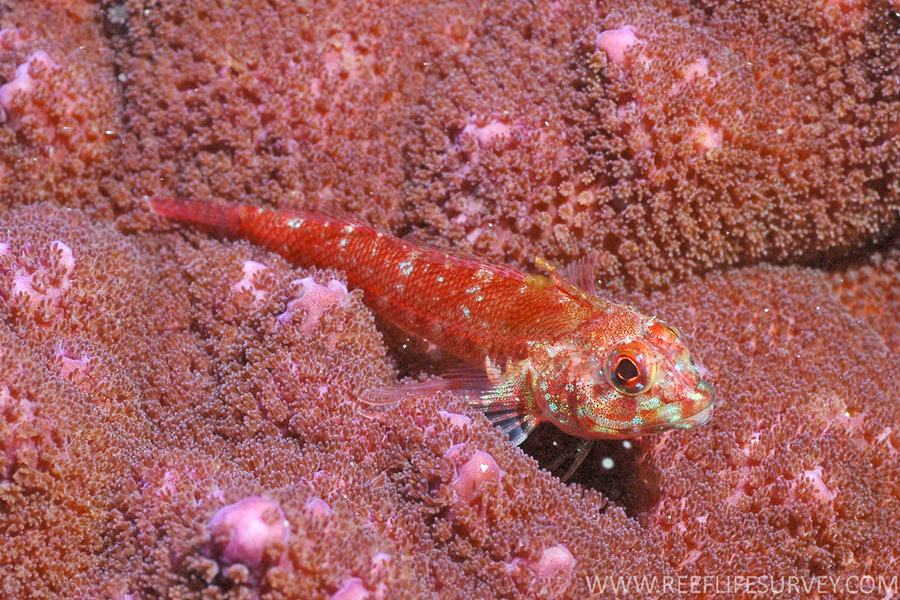
- Helcogramma decurrens, female
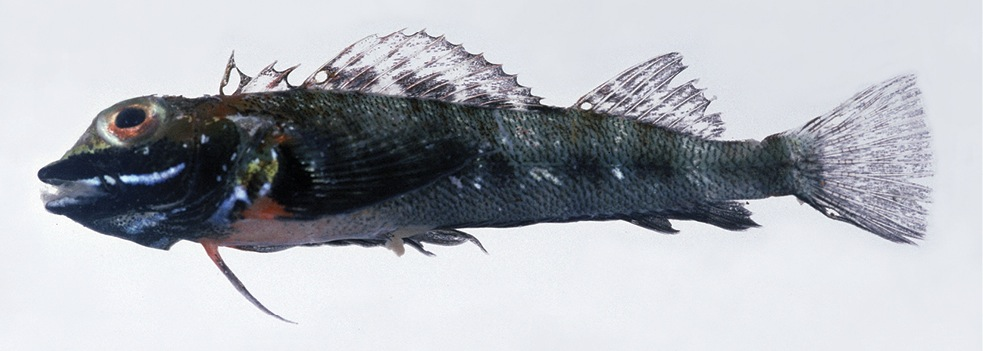
- Helcogramma trigloides

Scientific classification
- Kingdom: Animalia
- Phylum: Chordata
- Class: Actinopterygii
- Division: Teleostei
- Order: Blenniiformes
- Family: Tripterygiidae
- Subfamily: Tripterygiinae
- Genus: Helcogramma; McCulloch & Waite, 1918

Type species
- Helcogramma decurrens McCulloch & Waite, 1918

= Helcogramma =

Genus of fishes

Helcogramma is a genus in the triplefin family Tripterygiidae. The blennies in the genus Helcogramma are found throughout the Indo-Pacific and in the South Atlantic Ocean off the islands of St Helena and Ascension.

== Characteristics ==
The fishes in the genus Helcogramma are characterised by the possession of a continuous lateral line which bends down towards the operculum, this lateral line comprises 7–39 tubular pored scales. There are three spines in the first dorsal fin and the anal fin has one spine, the pelvic fin has a single spine and two rays. The head is scaleless and normally the bases of the dorsal and anal fins have a scaleless strip. There are five bones in the joint between the caudal fin and the vertebrae, the hypurals.

== Species ==
There are currently 41 recognized species in this genus:

- Helcogramma albimacula J. T. Williams & Howe, 2003 (Whitespot triplefin)
- Helcogramma alkamr Holleman, 2007
- Helcogramma aquila J. T. Williams & C. J. McCormick, 1990 (Darktail triplefin)
- Helcogramma ascensionis Lubbock, 1980 (Ascension triplefin)
- Helcogramma atauroensis Fricke & Erdmann, 2017
- Helcogramma billi P. E. Hadley, 1986
- Helcogramma capidata Rosenblatt, 1960 (Hooded triplefin)
- Helcogramma cerasina J. T. Williams & Howe, 2003
- Helcogramma chica Rosenblatt, 1960 (Little hooded triplefin)
- Helcogramma decurrens McCulloch & Waite, 1918 (Black-throated triplefin)
- Helcogramma desa J. T. Williams & Howe, 2003 (Neglected triplefin)
- Helcogramma ellioti (Herre, 1944)
- Helcogramma ememes Holleman, 2007
- Helcogramma fuscipectoris (Fowler, 1946) (Fourspot triplefin)
- Helcogramma fuscopinna Holleman, 1982 (Blackfin triplefin)
- Helcogramma gymnauchen (M. C. W. Weber, 1909) (Red-finned triplefin)
- Helcogramma hudsoni (D. S. Jordan & Seale, 1906) (Hudson's triplefin)
- Helcogramma inclinata (Fowler, 1946) (Triangle triplefin)
- Helcogramma ishigakiensis Aoyagi, 1954
- Helcogramma kranos R. Fricke, 1997 (Helmet triplefin)
- Helcogramma lacuna J. T. Williams & Howe, 2003
- Helcogramma larvata R. Fricke & J. E. Randall, 1992
- Helcogramma maldivensis R. Fricke & J. E. Randall, 1992
- Helcogramma microstigma Holleman, 2006
- Helcogramma nesion J. T. Williams & Howe, 2003
- Helcogramma nigra J. T. Williams & Howe, 2003 (Rotuma triplefin)
- Helcogramma novaecaledoniae R. Fricke, 1994 (New Caledonian triplefin)
- Helcogramma obtusirostris (Klunzinger, 1871) (Hotlips triplefin)
- Helcogramma randalli J. T. Williams & Howe, 2003 (Randall's triplefin)
- Helcogramma rharhabe Holleman, 2007
- Helcogramma rhinoceros P. E. Hadley, 1986 (Rhinocerus triplefin)
- Helcogramma rosea Holleman, 2006 (Rosy triplefin)
- Helcogramma serendip Holleman, 2007
- Helcogramma shinglensis Lal Mohan, 1971
- Helcogramma solorensis R. Fricke, 1997 (Solor triplefin)
- Helcogramma springeri P. E. Hadley, 1986 (Springer's triplefin)
- Helcogramma steinitzi E. Clark, 1980 (Red triplefin)
- Helcogramma striata P. E. Hadley, 1986 (Tropical striped triplefin)
- Helcogramma trigloides (Bleeker, 1858) (Scarf triplefin)
- Helcogramma vulcana J. E. Randall & E. Clark, 1993 (Volcano triplefin)
- Helcogramma williamsi M. C. Chiang & I. S. Chen, 2012
