= Helcogramma desa =

Conservation status
- Least Concern (IUCN 3.1)

Scientific classification
- Kingdom: Animalia
- Phylum: Chordata
- Class: Actinopterygii
- Order: Blenniiformes
- Family: Tripterygiidae
- Genus: Helcogramma
- Species: H. desa

Binomial name
- Helcogramma desa Williams & Howe, 2003

Species of fish

Helcogramma desa, the neglected triplefin, is a species of triplefin blenny in the genus Helcogramma. It was described by Jeffery T. Williams and Jeffrey C. Howe in 2003. This species is known from the western Pacific in Vietnam and the Philippines, including the Spratly Islands.
