= Helcogramma lacuna =

Conservation status
- Least Concern (IUCN 3.1)

Scientific classification
- Kingdom: Animalia
- Phylum: Chordata
- Class: Actinopterygii
- Order: Blenniiformes
- Family: Tripterygiidae
- Genus: Helcogramma
- Species: H. lacuna

Binomial name
- Helcogramma lacuna Williams & Howe, 2003

Species of fish

Helcogramma lacuna, the cavern triplefin, is a species of triplefin blenny in the genus Helcogramma. It was described by Jeffrey T. Williams and Jeffery C. Howe in 2003. This species has only been recorded in the Similan Islands in the Andaman Sea, part of Thailand.
