= Helcogramma obtusirostris =

Conservation status
- Least Concern (IUCN 3.1)

Scientific classification
- Kingdom: Animalia
- Phylum: Chordata
- Class: Actinopterygii
- Order: Blenniiformes
- Family: Tripterygiidae
- Genus: Helcogramma
- Species: H. obtusirostris

Binomial name
- Helcogramma obtusirostris (Klunzinger, 1871)

Synonyms
- Tripterygion obtusirostre Klunzinger, 1871

Species of fish

Helcogramma obtusirostris, the hotlips triplefin or shortsnout triplefin, is a triplefin blenny of the family Tripterygiidae, found from the Red Sea south to South Africa and east to the western Pacific, and the southeast Atlantic, around Ascension Island and St. Helena. It reaches a maximum length of 3.8 cm according to FishBase, but only 4 cm according to "Two Oceans".
