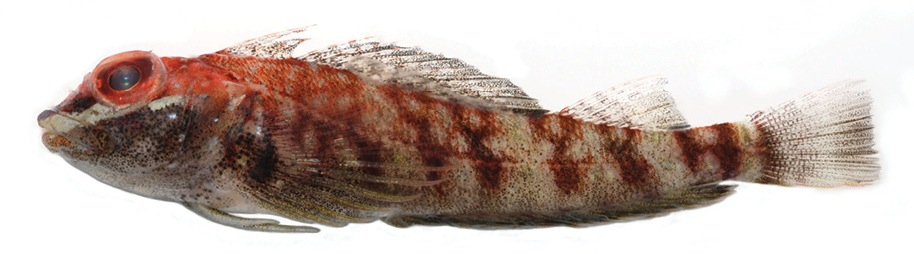

Conservation status
- Least Concern (IUCN 3.1)

Scientific classification
- Kingdom: Animalia
- Phylum: Chordata
- Class: Actinopterygii
- Order: Blenniiformes
- Family: Tripterygiidae
- Genus: Helcogramma
- Species: H. inclinata

Binomial name
- Helcogramma inclinata (Fowler, 1946)

Synonyms
- Enneapterygius inclinatus Fowler, 1946; Helcogramma inclinatum (Fowler, 1946); Tripterygion inclinatum (Fowler, 1946); Helcogramma habena Williams & McCormick, 1990

= Triangle triplefin =

Species of fish

The triangle triplefin (Helcogramma inclinata) is a species of triplefin blenny in the genus Helcogramma. It was described by Henry Weed Fowler in 1946. This species occurs in the western Pacific Ocean in the Ryukyu Islands, Taiwan and islands in Batangas province in the Philippines.
