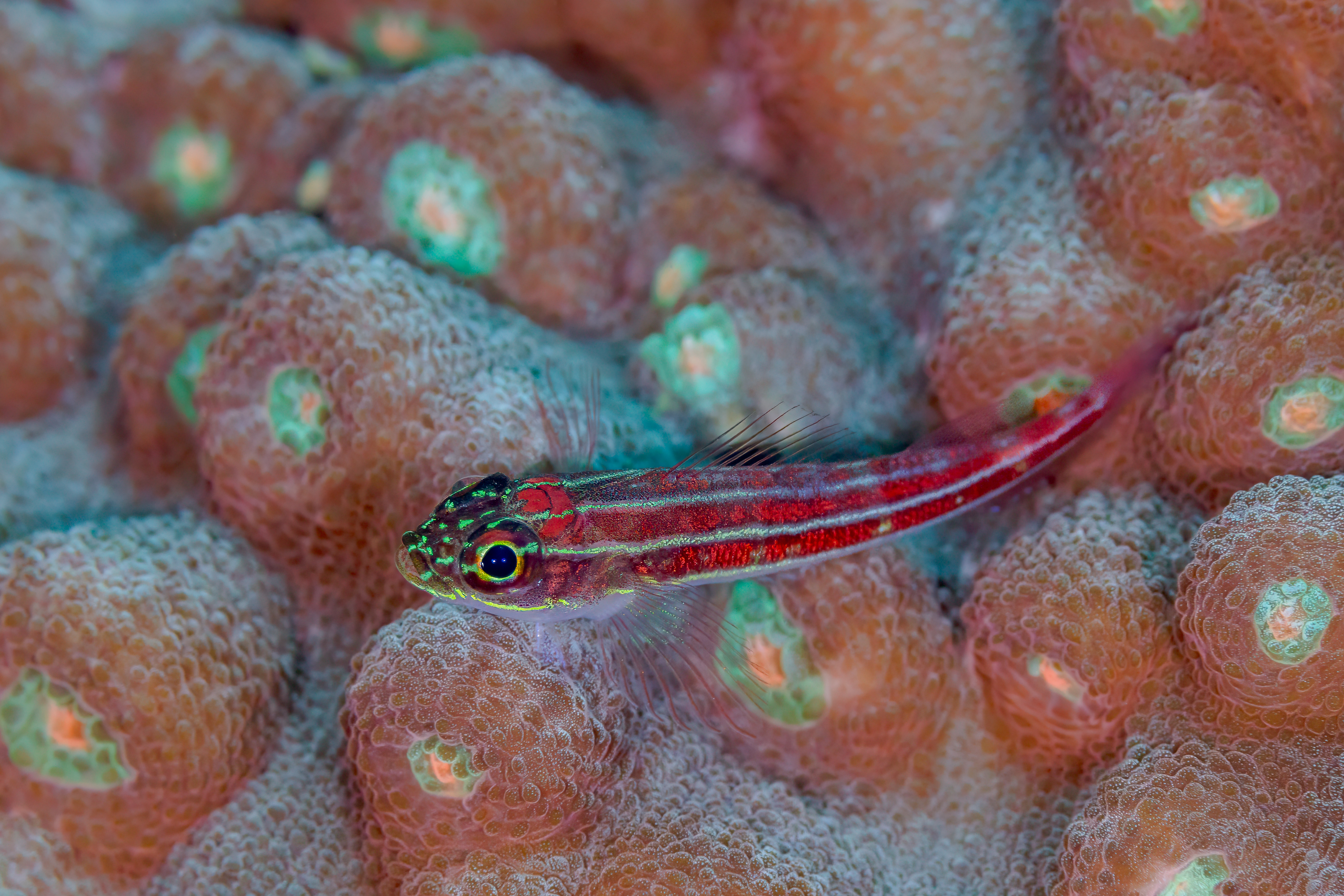

Conservation status
- Least Concern (IUCN 3.1)

Scientific classification
- Kingdom: Animalia
- Phylum: Chordata
- Class: Actinopterygii
- Division: Teleostei
- Order: Blenniiformes
- Family: Tripterygiidae
- Genus: Helcogramma
- Species: H. striata

Binomial name
- Helcogramma striata Hansen, 1986

= Tropical striped triplefin =

Species of fish

The tropical striped triplefin (Helcogramma striata), also called the striped threefin or neon triplefin, is a species of triplefin blenny that is native to the central Indo-Pacific.

== Description ==
The tropical striped triplefin is a small fish that can reach a maximum length of 4 cm. The body is thin, more or less cylindrical section and relatively elongated, its mouth is terminal.

The ventral side of this fish is whitish. The rest of its body is red with white stripes running the length of its body and it has also white spots between the eyes.

The fins are translucent. its eyes are relatively large and the iris is orange.

== Distribution & habitat ==
The tropical striped triplefin is widespread throughout the tropical and subtropical waters of the central Indo-Pacific, from the eastern coast of India, Sri Lanka included, to the Philippines and from south Japan to Solomon Islands.

This triplefin occurs in clear waters with moderate current from the surface down to 30 meters depth. It is normally found perched on coral or other hard surfaces where it watches for drifting food.

== Biology ==
The tropical striped triplefin lives in small group and feeds on zooplankton.

== Conservation status ==
The species is targeted but not thought to be threatened by the aquarium trade. It is listed as Least Concern (LC) on the UICN.
