= Gnathia jimmybuffetti =

Scientific classification
- Kingdom: Animalia
- Phylum: Arthropoda
- Clade: Pancrustacea
- Class: Malacostraca
- Order: Isopoda
- Family: Gnathiidae
- Genus: Gnathia
- Species: G. jimmybuffetti

Binomial name
- Gnathia jimmybuffetti Erasmus, Hadfield, Sikkel, and Smit, 2023

Species of isopod

Gnathia jimmybuffetti is a species of isopod native to the Florida Keys. It was described by a team of researchers from the University of Miami and North-West University in 2023. This makes it the first new species of gnathiid to be discovered in Florida over the past 100 years.

== Etymology ==
Gnathia jimmybuffetti is named after American singer Jimmy Buffett. Isopods are a type of crustacean, a subphylum referenced in the title of Buffett's 1973 album A White Sport Coat and a Pink Crustacean.

== Description ==
Gnathia jimmybuffetti measures roughly three-millimeters in length. It possesses a slightly produced frontal margin, making it distinguishable from other species in the region.

== Ecology ==
=== Diet ===
Gnathia jimmybuffetti is a parasitic isopod that feeds on mostly fishes. It feeds mostly on French grunts, Haemulon flavolineatum, bluestriped grunt, and Haemulon sciurus.
