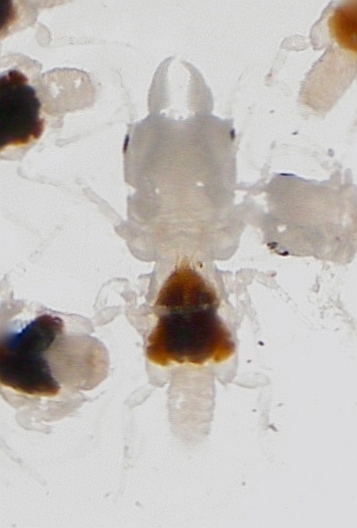
- Male specimen

Scientific classification
- Kingdom: Animalia
- Phylum: Arthropoda
- Class: Malacostraca
- Order: Isopoda
- Family: Gnathiidae
- Genus: Gnathia
- Species: G. marleyi

Binomial name
- Gnathia marleyi Farquharson, Smit & Sikkel, 2012

= Gnathia marleyi =

Species of Caribbean crustacean named after Bob Marley

Gnathia marleyi is a species of crustacean in the family Gnathiidae. It is named after reggae musician Bob Marley. It is a parasite that infests and feeds on the blood of such fish as the French grunt (Haemulon flavioliniatum). This tiny species is only found in the Caribbean Sea. It only eats while in the juvenile stage. It can be found hiding among sea sponges, algae, and pieces of dead coral.

== Description ==
The cephalosome of adult male specimens has a distinct produced frontal border with conical superior fronto-lateral processes with a slightly sunken inferior conical medio-frontal process. The dentate blades of the mandibles each contain ten or eleven processes, with the overall mandible being .8 times the length of the cephalasome. The cephalosome of adult females is rectangular with convex lateral margins. It is 1.2 times as wide as it is long, and has no paraocular ornamentation. The frontal border is broadly rounded, slightly concave anteriorly, and produced. The backward-directed mandible on the third-stage praniza has eight large triangular teeth and two small teeth at the tip.

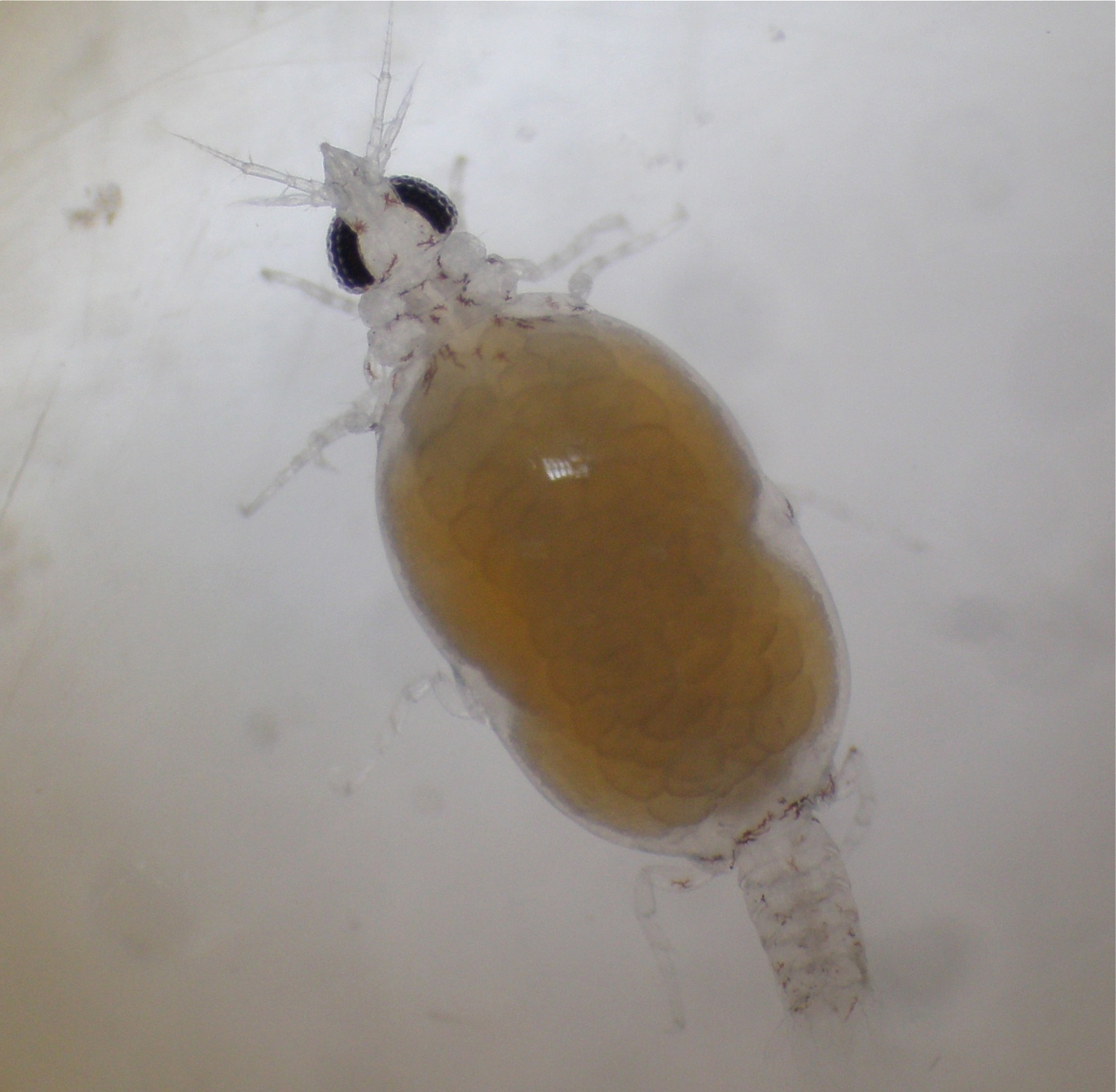
Female Gnathia marleyi with eggs

== Distribution and habitat ==
This species is only found in the Caribbean Sea, where it is abundant. It lives in the shallow waters of coral reefs, primarily in the eastern Caribbean.

== Behaviour ==
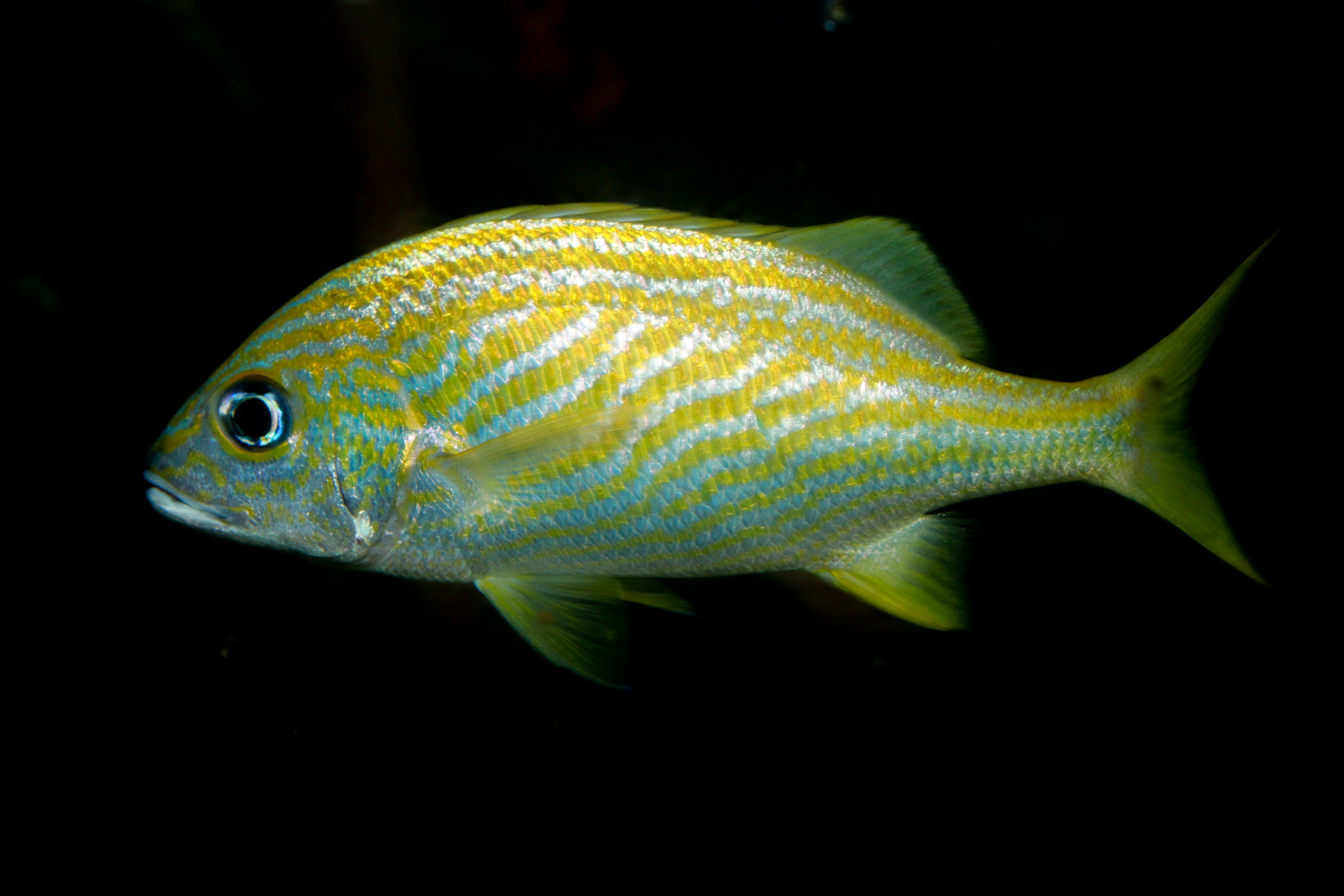
A French grunt (Haemulon flavioliniatum), a common host for Gnathia marleyi

Gnathia marleyi is a protelian parasite quite similar ecologically to non-marine, blood-sucking ticks and mosquitoes. This species remains hidden among sponges, algae, and debris on the sea floor. It has the ability to attack fish by surprise. Once attached to the fish, it feeds on its blood, lymph or mucus. It does this only during the juvenile stage. After reaching maturity, it ceases to feed and becomes a free-living, benthic organism. It survives on the blood it has consumed until the time of its death. During this period, believed to be about two to three weeks, it seeks to reproduce.

=== Sensory cues ===
In a study to determine sensory cues used by Gnathia marleyi, field experiments were conducted in the Virgin Islands. From June 2008 through August 2010, marine biologists examined cues used by this species to help locate host fish. They used experimental traps which offered both olfactory and visual cues to the parasite from live French grunts (Haemulon flavioliniatum). It was determined that a substantially higher number of gnathiids were attracted to the traps than when only visual cues or control traps were used. Both the traps using visual cues and the control traps, which were empty or contained only a rock, yielded similar results.

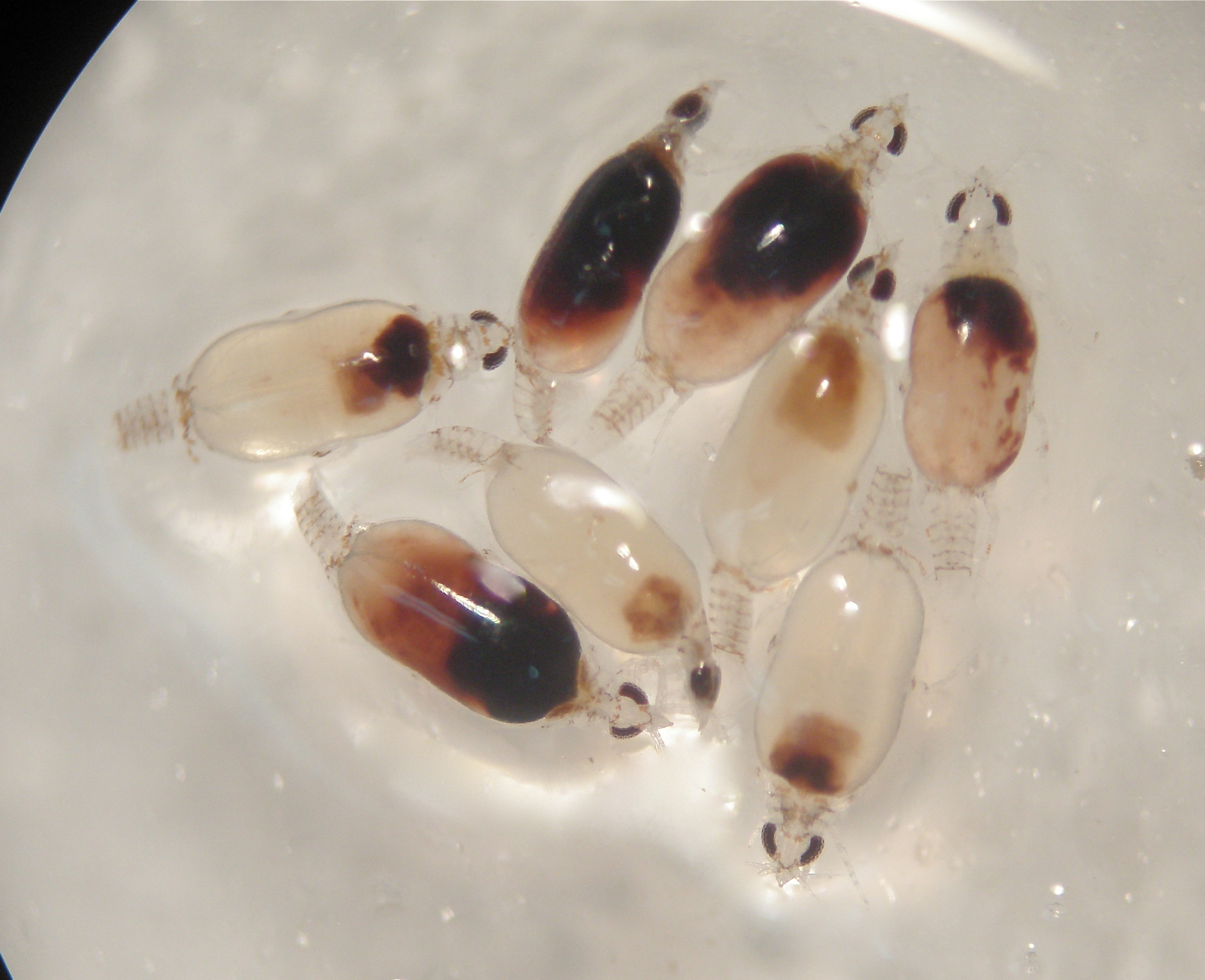
Juvenile specimens

Findings of the study suggest that, particularly during nocturnal and crepuscular periods, attempting to attract specimens using only visual cues by resting or slow-moving fish is not enough to attract Gnathia marleyi. However, using only olfactory cues will attract this species. As a side benefit, the traps engineered for use in this study provide a new method that can be used to sample free-living gnathiid isopods.

== Discovery and naming ==
The species was discovered by field marine biologist Paul Sikkel around 2002 in the U.S. Virgin Islands. It was the first new Caribbean species of Gnathiidae to be discovered in over twenty years. Sikkel named the species after Marley because of his "respect and admiration" for his music. He also stated that this species is "as uniquely Caribbean as was Marley". Considering that this species is so prevalent, Sikkel assumed that it had already been identified as a species. He eventually delivered a specimen to Nico J. Smit, a member of his research team at North-West University in South Africa. Smit then confirmed that the taxonomists had overlooked the species, and that it had yet to be named. Sikkel and others are doing research into the relationships between gnathiid populations and the health of other communities of species living within the coral reef. Charon Farquharson of the University of Johannesburg in South Africa and Smit are both part of the research team. Their work is funded in part by the National Science Foundation (NSF).

Preserved Gnathia marleyi specimens will be permanently kept at the American Museum of Natural History in New York City. An exhibit to publicly feature this species at the museum is under discussion.

== See also ==
- Desis bobmarleyi
- List of organisms named after famous people (born 1925–1949)
