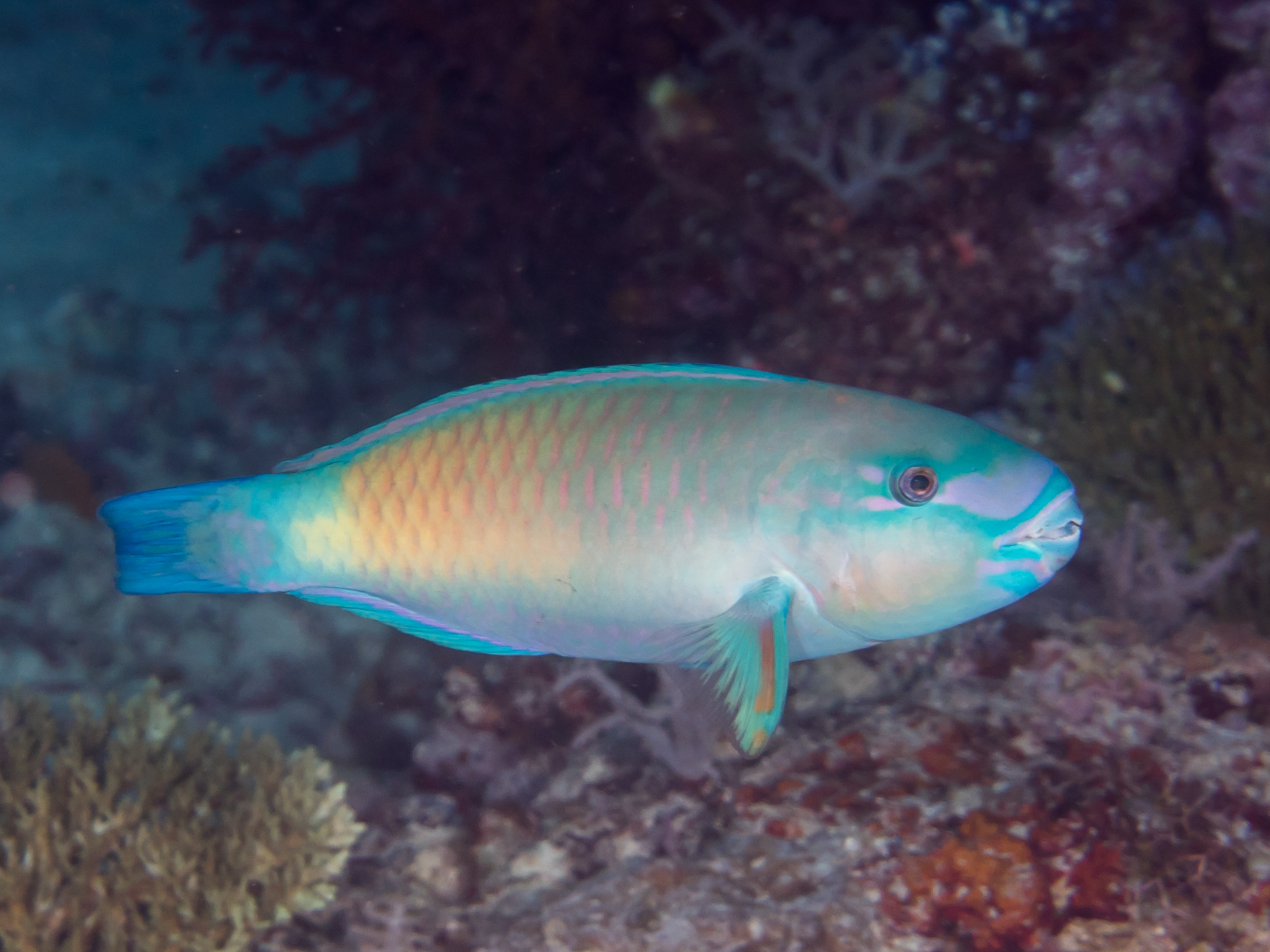

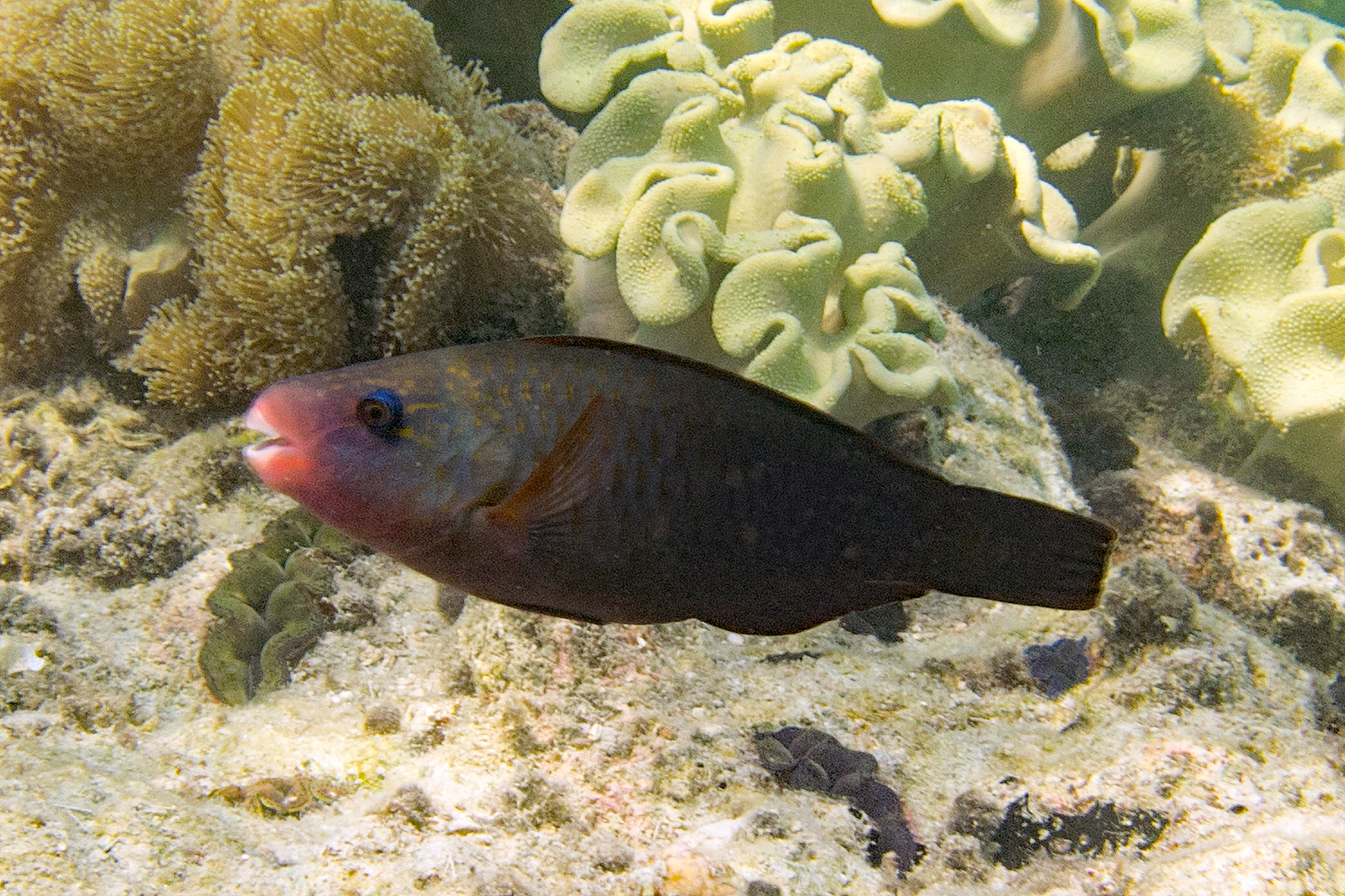
- Male (top) and female (bottom)

Conservation status
- Least Concern (IUCN 3.1)

Scientific classification
- Kingdom: Animalia
- Phylum: Chordata
- Class: Actinopterygii
- Division: Teleostei
- Order: Labriformes
- Family: Labridae
- Genus: Chlorurus
- Species: C. spilurus

Binomial name
- Chlorurus spilurus (Valenciennes, 1840)

Synonyms
- Scarus spilurus Valenciennes, 1840

= Chlorurus spilurus =

Species of ray-finned fishes

Chlorurus spilurus, commonly known as the Pacific daisy parrotfish or Pacific bullethead parrotfish and in Hawaiian called uhu, is a species of marine fish in the family Scaridae. The Pacific daisy parrotfish is widespread throughout the tropical waters of the Pacific.

== Taxonomy ==
Chlorurus spilurus was once synonymized with Chlorurus sordidus, but recent study indicates that C. spilurus is distinct from Forsskal's species. This species has hybridized with Chlorurus perspicillatus.

== Distribution ==
Chlorurus spilurus can be found in the Western and Central Pacific, from Indonesia to Hawaii and Pitcairn Island.

== Description ==
The initial phase fish, which can be female or male, have a white beak, an overall dark reddish coloration with a white caudal peduncle and fin with a black patch. There is great variation in the coloration among the terminal males of this species. Their body is greenish with big scales outlined with purple-blue lines, three purple-blue stripes around the mouth, and an orange and a white patch on the cheek.

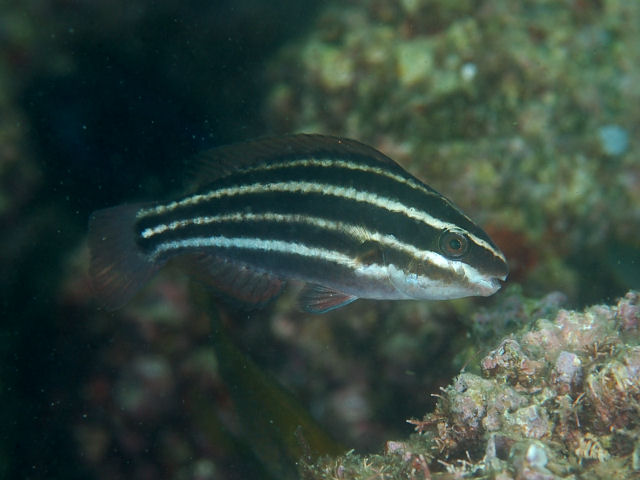
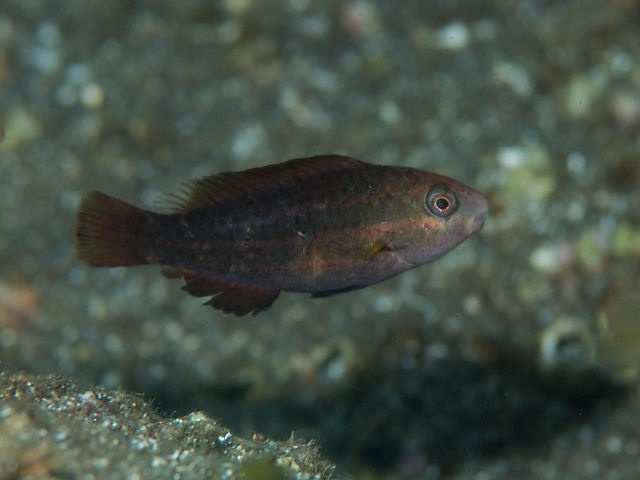
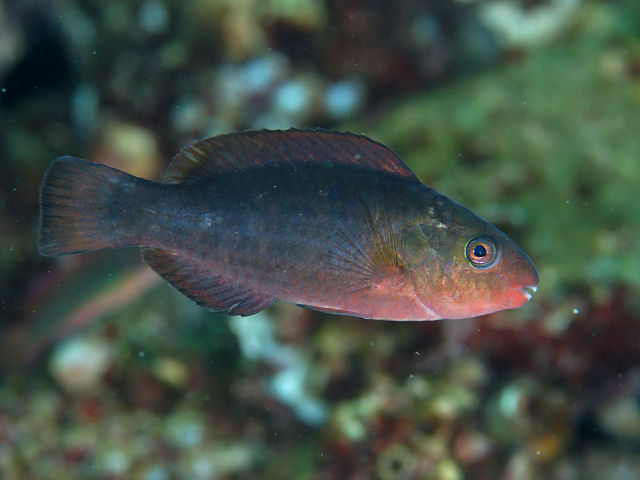
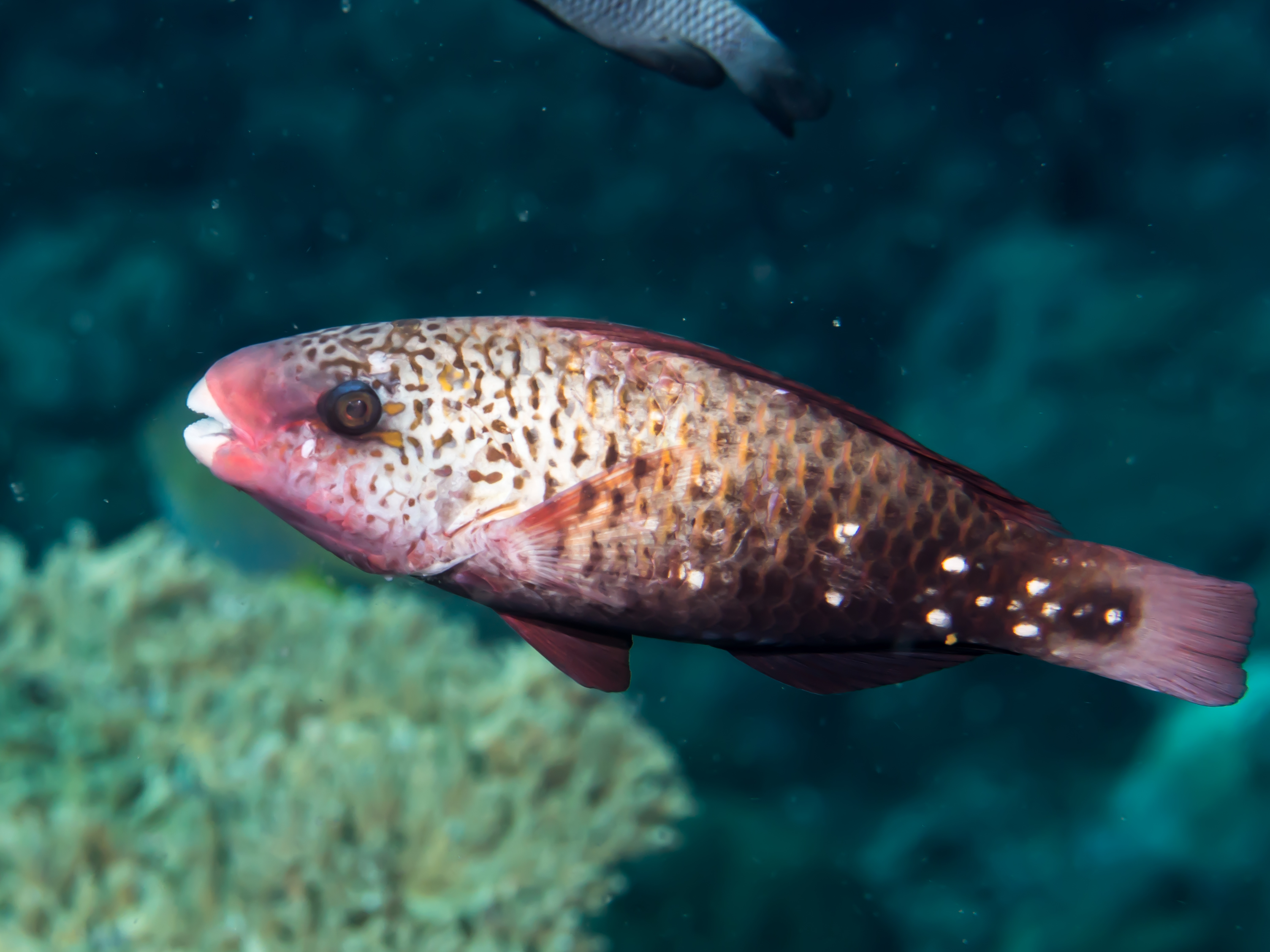
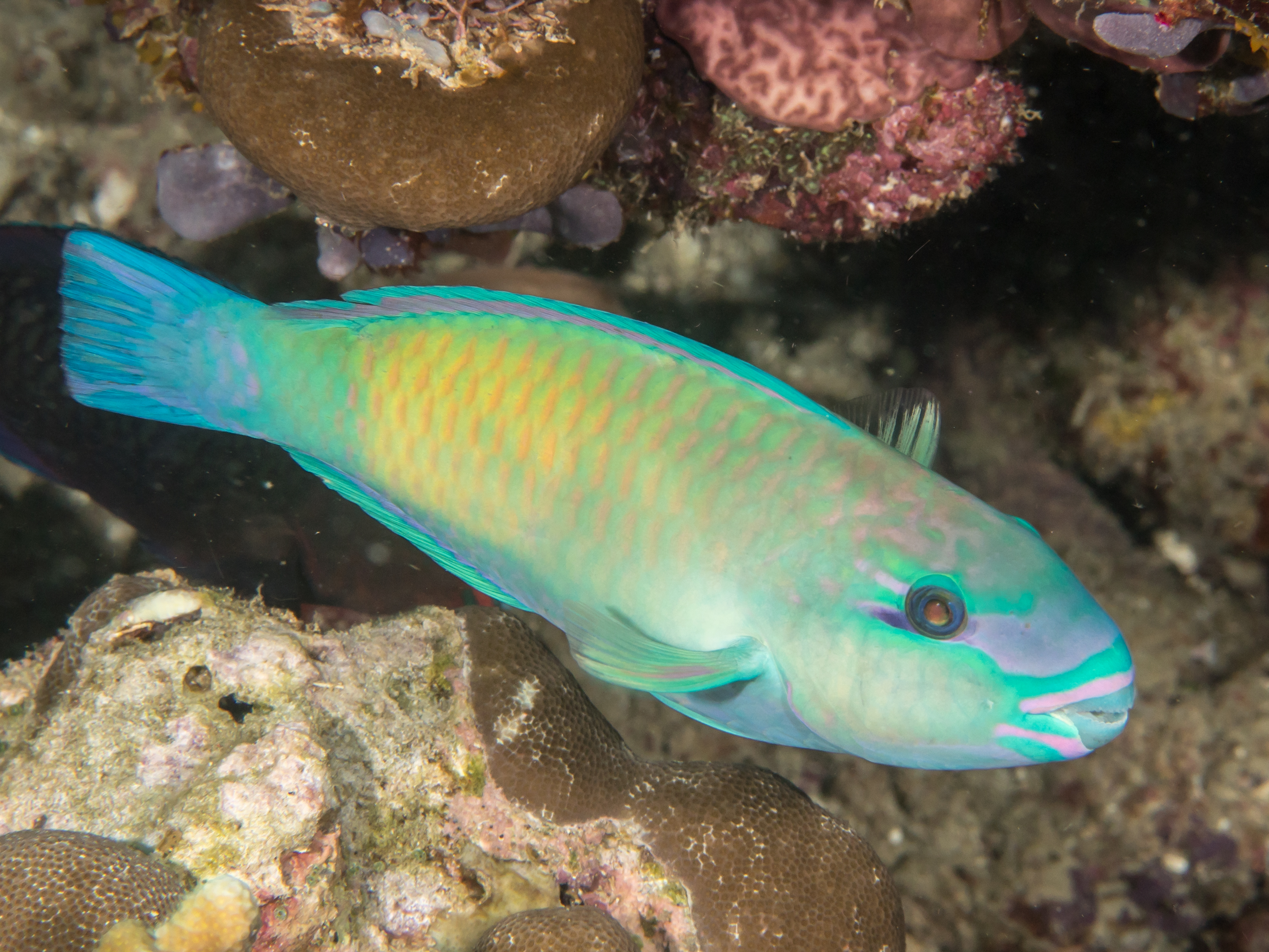
Growth series: from youngest juvenile, to female, to male

== Habitat ==
These parrotfish are found in diverse coral reefs and lagoons.

== Diet ==
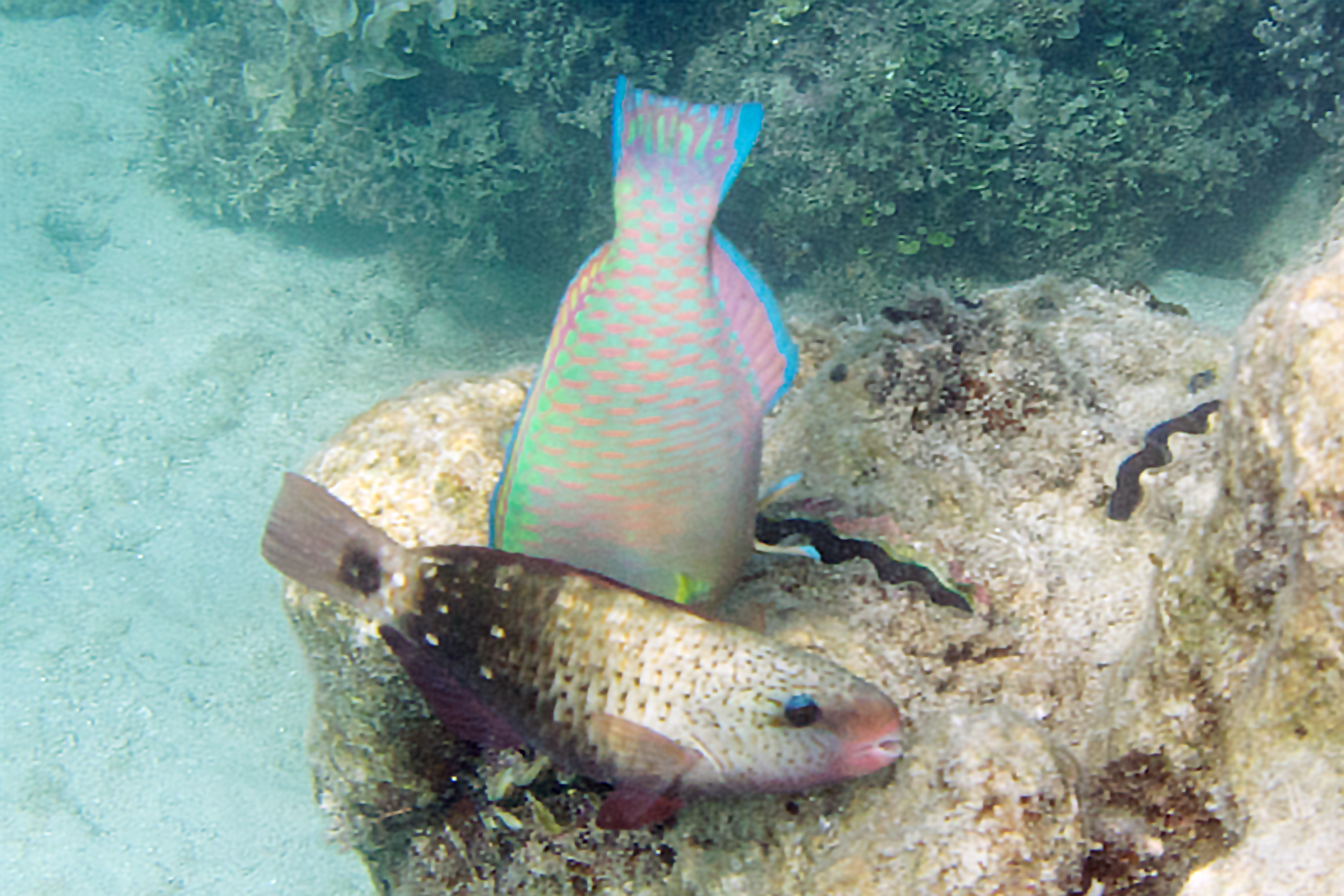
Initial phase (front) with Scarus sp. (back), Queensland, Australia

These parrotfish have strong beaks that are designed to easily break off chunks of coral to feed on coral polyps and algae growing on the coral.

== Cultural significance ==
The pacific bullethead parrotfish was, and still is a favorite amongst fishermen for meals. They were usually eaten raw, but also were boiled on occasion. The Uhu also has a prominent space in Hawaiian culture and folklore, particularly in the story of Puniakaia, where a supernatural parrotfish is said to be the parent of all fish species. In the end, two heroes named Kawelo and Makuakeke killed the fish named Uhumaka'ika'i.
