= Gnathia pilosus =

Scientific classification
- Kingdom: Animalia
- Phylum: Arthropoda
- Class: Malacostraca
- Order: Isopoda
- Family: Gnathiidae
- Genus: Gnathia
- Species: G. pilosus

Binomial name
- Gnathia pilosus Hadfield, Smit & Avenant-Oldewage, 2008

Species of crustacean

Gnathia pilosus is the eighth gnathiid species to be described from South Africa. It occurs on the warmer east coast compared to the other seven gnathiids found on the colder west and south coasts of South Africa. Gnathiids have a polymorphic and biphasic life cycle (reproductive stage and ectoparasite larval stage). There are three larval stages with each stage having two forms, namely praniza and zuphea. The praniza is usually a replete, haematophagous phase while the zuphea is an unfed benthic dweller phase. Adults can be found in groups with a single male and up to 43 females and immature specimens. The free-living adults do not feed and are usually hidden in a cavity or sponge where reproduction will occur. The larvae of gnathiid isopods are known to parasitise a large variety of intertidal fish worldwide. The taxonomic classification of gnathiids is usually based on the morphological characteristics of the adult male. The detailed descriptions of the female and larva, however, are also important for identifying these life stages to species level when collected in the absence of males.

== Life cycle ==
Gnathia pilosus is capable of breeding throughout the year, but with the majority breeding in summer and releasing their young in autumn. Gnathia pilosus larvae show decrease in growth over colder months. A decrease in water temperature may be the cause of slower moulting in the winter months. The zuphea 1 is released from the female marsupium in the autumn months and subsequently attaches to their host fish. During feeding, the zuphea 1 transform into the praniza 1. The praniza 1 detaches from the host and rests on the bottom substrate, using the blood meal to sustain itself until moulting into the zuphea 2 after 35 days. The zuphea 2 feeds on a host to become the praniza 2 and moults into a zuphea 3 which will also feed to become the very swollen praniza 3. Within a few weeks, the sex of the praniza 3 can be determined by the presence of either the testes in the male larva or thin ovary strands in the female larvae. The male praniza 3 moults before the female praniza 3 in order to be ready for reproduction as soon as the females mature. This is important as the female requires fertilisation immediately after completing its moult. The larvae increase in length and width with each moult. Embryos develop in the female marsupium until released from the oostegite openings as zuphea 1 larvae. The life cycle from zuphea 1 to adult female fertilization ranges between 125 and 140 days.
