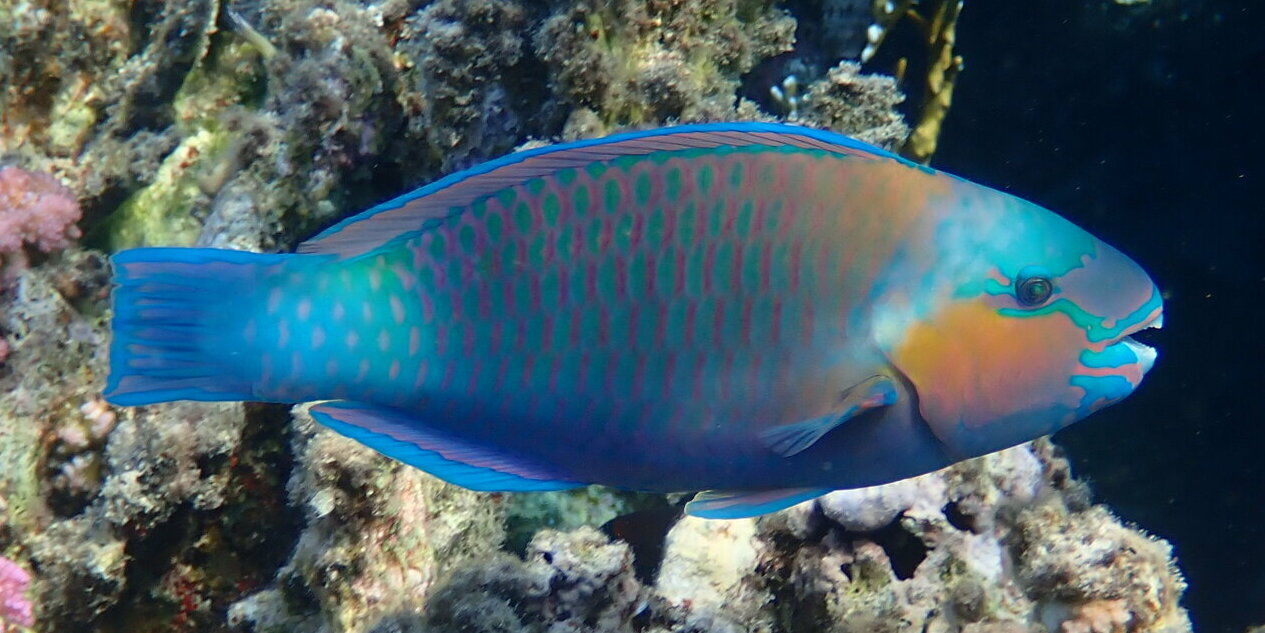
- Terminal phase, in the Red Sea

Conservation status
- Least Concern (IUCN 3.1)

Scientific classification
- Kingdom: Animalia
- Phylum: Chordata
- Class: Actinopterygii
- Order: Labriformes
- Family: Labridae
- Genus: Chlorurus
- Species: C. sordidus

Binomial name
- Chlorurus sordidus (Forsskål, 1775)

Synonyms
- List: Scarus sordidus Forsskål, 1775; Callyodon sordidus (Forsskål, 1775); Scarus erythrodon Valenciennes, 1840; Callyodon erythrodon (Valenciennes, 1840); Xanothon erythrodon (Valenciennes, 1840); Scarus variegatus Valenciennes, 1840; Scarus nigricans Valenciennes, 1840; Scarus purpureus Valenciennes, 1840; Scarus sumbawensis Bleeker, 1848; Scarus gymnognathos Bleeker, 1853; Scarus celebicus Bleeker, 1854; Pseudoscarus margaritus Cartier, 1874; Callyodon margaritus (Cartier, 1874); Scarus margaritus (Cartier, 1874); Xanothon margaritus (Cartier, 1874); Pseudoscarus goldiei Macleay, 1883; Pseudoscarus platodoni Seale, 1901; Pseudoscarus vitriolinus Bryan, 1906; Callyodon cyanogrammus Jordan & Seale, 1906; Callyodon albipunctatus Seale, 1910; Callyodon rostratus Seale, 1910; Scaridea leucotaeniata Fowler, 1944; Callyodon bipallidus J. L. B. Smith, 1956; Xanothon bipallidus (J. L. B. Smith, 1956)

= Chlorurus sordidus =

Species of ray-finned fishes

Chlorurus sordidus, commonly known as the daisy parrotfish or bullethead parrotfish, is a species of marine fish in the family Scaridae.

== Taxonomy ==
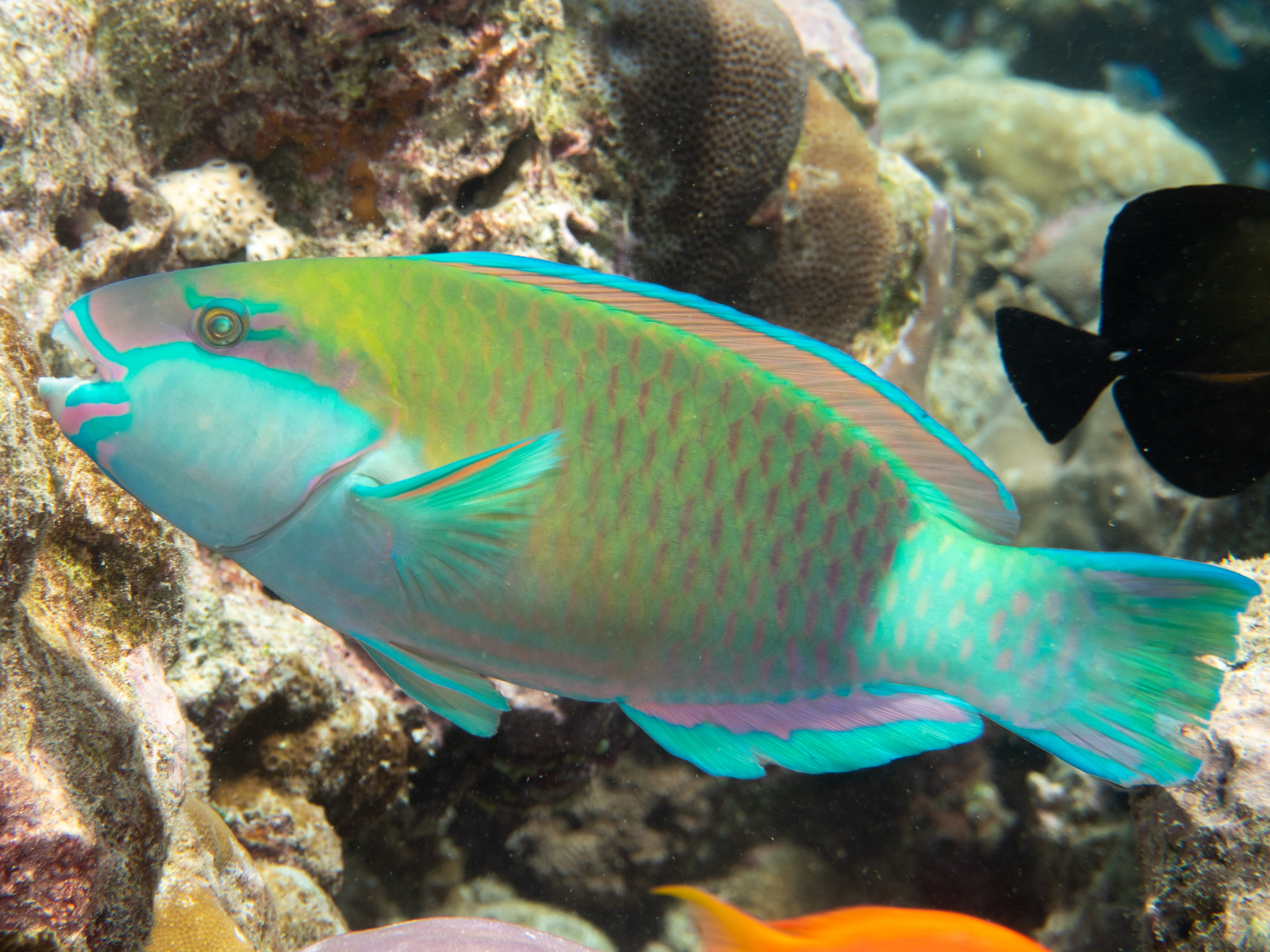
Terminal phase, in the Maldives

Chlorurus sordidus has been split by some authorities and the Red Sea and Indian Ocean populations are regarded as C. sordidus while Chlorurus spilurus occurs in the Pacific and Eastern Indian Ocean, this is based on mitochondrial DNA sequencing and on morphological data. It is probable that the Red Sea population will also be demonstrated to be specifically distinct.

Scarus sordidus was described by the Swedish explorer, orientalist and naturalist Peter Forsskål (1732-1763), the description was published in 1775 with the type locality being Hurghada in Egypt.

== Distribution ==
Chlorurus sordidus is widespread throughout the tropical waters of the Indo-Pacific region, Red Sea included.

== Description ==
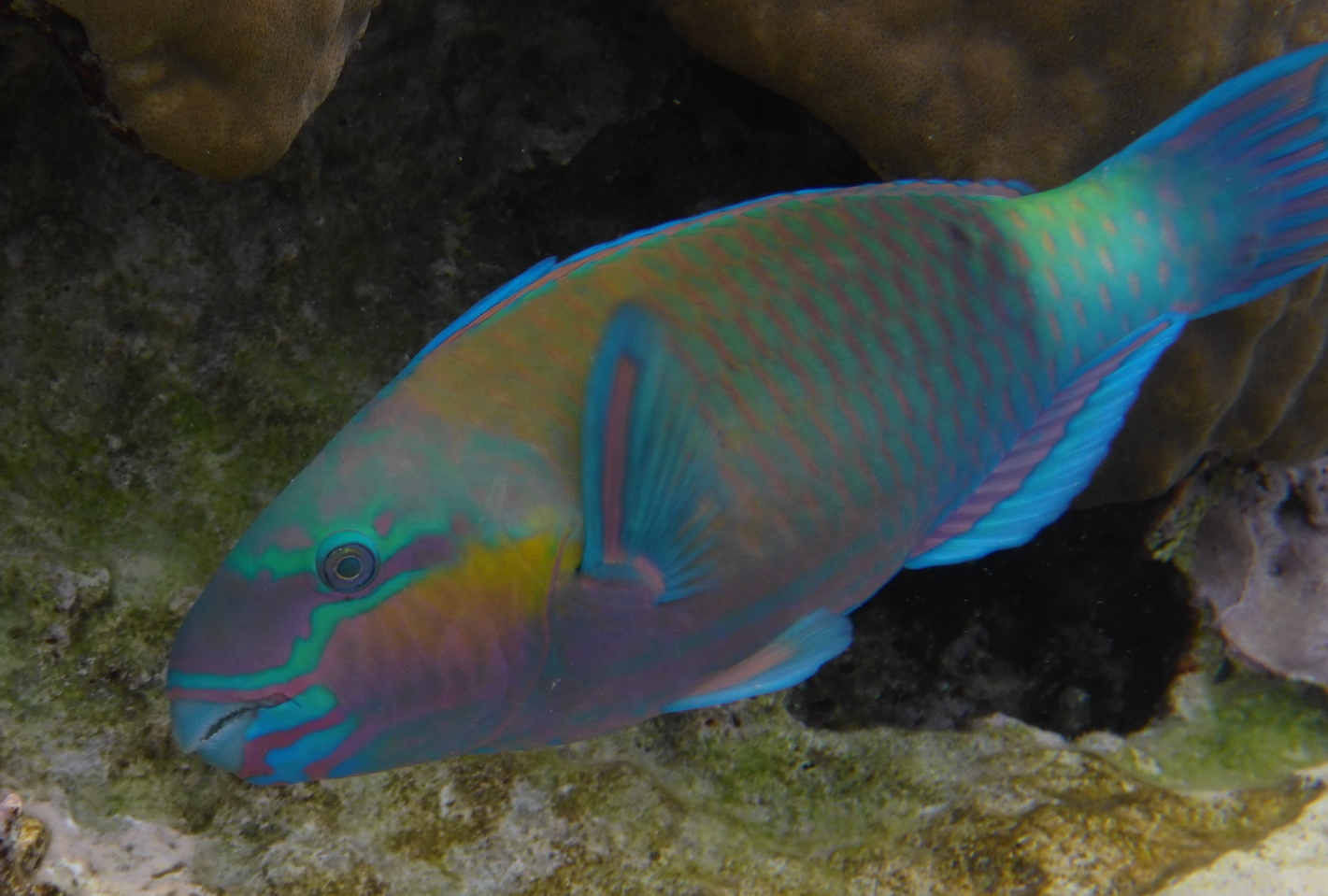
Terminal phase, in the Red Sea

The initial phase has very variable colouration. The smaller fishes can be a uniform dark brown to light gray and they may or may not possess a light band surrounding a dark spot on the caudal peduncle. Larger specimens can show a series of irregular rows of small, light spots towards the tail or they may have the light band surrounding the dark spot on the caudal peduncle. The terminal phase, male, is also variable and may have a large tan area on the flanks or on its caudal peduncle. It has a rounded snout.

Chlorurus sordidus is a medium size fish and can reach a maximum size of 40 cm (16 in) length.

== Habitat and biology ==
Before going to sleep, Chlorurus sordidus secretes a mucus which surrounds the fish in a complete cocoon. The purpose of this mucus cocoon is not completely understood, but one theory is that it protects the fish from parasitic gnathiids. This species is known to be predated on by the honeycomb grouper (Epinephelus merra) and the coral trout (Plectropomus leopardus), its parasites include the monogenean Benedenia scari. It is a sociable fish which schools with other parrotfishes such as Scarus psittacus.

Chlorurus sordidus is one of the most widespread species of parrotfish, and it is highly variable with some of the geographically determined forms probably being at least subspecies. It occurs in both coral rich and open pavement areas of shallow reef flats, in lagoon reefs and seaward reefs, it can also be found at drop-offs. The juveniles inhabit areas of coral rubble in reef flats and lagoons. The juveniles and females in their initial phase form large groups that move long distances between their feeding grounds and the areas used for sleeping at night. They feed on benthic algae. This species is a protogynous hermaphrodite and the sex change occurs when the attain a total length of 35.1–47.2 centimetres (13.8–18.6 in).

== Gallery ==
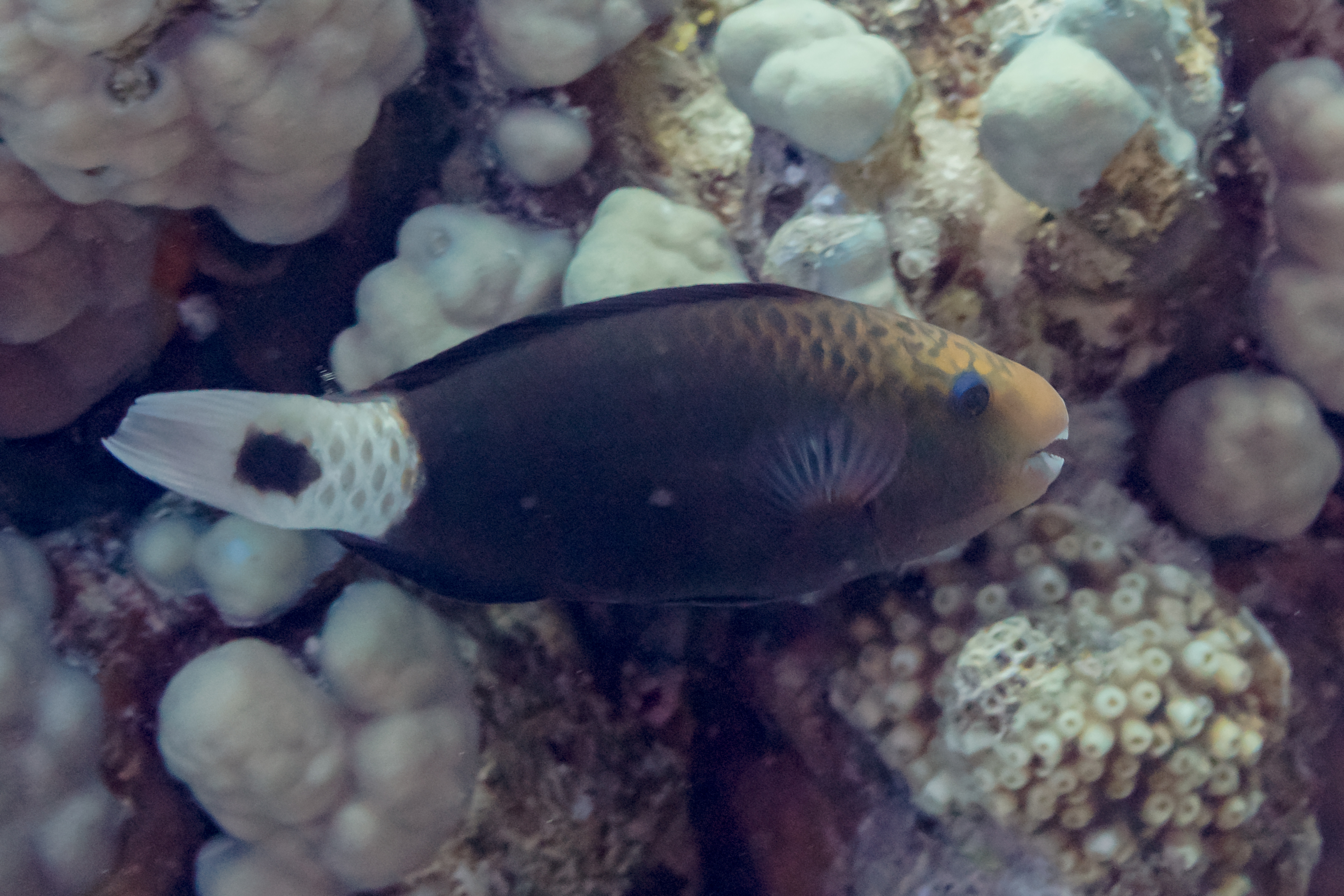
Initial phase, in the Red Sea

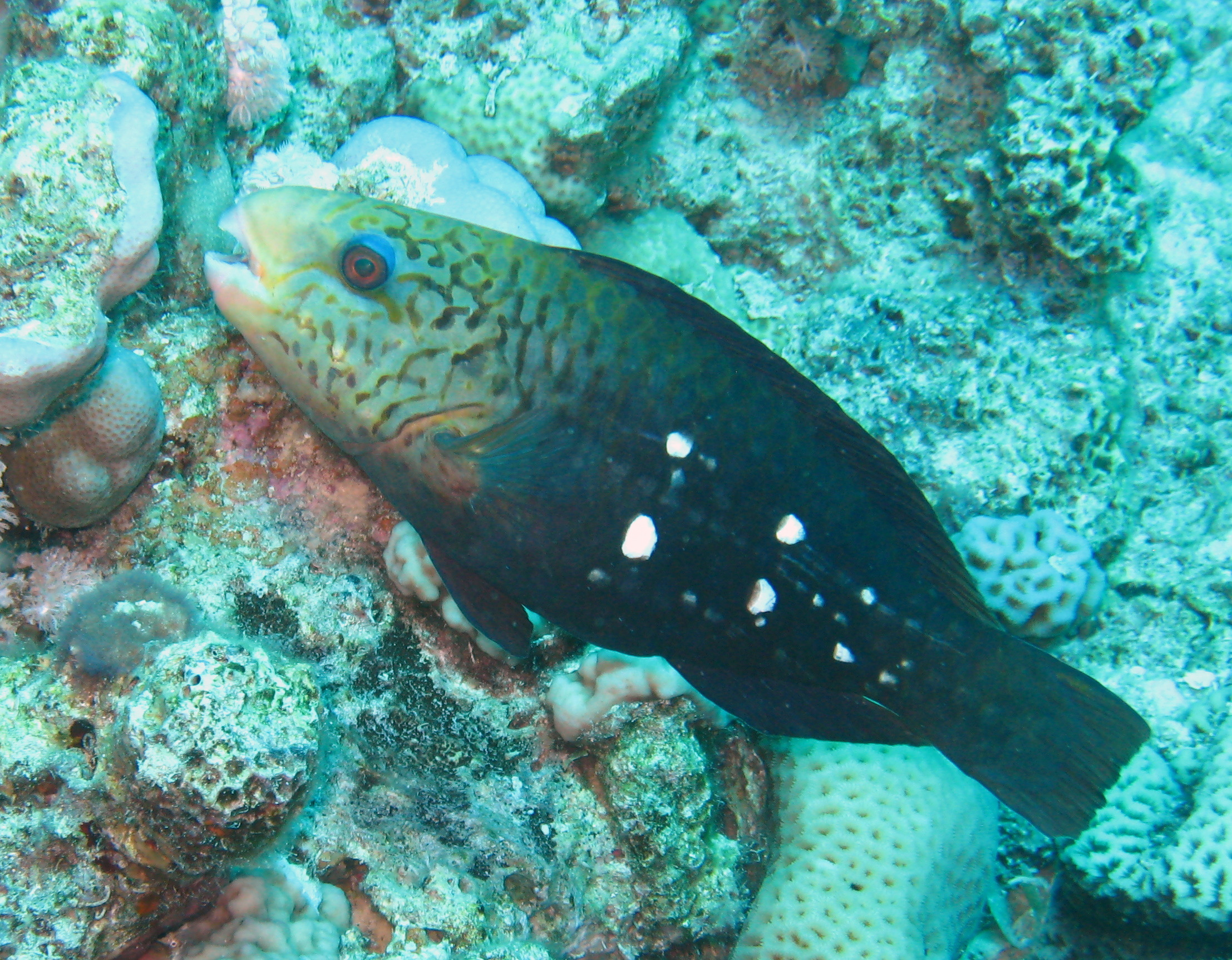
Initial phase, in the Red Sea

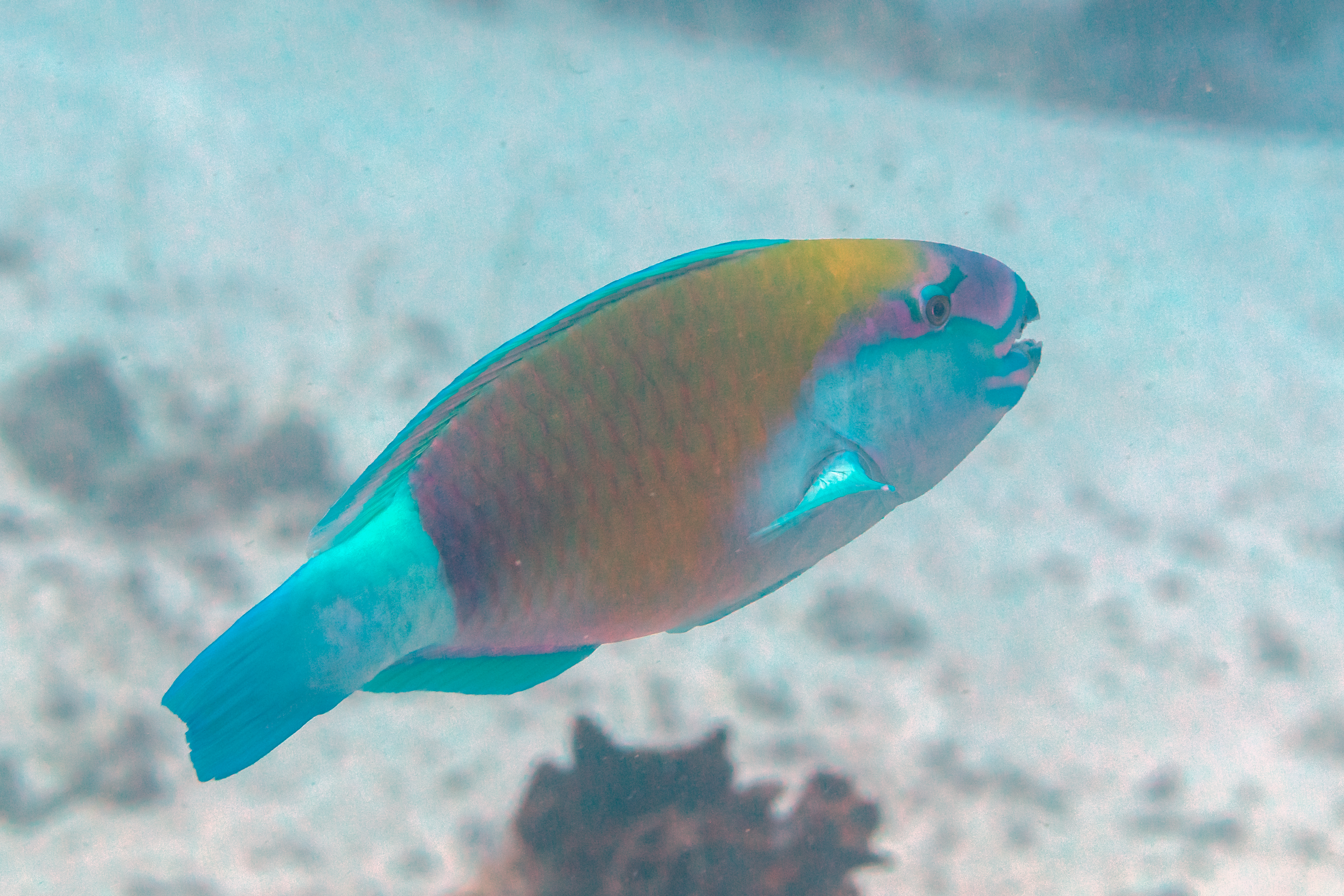
Terminal phase, in Tanzania

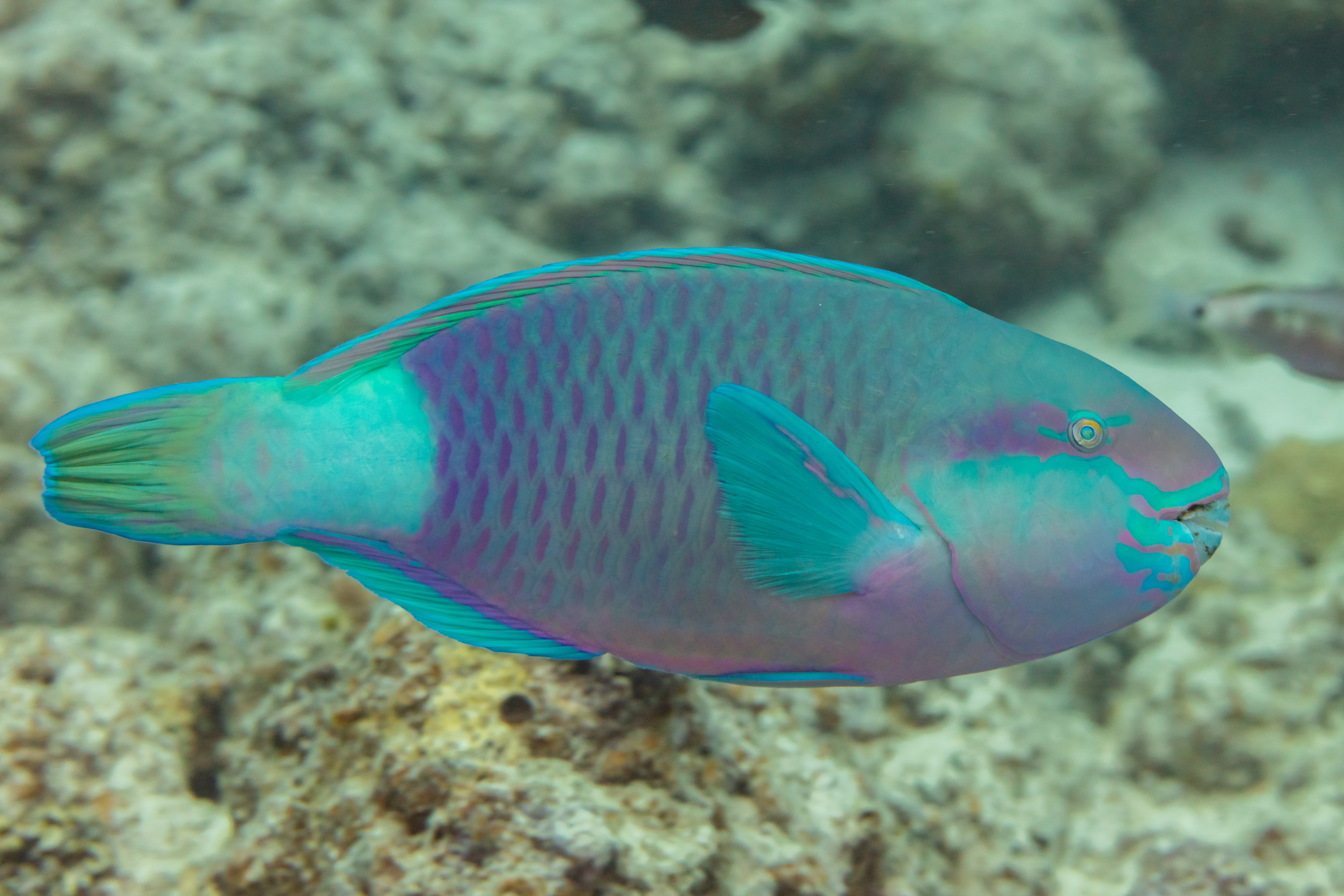
Terminal phase, in Mauritius
