= Desis crosslandi =

Scientific classification
- Domain: Eukaryota
- Kingdom: Animalia
- Phylum: Arthropoda
- Subphylum: Chelicerata
- Class: Arachnida
- Order: Araneae
- Infraorder: Araneomorphae
- Family: Desidae
- Genus: Desis
- Species: D. crosslandi

Binomial name
- Desis crosslandi Pocock, 1903

Species of spider

Desis crosslandi is a species of spider in the genus Desis, and the family Desidae. The species is found on the islands of Zanzibar, Madagascar, Comoros and Mayotte.
