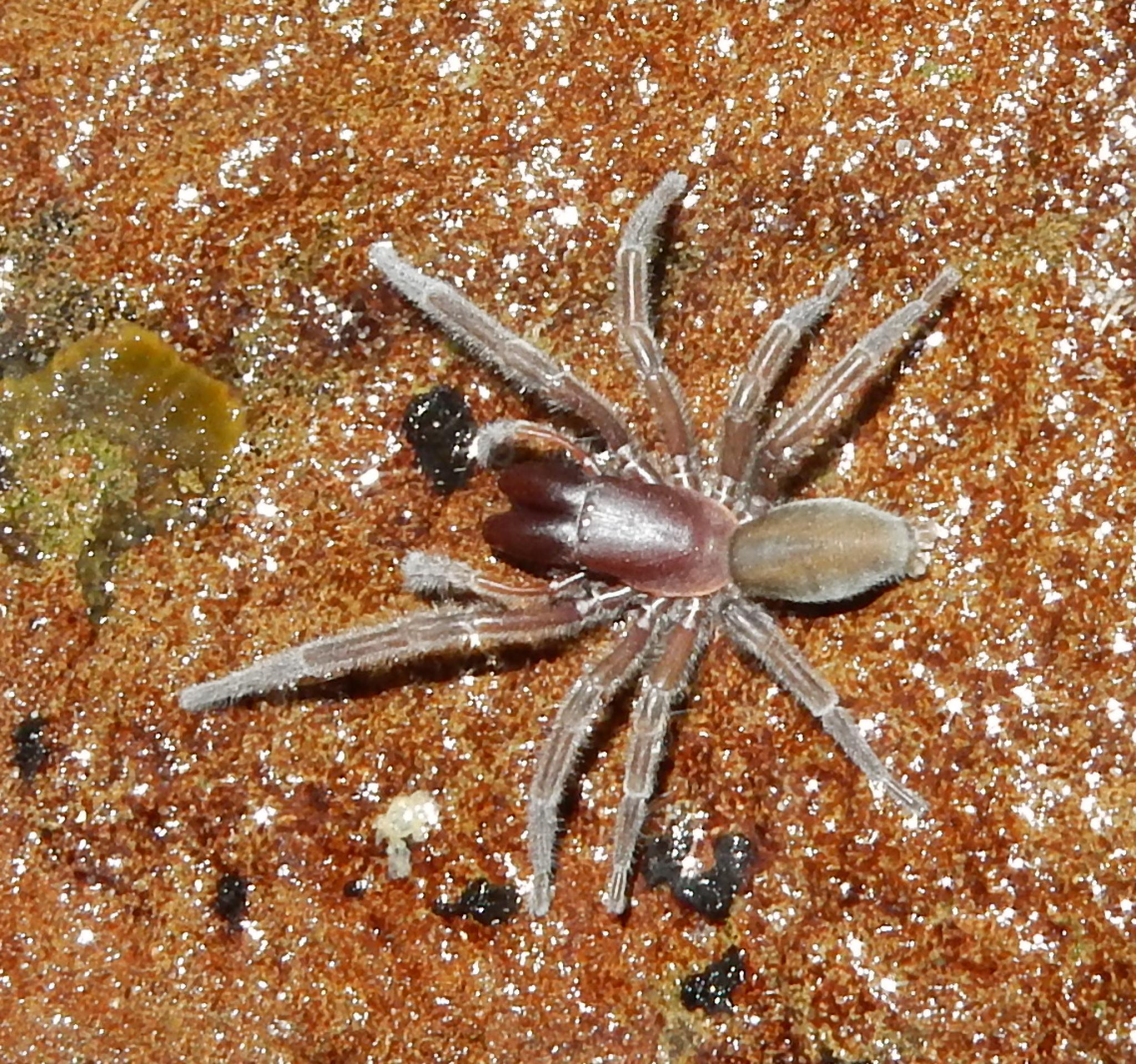
- D. formidabilis from South Africa
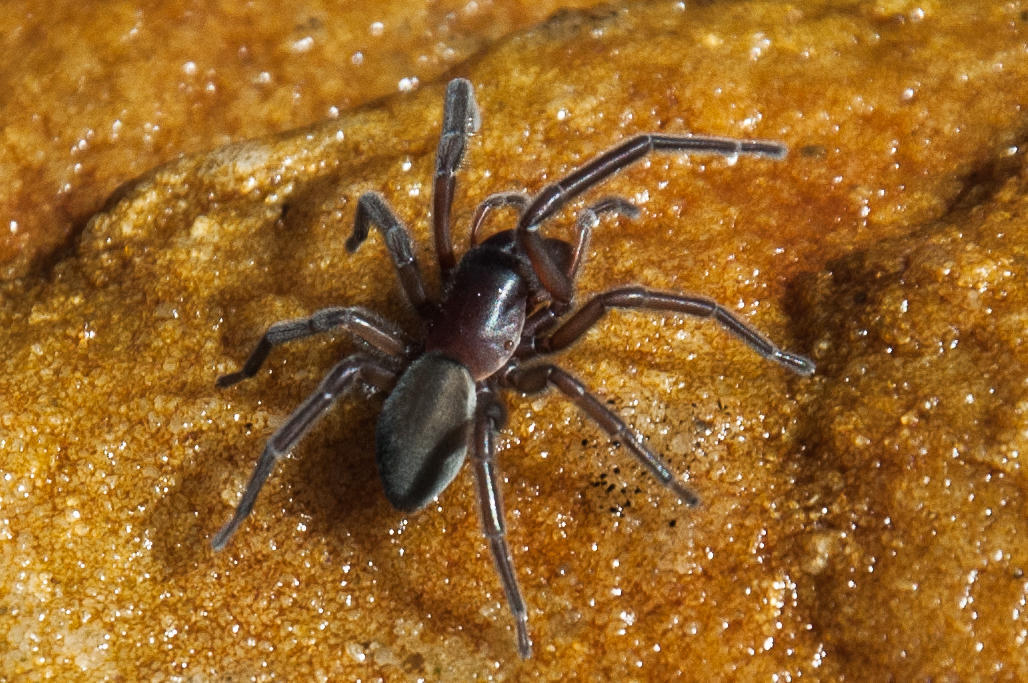

Scientific classification
- Kingdom: Animalia
- Phylum: Arthropoda
- Subphylum: Chelicerata
- Class: Arachnida
- Order: Araneae
- Infraorder: Araneomorphae
- Family: Desidae
- Genus: Desis
- Species: D. formidabilis

Binomial name
- Desis formidabilis (O. Pickard-Cambridge, 1891)

Synonyms
- Robsonia formidabilis O. Pickard-Cambridge, 1891; Paradesis tubicola Pocock, 1898; Desis pentheri Simon, 1910; Desis beckeri Hewitt, 1913

= Desis formidabilis =

Long-Jawed Intertidal Spider

Species of marine spider

Desis formidabilis is a species of spider in the family Desidae. It is endemic to southern Africa, where it inhabits rocky intertidal zones along the coast. The species is commonly known as the long-jawed intertidal spider.

== Taxonomy ==
The species was originally described by Octavius Pickard-Cambridge in 1891 under the genus name Robsonia. It was later transferred to the genus Desis by Eugène Simon in 1897.

Several synonyms have been established through taxonomic revision, including Paradesis tubicola Pocock, 1898, Desis pentheri Simon, 1910, and Desis beckeri Hewitt, 1913.

== Distribution ==
Desis formidabilis is found along the coastlines of Namibia and South Africa. In South Africa, the species has been recorded from the Eastern Cape and Western Cape provinces. Notable localities include Port Alfred, East London, Port Elizabeth, Betty's Bay, Hermanus, Cape Point, and Saldanha Bay.

== Habitat ==
This species is specialized for life in the intertidal zone, inhabiting rocky shores between the low water neap and high water neap tide levels. As a result, it is submerged twice daily for several hours during high tide cycles. The spider constructs retreats in rock crevices and is adapted to the semi-aquatic lifestyle typical of the genus Desis.

== Description ==
Desis formidabilis exhibits sexual size dimorphism, with females being notably larger than males. Adult males measure 9.5 to nearly 15 mm in length (excluding chelicerae), while females including the chelicerae reach 20 mm.

The cephalothorax, chelicerae, labium, maxillae, and sternum are rich liver-colored. The legs and pedipalps are yellow-brown with reddish tinges. The opisthosoma is dull brown. The cephalothorax is slightly longer than the chelicerae, with a broad-oval form that is truncated at the front. The surface is clothed with short, light brownish hairs, but not densely.

The chelicerae are notably long and powerful, projecting forward and curved, with strong teeth on their inner sides. They are furnished with numerous hairs, and the fangs are long, strong, and slightly curved. The eye arrangement follows the typical pattern for the genus, with the posterior median eyes positioned much closer to each other than to the lateral eyes in the same row.

The legs are moderate in length and strength, following the formula I, IV, II, III. They lack spines but are densely clothed with hairs, particularly on the metatarsi and tarsi, which almost form scopulae. The terminal claws are strong, with the superior pair furnished with 6-7 small teeth toward their base.

== Conservation ==
The species is listed as Least Concern on the South African Red List due to its relatively wide distribution range. However, potential threats include oil spills and coastal pollution, which could affect population numbers.
