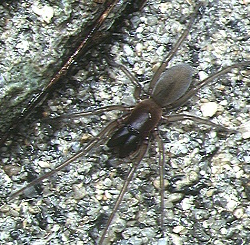
- female Desis japonica
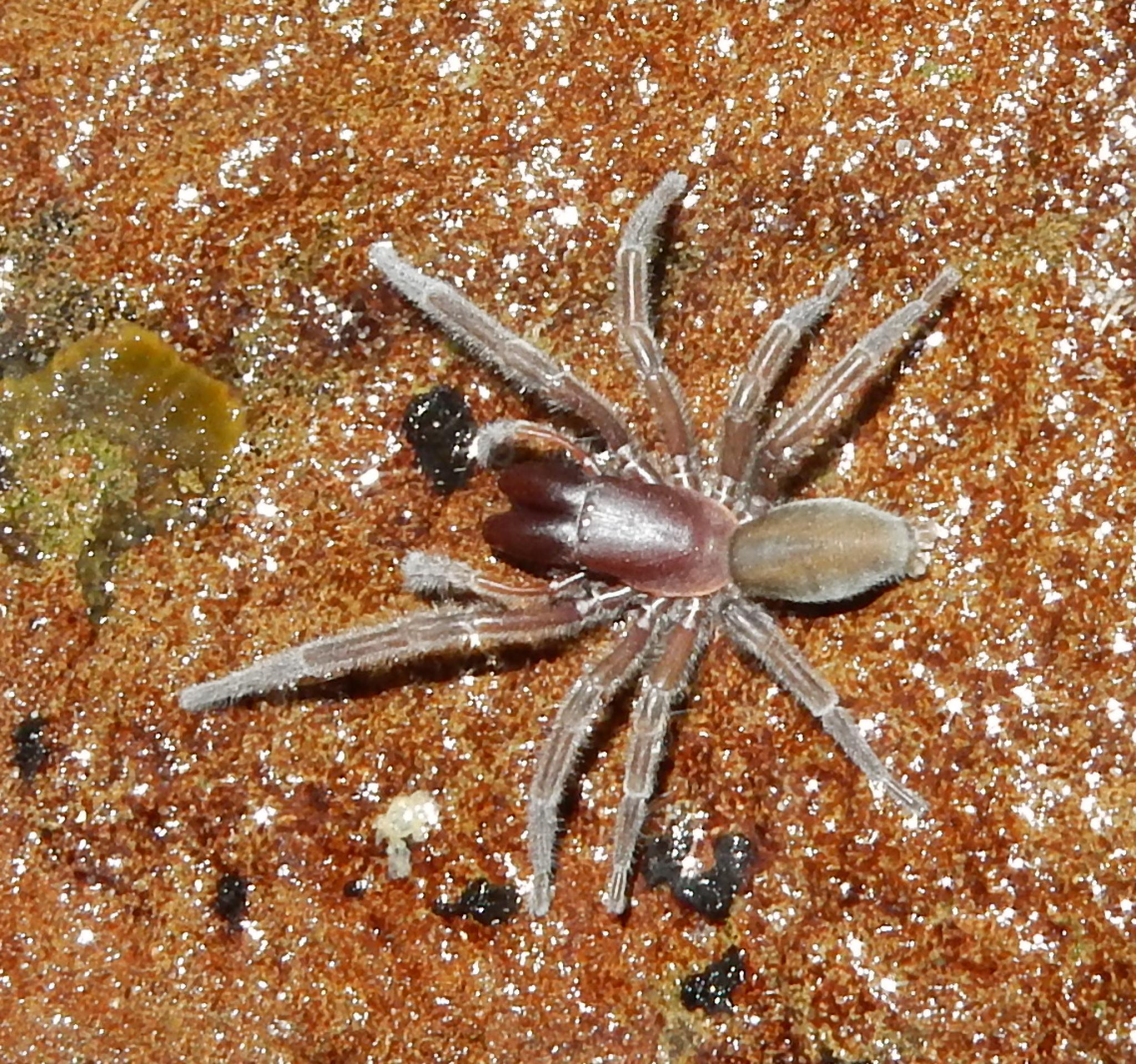
- D. formidabilis

Scientific classification
- Kingdom: Animalia
- Phylum: Arthropoda
- Subphylum: Chelicerata
- Class: Arachnida
- Order: Araneae
- Infraorder: Araneomorphae
- Family: Desidae
- Genus: Desis; Walckenaer, 1837

Type species
- D. maxillosa (Fabricius, 1793)

Species
- 15, see text

= Desis (spider) =

Genus of spiders

Desis is a genus of intertidal spiders that was first described by Charles Athanase Walckenaer in 1837. Species of the genus are found in Australasia, the Pacific, Japan, eastern and southern Africa, and India. They are marine spiders, living in the intertidal zone and only emerging at the ebb tide to hunt for invertebrates including shrimp. When submerged during high tides, they stay in an air chamber sealed with silk, and breathe its air.

== Species ==
As of October 2025, this genus includes fifteen species:

- Desis bobmarleyi Baehr, Raven & Harms, 2017 – Australia (Queensland)
- Desis crosslandi Pocock, 1903 – Tanzania (Zanzibar), Madagascar, Comoros, Mayotte
- Desis formidabilis (O. Pickard-Cambridge, 1891) – Namibia, South Africa
- Desis galapagoensis Hirst, 1925 – Galapagos
- Desis gardineri Pocock, 1904 – India (Laccadive Is.)
- Desis inermis Gravely, 1927 – India
- Desis japonica Yaginuma, 1956 – Japan
- Desis jiaxiangi Lin, Li & Chen, 2020 – China
- Desis kenyonae Pocock, 1902 – Australia (Victoria, Tasmania)
- Desis marina (Hector, 1878) – New Caledonia, New Zealand (mainland, Chatham Is.)
- Desis martensi L. Koch, 1872 – Singapore, Indonesia (Java)
- Desis maxillosa (Fabricius, 1793) – New Guinea, New Caledonia (type species)
- Desis risbeci Berland, 1931 – New Caledonia
- Desis tangana Roewer, 1955 – East Africa
- Desis vorax L. Koch, 1872 – Samoa
