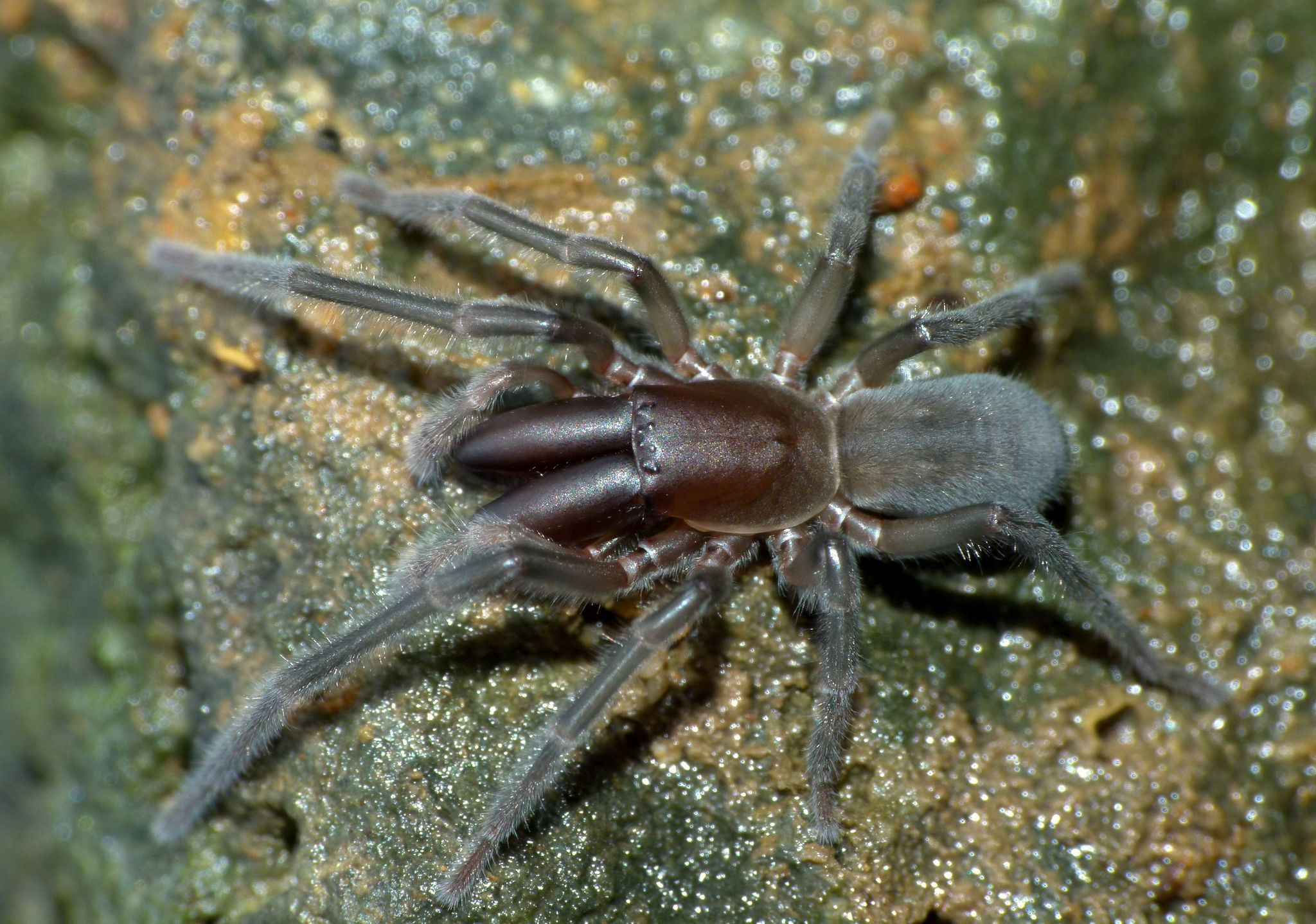

Conservation status
- Not Threatened (NZ TCS)

Scientific classification
- Kingdom: Animalia
- Phylum: Arthropoda
- Subphylum: Chelicerata
- Class: Arachnida
- Order: Araneae
- Infraorder: Araneomorphae
- Family: Desidae
- Genus: Desis
- Species: D. marina

Binomial name
- Desis marina (Hector, 1878)

Synonyms
- Dandridgea dysderoides White, 1849; Argyroneta marina Hector, 1877; Desis robsoni Powell, 1879; Robsonia marina Hector, 1877; Desis marinus Pocock, 1895

= Desis marina =

Intertidal spider

Species of spider

Desis marina, also known as the intertidal spider or marine spider, is a species of Desidae found in New Zealand and New Caledonia. It was first described by naturalist James Hector in 1878 from specimens found at Cape Campbell. The spider is over 8 mm in length, with very large chelicerae (fang-like structures), a red-brown cephalothorax (head region) and a creamy grey abdomen. It occurs exclusively on rocky shores where it lives in the intertidal zone. In this zone it lives in silk retreats built inside seashells, crevices and bull kelp holdfasts. It is capable of surviving complete submergence in these silk retreats for over 19 days (which is supported by its lower respiration rate). Like all spiders, it is a predator and feeds upon invertebrates such as amphipods and isopods. The females usually produce several egg sacs (around September to January) which the female guards in her silk retreat and hatch by May. The females can potentially live for up to two years. The silk of D. marina is adapted for aquatic environments. Under the New Zealand Threat Classification System, it is considered "Not Threatened".

== Taxonomy ==
Previously, specimens of Desis marina had been misidentified as Dandrigea dysderoides in 1849. In 1877, it was initially described as Argyroneta marina by naturalist James Hector, although a lighthouse keeper detailed observations of its biology. The first record of D. marina was from Cape Campbell in Marlborough (where the lighthouse keeper was working). It was independently described again in 1879 as Desis robsoni, but this was later recognised to be a synonym. Then, in 1880, English arachnologist Octavius Pickard-Cambridge transferred A. marina to the Robsonia genus. Robsonia marina was later transferred to the genus Desis and therefore renamed as Desis marinus in 1895. However, Desis is feminine, so the name was corrected to Desis marina. D. marina was most recently redescribed in 1970 by New Zealand arachnologist Ray Forster. Presently there are no type specimens (none were ever designated by Hector) for this species. They are commonly referred to as "marine spiders" or "intertidal spiders".

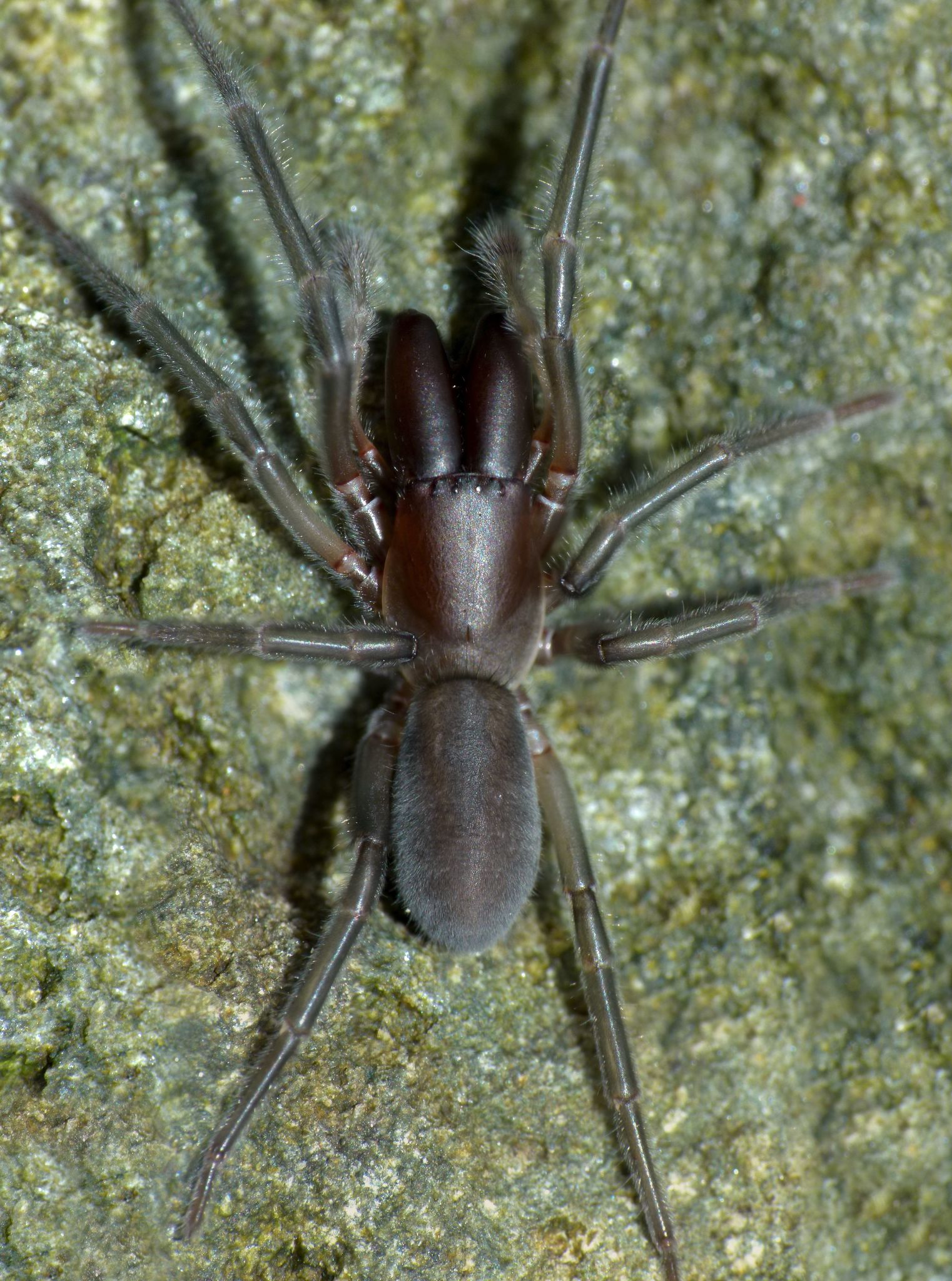
Desis marina upper view.

== Description ==
The males of Desis marina are over 8 mm in length. The cephalothorax (fused head and thorax region) and chelicerae (fang-like structures) are coloured dark red-brown, while the abdomen is creamy grey that is almost greenish. The carapace (upper section of the cephalothorax) is almost rectangular in shape and has eight small eyes in two rows. These eyes form a group that occupies just over half the width of the head. The sternum (underside of the cephalothorax) is longer than wide and has projections on the lateral margins. These projects occur opposite of and between the coxae, the base segment of the legs. Proportionally, the chelicerae are very large and have two rows of teeth. Small pale hairs cover the abdomen with some long hairs present throughout it. For the pedipalp (leg like appendages that males use for mating), the cymbium (segment at end of the pedipalp) is pointed distally and extends past the bulb whilst the tibial apophysis (projection of the third pedipalp segment) consists of a flat plate and spine.

The females are similar to the males but are generally larger (reaching over 10 mm in length) and have proportionally smaller chelicerae. This species is notable for its complex branched tracheal systems which is positioned just in front of the spinnerets. It has been noted that there are some differences in morphology between populations.

== Distribution and habitat ==
D. marina is native to New Zealand (including the Chatham Islands) and New Caledonia. Within New Zealand, it is widespread and seemingly occur wherever there is suitable habitat. It lives in the intertidal zone of rocky shores, where it builds silk retreats in crevices, seashells, tubeworm burrows, and bull kelp holdfasts, which it seals shut after entering. In these environments, the spiders and their silk retreats are regularly submerged in seawater. They are most active at night, but are sometimes seen during daytime.

== Diet ==
Like all spiders, D. marina is a carnivore. It is known to emerge and feed during low tide, eating amphipods, isopods and other small invertebrates. D. marina spiders have also been recorded killing small fish. Although they sometimes actively hunt prey, they are typically "sit and wait" predators.

== Life history ==
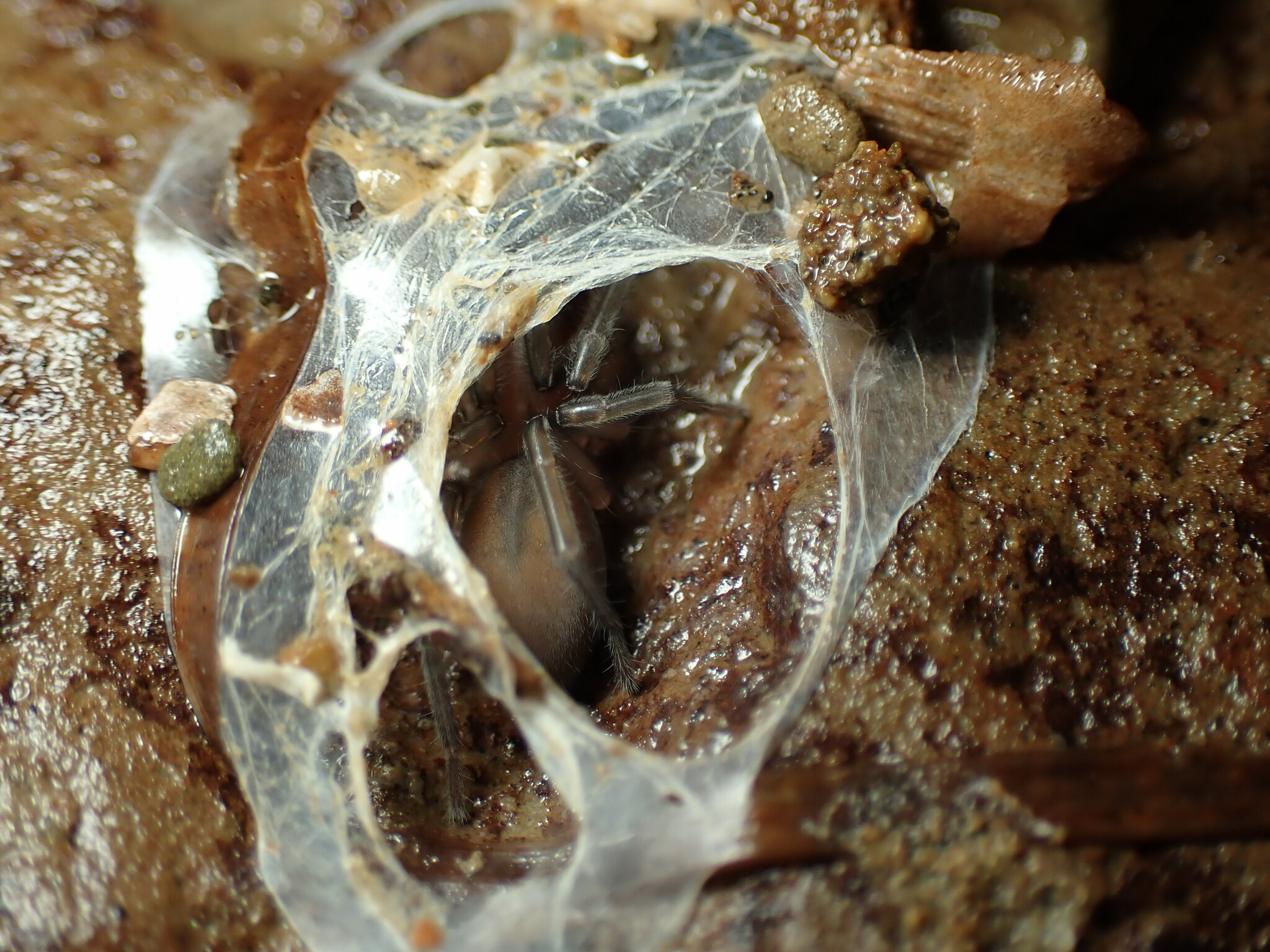
Desis marina in torn silken retreat.

Desis marina can live in nests alone and in groups, although living alone is more common. They've been found cohabiting kelp holdfasts in pairs and in larger groups. When males and females were cohabiting a nest, they tend to be roughly of the same size. Females reproduce yearly. Eggs are laid in the female's retreat from September to January, with a recruitment period between March and April. All spiders are hatched by May. The females produce an average of 3.4 egg sacs with the number of eggs per sac being higher with bigger females. The egg sacs on average contain 27.5 eggs. Egg development takes roughly two months. After hatching, the juveniles first moult takes place within the egg sac (this moult occurs after roughly 23 days). Juveniles remain in the female's retreat for another two months (the time required for the first two instars to develop). The silk of the egg sac is very tough and it has been assumed that the female needs to rip it open to let the spiderlings out. It takes juveniles roughly 4–5 months to reach maturity. Although they mature around the same time, females live longer than males. Females can potentially live for up to two years, so may be able to reproduce a second clutch of eggs.

== Physiology ==
When in its silk retreat, Desis marina may be submerged for up to 19 days, although this depends on the depth at which the spider is nesting. To aid in surviving this long underwater, D. marina has a lower respiration rate than terrestrial spiders of similar size, which enables it to survive on the small amount of air in its retreat. Aside from this lower respiration rate, there are no other respiratory adaptations, and, when submerged, it gets sufficient air from that contained in its nest. In the nest, 3 to 10% of required oxygen is diffused through the silk.

Silk retreats are made using two types of fibres, each of a different thickness. D. marina spidroin (proteins that build silk) DNA sequences had higher concentrations of hydrophobic amino acid motifs (amino acid sequence patterns) when compared to that of terrestrial spiders, which may be an adaptation to support silk in aquatic environments.

Like all spiders, D. marina is capable of injecting venom with its bite. There is a single record of a dog being bitten on the foot by D. marina. The bite caused swelling and seemingly paralysed the foot for several hours. It is possible that the spider could bite humans if provoked.

== Conservation status ==
Under the New Zealand Threat Classification System, this species is listed as "Not Threatened" with the qualifiers of "Climate Impact" and "Secure Overseas". It is considered vulnerable to climate change because sea level changes may impact its coastal habitat.
