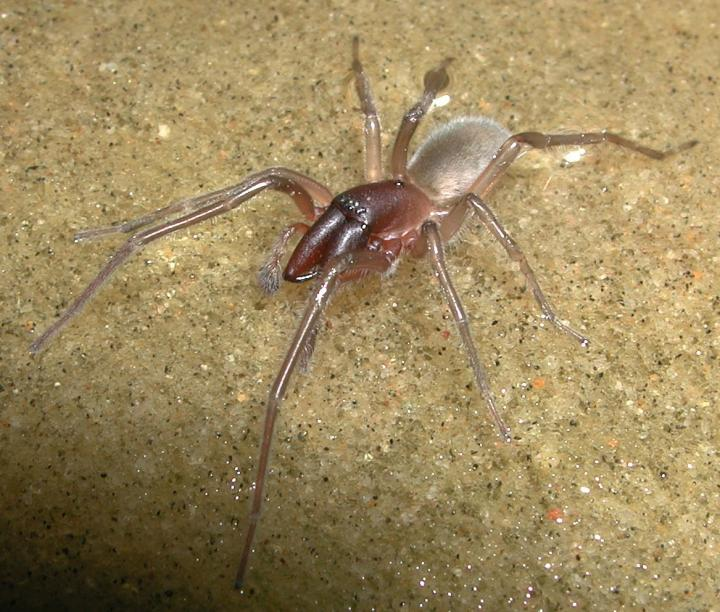
- D. bobmarleyi male holotype

Scientific classification
- Kingdom: Animalia
- Phylum: Arthropoda
- Subphylum: Chelicerata
- Class: Arachnida
- Order: Araneae
- Infraorder: Araneomorphae
- Family: Desidae
- Genus: Desis
- Species: D. bobmarleyi

Binomial name
- Desis bobmarleyi Baehr, Raven, and Harms, 2017

= Desis bobmarleyi =

Species of arachnid

Desis bobmarleyi is an underwater spider species found in the shores of north eastern Queensland, Australia. It is known to build air chambers from silk. D. bobmarleyi is named in honour of the Jamaican singer-songwriter Bob Marley. As an intertidal species the name was inspired by Marley's song "High Tide or Low Tide". In April 2018 the World Register of Marine Species named it one of the top 10 most remarkable species discovered in 2017. The spider is an araneomorph. D. bobmarleyi is a recent discovery, which is important to note when examining its data. Additionally, because it is part of the genus Desis, it is considered a fully aquatic animal which is interesting because of its evolutionary history. The trnL2 and trnN genes, which are seen in marine spiders that are a part of the genus, must have experienced some kind of rearrangement that allowed for the development of its current traits. The long hairs on its legs and abdomen trap an air bubble which allows it to breathe while submerged.

== See also ==
- Gnathia marleyi
- List of organisms named after famous people (born 1925–1949)
