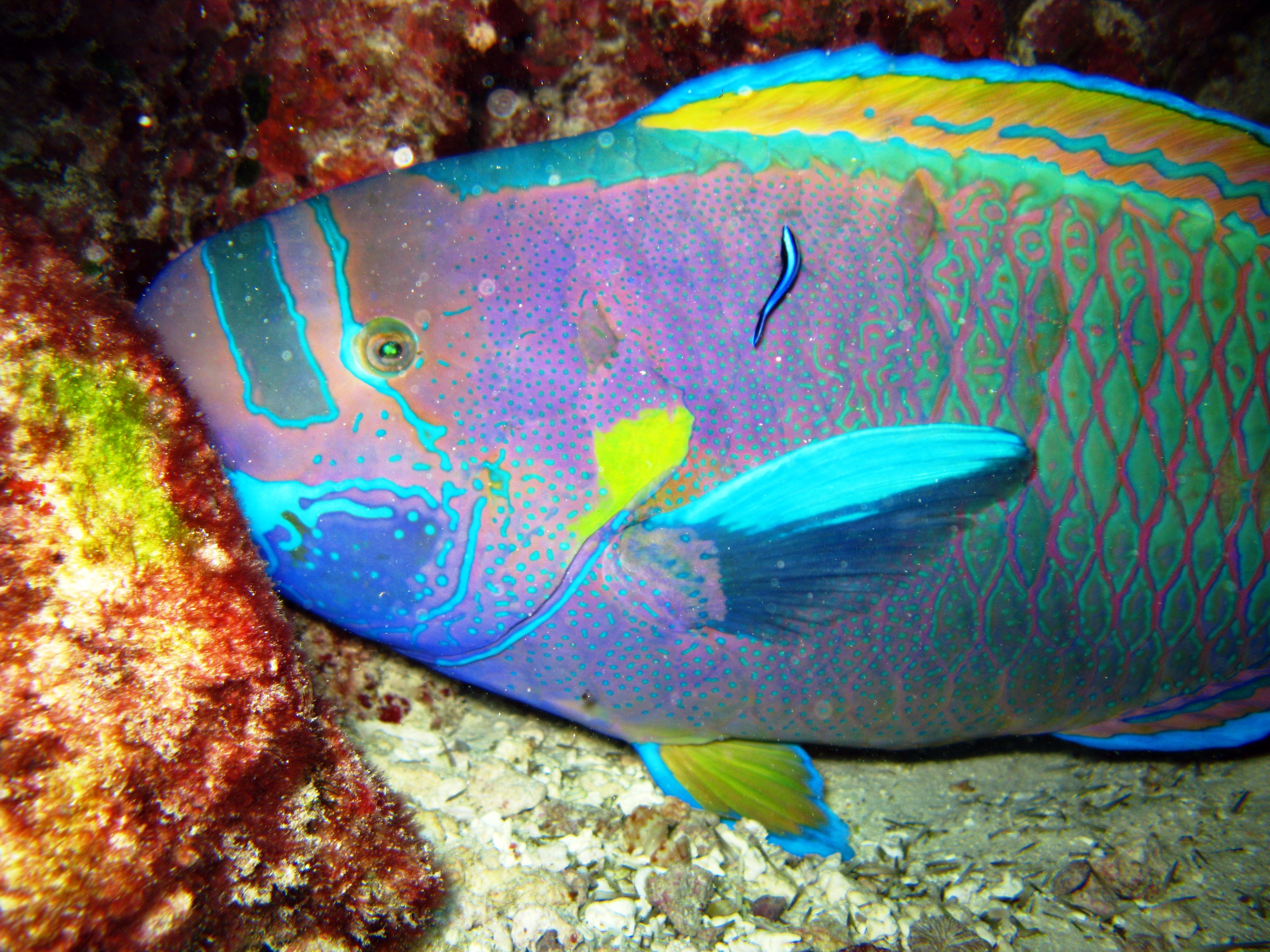
- Terminal phase
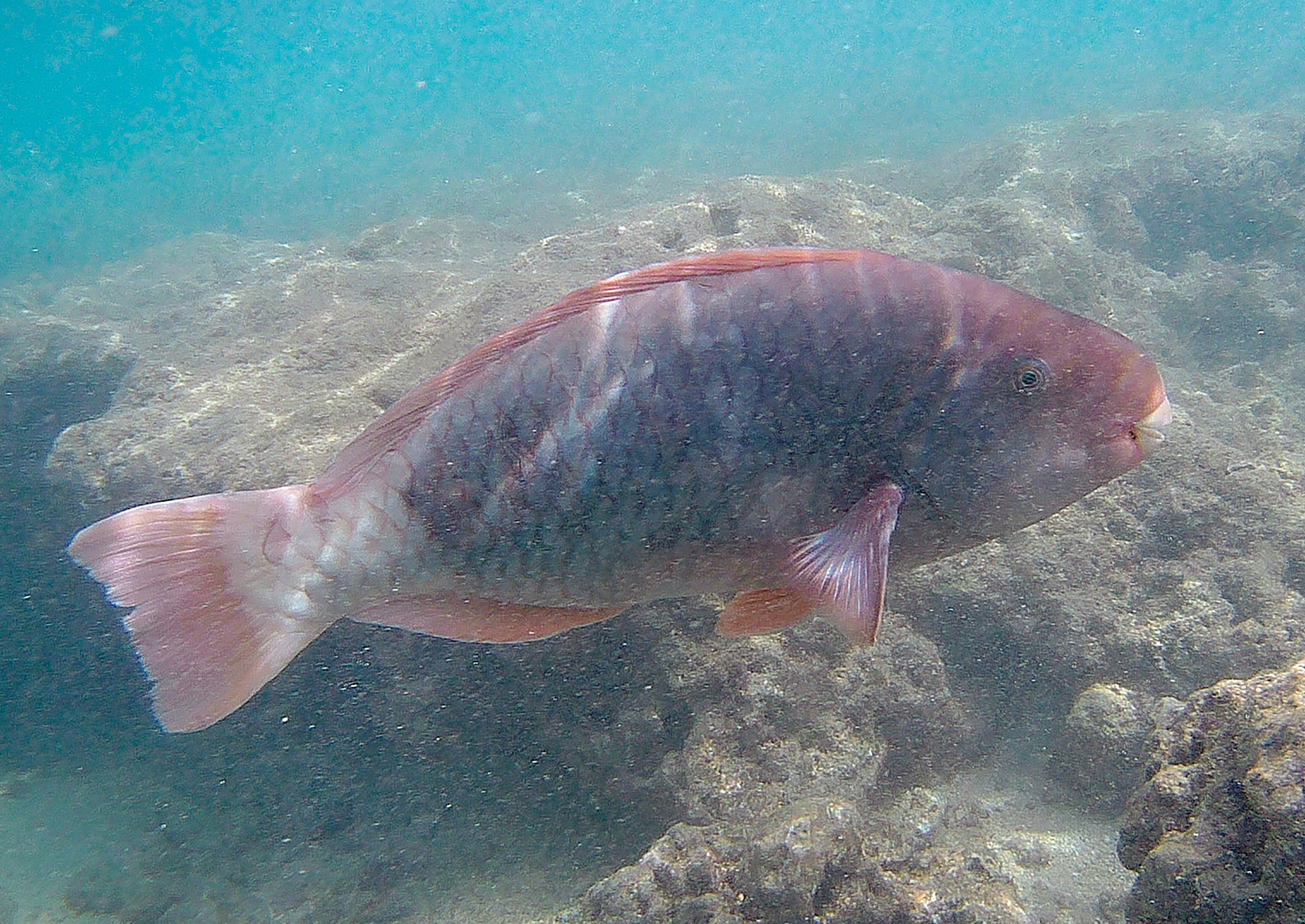
- Initial phase

Conservation status
- Least Concern (IUCN 3.1)

Scientific classification
- Kingdom: Animalia
- Phylum: Chordata
- Class: Actinopterygii
- Division: Teleostei
- Order: Labriformes
- Family: Labridae
- Genus: Chlorurus
- Species: C. perspicillatus

Binomial name
- Chlorurus perspicillatus (Steindachner, 1879)

Synonyms
- Scarus perspicillatus Steindachner, 1879; Scarus ahula Jenkins, 1901

= Chlorurus perspicillatus =

Species of ray-finned fishes

Chlorurus perspicillatus, known officially by the English name, spectacled parrotfish, given by professional ichthyologists and Ichthyology or uhu-uliuli as a well-established Hawaiian name for many hundreds of years, is a species of marine fish in the family Scaridae. Found only in the Eastern Central Pacific Hawaiian Islands, it inhabits lagoons and seaward reefs

== Description ==
This species can reach 30 centimeters (1 foot) in length and has a blunt oval-shaped head, square tail, and smooth jaws. The species vary in color with males being primarily blue with thin bright pink scale edges that layer the head, while females are dark purple-grey in color with red fins and a white section on the tail where it meets the rest of the body. These fish commonly start life as female and transition to male over the span of their lives, which usually brings along a color or pattern change.

Young fish are brown with white dots and three white stripes and can reach a maximum size of 24 inches length when fully grown.

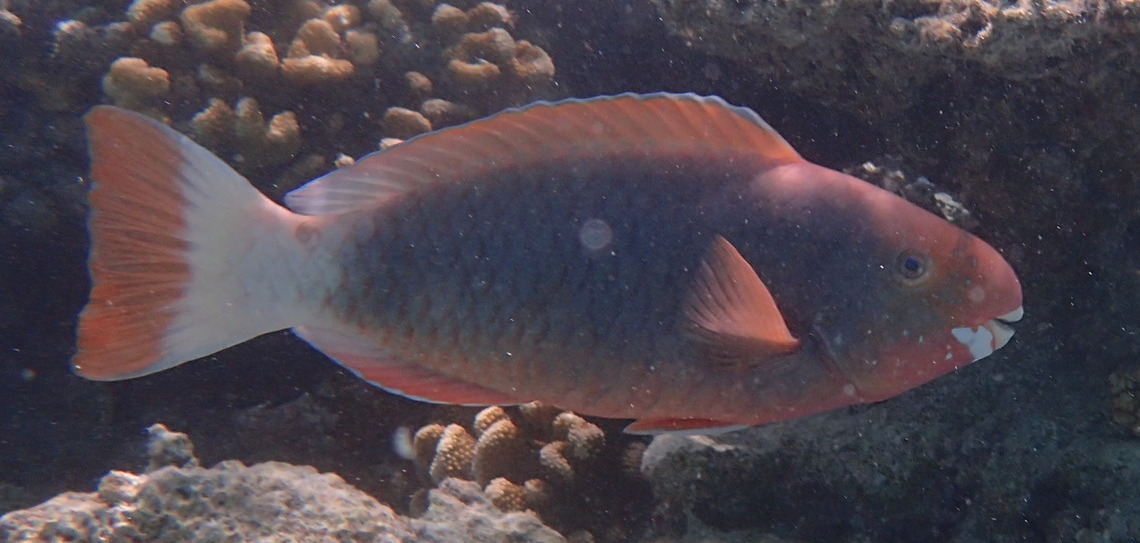
Initial phase

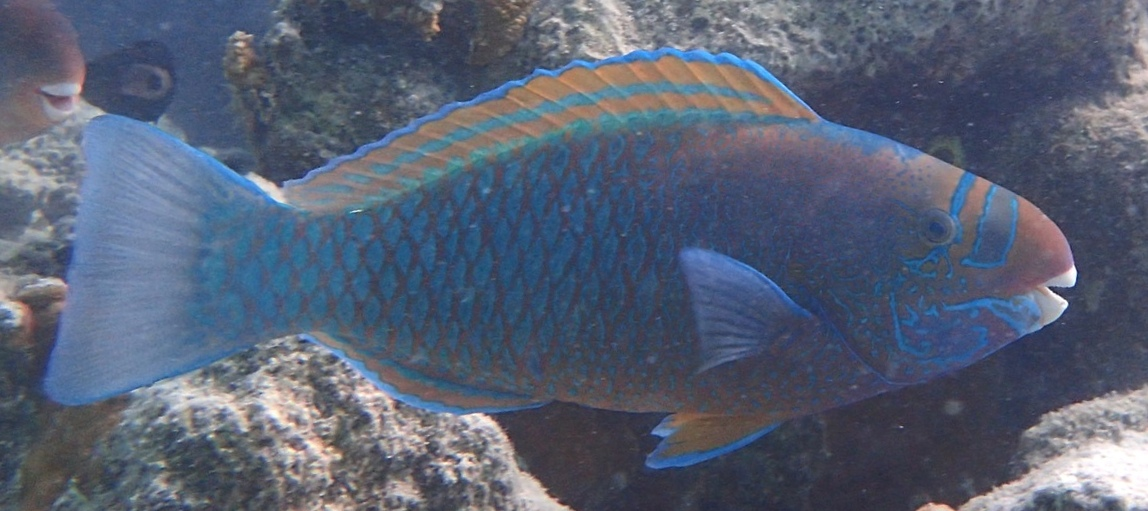
Terminal phase

== Biology ==
The spectacled parrotfish inhabits coral and seaward reefs to depths of 60 meters. They help maintain the health of coral reefs by their herbivorous diet of algae, keeping it from overgrowing. Unlike other species of parrotfish, the spectacled parrotfish tend to stay independent or are sometimes found in small groups.

It has been known to hybridize with Chlorurus sordidus.

They have been recorded living for up to 18 years.

== Conservation status ==
This species is endemic to Hawaii. They currently face a recreational and commercial overfishing threat which has declined their population in the Hawaiian Islands.
