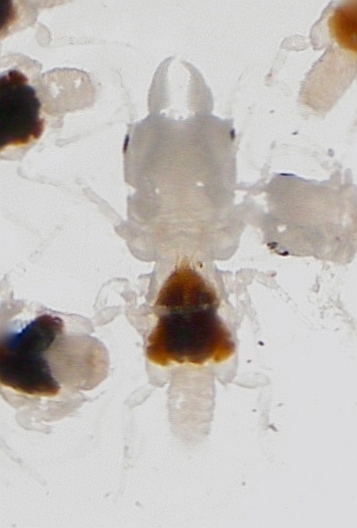
- Gnathia marleyi

Scientific classification
- Kingdom: Animalia
- Phylum: Arthropoda
- Class: Malacostraca
- Order: Isopoda
- Family: Gnathiidae
- Genus: Gnathia; Leach, 1814

Type species
- Gnathia maxillaris (Montagu, 1804)

= Gnathia =

Genus of crustaceans

Gnathia is a genus of isopod crustaceans, containing the following species:

- Gnathia africana Barnard, 1914
- Gnathia albescens Hansen, 1916
- Gnathia alces Monod, 1926
- Gnathia andrei Pires, 1996
- Gnathia antarctica (Studer, 1883)
- Gnathia antonbruunae Kensley, Schotte & Poore, 2009
- Gnathia arabica Schotte, 1995
- Gnathia arctica Gurjanova, 1929
- Gnathia asperifrons Holdich & Harrison, 1980
- Gnathia aureola Stebbing, 1900
- Gnathia aureumaculosa Ferreiera, Smit, Grutter & Davies, 2009
- Gnathia barnardi Smit & Basson, 2002
- Gnathia beethoveni Paul & Menzies, 1971
- Gnathia bengalensis Kumari, Hanumantha, Rao & Shyamasundari, 1993
- Gnathia biorbis Holdich & Harrison, 1980
- Gnathia brachyuropus Monod, 1926
- Gnathia brucei George, 2003
- Gnathia bungoensis Nunomura, 1982
- Gnathia calamitosa Monod, 1926
- Gnathia calmani Monod, 1926
- Gnathia calsi Mueller, 1993
- Gnathia camponotus Cohen & Poore, 1994
- Gnathia camuripenis Tanaka, 2004
- Gnathia capillata Nunomura, 2004
- Gnathia cerina (Stimpson, 1853)
- Gnathia clementensis Schultz, 1966
- Gnathia cooki Mueller, 1989
- Gnathia coralmaris Svavarsson & Bruce, 2012
- Gnathia cornuta Holdich & Harrison, 1980
- Gnathia coronadoensis Schultz, 1966
- Gnathia cryptopais Barnard, 1925
- Gnathia dentata (G. O. Sars, 1872)
- Gnathia derzhavini Gurjanova, 1933
- Gnathia disjuncta Barnard, 1920
- Gnathia epopstruma Cohen & Poore, 1994
- Gnathia eumeces Kensley, Schotte & Poore, 2009
- Gnathia excavata Ota, 2012
- Gnathia falcipenis Holdich & Harrison, 1980
- Gnathia fallax Monod, 1926
- Gnathia firingae Mueller, 1991
- Gnathia fragilis Schultz, 1977
- Gnathia glauca Kensley, Schotte & Poore, 2009
- Gnathia gonzalezi Mueller, 1988
- Gnathia grandilaris Coetzee, Smit, Grutter & Davies, 2008
- Gnathia grutterae M. Ferreira, N. Smit & A. Davies, 2010
- Gnathia gurjanovae Golovan, 2006
- Gnathia halei Cals, 1973
- Gnathia hamletgast Svavarsson & Bruce, 2012
- Gnathia hemingwayi Ortiz & Lalana, 1997
- Gnathia hirayamai Nunomura, 1992
- Gnathia hirsuta Schultz, 1966
- Gnathia illepidus (Wagner, 1869)
- Gnathia incana Menzies & George, 1972
- Gnathia indoinsularis Svavarsson & Jorundsdottir, 2004
- Gnathia inopinata Monod, 1925
- Gnathia iridomyrmex Cohen & Poore, 1994
- Gnathia jimmybuffetti Erasmus, Hadfield, Sikkel, and Smit, 2023
- Gnathia johanna Monod, 1926
- Gnathia kumejimensis Ota, 2012
- Gnathia lacunacapitalis Menzies & George, 1972
- Gnathia latidens (Beddard, 1886)
- Gnathia lignophila Mueller, 1993
- Gnathia limicola Ota, Tanaka & Hirose, 2007
- Gnathia luxata Kensley, Schotte & Poore, 2009
- Gnathia maculosa Y. Ota & E. Hirose, 2009
- Gnathia magdalenensis Mueller, 1988
- Gnathia malaysiensis Mueller, 1993
- Gnathia margaritarum Monod, 1926
- Gnathia marionis Svavarsson & Bruce, 2012
- Gnathia marleyi Farquharson, Smit & Sikkel, 2012
- Gnathia masca Farquharson et al., 2012
- Gnathia maxillaris (Montagu, 1804)
- Gnathia meticola Holdich & Harrison, 1980
- Gnathia micheli Ortiz, Winfield & Varela, 2012
- Gnathia mulieraria Hale, 1924
- Gnathia mutsuensis Nunomura, 2004
- Gnathia mystrium Cohen & Poore, 1994
- Gnathia nicembola Mueller, 1989
- Gnathia nkulu Smit & Van As, 2000
- Gnathia notostigma Cohen & Poore, 1994
- Gnathia nubila Ota & Hirose, 2009
- Gnathia odontomachus Cohen & Poore, 1994
- Gnathia oxyuraea (Lilljeborg, 1855)
- Gnathia panousei Daguerre de Hureaux, 1971
- Gnathia pantherina Smit & Basson, 2002
- Gnathia perimulica Monod, 1926
- Gnathia phallonajopsis Monod, 1925
- Gnathia philogona Monod, 1926
- Gnathia pilosus Hadfield, Smit & Avenant-Oldewage, 2008
- Gnathia piscivora Paperna & Por, 1977
- Gnathia productatridens Menzies & Barnard, 1959
- Gnathia prolasius Cohen & Poore, 1994
- Gnathia puertoricensis Menzies & Glynn, 1968
- Gnathia rathi Kensley, 1984
- Gnathia rectifrons Gurjanova, 1933
- Gnathia rhytidoponera Cohen & Poore, 1994
- Gnathia ricardoi Pires, 1996
- Gnathia samariensis Mueller, 1988
- Gnathia sanrikuensis Nunomura, 1998
- Gnathia scabra Ota, 2012
- Gnathia schmidti Gurjanova, 1933
- Gnathia serrula Kensley, Schotte & Poore, 2009
- Gnathia serrulatifrons Monod, 1926
- Gnathia sifae Svavarsson, 2006
- Gnathia somalia Kensley, Schotte & Poore, 2009
- Gnathia spongicola Barnard, 1920
- Gnathia steveni Menzies, 1962
- Gnathia stigmacros Cohen & Poore, 1994
- Gnathia stoddarti Kensley, Schotte & Poore, 2009
- Gnathia taprobanensis Monod, 1926
- Gnathia teissieri Cals, 1972
- Gnathia teruyukiae Ota, 2011
- Gnathia tridens Menzies & Barnard, 1959
- Gnathia trilobata Schultz, 1966
- Gnathia trimaculata Coetzee, Smit, Grutter & Davies, 2009
- Gnathia triospathiona Boone, 1918
- Gnathia tuberculata Richardson, 1909
- Gnathia tuberculosa (Beddard, 1886)
- Gnathia ubatuba Pires, 1996
- Gnathia varanus Svavarsson & Bruce, 2012
- Gnathia variobranchia Holdich & Harrison, 1980
- Gnathia vellosa Mueller, 1988
- Gnathia venusta Monod, 1925
- Gnathia virginalis Monod, 1926
- Gnathia vorax (Lucas, 1849)
- Gnathia wagneri Monod, 1925
- Gnathia wisteri Svavarsson & Bruce, 2012
- Gnathia zanzibarensis Kensley, Schotte & Poore, 2009
