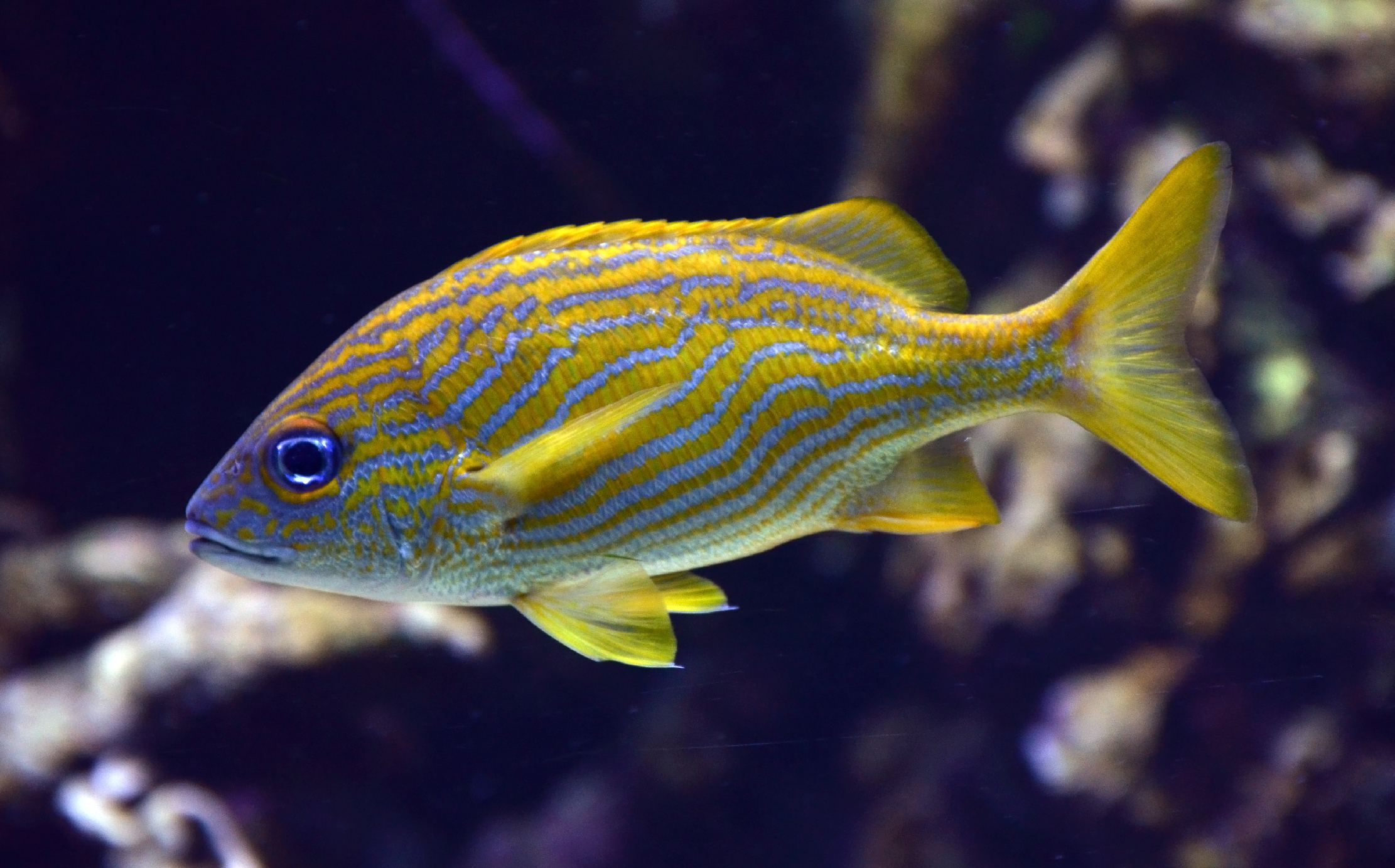

Conservation status
- Least Concern (IUCN 3.1)

Scientific classification
- Kingdom: Animalia
- Phylum: Chordata
- Class: Actinopterygii
- Order: Acanthuriformes
- Family: Haemulidae
- Genus: Haemulon
- Species: H. flavolineatum

Binomial name
- Haemulon flavolineatum (Desmarest, 1823)

Synonyms
- Diabasis flavolineatus Desmarest, 1823

= Haemulon flavolineatum =

Species of fish

Haemulon flavolineatum, the French grunt, banana grunt, gold laced grunt, open-mouthed grunt, redmouth grunt, or yellow grunt, is a species of marine ray-finned fish, a grunt belonging to the family Haemulidae. It inhabits tropical through warm-temperate regions between the southern Caribbean and the southeast U.S., within the western Atlantic Ocean.

== Taxonomy ==
H. flavolineatum was first formally described in 1823 as Diabasis flavolineatus by French zoologist Anselme Gaëtan Desmarest (1784–1838), with the type locality given as Cuba. The specific name is a compound of the Latin flavo meaning "yellow" and lineatum meaning "lined", a reference to the yellow stripes on the flanks.

== Distribution ==
H. flavolineatum is found in the western Atlantic Ocean from South Carolina and Bermuda in the north, along the coast of the United States to the Bahamas, into the southern Gulf of Mexico including the Florida Keys, from Tuxpan in Mexico eastwards along the northern coast of the Yucatan Peninsula to northwestern Cuba, and south into the Caribbean Sea as far as Trinidad.

== Description ==
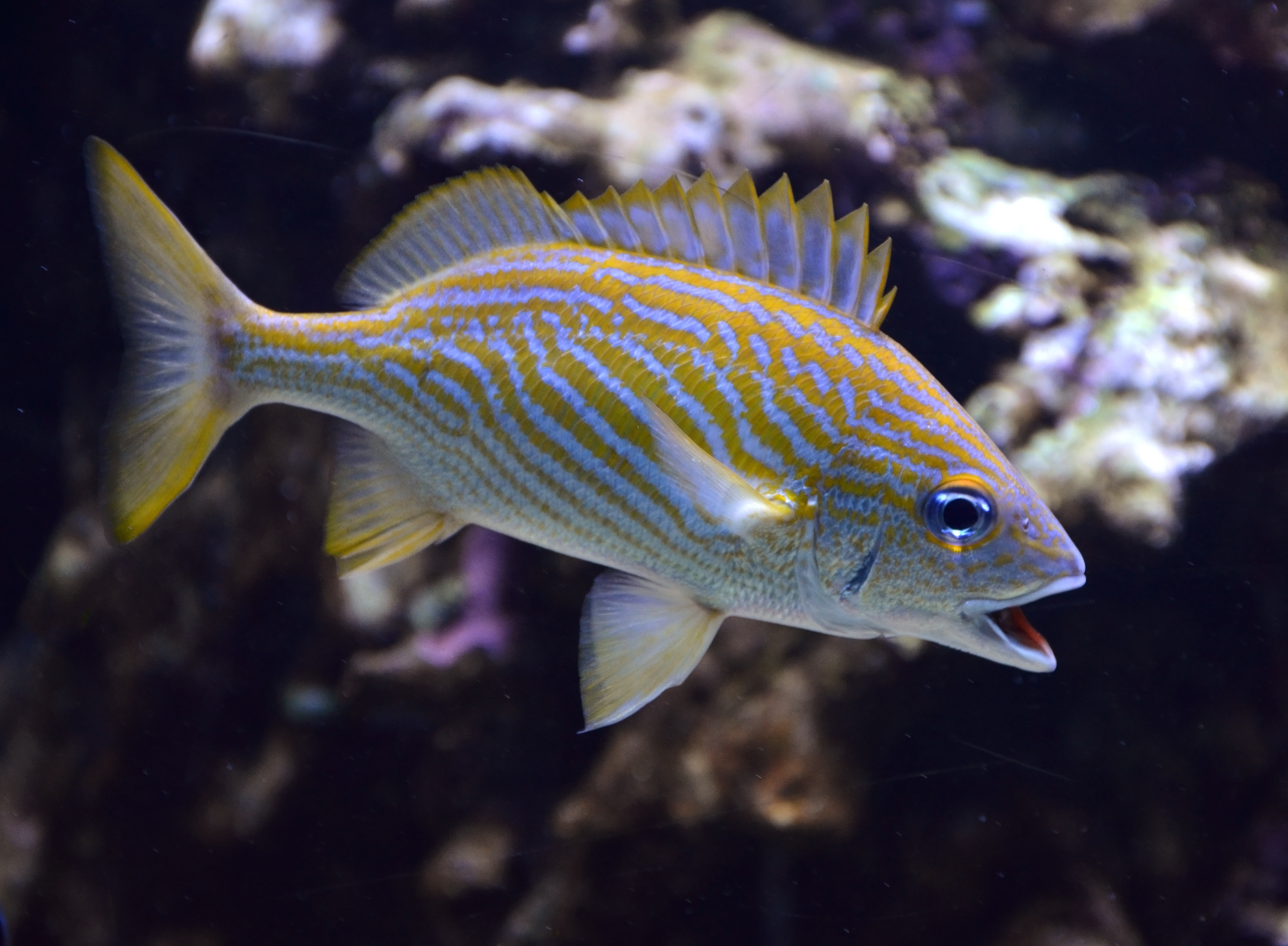
With fins fully extended

H. flavolineatum has an almond-shaped body, which is compressed and ends in a blunt snout. The small to medium-sized mouth has thick lips and has narrow bands of teeth on each jaw, the outer line of teeth being conical in shape, and no teeth on the roof of the mouth. It has a continuous dorsal fin with a small to medium-sized notch. The dorsal fin contains 12 spines and 14-15 soft rays while the anal fin contains 3 spines and 8 soft rays. The background colour of this fish is whitish to bluish or yellowish, with three vivid yellow to orange horizontal stripes above the lateral line and a number of similarly coloured oblique stripes below it. There are yellow spots on the lower surface of the head and the inside of the mouth is red. It has yellow fins and a white abdomen. This species attains a maximum total length of 30 cm (12 in), although 17 cm (6.7 in) is more typical.

== Habitat and biology ==
H. flavolineatum is found at depths between 1 and 60 m (3 ft 3 in and 196 ft 10 in), where it can form large aggregations involving thousands of individuals, over rocky areas and coral reefs. They may stay under ledges or near elkhorn coral. The juveniles are frequently found in large numbers sheltering in sea grass beds in protected bays, lagoons, and other coastal waters. They are mainly nocturnal and emerge at night to feed on benthic invertebrates such as molluscs, crustaceans, and polychaetes, foraging over sand flats and among sea-grass beds. They have pelagic eggs and larvae, but little is known about their reproductive habits. The larvae remain so for 2 weeks before settling among the sea grass.

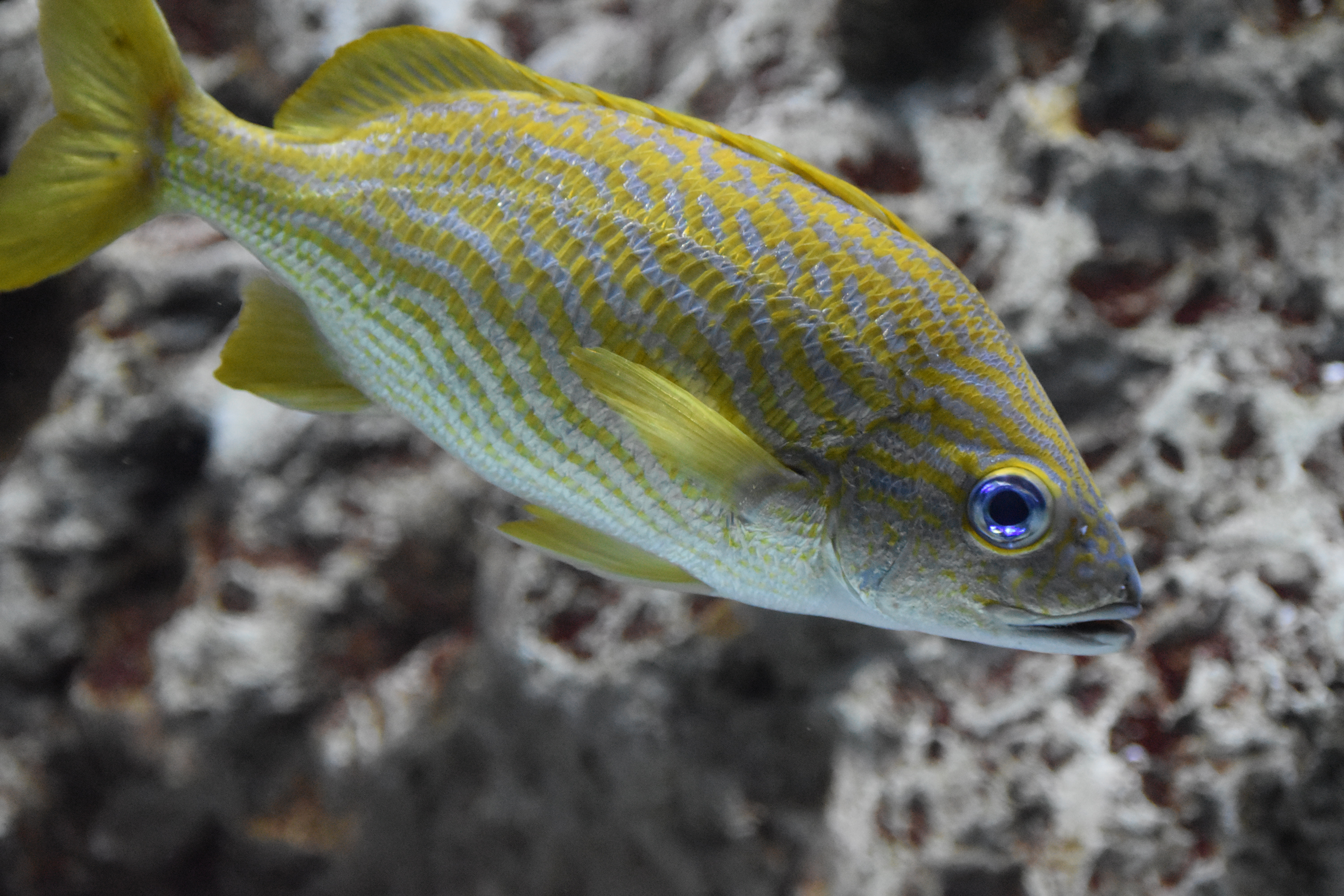
In captivity

=== Parasites ===
H. flavolineatum has many known parasites, among them is Gnathia marleyi, a small crustacean named in honour of reggae singer Bob Marley.

== Human uses ==
H. flavolineatum is an abundant species within its range, and is caught using traps and seines. The catch is not recorded separately for this species. The flesh is normally sold fresh. Off Barbados it is one of the commoner species caught in fisheries. It is rare in the aquarium trade, but is more common in public aquarium displays.
