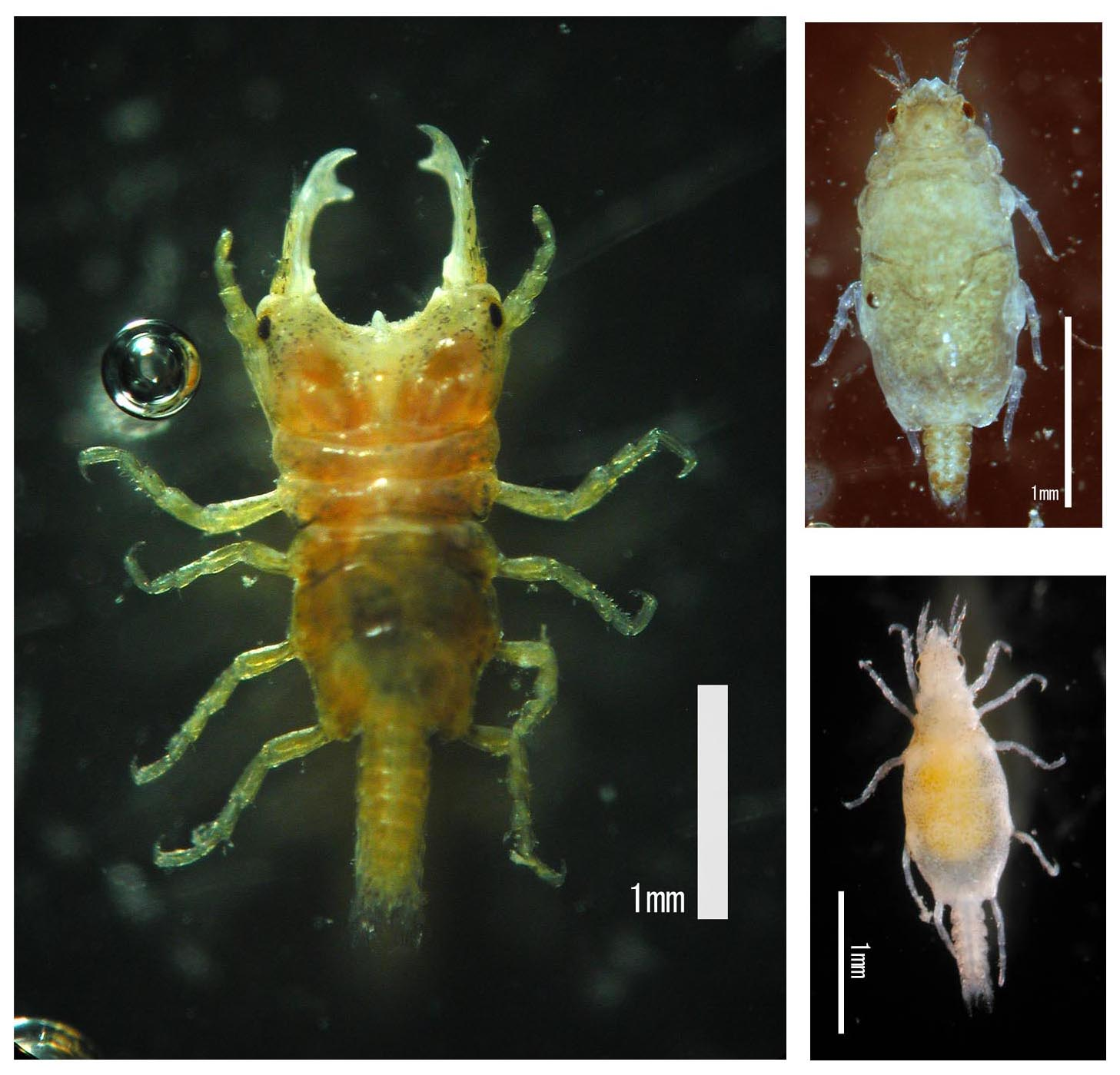
- Male (left), female (upper right), praniza (lower right)

Scientific classification
- Kingdom: Animalia
- Phylum: Arthropoda
- Clade: Pancrustacea
- Class: Malacostraca
- Order: Isopoda
- Suborder: Cymothoida
- Superfamily: Cymothooidea
- Family: Gnathiidae; Leach, 1814

= Gnathiidae =

Family of crustaceans

The Gnathiidae are a family of isopod crustaceans. They occur in a wide range of depths, from the littoral zone to the deep sea. Gnathiidae have only five pairs of walking legs. The adults are associated with sponges and may not feed. The juvenile form is known as a 'praniza', and it is a temporary parasite of marine fish. These forms are not larvae; Gnathiidae instead become parasitic during the manca stage. Mancae of the Gnathiidae closely resemble the adult form, however they lack the final pair of pereiopods.

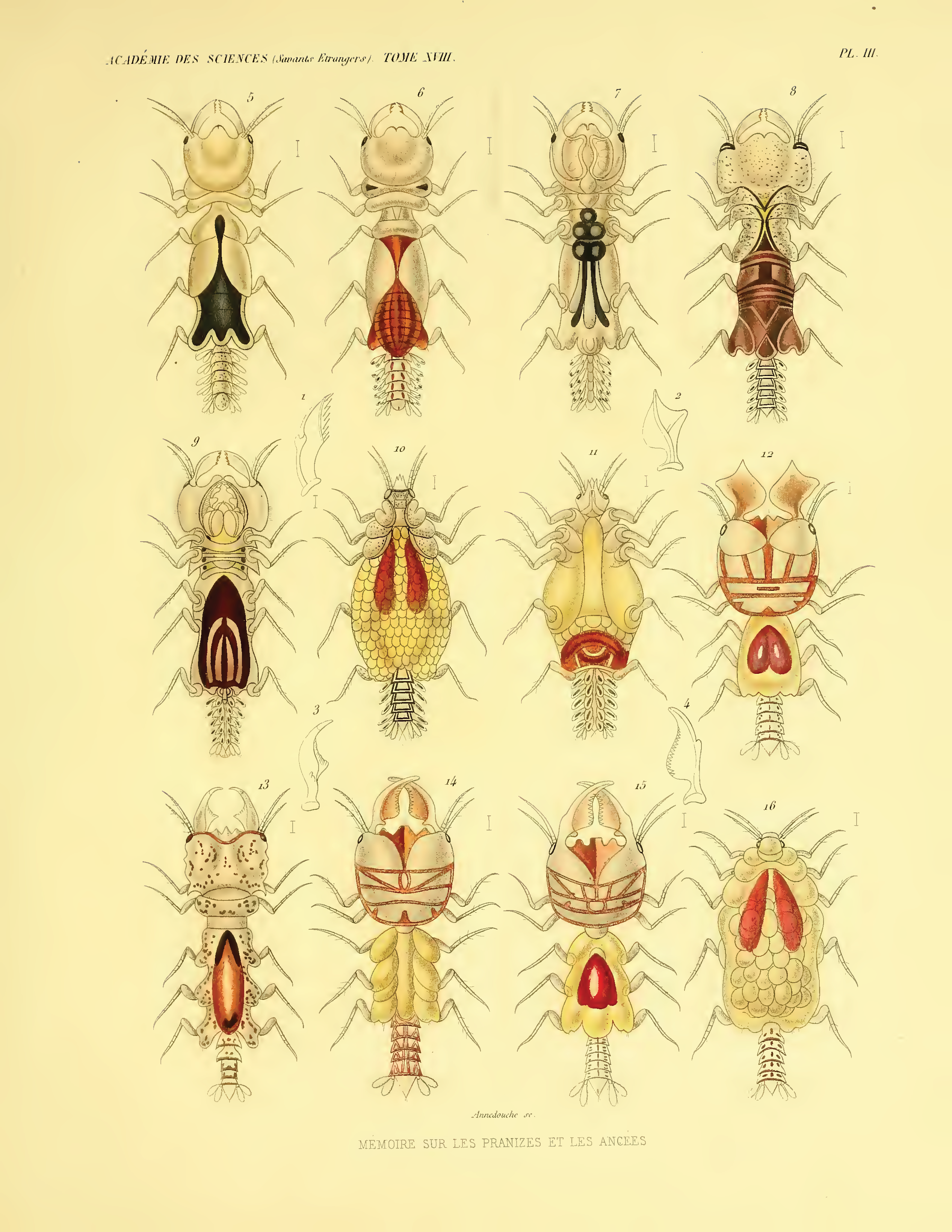
Drawings of Gnathiidae by Hesse (1864)

Taxonomy in the family relies on male characters, such that females and juveniles cannot be reliably identified. The family contains 182 species, divided among the following genera:

- Afrignathia Hadfield & Smit, 2008
- Bathygnathia Dollfus, 1901
- Bythognathia Camp, 1988
- Caecognathia Dollfus, 1901
- Elaphognathia Monod, 1926
- Euneognathia Stebbing, 1893
- Gibbagnathia Cohen & Poore, 1994
- Gnathia Leach, 1814
- Monodgnathia Cohen & Poore, 1994
- Paragnathia Omer-Cooper & Omer-Cooper, 1916
- Tenerognathia Tanaka, 2005
- Thaumastognathia Monod, 1926

The extinct Jurassic genus Urda is thought to represent a stem-group to the family, and is suggested to have had a similar parasitic lifestyle.
