= C. frontalis =

C. frontalis may refer to:

- Chortophila frontalis, a synonym for Delia radicum, the cabbage fly, cabbage root fly, root fly or turnip fly, a pest of crops
- Corythosaurus frontalis, a synonym for Lambeosaurus, a dinosaur species
- Chlorurus frontalis, a species of fish.

== See also ==
- Frontalis (disambiguation)
