= Phimophis =

Scientific classification
- Kingdom: Animalia
- Phylum: Chordata
- Class: Reptilia
- Order: Squamata
- Suborder: Serpentes
- Family: Colubridae
- Subfamily: Dipsadinae
- Genus: Phimophis; Cope, 1860

Genus of snakes

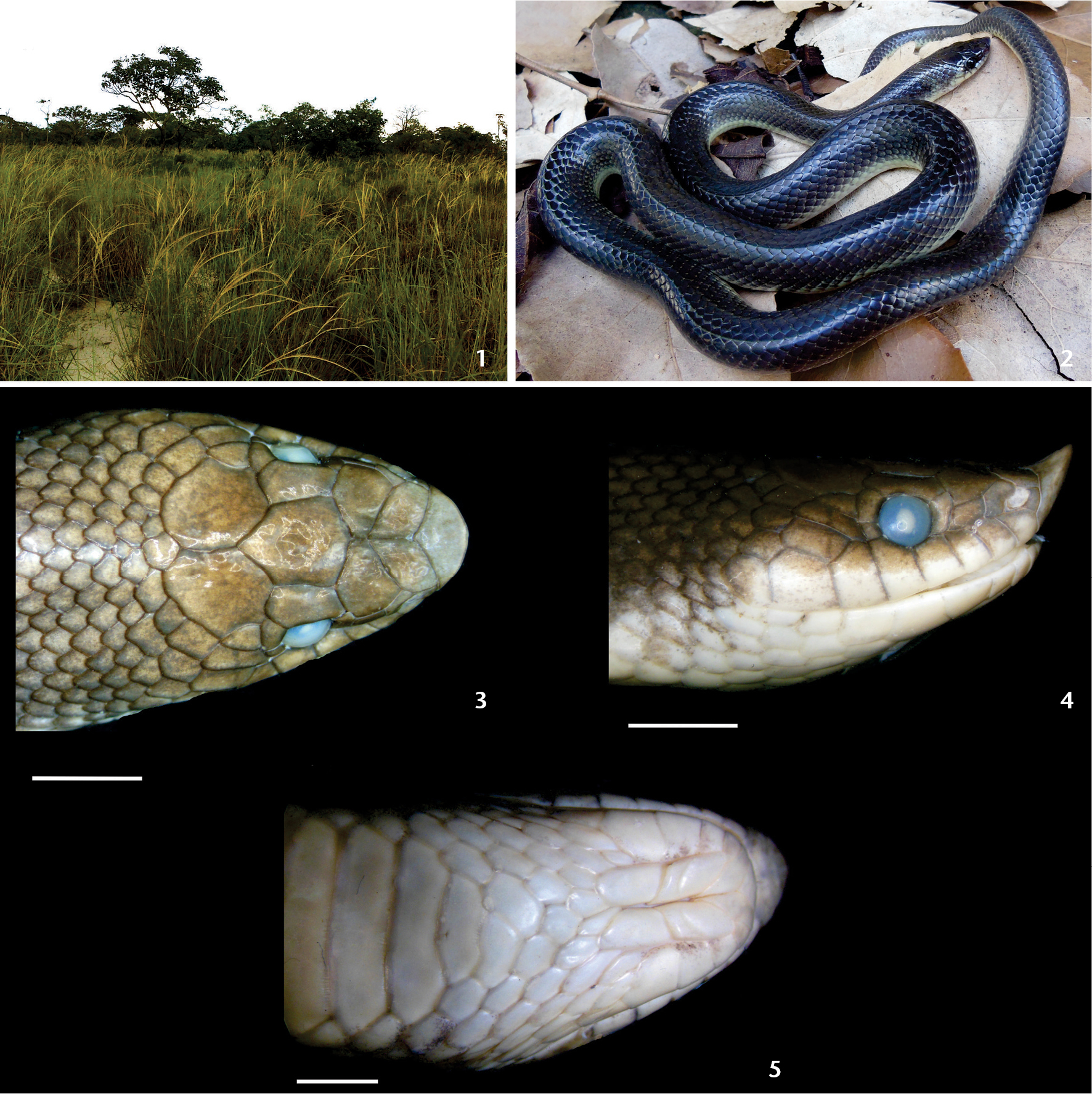
A specimen of Phimophis guerini collected in the Brazilian Amazon. Sections: (1) collection environment; (2) living specimen; (3–5) views of the head

Phimophis is a genus of snakes in the subfamily Dipsadinae. The genus is endemic to South America.

== Species ==
Three species are currently recognized.

- Phimophis guerini (A.M.C. Duméril, Bibron & A.H.A. Duméril, 1854) – Argentine pampas snake
- Phimophis guianensis (Troschel, 1848) – Troschel's pampas snake
- Phimophis vittatus (Boulenger, 1896) – banded pampas snake

Nota bene: A binomial authority in parentheses indicates that the species was originally described in a genus other than Phimophis.
