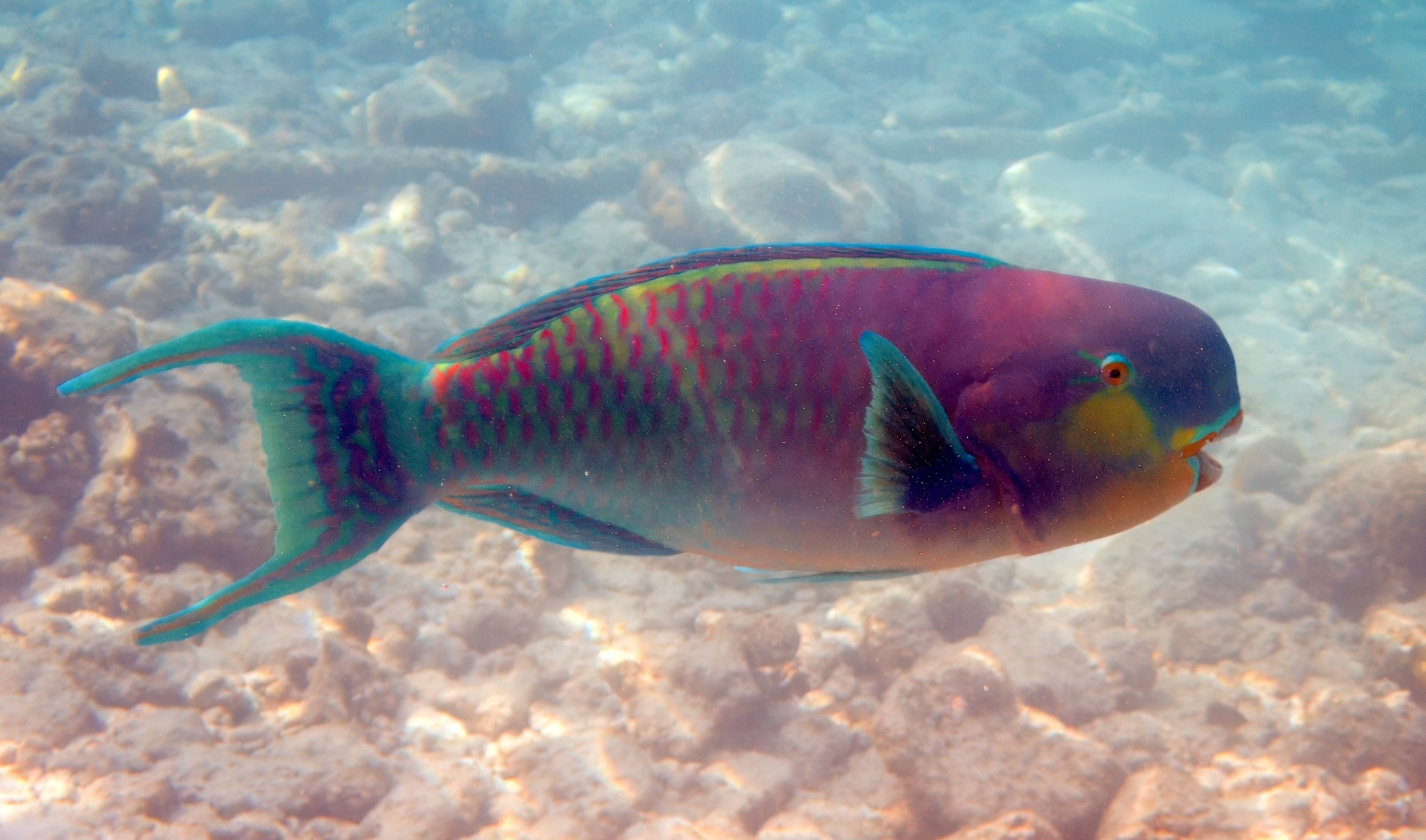
- Chlorurus strongylocephalus

Scientific classification
- Kingdom: Animalia
- Phylum: Chordata
- Class: Actinopterygii
- Division: Teleostei
- Order: Labriformes
- Family: Labridae
- Tribe: Scarini
- Genus: Chlorurus; Swainson, 1839

Type species
- Scarus gibbus Rüppell, 1829

Species
- See text

Synonyms
- Pseudoscarus Bleeker, 1861; Xanothon J. L. B. Smith, 1956; Ypsiscarus Schultz, 1958

= Chlorurus =

Genus of ray-finned fishes

Chlorurus is a genus of parrotfish from the Indian and Pacific Oceans.

== Etymology ==
The word 'Chlorurus' comes from the Greek words 'chloros', which means green and 'oura', which means tail.

== Evolution ==
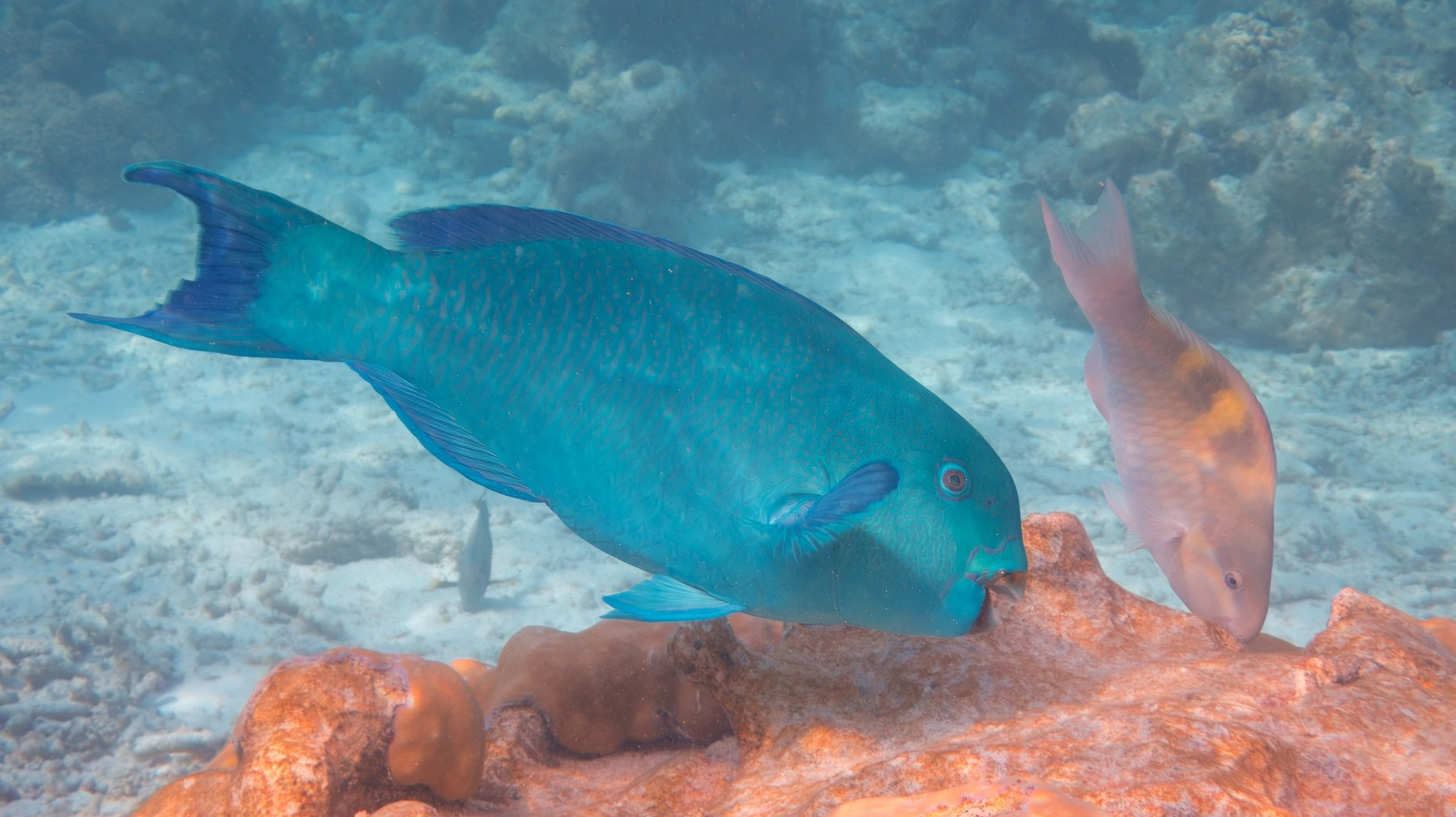
C. enneacanthus with an initial phase Scarus scaber, in the Maldives

Chlorurus is most closely related to its sister genus Scarus. Most recent phylogenetic analyses find that the two genera diverged during the late Miocene (Messinian). In both genera, most of their diversification occurred some time later, within the last 3.5 million years during the Pliocene. In contrast, coral reefs in their modern form were established much earlier, during the Miocene.

A 2012 phylogenetic analysis of 16 of the 18 Chlorurus species recovered 5 major monophyletic clades.

== Species ==
There are 18 species:

Species	Terminal phase	Initial phase
Chlorurus atrilunula (Randall & Bruce, 1983)		
Chlorurus bleekeri (de Beaufort, 1940)		
Chlorurus bowersi (Snyder, 1909)		
Chlorurus capistratoides (Bleeker, 1847)		
Chlorurus cyanescens (Valenciennes, 1840)		
Chlorurus enneacanthus (Lacépède, 1802)		
Chlorurus frontalis (Valenciennes, 1840)		
Chlorurus genazonatus (Randall & Bruce, 1983)		
Chlorurus gibbus (Rüppell, 1829)		
Chlorurus japanensis (Bloch, 1789)		
Chlorurus microrhinos (Bleeker, 1854)		
Chlorurus oedema (Snyder, 1909)		
Chlorurus perspicillatus (Steindachner, 1879)		
Chlorurus rhakoura Randall & Anderson, 1997		
Chlorurus sordidus (Forsskål, 1775)		
Chlorurus spilurus (Valenciennes, 1840)		
Chlorurus strongylocephalus (Bleeker, 1855)		
Chlorurus troschelii (Bleeker, 1853)		
