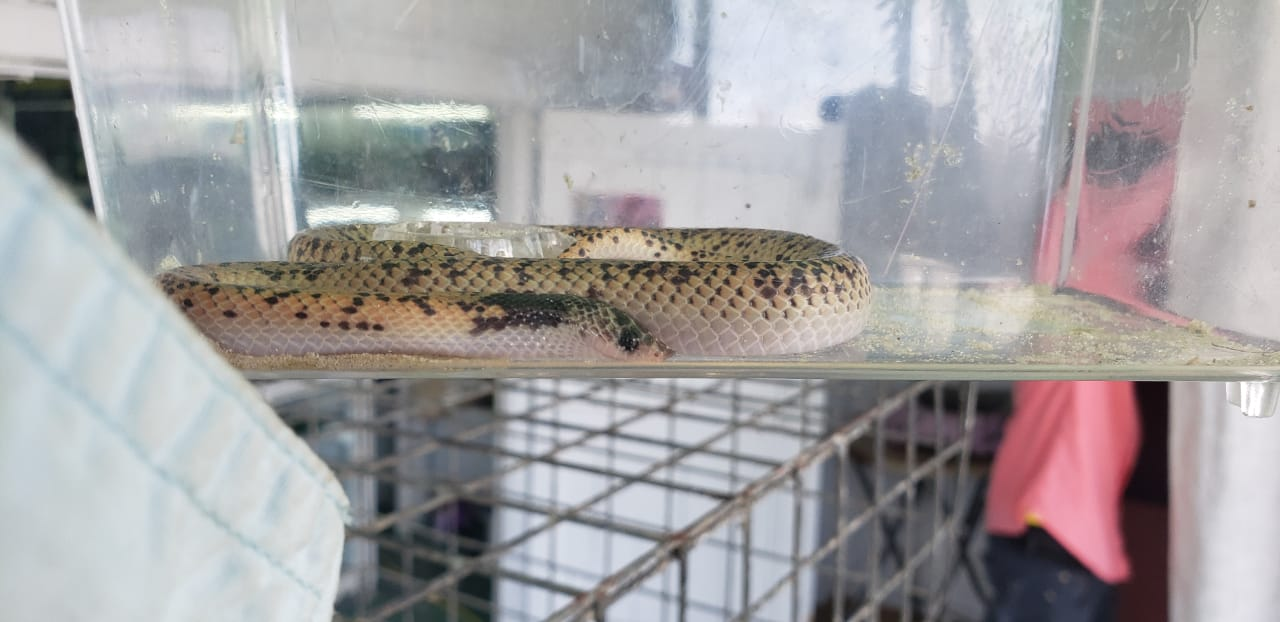

Conservation status
- Least Concern (IUCN 3.1)

Scientific classification
- Kingdom: Animalia
- Phylum: Chordata
- Class: Reptilia
- Order: Squamata
- Suborder: Serpentes
- Family: Colubridae
- Genus: Phimophis
- Species: P. guianensis

Binomial name
- Phimophis guianensis (Troschel, 1848)

Synonyms
- Heterodon guianensis Troschel, 1848; Rhinostoma guntheri Cope, 1860; Rhinostoma guianense — Boulenger, 1896; Rhinostoma guianensis — Bocourt, 1897; Phimophis guianensis — Dunn, 1944

= Phimophis guianensis =

Species of snake

Phimophis guianensis, also known commonly as Troschel's pampas snake, is a species of snake in the subfamily Dipsadinae of the family Colubridae. The species is endemic to South America.

== Geographic range ==
Phimophis guianensis has been reported from Brazil, Colombia, French Guiana, Guyana, Panama, Suriname, and Venezuela.

== Habitat ==
The preferred natural habitats of P. guianensis are shrubland and savanna, at altitudes from sea level to 250 m (820 ft).

== Description ==
Phimophis guianensis may attain a total length of 103 cm (41 in), which includes a tail 16 cm (6.3 in) long.

== Reproduction ==
Phimophis guianensis is oviparous.
