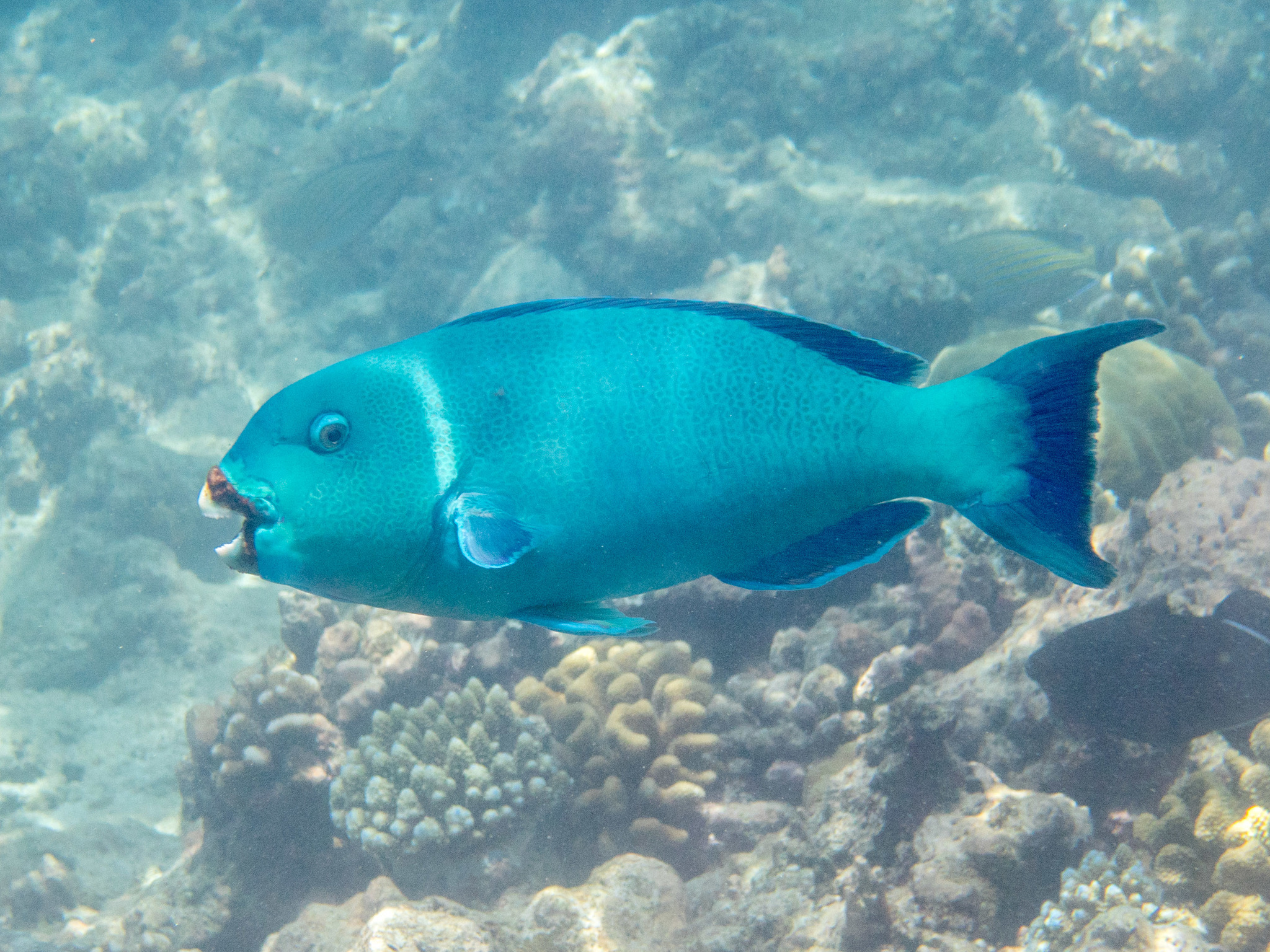

Conservation status
- Least Concern (IUCN 3.1)

Scientific classification
- Kingdom: Animalia
- Phylum: Chordata
- Class: Actinopterygii
- Order: Labriformes
- Family: Labridae
- Genus: Chlorurus
- Species: C. enneacanthus

Binomial name
- Chlorurus enneacanthus (Lacépède, 1802)

Synonyms
- Scarus enneacanthus Lacepède, 1802; Callyodon enneacanthus (Lacepède, 1802); Scarus capitaneus Cuvier, 1829; Callyodon capitaneus (Cuvier, 1829); Xanothon capitaneus (Cuvier, 1829)

= Chlorurus enneacanthus =

Species of ray-finned fishes

Chlorurus enneacanthus, commonly known as the captain parrotfish, is a species of marine ray-finned fish, a parrotfish from the family Scaridae. It is widespread throughout the tropical waters of the Indian Ocean region. Its range extends from Mozambique to Christmas Island.

The captain parrotfish is a medium-sized fish and can reach a maximum length of 50 cm.

== Gallery ==
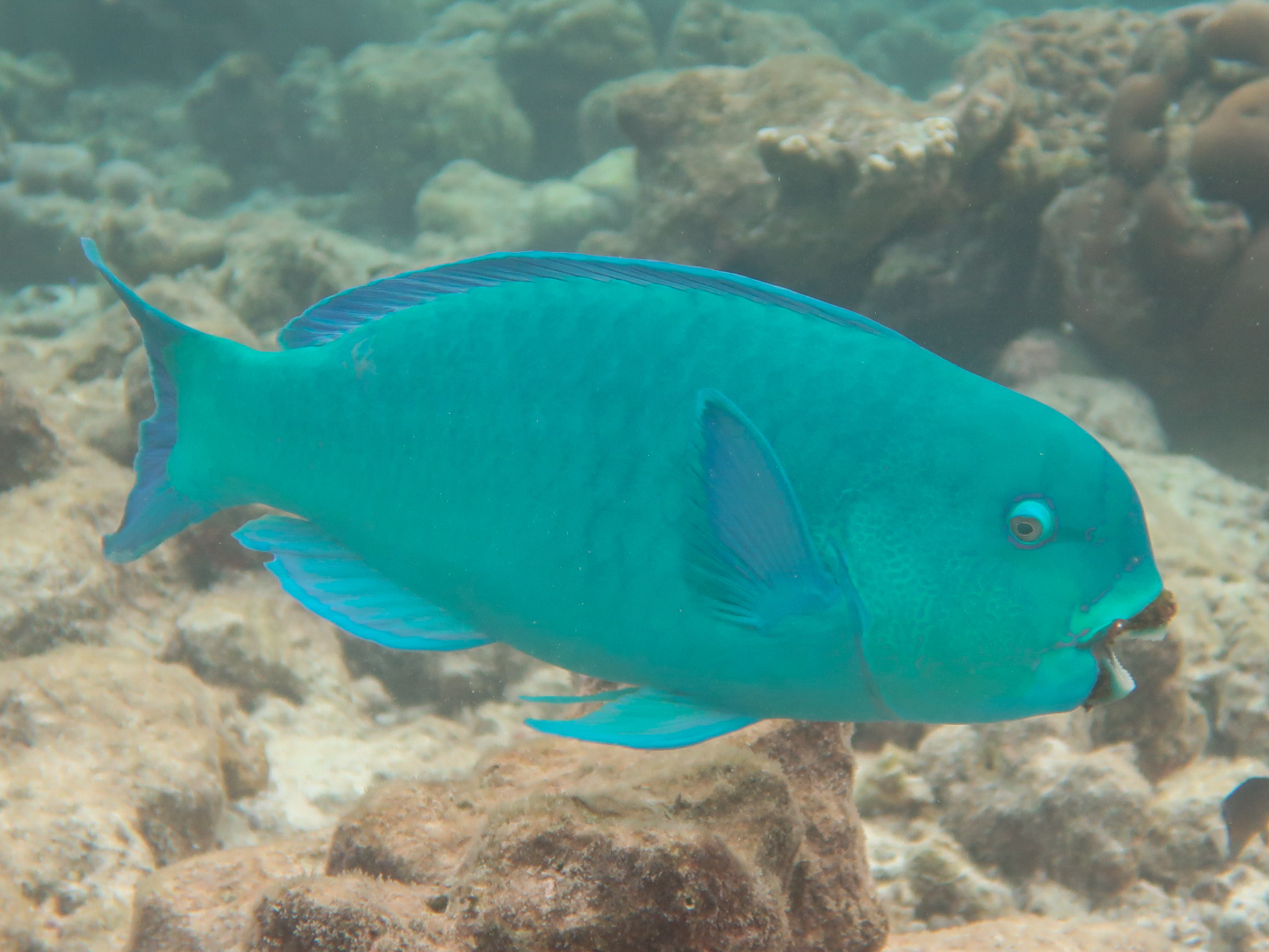

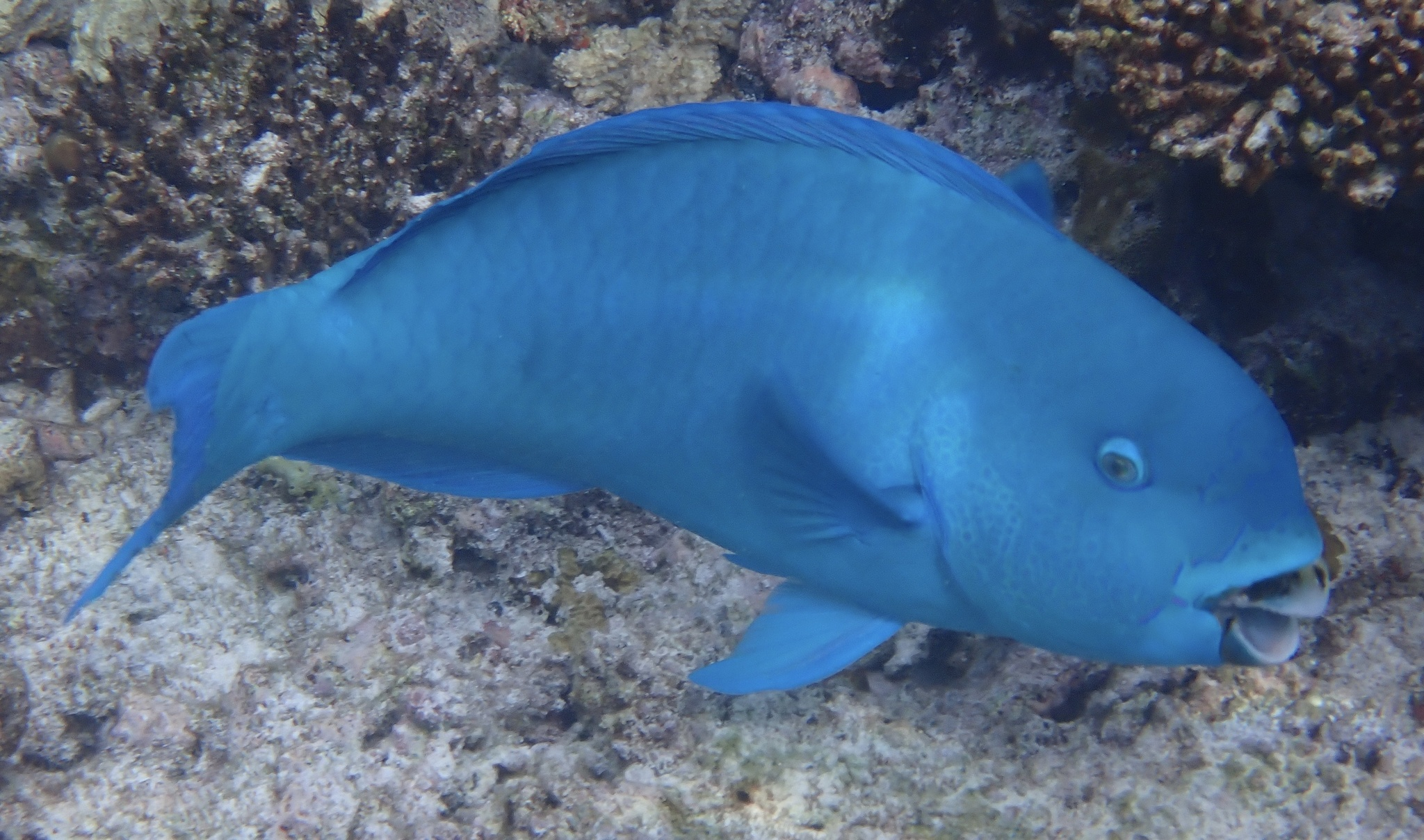

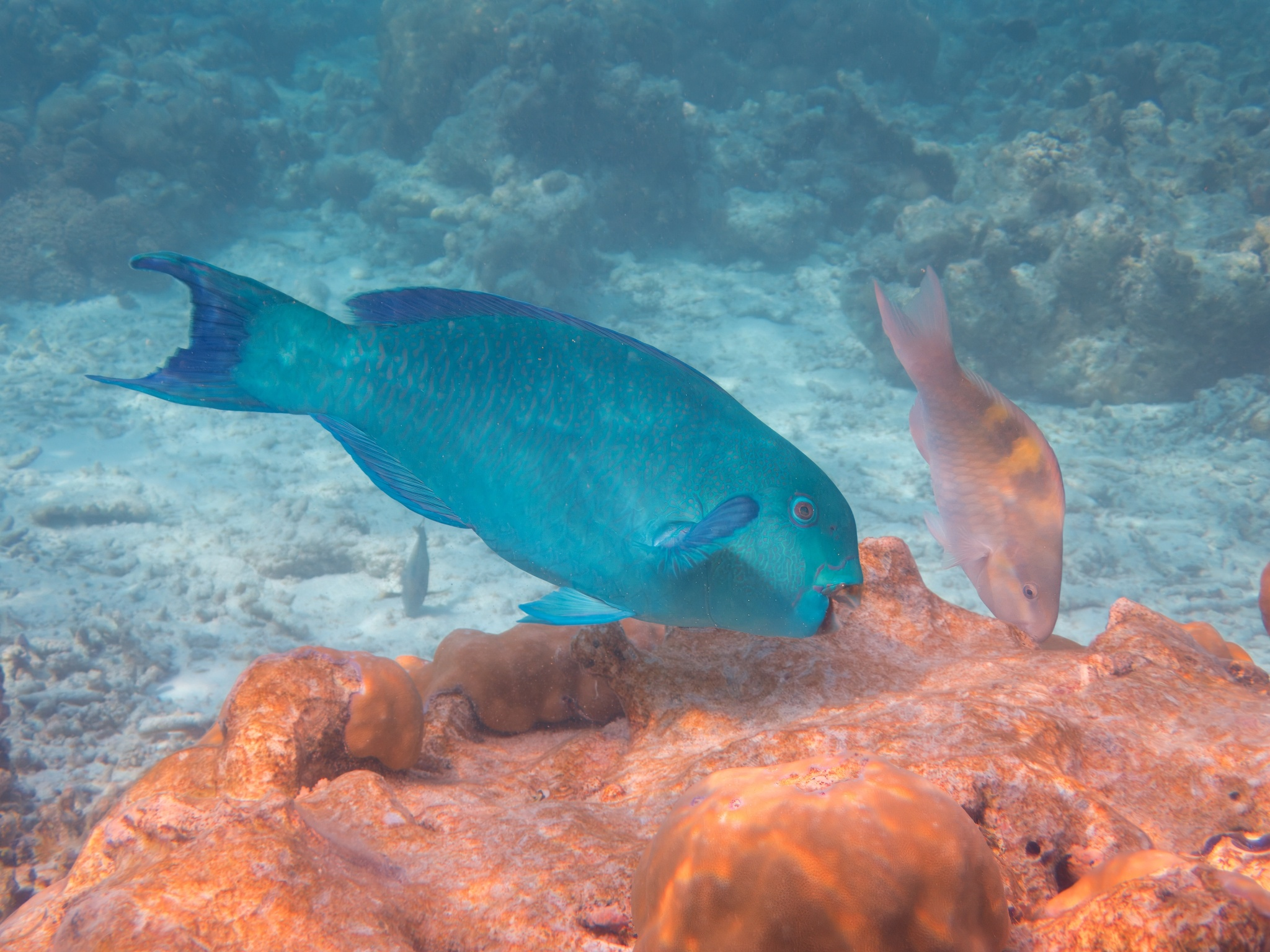

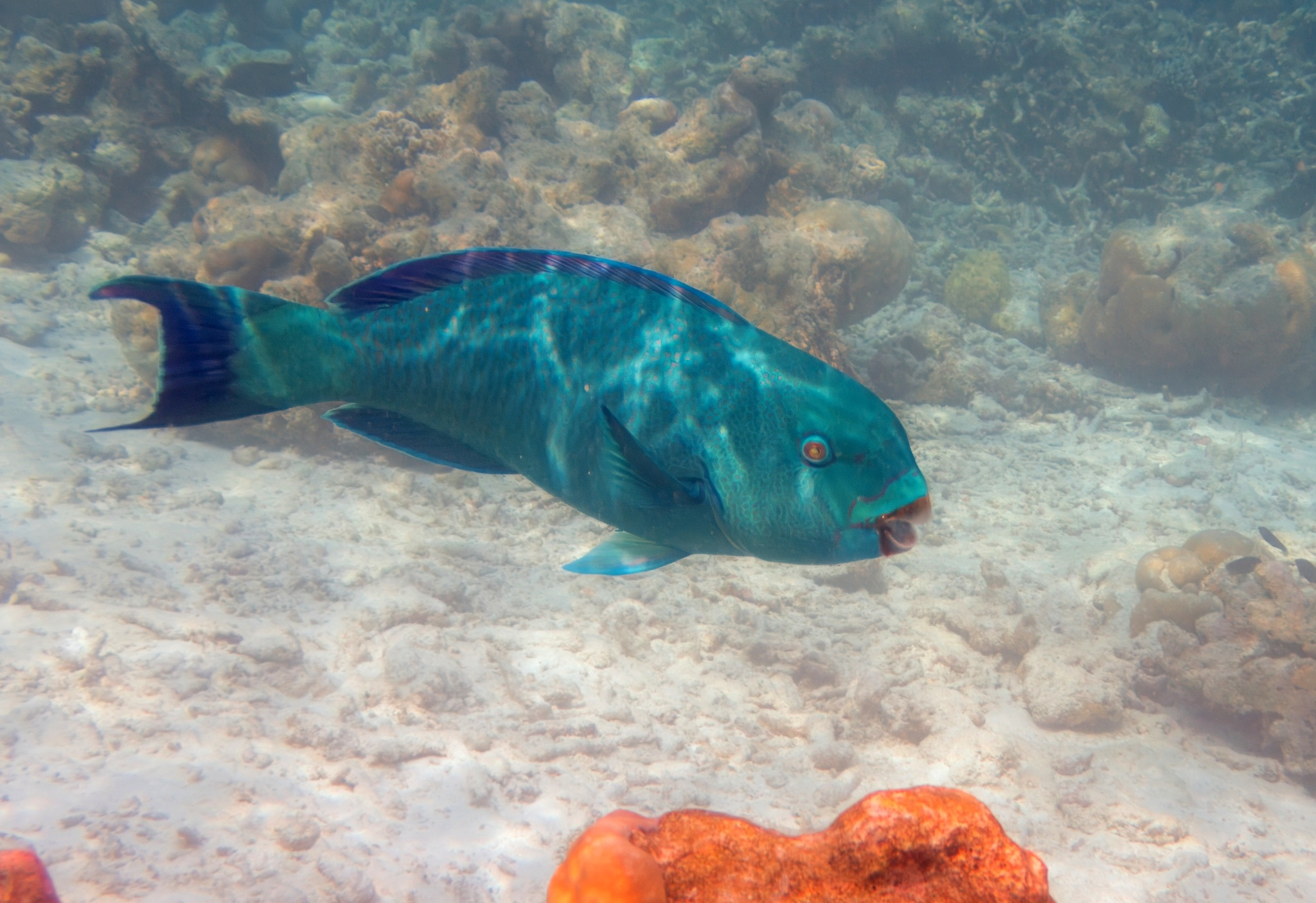
