= Phimophis vittatus =

Conservation status
- Least Concern (IUCN 3.1)

Scientific classification
- Kingdom: Animalia
- Phylum: Chordata
- Class: Reptilia
- Order: Squamata
- Suborder: Serpentes
- Family: Colubridae
- Genus: Phimophis
- Species: P. vittatus

Binomial name
- Phimophis vittatus (Boulenger, 1896)

Synonyms
- Pimophis vittatus Leynaud & Bucher, 1999; Rhinostoma guianense Serié, 1915; Rhinostoma vittatum Boulenger, 1896

Species of snake

Phimophis vittatus, also known as the banded pampas snake, is a species of colubrid snake in the subfamily Dipsadinae. It is endemic to South America.

== Distribution and habitat ==
The species has been recorded from shrubland, savannah and forest habitats in Argentina, Bolivia and Paraguay.

== Ecology ==
The species is terrestrial, burrowing in sandy soils. It has nocturnal habits and preys mainly on lizards.
