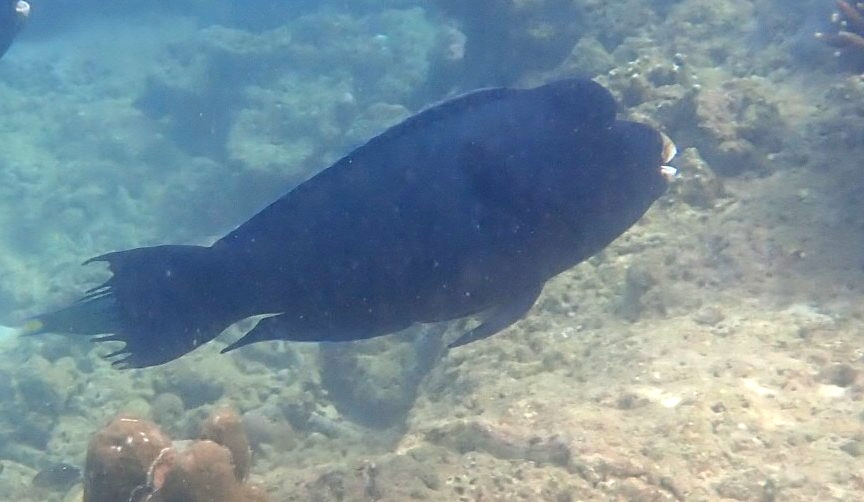

Conservation status
- Least Concern (IUCN 3.1)

Scientific classification
- Kingdom: Animalia
- Phylum: Chordata
- Class: Actinopterygii
- Order: Labriformes
- Family: Labridae
- Genus: Chlorurus
- Species: C. rhakoura

Binomial name
- Chlorurus rhakoura Randall & Anderson, 1997

Synonyms
- Chlorurus oedema (non Snyder, 1909)

= Chlorurus rhakoura =

Species of ray-finned fishes

Chlorurus rhakoura, commonly known as the raggedfin parrotfish, is a species of marine ray-finned fish, a parrotfish from the family Scaridae.

== Distribution ==
This species is mainly found in eastern Indian Ocean. It occurs near the coasts of Sri Lanka, in east Andaman Sea, near the coasts of Thailand, western Australia and Indonesia (eastern Halmahera).

== Description ==
The maximum length attained by this species is 44.2 cm. This species have a total of nine dorsal spines, ten dorsal soft rays, three anal spines and nine anal soft rays. Its cross section is compressed.

== Biology ==
This species usually inhabit inshore rocky reefs and often occur in small schools.

== Reproduction ==
This is an oviparous species. They usually exhibit distinct pairing during breeding.

== Relationship with humans ==
This species is generally harmless to humans. These are used commercially in fisheries and subsistence fisheries.
