= George Meade Bowers =

American politician

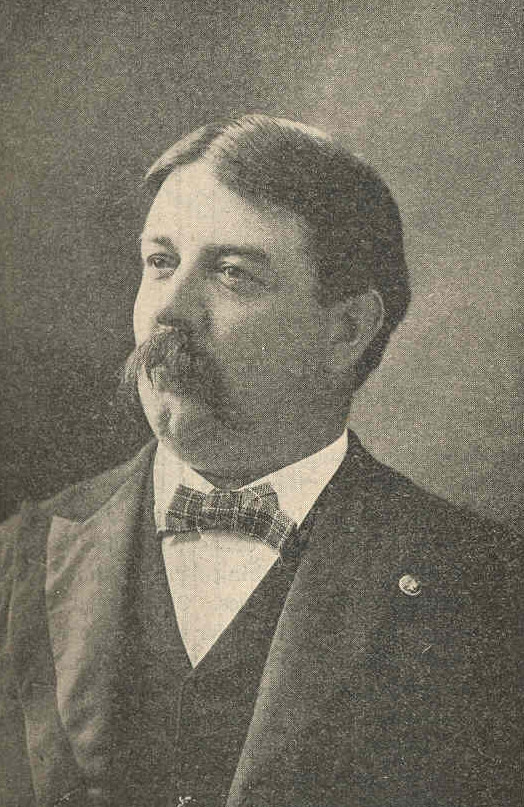
- George M. Bowers during his tenure as U.S. Commissioner of Fish and Fisheries.

Member of the U.S. House of Representatives from West Virginia's 2nd district
- In office May 9, 1916 – March 3, 1923
- Preceded by: William Gay Brown Jr.
- Succeeded by: Robert E. Lee Allen

Personal details
- Born: September 13, 1863 Gerrardstown, West Virginia, U.S.
- Died: December 7, 1925 (aged 62) Martinsburg, West Virginia
- Party: Republican

5th United States Commissioner of Fish and Fisheries
- In office 1898–1913
- President: William McKinley (1898–1901); Theodore Roosevelt (1901–1909); William Howard Taft (1909–1913)
- Preceded by: John J. Brice
- Succeeded by: Hugh McCormick Smith

George Meade Bowers (September 13, 1863 – December 7, 1925) was an American politician who represented West Virginia in the United States House of Representatives from 1916 to 1923.

== Biography ==
Bowers was born in Gerrardstown, West Virginia. He was educated by private tutors and attended high school. Later, he engaged in banking.

Bowers served as a member of the West Virginia House of Delegates from 1883 to 1887. He was the supervisor of the United States census for West Virginia in 1890 and a delegate to the Republican National Convention in 1892. He was a member and treasurer of the board of World’s Fair commissioners for West Virginia in 1893 and as the United States Commissioner of Fish and Fisheries led the United States Commission of Fish and Fisheries (widely referred to the United States Fish Commission) from 1898 to 1903 and its successor organization, the United States Bureau of Fisheries, from 1903 to 1913, when he resigned.

Bowers was elected as a Republican to the Sixty-fourth Congress to fill the vacancy caused by the death of William G. Brown, Jr. and was reelected to the Sixty-fifth, Sixty-sixth, and Sixty-seventh Congresses and served from May 9, 1916, to March 3, 1923. He was an unsuccessful candidate for reelection in 1922 to the Sixty-eighth Congress. After leaving Congress, he was president of the People’s Trust Company. He died in Martinsburg, West Virginia, in 1925 and was buried in the Presbyterian Cemetery, Gerrardstown, West Virginia.

The specific name of the parrotfish Chlorurus bowersi, described in 1909 by John Otterbein Snyder, honours Bowers.

Government offices
| Preceded by John J. Brice | United States Commissioner of Fisheries; 1898–1913 | Succeeded by Hugh M. Smith |

U.S. House of Representatives
| Preceded by William Gay Brown, Jr. | Member of the U.S. House of Representatives from West Virginia's 2nd congressional district 1916–1923 | Succeeded by Robert E. Lee Allen |
