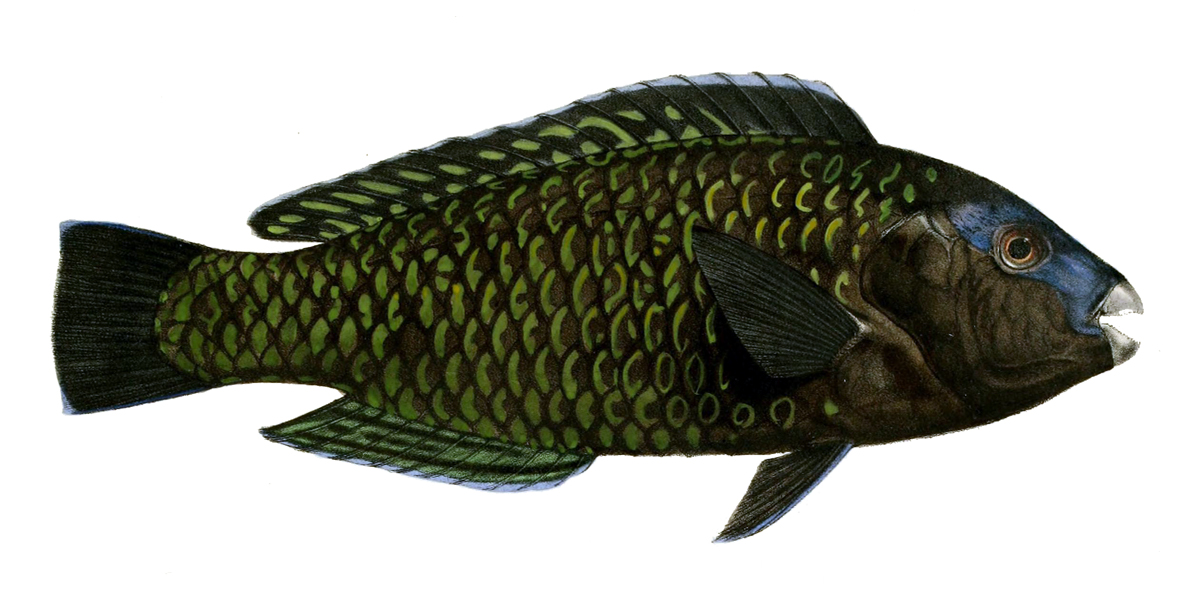

Conservation status
- Least Concern (IUCN 3.1)

Scientific classification
- Kingdom: Animalia
- Phylum: Chordata
- Class: Actinopterygii
- Order: Labriformes
- Family: Labridae
- Genus: Chlorurus
- Species: C. cyanescens

Binomial name
- Chlorurus cyanescens (Valenciennes, 1840)

Synonyms
- Scarus cyanescens Valenciennes, 1840; Pseudoscarus chloromelas Günther, 1867; Xanothon chloromelas (Günther, 1867)

= Chlorurus cyanescens =

Species of ray-finned fishes

Chlorurus cyanescens, also known as the blue humphead parrotfish or the saddled parrotfish, is a species of marine ray-finned fish, a parrotfish from the family Scaridae.

== Distribution ==
This species is mainly found in western Indian Ocean. The habitat of this species is known only from the peripheries of South Africa, Zanzibar, Madagascar, and Mauritius, but it is probably more widespread.

== Description ==
The maximum length attained by this species is 50 cm (20 in).

== Biology ==
The members of this species are usually found around deep rocky reefs up to a depth of at least 30 m (98 ft). They are mostly found solitary or in small groups. They are caught using nets and other types of artisanal gears. They are mainly sold fresh.

== Environment ==
Chlorurus cyanescens is a marine, reef-associated, non-migratory species. It is found 5 m (16 ft) and below.

== Reproduction ==
This species is oviparous. They pair up distinctly during breeding.

== Relationship with humans ==
This species is generally harmless towards humans. It is used commercially for fisheries and aquariums.

== See also ==
- List of species in the genus Chlorurus
