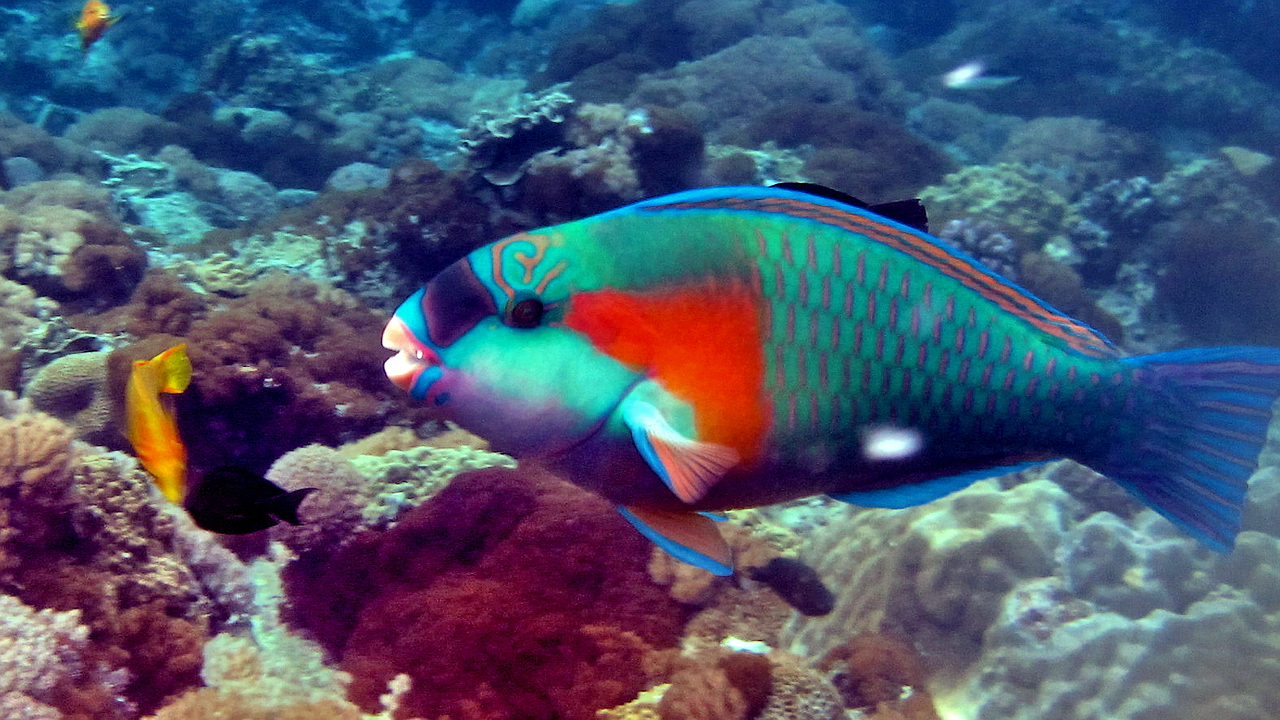
- Bower's parrotfish

Conservation status
- Near Threatened (IUCN 3.1)

Scientific classification
- Kingdom: Animalia
- Phylum: Chordata
- Class: Actinopterygii
- Order: Labriformes
- Family: Labridae
- Genus: Chlorurus
- Species: C. bowersi

Binomial name
- Chlorurus bowersi (Snyder, 1909)

Synonyms
- Callyodon bowersi Snyder, 1909; Scarus bowersi (Snyder, 1909)

= Chlorurus bowersi =

Species of ray-finned fishes

Chlorurus bowersi, commonly known as the Bower's parrotfish or the orange-blotch parrotfish, is a species of ray-finned fish, a parrotfish from the family Scaridae. It is found in the Western Pacific Ocean from the Ryukyu Islands of Japan in the north to Java, Papua and the Philippines in the south, and east to Micronesia.

This species is found in reef flats and fronts in sheltered areas or where there is moderate exposure to the currents or waves. This is a relatively small parrotfish generally found in pairs which excavates burrows. It feeds on filamentous algae. Chlorurus bowersi was first formally described as Callyodon bowersi in 1909 by the American ichthyologist John Otterbein Snyder (1867-1943) and the type locality was given as Naha, Okinawa, Japan.

== Etymology ==
The specific name honours the former United States Commissioner of Fisheries George Meade Bowers (1863-1925).

== Distribution ==
In Okinawa, no clear trend in the distribution of C. bowersi was observed, but it was seen in the inner and exposed reefs. In Natuna Island, C. bowersi was found around the shallower areas of reefs alongside other parrotfish species.

== Description ==
Chlorurus bowseri has a small, elongated, compressed body and a rounded snout. The dorsal fin of the fish is continuous, accompanied by 9 spines and 10 soft rays. The anal fin of the fish contains 3 spines followed by 9 rays. The pectoral fin of C. bowersi contains between 13 and 17 rays, and the pelvic fin contains 1 spine and 5 rays. The main scales of the fish are cycloid scales and are relatively large, while the fish also has cheek scale rows (1 to 4) as well as median predorsal scales (2 to 8). The lateral line of the fish consists of 22-24 pored scales and is interrupted. Chlorurus bowersi is a brightly colored blue-green fish with patches of orange on the head, pectoral fins, pelvic fins, and orange streaks throughout the dorsal and anal fins.

The jaw of C. bowersi contains well-developed pharyngeal bones along with a dental plate on each jaw. On the dental plate, there is a beak-like structure to assist with feeding. In comparison to other members of the Labridae family, C. bowersi has a larger weight of its adductor mandible, allowing it to have a greater biting force and powerful jaw mechanics. The interspecific differences in jaw-lever mechanics and the relative weight of the adductor mandible will factor into the grazing ability of the parrotfish. The teeth of C. bowersi are protrusive-shaped rather than flat-shaped.

== Life cycle ==
Chlorurus bowersi is considered to have an important role in maintaining balance within the coral reef ecosystem. The fish scrapes off algae from the surfaces of dead coral with the assistance of their beak-like dentition, preventing the growth of algae, which allows for the use of the corals by other organisms. This also plays a role in the bioerosion of coral reefs, which is important in the processing of building reef environments.

C. bowersi has been observed to spawn at high tide. After spawning, C. bowersi has been observed remaining in the area and feeding near the site of spawning. Terminal Phase males are known to be territorial and to pair spawn with females. To combat this, smaller Initial Phase males perform the behavior “streaking,” characterized by a fast intrusion at the time of gamete release between a spawning pair. C. bowersi has been observed primarily participating in pair spawning but has also been observed in group spawning.

== Relationship with humans ==
Chlorurus bowersi holds significance among humans primarily through fisheries, food, economic value, and tourism. Many residents along the coast of Indonesia and within the Coral Triangle rely on the coral reef fisheries and have utilized a variety of fishing methods to do so. This includes various target species, gear, and use of available habitats. While the fisheries are used to support human populations, exploitation of these resources can negatively impact the ecosystem populations as well as the tourism and diving industries.

== Conservation Efforts ==
Bower’s Parrotfish is considered a species of Least Concern. While Chlorurus bowersi does not meet the criteria to be considered a threatened species, it is assessed as a near-threatened species.

This conservation status has been a result of increased fishing pressure, resulting in population declines. The risk of local extinction due to these stressors is rising but is higher in some areas. These overfishing pressures are supported by visible changes in the trophic levels, length, and biomass of the species. One contributing factor to the issue of overfishing comes from the aquarium industry, as this family is included as one of the most collected aquarium species, specifically in Hawaii. Additional stressors of overfishing may be due to the growth in human populations alongside the commercialization of marine resources, increasing the demand for reef fish. Other elements of these stressors include the use of fishing gear and grounds, the size and density of the human population, and the management of them.

The status of other fisheries can also impact on the pressures of overfishing of C. bowersi. As some fishing seasons close, such as Grouper, the fisher's impact on these fish changes. As the ability to fish for a strongly desired fish, such as grouper, is no longer available, fishermen switch their targets to what is available, despite possibly being less desirable. This increase in the number of less desirable fish caught (Chlorurus bowersi) is done to maintain the profit levels of fishermen but adds a significant strain on these populations.

Other threats concerning the conservation status of C. bowersi include the conservation of its habitat, the coral reefs. Stresses on these habitats that impact fish biomass and abundances that include pollution (chemical, sewage, toxic waste, etc), sedimentation, temperature stress, destructive fishing practices, coral bleaching, and invasive species. This impacts the outer small islands of places such as Indonesia alongside the mainland, as these fish support global fisheries.

As a species of Least Concern, the majority of conservation efforts are concentrated on regulations within the fishery of Chlorurus bowersi. This comes from the idea that fisheries are shaped by the pressures and use of the fishery itself, which impacts even small geographical areas. Some calls for conservation action may include improved marine reserve networks, fishing regulations, designation and delineation of critical habitat, no-take zones, Marine Protected Areas, monitoring of population statuses, Fish Replenishment Areas (FRAs), and possibly even the establishment of a limited entry program for fisheries such as aquariums. Some strategies may also include restriction of some fishing gears, such as handlines, nets, and traps, to allow for recovery in certain areas and for diversity and sustainability maintenance.

Fishery closures, size limits, and catch quotas also seem to be popular ideas as methods of regulation. These could be most effective if they are done during the reproductive seasons of certain species, as it shifts the pressures from one species to another for a period of time. Although one concern with this effort is the unknown consequences of the shift in fishing upon other species that may experience similar fishing stressors.
