= William G. Brown Jr. =

American politician

William Gay Brown Jr.
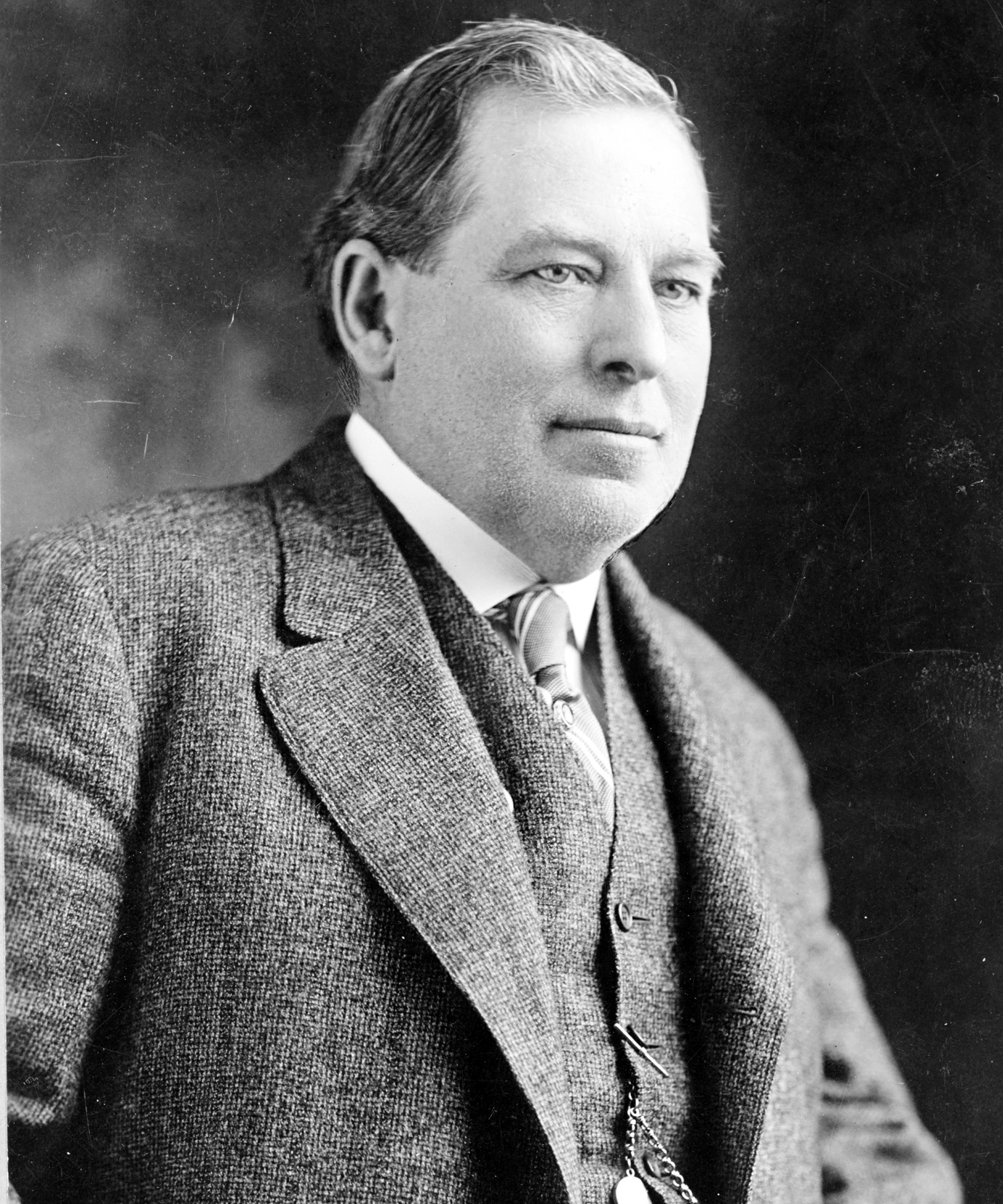
- Brown in 1911

Member of the U.S. House of Representatives from West Virginia's 2nd district
- In office March 4, 1911 – March 9, 1916
- Preceded by: George Cookman Sturgiss
- Succeeded by: George Meade Bowers

Personal details
- Born: April 7, 1856 Kingwood, Virginia, U.S.
- Died: March 9, 1916 (aged 59) Washington, D.C., U.S.
- Party: Democratic
- Education: West Virginia University
- Profession: Lawyer

William Gay Brown Jr. (April 7, 1856 – March 9, 1916) was a lawyer and politician who served as a United States representative from West Virginia. A member of the Democratic Party, Brown represented West Virginia's 2nd congressional district from 1911 to 1916.

== Early life ==
Brown was born on April 7, 1856, in Kingwood, Virginia (now West Virginia), the only child of lawyer and former Congressman William G. Brown Sr., and his second wife, Margaret Gay Brown (d. 1913), who survived her husband by nearly two decades and was close to her son. Brown's father was a leading Unionist during the American Civil War, sometimes called the "Father of West Virginia", and would be the first congressman elected to West Virginia's 2nd congressional district when the state was formed.

== Career ==
Brown graduated from West Virginia University in 1877, where he was a member of Phi Sigma Kappa fraternity. The same year, he was admitted to the bar and opened his law practice in Preston County. Like his father, he also worked in banking. His father died in 1884, leaving a substantial estate. In 1896, young Brown lost his first bid to become a congressman. In 1910, voters elected Brown as a Democrat to the 62nd United States Congress, and he was re-elected to the 63rd and 64th United States Congresses. He served from March 4, 1911, until he died in office on March 9, 1916.

== Personal life ==
Brown married three times. His first marriage was in 1883 to Jessie Thomas, of Tyrone, Pennsylvania, who died three years later near the birth of their daughter Jessie. His second wife, Flora B. Martin, a West Virginia native, fell victim to pneumonia in 1912 after about ten years of marriage. His third wife, actress and women's rights activist Izetta Jewel Kenney, whom he married in December 1914, gave birth to their daughter, Izetta Jewel Gay Brown, in March 1916. Brown died on March 9, 1916, in Washington, D.C., and was buried in the family plot at Kingwood Cemetery in Kingwood, West Virginia.

== See also ==
- West Virginia's congressional delegations
- List of members of the United States Congress who died in office (1900–1949)

U.S. House of Representatives
| Preceded by George Cookman Sturgiss | Member of the U.S. House of Representatives from West Virginia's 1st congressional district 1911–1916 | Succeeded by George Meade Bowers |
