= John J. Brice =

U.S. Commissioner of Fisheries

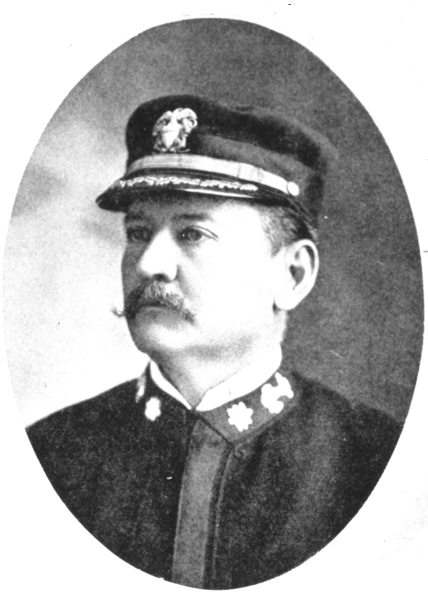
- John J. Brice during his United States Navy service.

United States Commissioner of Fish and Fisheries
- In office March 30, 1896 – February 16, 1898
- President: Grover Cleveland (1896–1897); William McKinley (1897–1898)
- Preceded by: Marshall McDonald
- Succeeded by: George M. Bowers

Personal details
- Born: 1841 Newark, Ohio
- Died: 1 January 1912 (age 70) San Francisco, California
- Profession: Naval officer

Military service
- Allegiance: United States
- Branch/service: United States Navy
- Years of service: 1861–1895, 1898
- Rank: Captain
- Commands: USS Don; USS Adams
- Battles/wars: American Civil War; Battle of Aquia Creek; Spanish–American War

John J. Brice (1841 – 1 January 1912) led the United States Fish Commission as the third United States Commissioner of Fish and Fisheries. He served in the position from 1896 to 1898. Prior to his Fish Commission service, he was a United States Navy officer who saw action during the American Civil War (1861–1865).

== Early life ==
Brice was born in Newark, Ohio, in 1841.

== Naval career (1861–1895) ==
=== American Civil War ===
After the American Civil War broke out in April 1861, Brice joined the United States Navy as a volunteer officer with the rank of acting master's mate on 23 August 1861. He reported aboard the armed sidewheel gunboat USS Thomas Freeborn in the Potomac Flotilla the same month. He subsequently served aboard the screw gunboat USS Eureka, the armed screw tug USS Primrose, the armed steamer USS Wyandotte, and the sidewheel gunboat USS De Soto.

Brice took part in the Battle of Aquia Creek of May 29 – June 1, 1861, and engagements with Confederate States Army artillery batteries at Potomac Creek, Virginia, on August 23, 1861, at Freestone Point, Virginia, on September 25, 1861, and at Cockpit Point, Virginia, on January 3, 1862. He also took part in a cutting-out expedition up the Rappahannock River in Virginia in April 1862 and an engagement with Confederate States Army artillery and infantry at Gloucester Courthouse, Virginia. At Gloucester Courthouse, he landed a force of men in small boats behind Confederate lines and captured a Confederate colonel of cavalry, whom he brought back aboard his ship, and he received a promotion for this achievement.

During a cutting-out expedition in Mattox Creek in Virginia that took place from March 16 to 18, 1865, Brice – by then promoted to acting ensign – led a 40-man search party that found itself in combat with a force of about 50 Confederate cavalrymen. While he was deploying his men to receive their attack, eight or ten cavalrymen fell upon on his left flank, but he drove them off, prompting the rest of the Confederate force to retreat. For this action he was recommended for an award for gallantry and received a promotion to acting master. He also participated in combat against Confederate ironclads on the James River as they attempted to pass Aiken's Landing, Virginia; in the attack on Jones's Bluff, Virginia, on the Rappahannock River; and in the capture of Fredericksburg, Virginia. When the Civil War ended in April 1865, he was the commanding officer of the armed steamer USS Don.

=== Post-Civil War ===
In March 1868, Brice was accepted into service in the regular U.S. Navy with the rank of ensign. He served aboard the screw sloop-of-war USS Quinnebaug in the South Atlantic Squadron from 1868 to 1869. Promoted to lieutenant on March 21, 1870, he had duty at the United States Hydrographic Office that year, then served aboard the gunboat USS Saco in the European Squadron from 1870 to 1872.

After torpedo service during 1873, Brice returned to sea with an assignment to the screw sloop-of-war USS Saranac on the Pacific Station from 1873 to 1875, when Saranac was wrecked on the coast of British Columbia in Canada. He had duty at the United States Naval Observatory in Washington, D.C., in 1876 and at Mare Island Navy Yard in California from 1877 to 1878. He returned to the Pacific Station, by then renamed the Pacific Squadron, in 1878, serving aboard the screw sloop-of-war USS Lackawanna from 1878 to 1881.

Promoted to lieutenant commander on April 15, 1882, Brice returned to the Mare Island Navy Yard for duty from 1882 to 1885, then was aboard the screw sloop-of-war USS Iroquois in the Pacific Squadron from 1885 to 1888. He then performed duty at the Washington Navy Yard in Washington, D.C., from 1888 to 1889.

Brice was assigned to the United States Commission of Fish and Fisheries (widely referred to the United States Fish Commission) from 1889 to 1890. At the time of his assignment to the Fish Commission, salmon populations were dwindling along the United States West Coast and in Alaska, raising fears that the fish might soon become extinct. By direction of the United States Commissioner of Fish and Fisheries, Marshall McDonald, Brice established an experimental fish hatchery at Fort Gaston in California. Brice went on to recommend the establishment of four similar fish hatcheries along the U.S. West Coast and in Alaska, with each of them, as well as the Fort Gaston hatchery, supported by four new auxiliary hatcheries.

Brice began duty as a lighthouse inspector in December 1892, then assumed command of the screw gunboat USS Adams in March 1894. Adams subsequently cruised in the waters of Alaska. Brice relinquished command of Adams and went on sick leave in October 1894. He retired from the Navy on February 1, 1895, due to physical incapacity incurred in the line of duty.

== U.S. Commissioner of Fish and Fisheries ==
U.S. Commissioner of Fish and Fisheries Marshall McDonald died in office on September 1, 1895, and the U.S. Fish Commission's chief clerk, Herbert A. Gill, took charge as acting commissioner until McDonald's permanent replacement could be found. Brice had served a tour of duty with the Fish Commission during his naval career and, in addition to demonstrating his administrative abilities, had taken great interest in the propagation of salmon along the U.S. West Coast On March 30, 1896 President Grover Cleveland appointed him as the third Commissioner of Fish and Fisheries, in which role he directed the activities of the Fish Commission.

As one of his first priorities as commissioner, Brice directed that the Fish Commission discontinue the rearing and propagation of "coarser" species (i.e., those less appealing as food or game fish) and prioritize commercially more important ones in inland waters and at sea in its fish-cultural activities. To this end, he focused the commission's work force on the American shad fishery along the United States East Coast, the collection of lobster eggs in New England, and the propagation of tautog, resulting in increased propagation of all three by the middle of 1896. He also emphasized the propagation of mackerel, which had become scarce in the Atlantic Ocean off the United States, and of salmon on both the U.S. East and West Coasts, traveling to the West Coast to oversee personally the selection of sites for new salmon hatcheries. He continued planned investigations of the fur seal herds in the Pribilof, Commander, and Kuril Islands.

By mid-1897, salmon egg production had tripled over that of previous years, and the Fish Commission also had made good progress in its efforts to support the lobster, mackerel and American shad fisheries. It also had engaged in efforts to introduce aquatic species of various kinds into new regions of the United States. The propagation and distribution of food fishes continued to increase substantially into 1898.

In 1898, President William McKinley appointed George Meade Bowers, a banker and politician from West Virginia, to replace Brice as commissioner. McKinley's decision sparked controversy: The New York Evening Post criticized McKinley for nominating candidates to the leadership of scientific agencies according to the incentives of a spoils system rather than for the scientific experience of the candidates, and the Philadelphia Inquirer published an editorial decrying McKinley's decision to replace Brice, arguing that Brice had performed well, that Bowers had no scientific qualifications for the position, and that McKinley was replacing Brice – who had been appointed by McKinley's predecessor Grover Cleveland – merely because of political considerations, which the Inquirer claimed had never affected the commissioner's position before. Although there was an outcry in support of Brice in scientific circles, McKinley went ahead with the appointment of Bowers on February 1, 1898, and Brice asked his supporters not to object to McKinley's choice. On February 16, 1898, Brice stepped aside and Bowers became commissioner.

== Spanish–American War ==
The Spanish–American War broke out in April 1898, and Brice returned to active duty in the Navy with the rank of captain, serving as captain of the yard at Mare Island Navy Yard. He retired again after the war ended in August 1898.

== Death ==
Brice died at the age of 70 on January 1, 1912, at San Francisco, California.

Government offices
Preceded by Marshall McDonald	United States Commissioner of Fish and Fisheries; 1896–1898	Succeeded by George Meade Bowers
