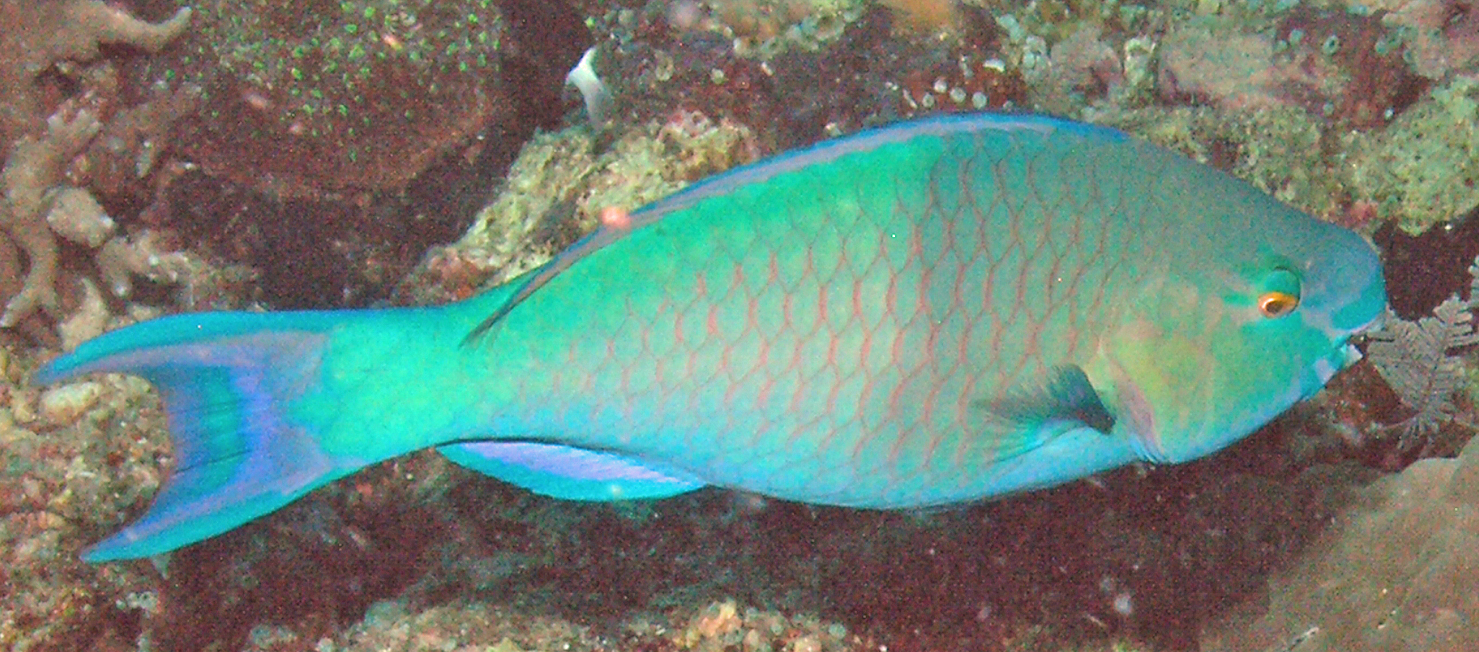

Conservation status
- Least Concern (IUCN 3.1)

Scientific classification
- Kingdom: Animalia
- Phylum: Chordata
- Class: Actinopterygii
- Division: Teleostei
- Order: Labriformes
- Family: Labridae
- Genus: Chlorurus
- Species: C. troschelii

Binomial name
- Chlorurus troschelii (Bleeker, 1853)

Synonyms
- Scarus troschelii Bleeker, 1853; Pseudoscarus troscheli (Bleeker, 1853); Pseudoscarus rhoduropterus Bleeker, 1861; Scarus rhoduropterus (Bleeker, 1861); Xanothon rhoduropterus (Bleeker, 1861)

= Chlorurus troschelii =

Species of ray-finned fishes

Chlorurus troschelii, commonly known as Troschel's parrotfish, is a species of marine ray-finned fish, a parrotfish from the family Scaridae. It is native to the eastern Indian Ocean, where it lives in coral reefs. The fish is named in honor of zoologist Franz Hermann Troschel (1810-1882).

== Description ==
C. troschelii has different varieties.

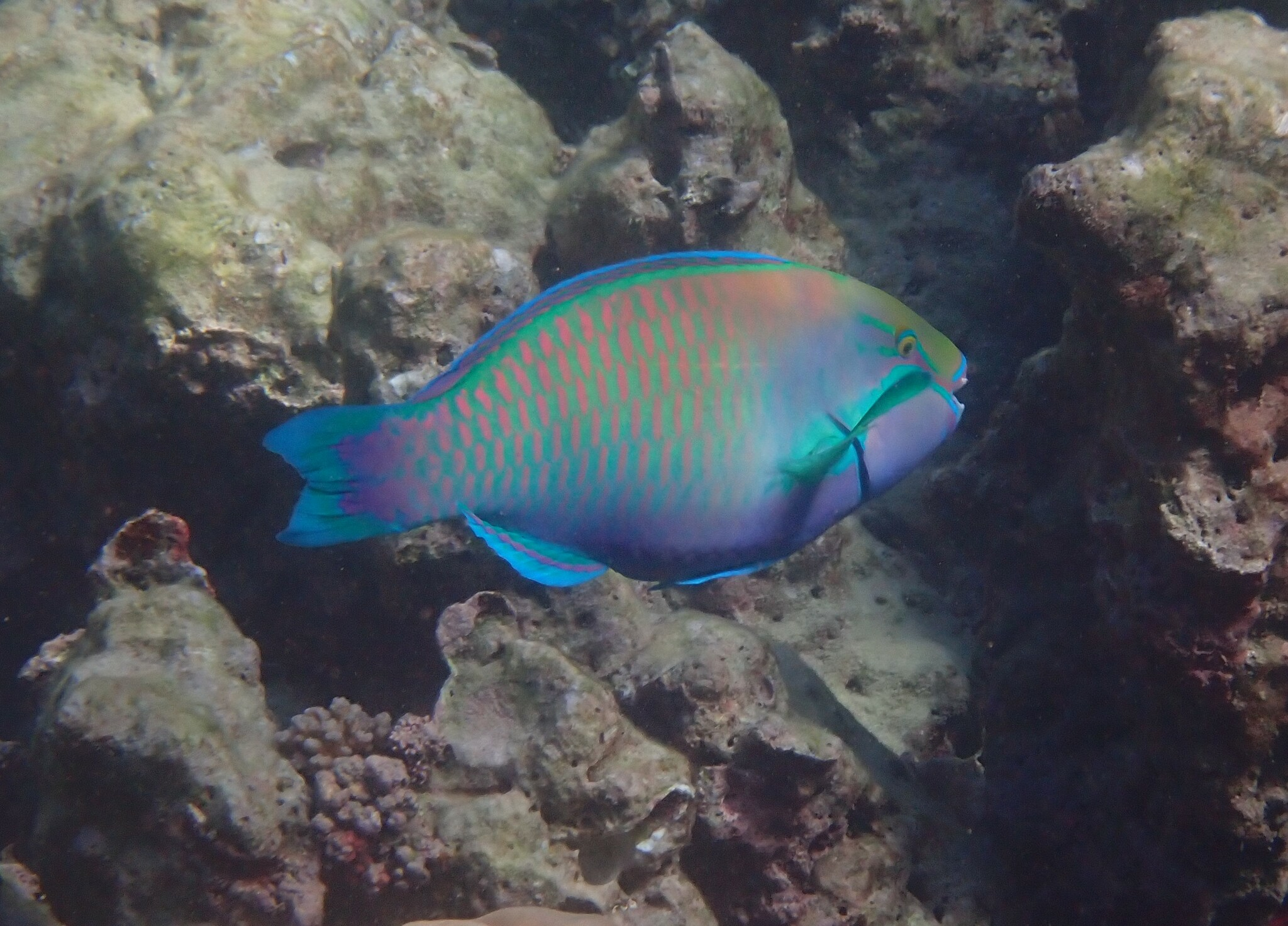
Male

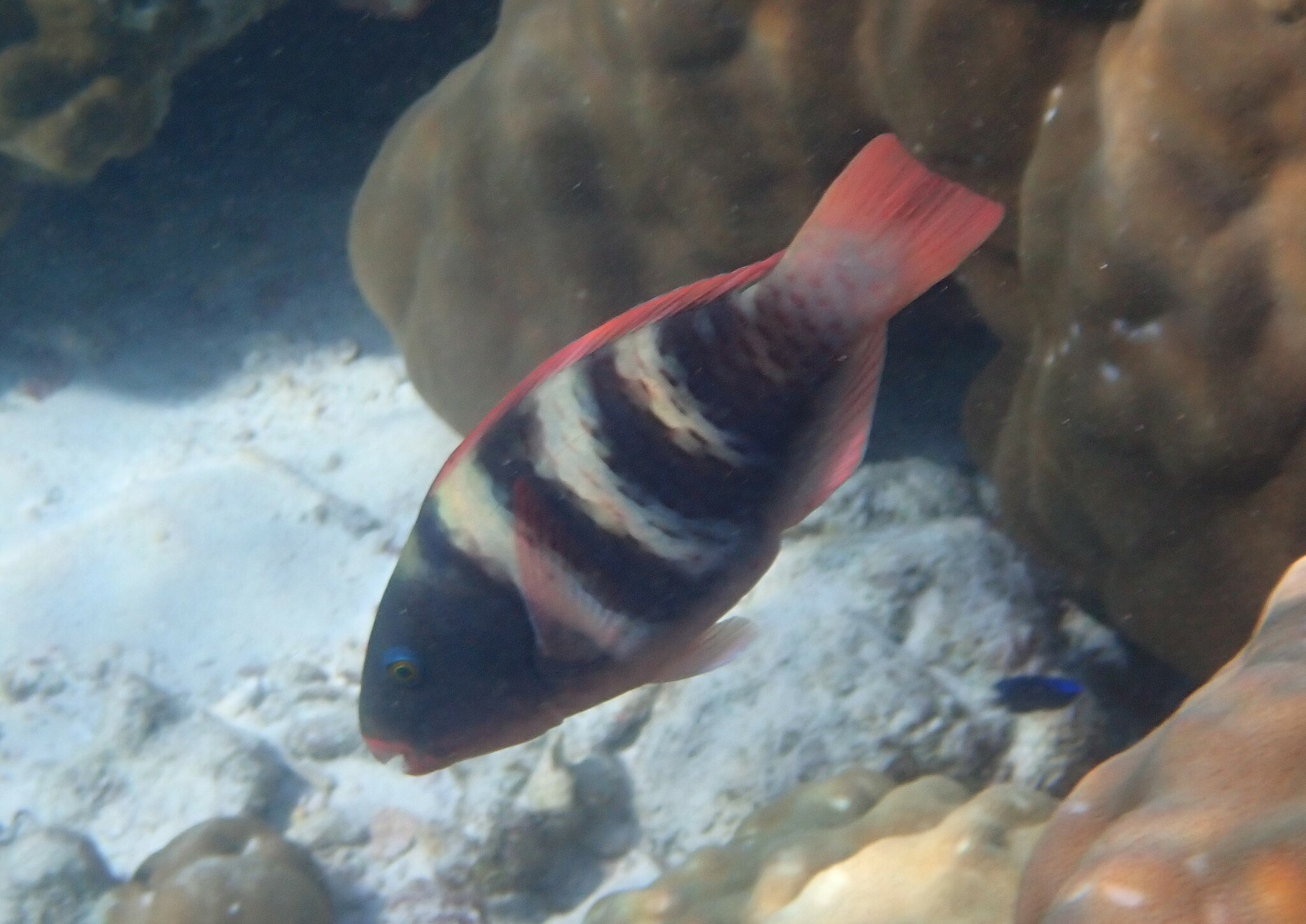
Female

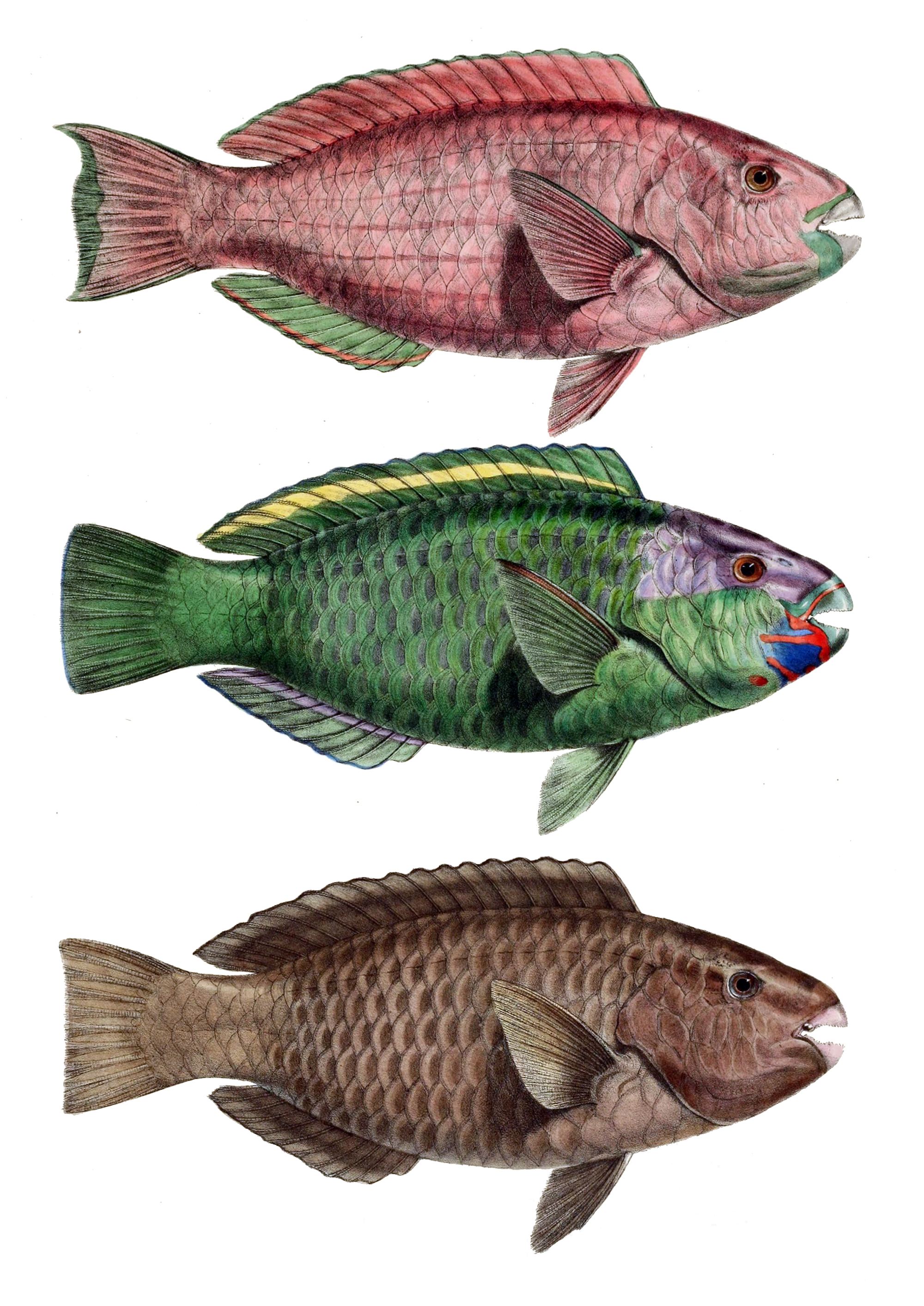
Different varieties
