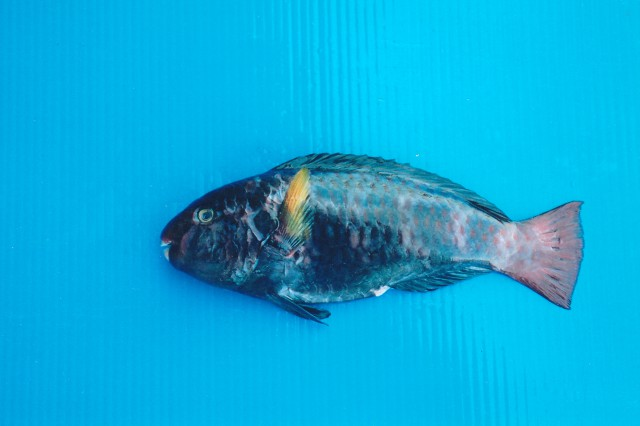

Conservation status
- Least Concern (IUCN 3.1)

Scientific classification
- Kingdom: Animalia
- Phylum: Chordata
- Class: Actinopterygii
- Order: Labriformes
- Family: Labridae
- Genus: Chlorurus
- Species: C. capistratoides

Binomial name
- Chlorurus capistratoides (Bleeker, 1847)

Synonyms
- Scarus capistratoides Bleeker, 1847; Xanothon capistratoides (Bleeker, 1847)

= Chlorurus capistratoides =

Species of ray-finned fishes

Chlorurus capistratoides, commonly known as the Indian parrotfish or the pink-margined parrotfish, is a marine ray-finned fish, a parrotfish from the family Scaridae. This species is native to the eastern Indian Ocean and western Pacific Ocean, where it lives in coral reefs. This species occurs in small schools, frequently mixed in with other fish species, these schools forage over corals in clear coastal and inner reefs where there is abundant algal and coral growth. It feeds on filamentous algae.
