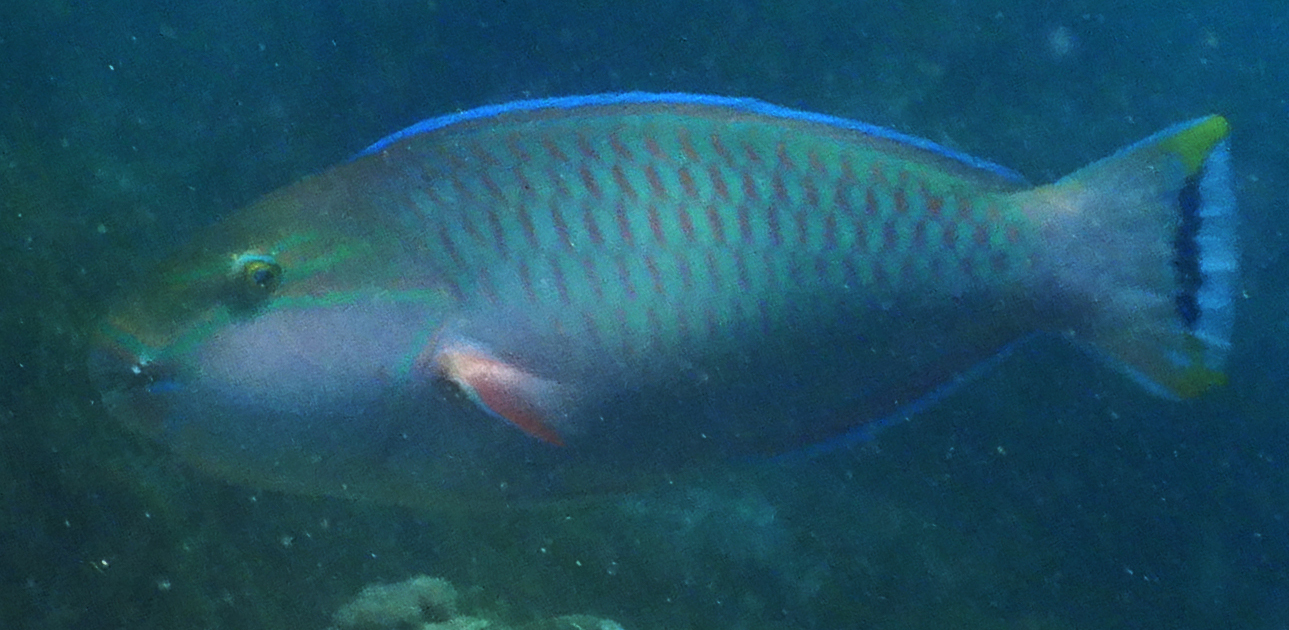

Conservation status
- Least Concern (IUCN 3.1)

Scientific classification
- Kingdom: Animalia
- Phylum: Chordata
- Class: Actinopterygii
- Order: Labriformes
- Family: Labridae
- Genus: Chlorurus
- Species: C. atrilunula

Binomial name
- Chlorurus atrilunula (Randall & Bruce, 1983)

Synonyms
- Scarus atrilunula Randall & Bruce, 1983; Callyodon capistratoides (non Bleeker, 1847; Xanothon capistratoides (non Bleeker, 1847)

= Chlorurus atrilunula =

Species of ray-finned fishes

Chlorurus rhakoura, commonly known as the bluemoon parrotfish or the black crescent parrotfish, is a species of marine ray-finned fish, a parrotfish from the family Scaridae.

== Distribution ==
This species is found in western Indian Ocean. It habitat is known only from Kenya to South Africa. Presence of this species in Somalia still needs to be confirmed.

== Biology ==
This species is generally found in silty protected reefs, over sand and rubble. They feed on benthic algae. They are usually caught with nets and other artisanal gear and mainly sold fresh.

== Reproduction ==
This is an oviparous species. They usually exhibit distinct pairing during breeding.

== Relationship with humans ==
This species is generally harmless to humans. They are used commercially in fisheries and aquariums.
