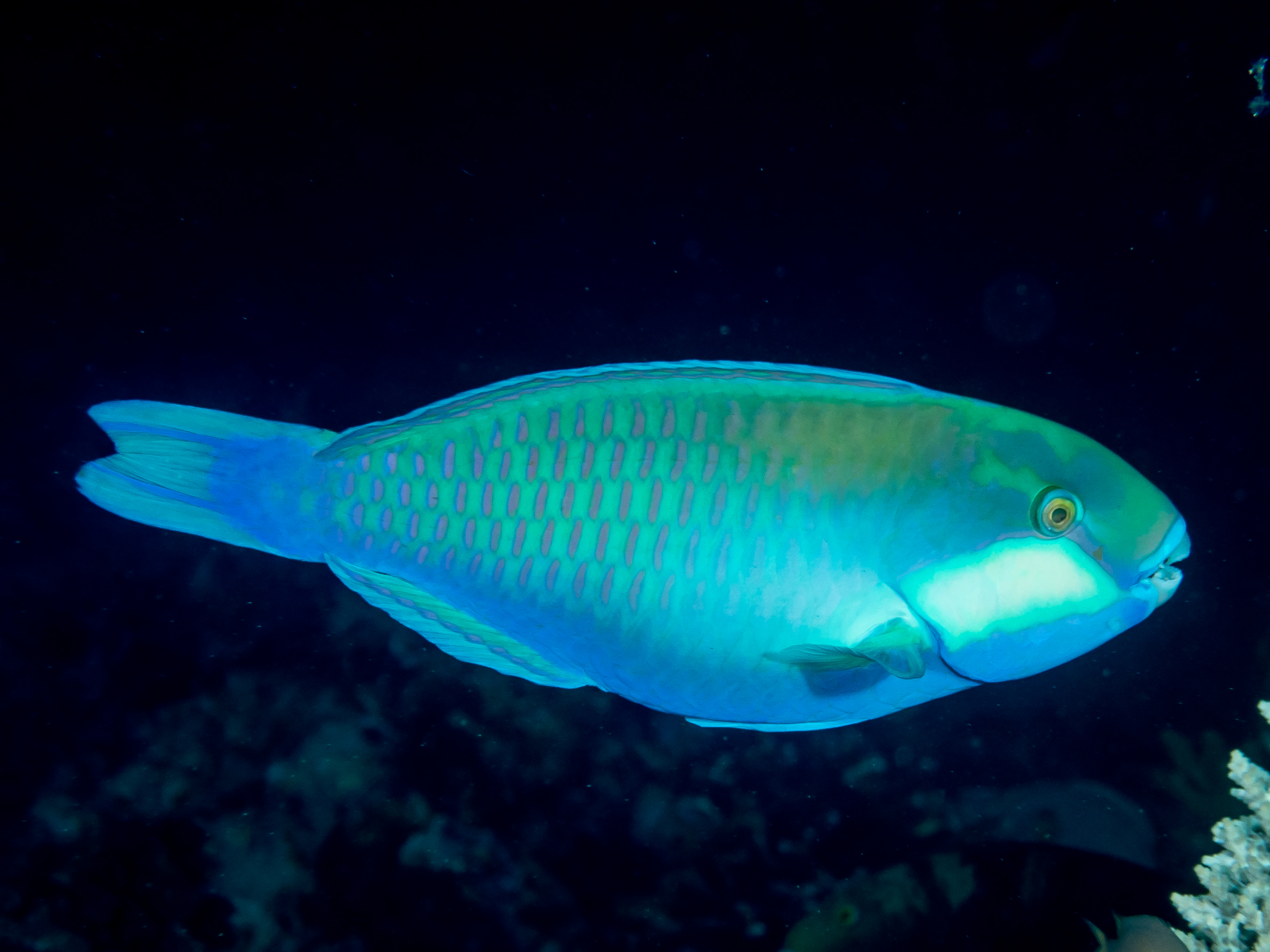
- Male
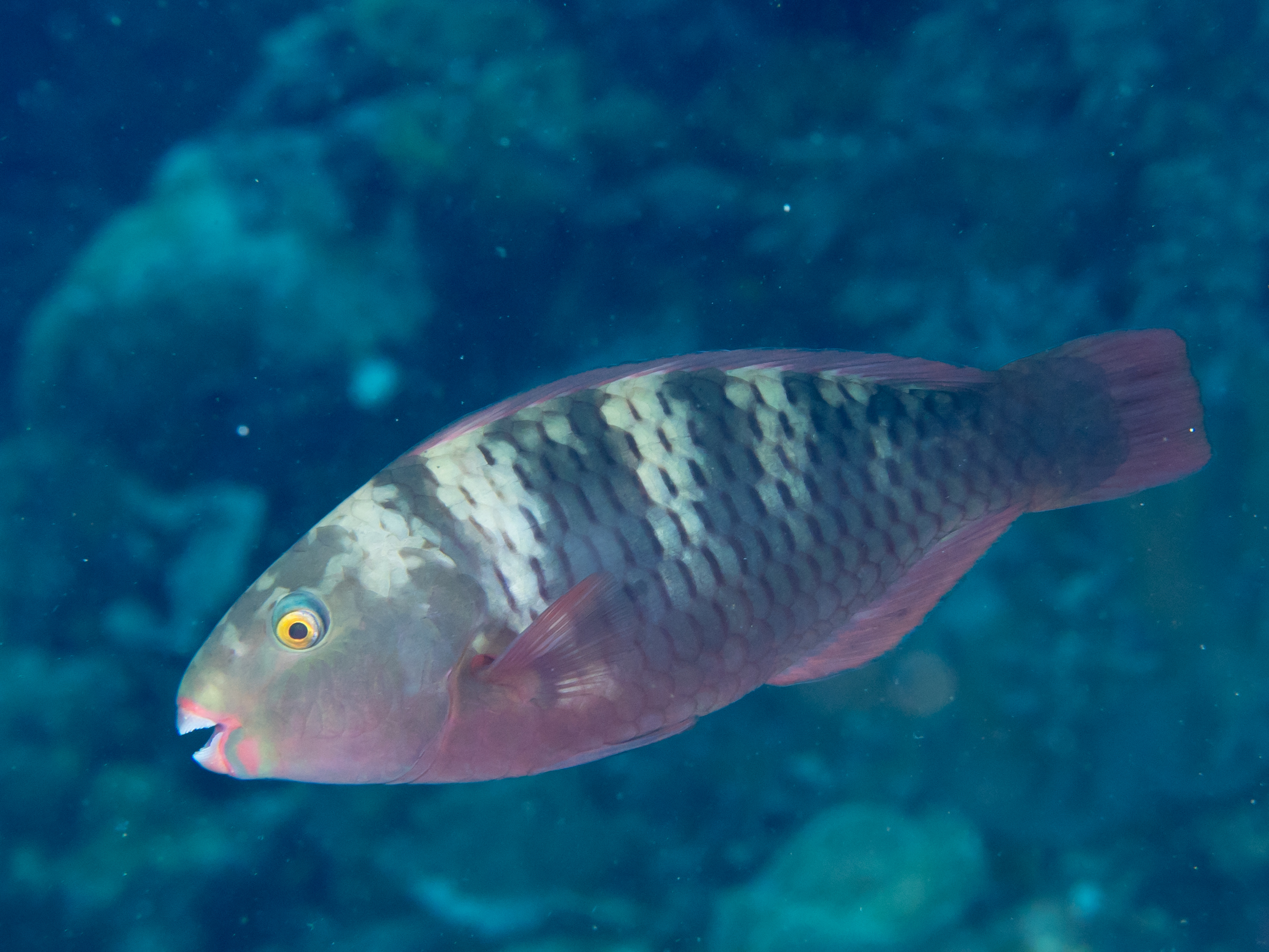
- Female

Conservation status
- Least Concern (IUCN 3.1)

Scientific classification
- Kingdom: Animalia
- Phylum: Chordata
- Class: Actinopterygii
- Order: Labriformes
- Family: Labridae
- Genus: Chlorurus
- Species: C. bleekeri

Binomial name
- Chlorurus bleekeri de Beaufort, 1940

Synonyms
- Callyodon bleekeri de Beaufort, 1940; Scarus bleekeri (de Beaufort, 1940)

= Chlorurus bleekeri =

Species of ray-finned fishes

Chlorurus bleekeri, commonly known as the Bleeker's parrotfish, is a species of marine fish in the family Scaridae.

Bleeker's parrotfish is widespread throughout the tropical waters of the central Indo-Pacific region. It feeds on filamentous algae. It is a medium-sized fish and can reach a maximum size of 49 cm length. Males are more colorful than females.

This parrotfish uses its beak-like teeth to scrape algae from coral rubble and reef surfaces.

Chlorurus bleekeri feeds on different food sources than nearby damselfish species, and the two do not compete directly for food.

== Etymology ==
The fish is named in honor of the Dutch medical doctor and ichthyologist Pieter Bleeker, who identified this species as Scarus quoyi in 1853.
