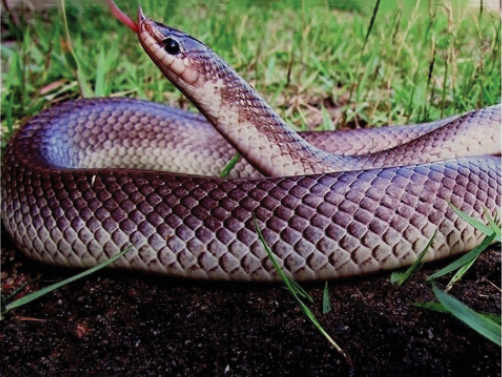

Conservation status
- Least Concern (IUCN 3.1)

Scientific classification
- Kingdom: Animalia
- Phylum: Chordata
- Class: Reptilia
- Order: Squamata
- Suborder: Serpentes
- Family: Colubridae
- Genus: Phimophis
- Species: P. guerini

Binomial name
- Phimophis guerini (A.M.C. Duméril, Bibron & A.H.A. Duméril, 1854)

Synonyms
- Rhinosimus guerini A.M.C. Duméril, Bibron & A.H.A. Duméril, 1854; Phimophis guerini — Cope, 1860; Oxyrhopus guerini — Boulenger, 1896; Rhinostoma scytaloides F. Werner, 1913; Rhinostoma guianense Serié, 1915; Rhinosimus amarali Mello, 1926; Pseudoboa guerini — Serié, 1936; Phimophis guerini — Bailey, 1962

= Phimophis guerini =

Species of snake

Phimophis guerini, also known commonly as the Argentine pampas snake, is a species of snake in the subfamily Dipsadinae of the family Colubridae. The species is endemic to South America.

== Etymology ==
The specific name, guerini, is in honor of French entomologist Félix Édouard Guérin-Méneville.

== Geographic distribution and habitat ==
P. guerini has been recorded from open areas and savannas in Argentina, Brazil, and Paraguay.

== Description ==
P. guerini may attain a snout-to-vent length (SVL) of 75 cm (30 in).

It has eight upper labials and nine or ten lower labials. The dorsal scales are in 21 rows anteriorly, 19 rows at midbody, and 17 rows posteriorly. The ventrals number about 200. The subcaudals number about 70 (a few more in males, a few less in females).

== Behavior ==
P. guerini is terrestrial and nocturnal.

== Diet ==
P. guerini preys predominately upon lizards, but also occasionally upon small mammals.

== Reproduction ==
P. guerini is oviparous. Clutch size is three to seven eggs.
