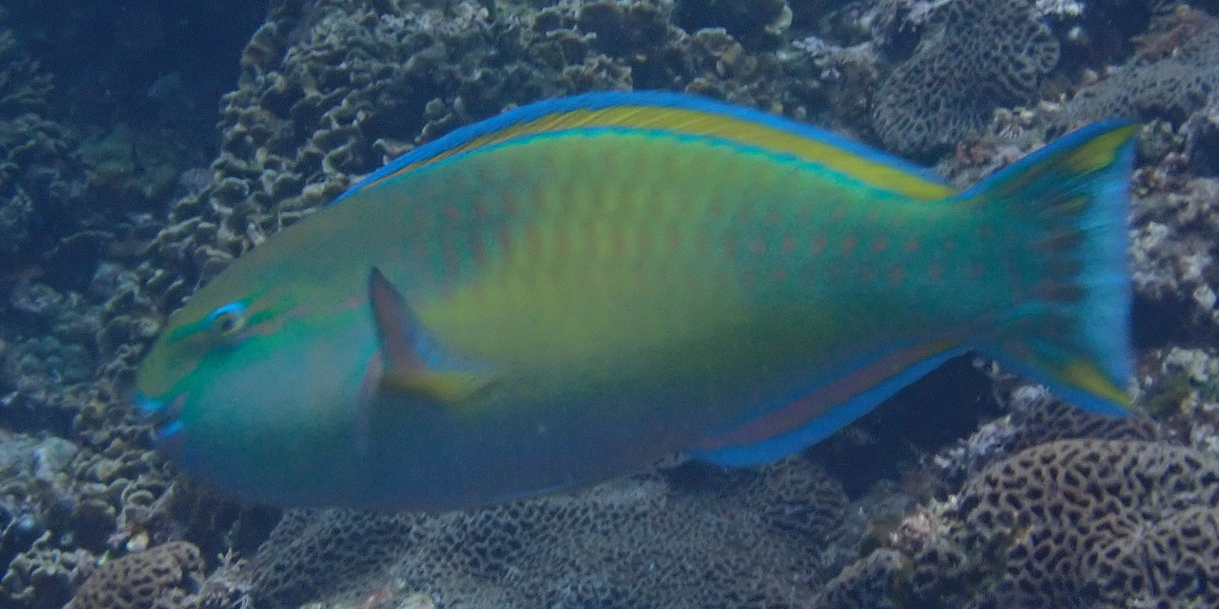

Conservation status
- Least Concern (IUCN 3.1)

Scientific classification
- Kingdom: Animalia
- Phylum: Chordata
- Class: Actinopterygii
- Division: Teleostei
- Order: Labriformes
- Family: Labridae
- Genus: Chlorurus
- Species: C. japanensis

Binomial name
- Chlorurus japanensis (Bloch, 1789)

Synonyms
- Scarus japanensis Bloch, 1789; Xanothon capistratoides (non Bleeker, 1847); Scarus capistratoides (non Bleeker, 1847); Scarus pyrrhurus (Jordan & Seale, 1906); Callyodon pyrrhurus Jordan & Seale, 1906; Scarus blochii Valenciennes, 1840; Scarus viridis Bloch, 1790; Callyodon abacurus Jordan & Seale, 1906; Callyodon japanensis (Bloch, 1789)

= Chlorurus japanensis =

Species of ray-finned fishes

Chlorurus japanensis, also known as yellow-blotched parrotfish, redtail parrotfish, palecheek parrotfish, pale bullethead parrotfish and Japanese parrotfish, is a species of marine ray-finned fish, a parrotfish from the family Scaridae.

== Distribution ==
This species is widespread in Pacific Ocean. It is found especially in the region which extends from Ryukyu Islands to Australia. It also has been recently reported from Tonga

== Description ==
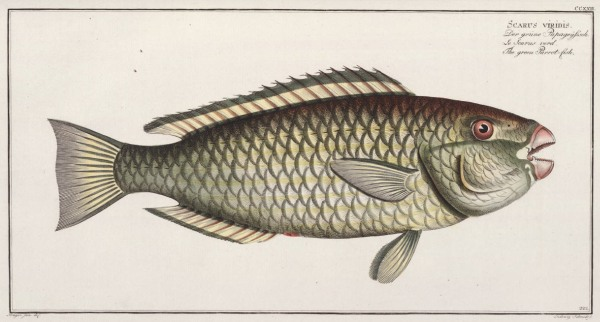

This species can be distinguished by having a total of nine dorsal spines, three dorsal soft rays, three anal spines and nine anal soft rays. The body shape of this species is normal or fusiform. This species is further distinguished by having four median predorsal scales. There are two scale rows on cheek and conical teeth is absent on side of lower dental plate. It has zero to two conical teeth on upper plate of initial phase and often two on terminal males. Lips slightly covers the dental plates. Caudal fin in subadult is slightly rounded to truncate and slightly emarginate in terminal males. The color of male fishes are distinctly bicolored, with purple-brown anterior, and oblique division to pale yellow posterior. Females are entirely dark brown with red-orange tail.

== Biology ==
This species usually inhabits seaward coral reefs and rocky reefs. They prefer reefs with rich coral habitat. They feed on benthic algae. They may occur in small groups. They are caught mainly with traps, nets and other types of artisanal gear.

== Reproduction ==
This is an oviparous species. They usually exhibit distinct pairing during breeding.

== Relationship with humans ==
This species is generally harmless to humans. These are used commercially in fisheries and aquariums.
