= Chlorurus oedema =

Scientific classification
- Kingdom: Animalia
- Phylum: Chordata
- Class: Actinopterygii
- Order: Labriformes
- Family: Labridae
- Genus: Chlorurus
- Species: C. oedema

Binomial name
- Chlorurus oedema Snyder, 1909

Species of ray-finned fishes

Chlorurus oedema is a species of fish from the genus Chlorurus.
