= Herbert A. Gill =

American civil servant and businessman (1856–1936)

United States Commissioner of Fish and Fisheries Acting
- In office September 1, 1895 – March 30, 1896
- President: Grover Cleveland
- Preceded by: Marshall McDonald
- Succeeded by: John J. Brice

Personal details
- Born: October 12, 1856 New York, New York, U.S.
- Died: November 27, 1936 (aged 80) Washington, D.C., U.S.
- Resting place: Oak Hill Cemetery, Washington, D.C.
- Spouse: Monita Wederstrandt Smith
- Children: 4

Herbert Abraham Gill (October 12, 1856 – November 27, 1936) was an American civil servant, auditor, stenographer, and businessman. Gill served as the acting commissioner of the United States Commission of Fish and Fisheries from 1895 to 1896. He was also the founder and president of H.A. Gill & Son Inc., a real estate development company in the Washington, D.C. area.

== Early life and family ==
Gill was born on October 12, 1856, in New York City. He was married to Monita Wederstrandt Smith and they had four children.

== Career ==
=== United States Fish Commission ===
In the late 1870s, Gill began working for the Smithsonian Institution as a stenographer, and began working for the United States Fish Commission in May 1876 as a disbursing agent and auditing officer. In the 1880s, Gill was appointed as chief clerk of the commission. In 1880, Gill helped to plan the U.S. government's involvement in the Berlin Fishery Expedition. In 1890, Gill testified to the U.S. Senate Subcommittee on Fisheries during their investigation of the commission.

Following the death of Commissioner Marshall McDonald in 1895, Gill assumed the role of Acting Commissioner. Gill served in the post until the appointment of John J. Brice the following year. While in the post, Gill helped to establish the commission's Division of Propagation and Distribution of Food Fishes. He also worked with the U.S. Congress to regulate Alaskan salmon fishing with closed seasons, spawning escapement requirements, and net restrictions.

=== Business career ===
Gill was an active member of the Cosmos Club from 1879 to 1884. In 1888, Gill began buying and selling land in Brookland, a new suburban development in Washington, D.C. During that period, he acquired over forty land deeds and began developing properties. In 1892, he sold his land in Rosemount Park to the U.S. government for $1 to help establish Rock Creek Park.

In 1908, he formally established H.A. Gill & Son Inc. with his son Theodore. In 1917, Gill was a founding board member of the Washington Real Estate Board to institute standard real estate fees and a code of ethics. Gill was also the auditor of the American Association for the Advancement of Science for several years.

== Death ==
Gill died in 1936 aged 80. He is interred at Oak Hill Cemetery.
