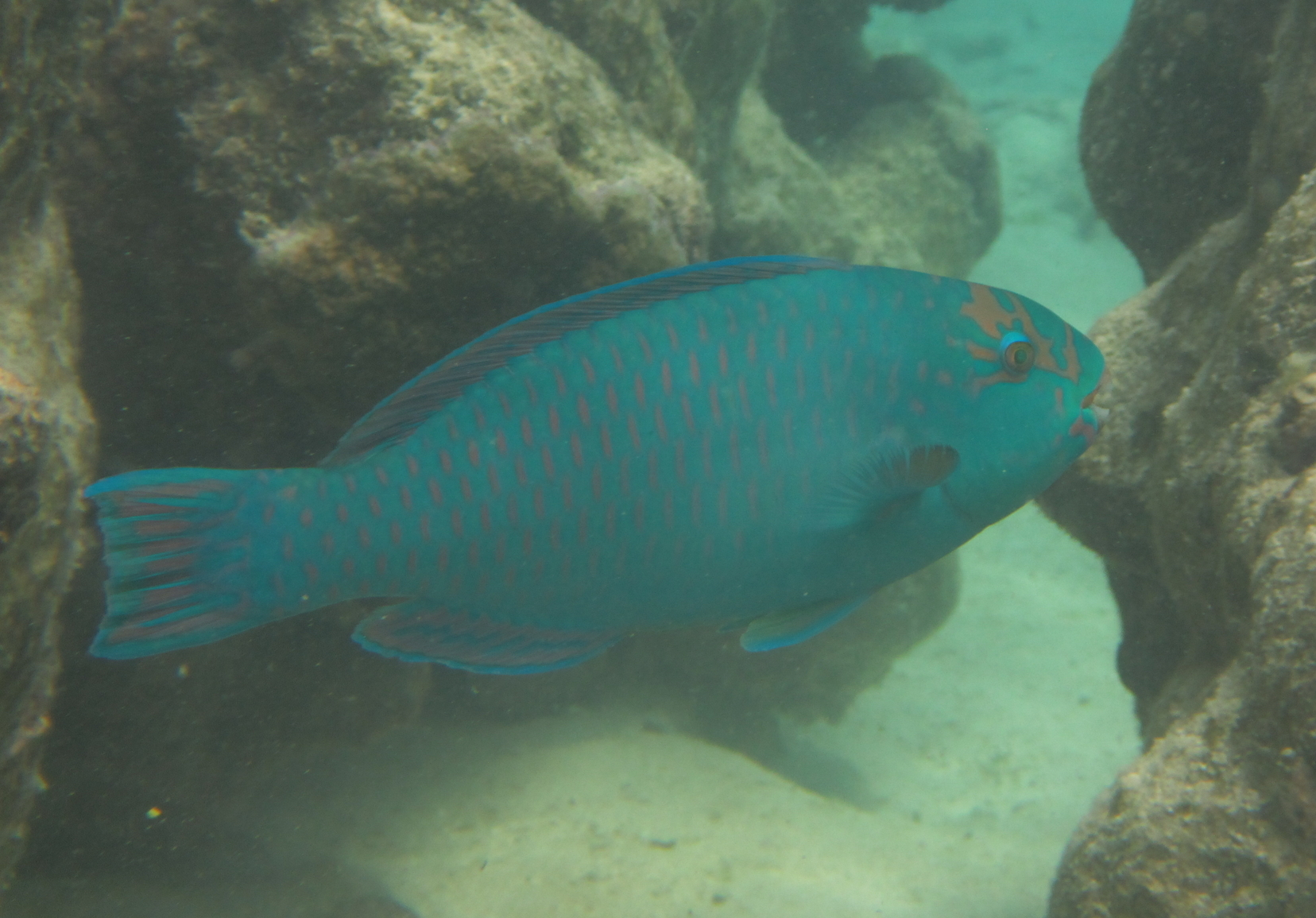

Conservation status
- Least Concern (IUCN 3.1)

Scientific classification
- Kingdom: Animalia
- Phylum: Chordata
- Class: Actinopterygii
- Division: Teleostei
- Order: Labriformes
- Family: Labridae
- Genus: Chlorurus
- Species: C. frontalis

Binomial name
- Chlorurus frontalis (Valenciennes, 1840)

Synonyms
- Scarus frontalis Valenciennes, 1840

= Chlorurus frontalis =

Species of ray-finned fishes

Chlorurus frontalis, also known as Pacific slopehead parrotfish, is a species of marine ray-finned fish, a parrotfish from the family Scaridae.

== Distribution ==
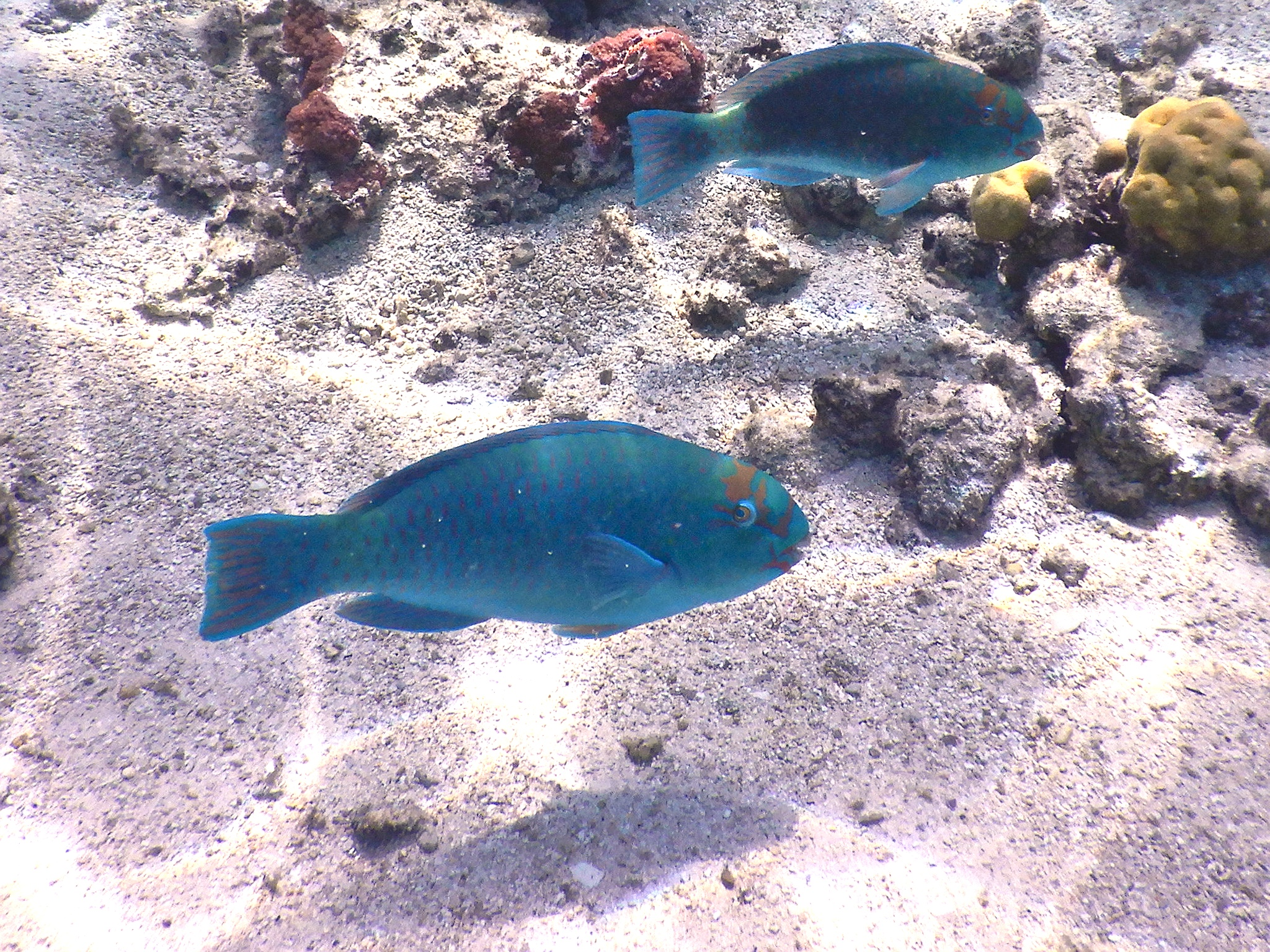
At the Cook Islands

The main habitat of this species is in north to the Ryukyu Islands to the Line and Ducie islands and south to the Great Barrier Reef, Pacific Ocean.

This species is also found in Wake Island, Tonga, Tahiti, Solomon Island, Pitcairn Island, Samoa, Papua New Guinea, Northern Marianas, Marshall Islands, Palau, New Caledonia, Micronesia, French Polynesia, Kiribati, Palau, Guam, Cook Island, Australia, American Samoa, Taiwan, Vietnam, Japan, Philippines, Palau, Coral Sea, Kuroshio Current, Sulu Sea, Celebes Sea, South China Sea, Yellow Sea, and Tubbataha Reefs.

== Description ==
Chlorurus frontalis has nine dorsal spines, ten dorsal soft rays, three anal spines and nine anal soft rays. Coloration changes slowly with growth. The light green patch on the caudal peduncle is present on individuals as small as 15 cm (5.9 in) and the distinctive tan facial markings are on most individuals above 20 cm (7.9 in). Large males develop a near-vertical forehead profile and long lobes and a well-developed lunate caudal fin.

Unlike most parrotfish, C. frontalis does not display much sexual dichromatism; initial phase and terminal phase colouration are very similar.

== Biology and environment ==
=== Biology ===
This species is often seen in small schools on exposed reef flats and seaward reefs. They feed on benthic algae.

=== Environment ===
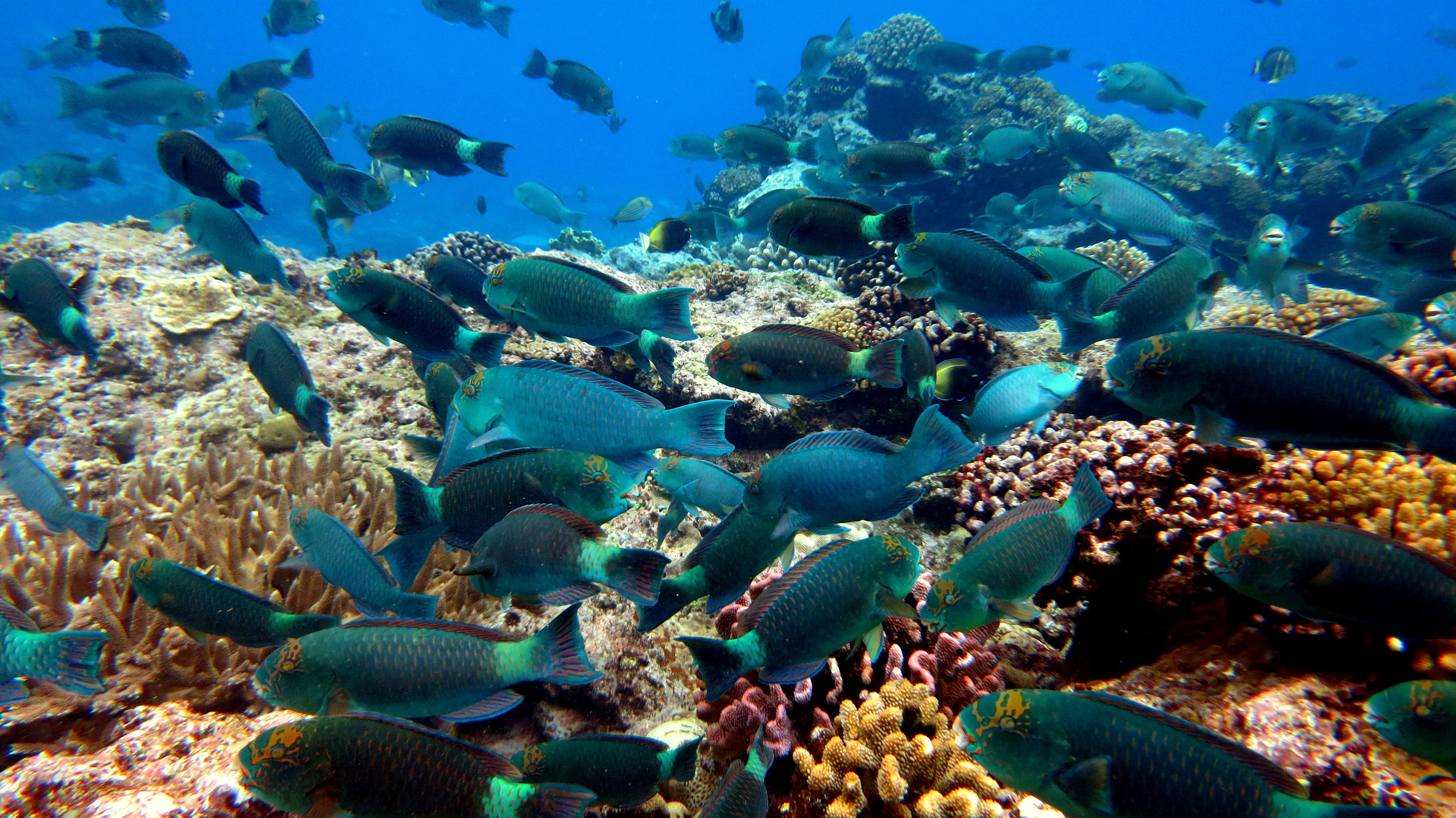
Chlorurus frontalis in a reef

It is a tropical, marine, reef-associated fish. This species is usually found 10m to 40m below sea level. Its ideal range is between 30°N to 25°S.

== Reproduction ==
This species is monogamous and oviparous. They pair up distinctly during breeding.

== Relationship with humans ==
This species is sometimes kept in aquariums. There have been reports of ciguatera poisoning after eating the fish.

== See also ==
- List of species in the genus Chlorurus
