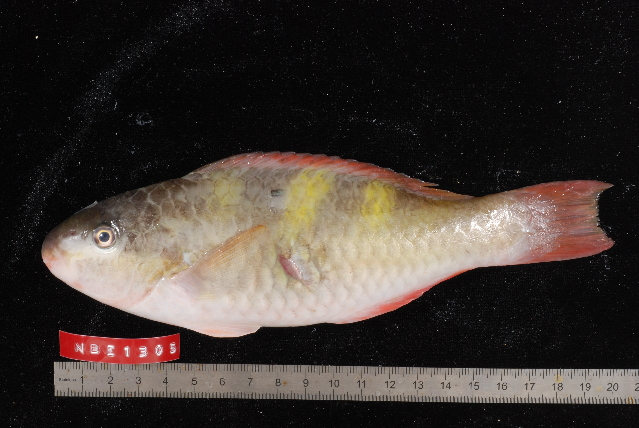

Conservation status
- Least Concern (IUCN 3.1)

Scientific classification
- Kingdom: Animalia
- Phylum: Chordata
- Class: Actinopterygii
- Order: Labriformes
- Family: Labridae
- Genus: Scarus
- Species: S. scaber

Binomial name
- Scarus scaber Valenciennes, 1840

Synonyms
- Callyodon scaber (Valenciennes, 1840); Scarus pectoralis Valenciennes, 1840; Callyodon pectoralis (Valenciennes, 1840)

= Scarus scaber =

Species of fish

Scarus scaber, the five-saddle parrotfish or dusky-capped parrotfish, is a species of marine ray-finned fish, a parrotfish, in the family Scaridae. It is native to Indian Ocean.

== Description ==
This species grows to a maximum 37 cm in length and 900 g in weight.

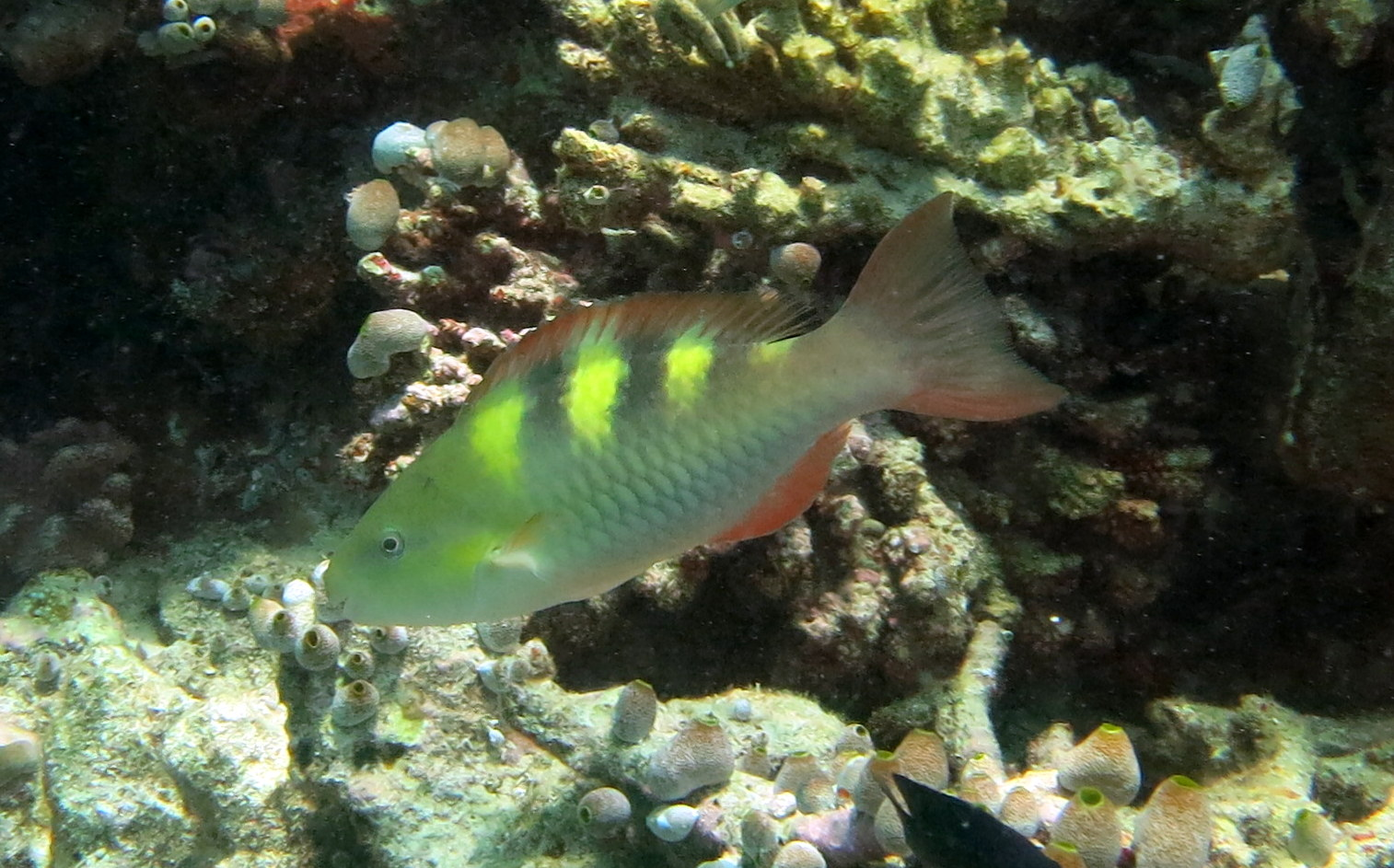
Initial phase (female)

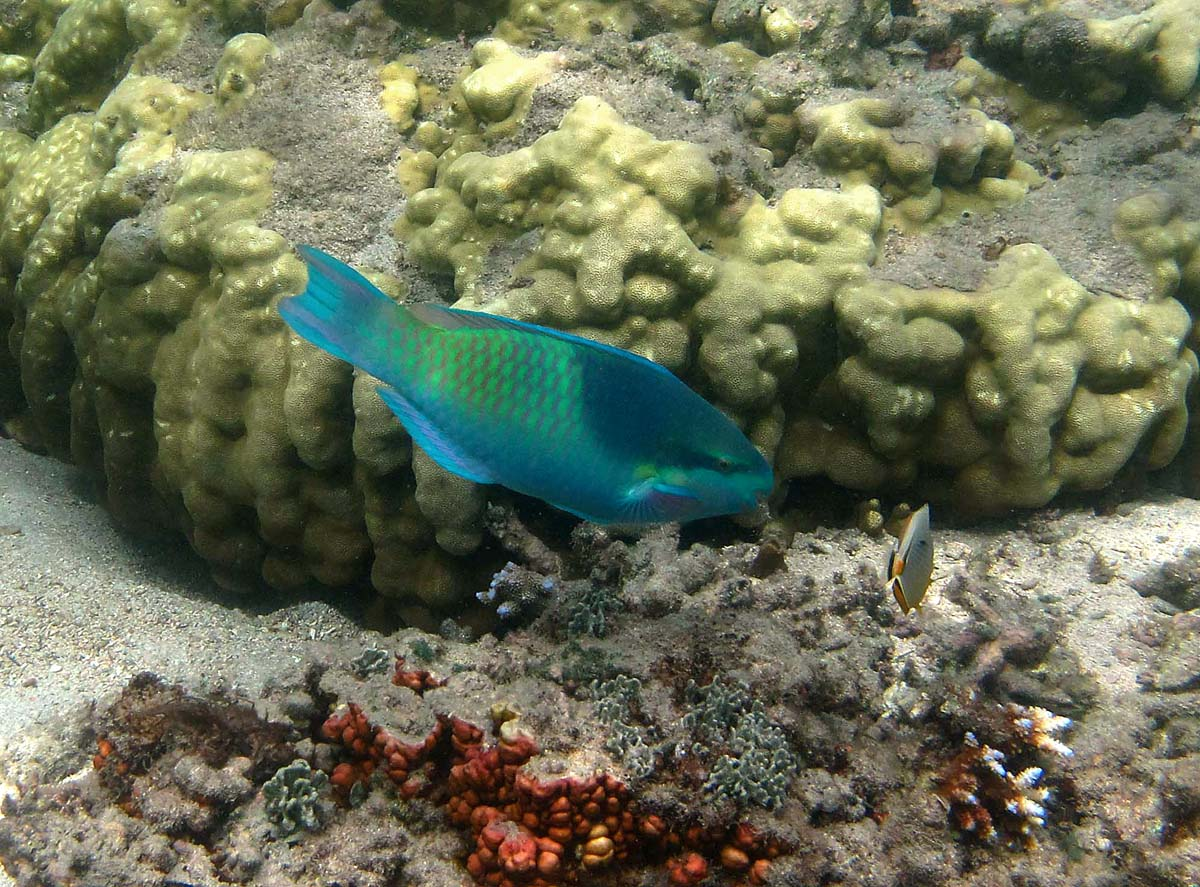
Final phase (male)

== Distribution ==
This species is widely distributed in the Indian Ocean (and around the islands therein) from western Thailand and northwest Indonesia in the east (southwards to Cocos-Keeling), and west to the coast of Africa (as far south as Natal and north to Red Sea and Gulf of Aden).

== Habitat ==
This species is either solitary, or forms small schools.
