= Franz Hermann Troschel =

German zoologist (1810-1882)

- Born: 10 October 1810; Spandau
- Died: 6 November 1882 (aged 72)
- Education: University of Berlin
- Known for: Identification and classification of various fish, molluscs and fish species
- Scientific career
- Fields: Zoology
- Workplaces: Natural History Museum of Berlin; University of Bonn
- Author abbrev. (zoology): Troschel

Franz Hermann Troschel (10 October 1810 – 6 November 1882) was a German zoologist born in Spandau.

He studied mathematics and natural history at the University of Berlin, where he was awarded his doctorate in 1834. From 1840 to 1849 he was an assistant to Martin Lichtenstein at the Natural History Museum of Berlin. In 1849 he became a professor of zoology and natural history at the University of Bonn. In 1851 he became a member of the Academy of Sciences Leopoldina.

Troschel is remembered for the identification and classification of species in the fields of malacology, ichthyology and herpetology.

== Taxon named in his honor ==
A few of the species that contain his name are

- Troschel's sea star (Evasterias troschelii),
- Troschel's murex (Murex troschelii), and a
- freshwater snail (Bithynia troschelii).

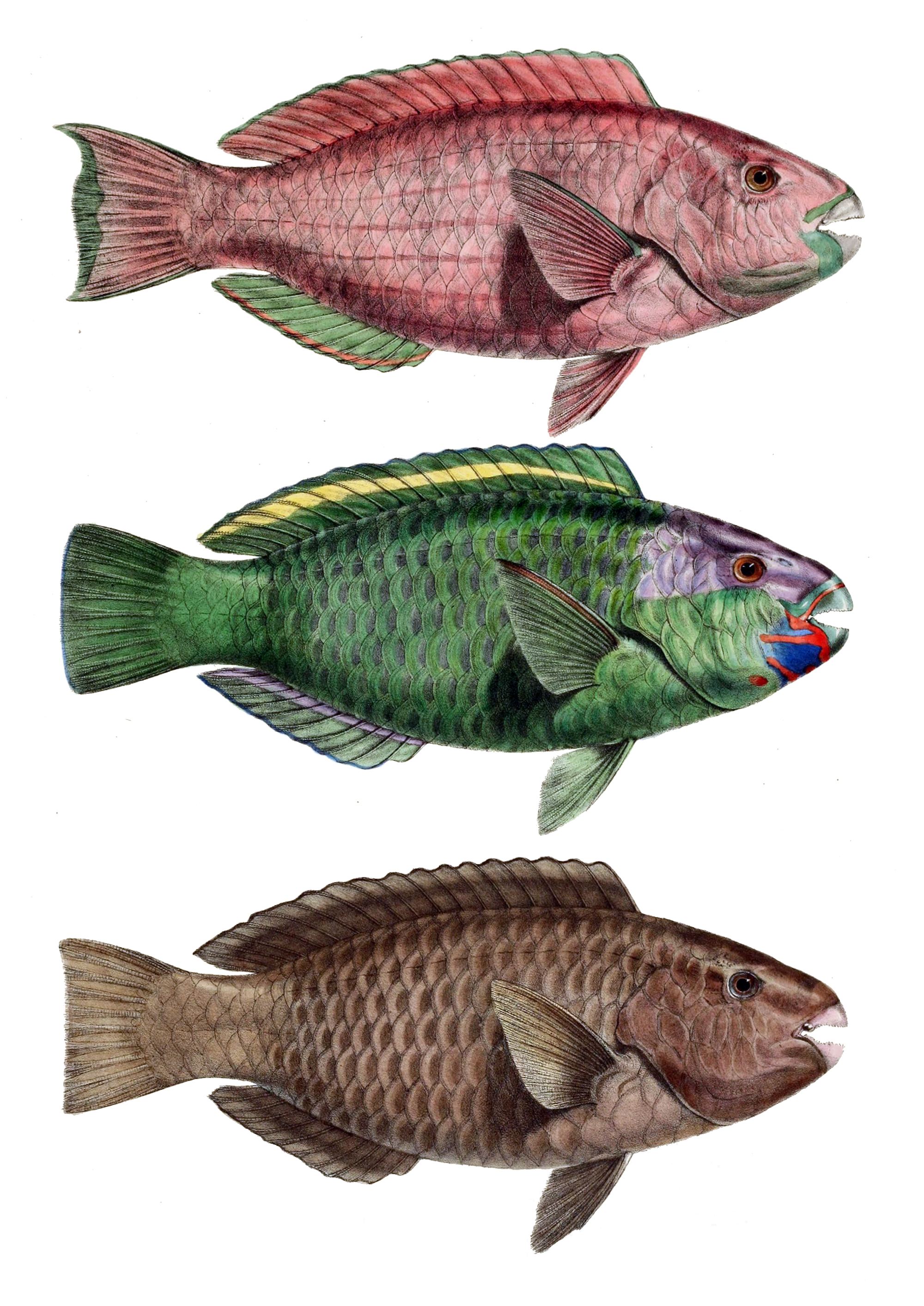
Different variety of Troschel's parrotfish.

- Chlorurus troschelii, commonly known as Troschel's parrotfish, is a species of marine ray-finned fish, a parrotfish from the family Scaridae. It is native to the eastern Indian Ocean, where it lives in coral reefs.

== Bibliography ==
(incomplete)

- System der Asteriden. Braunschweig: Friedrich Vieweg und Sohn. 1842 (With Johannes Peter Müller (1801–1858)).
- Über die Bedeutsamkeit des naturgeschichtlichen Unterrichts. Berlin 1845.
- Horae ichthyologicae. Berlin 1845–49, 3 volumes (With Johannes Peter Müller).
- Handbuch der Zoologie, third to seventh edition, Berlin 1848/1853/1859/1864/1871, (original authors Arend Friedrich August Wiegmann (1802–1841) and Johann Friedrich Ruthe (1788–1859)). Digital 6th edition by the University and State Library Düsseldorf
- Troschel F. H. 1856–1879. Das Gebiß der Schnecken zur Begründung einer natürlichen Klassifikation. Berlin 1856–1879, two volumes. Volume 1 and volume 2 were published in parts:
  - 1856. Volume 1, part 1: 1–72, plates 1–4.
  - (before 30 October) 1857. 1(2): 73–112, plates 5–8.
  - 1858. 1(3): 113–152, plates 9–12.
  - 1861. 1(4): 153–196, plates 13–16.
  - 1863. 1(5): i–viii, 197–252, plates 17–20.
  - (December) 1865. 2(1): 1–48, plates 1–4.
  - (December) 1867. 2(2): 49–96, plates 5–8.
  - 1869. 2(3): 97–132, plates 9–12.
  - 1875. 2(4): 133–180, plates 13–16.
  - (18 September) 1878. 2(5): 181–216, plates 17–20.
  - (2 September) 1879. 2(6): 217–246, plates 21–24.
  - Two last parts 2(7) and 2(8) were continued by Johannes Thiele and published in 1891 and 1893.
- Troschel was the editor of Archiv für Naturgeschichte from volume 15 (1849) to 48 (1882), Berlin, Nicolaische Verlagsbuchhandlung (Volume 35, part 2, online).

== Taxon described by him ==
- See Category:Taxa named by Franz Hermann Troschel
