= Hol Chan Marine Reserve =

Marine reserve off the coast of Belize

- IUCN category IV (habitat/species management area)
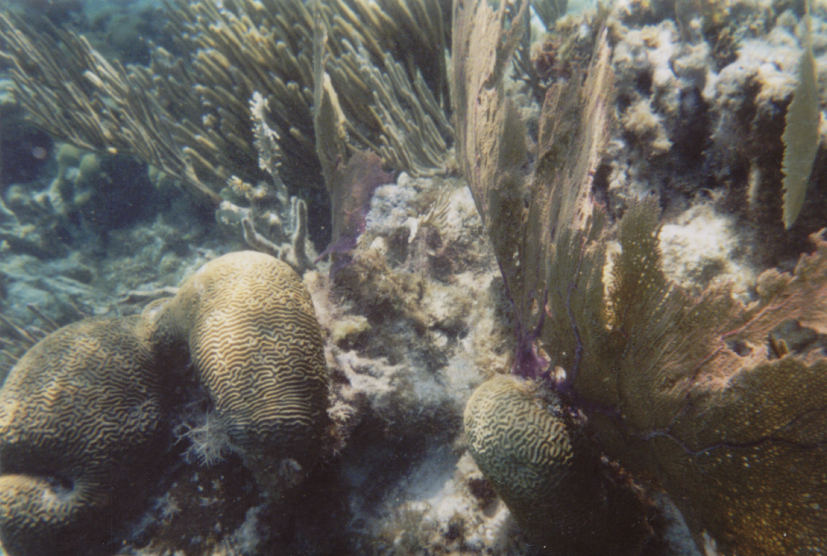
- Corals lining the Hol Chan Cut

- Location within Belize
- Location: Gulf of Honduras, Belize
- Nearest city: San Pedro Town
- Coordinates: 17.869°N 88.003°W
- Area: 18 km^{2} (6.9 sq mi)
- Established: 1987
- Visitors: 36,887 (in 2001)
- Governing body: Hol Chan Marine Reserve Trust Fund Committee
- Website: www.holchanmarinereserve.org

Hol Chan Marine Reserve is a marine reserve close to Ambergris Caye and Caye Caulker, off the coast of Belize. It covers approximately 18 km² (4,448 acres) of coral reefs, seagrass beds, and mangrove forest. Hol Chan is Mayan for "little channel".

== History ==
In the early 1980s fish stocks in the area around Hol Chan began to dwindle and at the same time tourism to the Cayes began to increase. Disputes arose over access to the Hol Chan cut, a natural break in the reef, which was a productive fishing area but also popular with snorkelers and divers. Proposed fishing bans were rejected and in the mid 1980s public consultation over establishing a marine protected area began. Reserve status was also called for by international organizations such as the New York Zoological Society (NYZS) and Peace Corps, due to the unique formation of the channel, the abundant fishery resources (including conch and lobster) and the feasibility of including an interlinked system of coral reef, sea grass and mangrove habitats in this area.

Between 1985 and 1987, Janet Gibson worked to establish the a protected reserve campaigning with citizens, businesses, fishermen, and the government of Belize and educating them on the need for the project. In 1986, she wrote the Hol Chan Marine Reserve Draft Management Plan to develop the feasibility for the project. Based on environmentalist's efforts, the reserve was established in July 1987 with funding from WWF and USAID, after the draft management plan was approved by the Fisheries ministry and the local fishermen's co-operative. Active enforcement of the regulations began in 1989 and charging for entrance to Zone A started in 1990. The reserve was originally divided into three areas:

- Zone A which includes the inside and outside of the reef (part of the Belize Barrier Reef). No fishing is permitted in this area, but snorkeling and diving are permitted on payment of a fee.
- Zone B covers the sea grass beds inside the reef. Both commercial and sport fishing are allowed in this area with a license.
- Zone C covers the mangroves swamps of southern Ambergris Caye. No commercial fishing is allowed in this zone, but sport fishing may be carried out under license.

In 1999 the adjoining area of Shark Ray Alley was added as zone D of the reserve. This is a second charged snorkeling area, but commercial and sport fishing are permitted in some parts of this zone on obtaining a license.

== Features ==
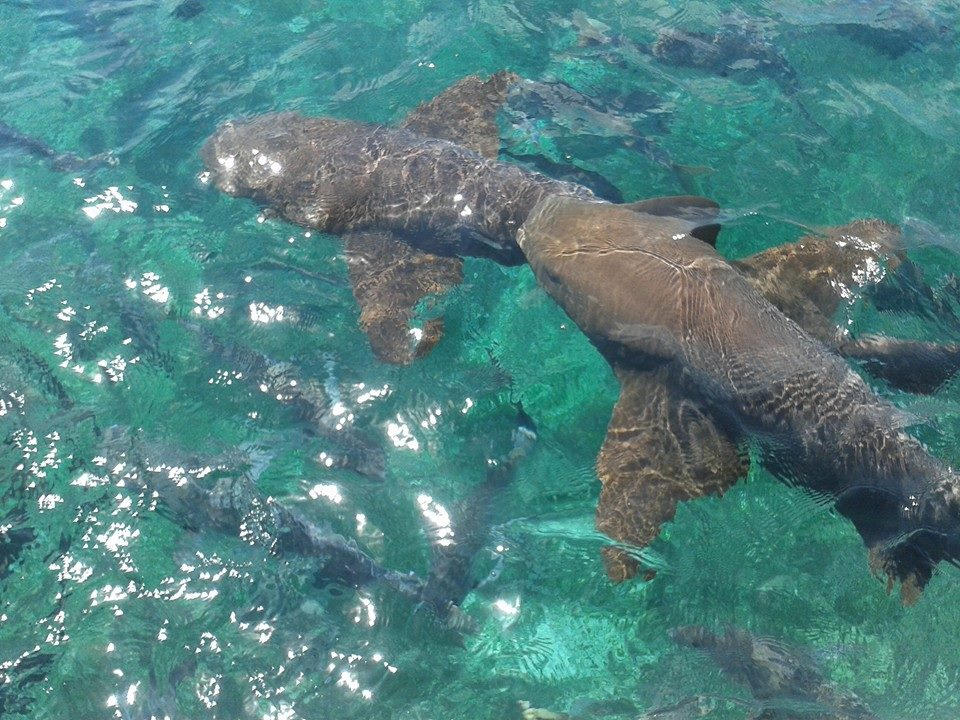
Nurse Sharks swimming at Hol Chan Marine Reserve

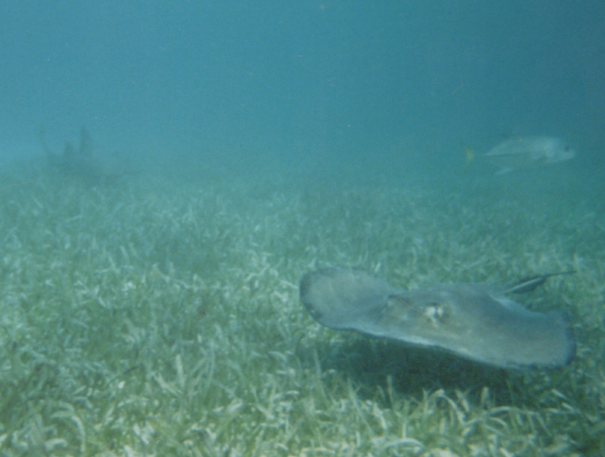
Nurse sharks and Southern stingrays are a draw for tourists.

Zone A mostly consists of the Hol Chan Cut, a natural break in the reef. The cut is approximately 23 m (75 ft) wide and 9 m (30 ft) deep (Hol Chan is Mayan for "little channel"), and is rich in marine life. Around the cut the sea can be as shallow 1.5 m (5 ft). On the outside of the reef the channel slopes into the Caribbean, and on the inside of the reef tails off into the shallows. Zone B has Boca Ciega Blue Hole, a sinkhole, which opens into a larger underwater cavern. It is dangerous for inexperienced divers, so is not regularly visited. Zone D, Shark Ray Alley, is a shallow sandy-bottomed area inside the reef, unremarkable except that it is a gathering place for sharks and stingrays. It was an area traditionally used by fishermen to clean their nets before returning to port, and the abundance of food that entered the water as a result attracted the sharks and rays to feed. The presence of these fish was actively encouraged as a tourist attraction — being fed by local tour guides; the shallow clear waters make it an ideal spot for snorkelers to observe the creatures.

== Wildlife ==
Hol Chan Cut is open to the sea beyond the reef, so allows marine creatures to travel from the outside of the reef to the inside and vice versa. Over 160 species of fish have been recorded in the reserve, along with forty types of coral, five species of sponge, two sea grasses, three species of sea turtle and three marine mammals: the short-beaked common dolphin, pantropical spotted dolphin and West Indian manatee. Spotted eagle rays and southern stingrays are common at the bottom of the channel. Lobsters, moray eels and sea anemones live among the rocky outcrops, and some of the many corals include brain coral, elkhorn coral, and finger coral. Jacks, groupers, snappers and barracuda are all common.

The mangrove forests act as nurseries for many fish species. Adult blue striped grunts, French grunts, white grunts, gray snappers, French angelfish, gray angelfish, and seahorses may also be found among the mangroves. The seagrass beds have parrotfish, hogfish, and occasional turtles. Manatees are rare visitors. Shark Ray Alley has nurse sharks, rays, and occasionally other fish.

== Management and conservation ==
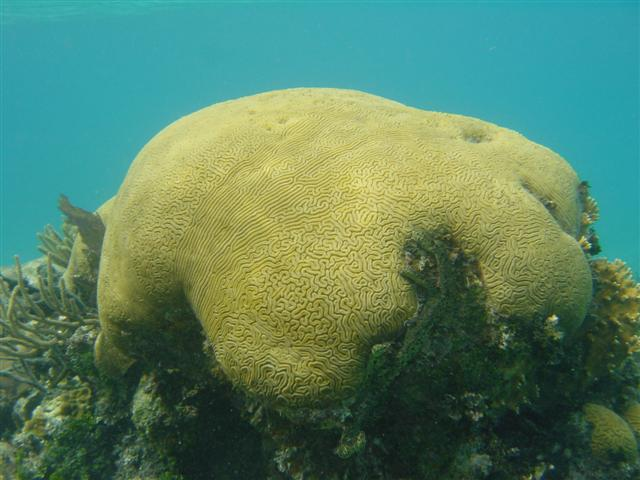
Brain coral

The reserve is managed by the Hol Chan Marine Reserve Trust Fund Committee, which replaced the informal advisory committee which ran the reserve until 1994. The majority of the funds for the park's upkeep is generated from the fees charged to visitors for access to Zones A and D. These are not collected directly but instead via a yearly licensing scheme which applies to the boats of tour guides. Funding from the WWF ended in 1995. The establishment of the reserve in 1987 included four main goals. These were:

- Preserving an area of the coral reef ecosystem
- Providing recreational and tourist services while maintaining the utility of the area for fisheries
- Providing an opportunity for education and research within the park
- Conserving genetic resources

While fish stocks have increased, the fishing industry has continued to decline, and the management is faced with other problems: clearance of mangroves and other habitats in areas adjacent to the reserve, which affects the reserve but over which the committee has no control. There is an increasing numbers of tourists, which increases revenue to the reserve through fees. However, this situation puts pressure on the facilities both within the reserve and the nearby towns of San Pedro and Caye Caulker. There is a threat to the reserve as the amount of tourists are affecting the life of the coral.
