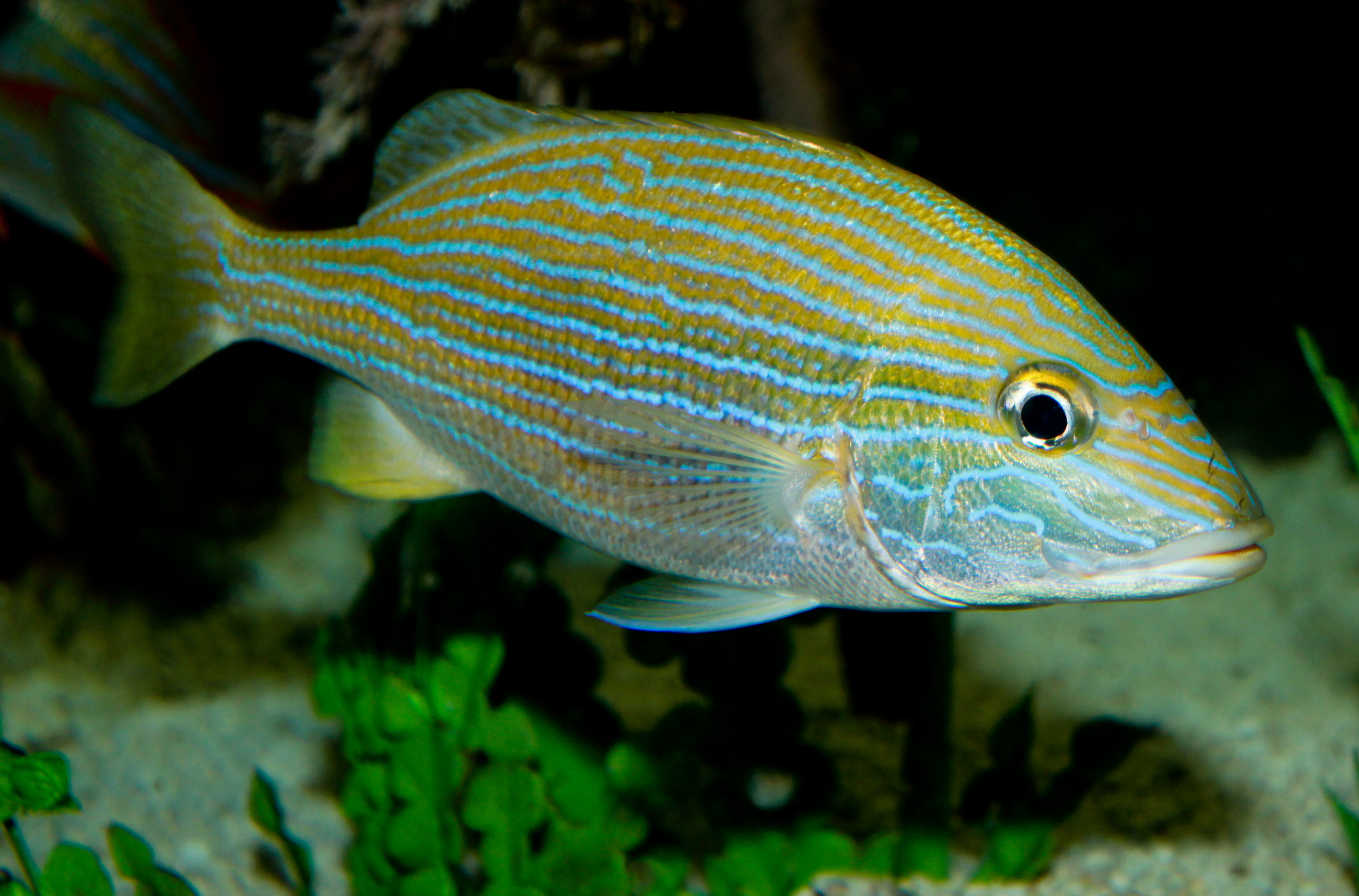
- Haemulon sciurus

Scientific classification
- Kingdom: Animalia
- Phylum: Chordata
- Class: Actinopterygii
- Order: Acanthuriformes
- Family: Haemulidae
- Subfamily: Haemulinae
- Genus: Haemulon; G. Cuvier, 1829

Type species
- Haemulon elegans G. Cuvier, 1829

Synonyms
- Anarmostus Scudder, 1863; Bathystoma Scudder, 1863; Brachygenys Poey, 1868; Diabasis Desmarest, 1823; Inermia Poey, 1860; Isaciops Miles, 1953; Lythrulon D. S. Jordan & Swain, 1884; Orthostoechus T. N. Gill, 1862

= Haemulon =

Genus of fishes

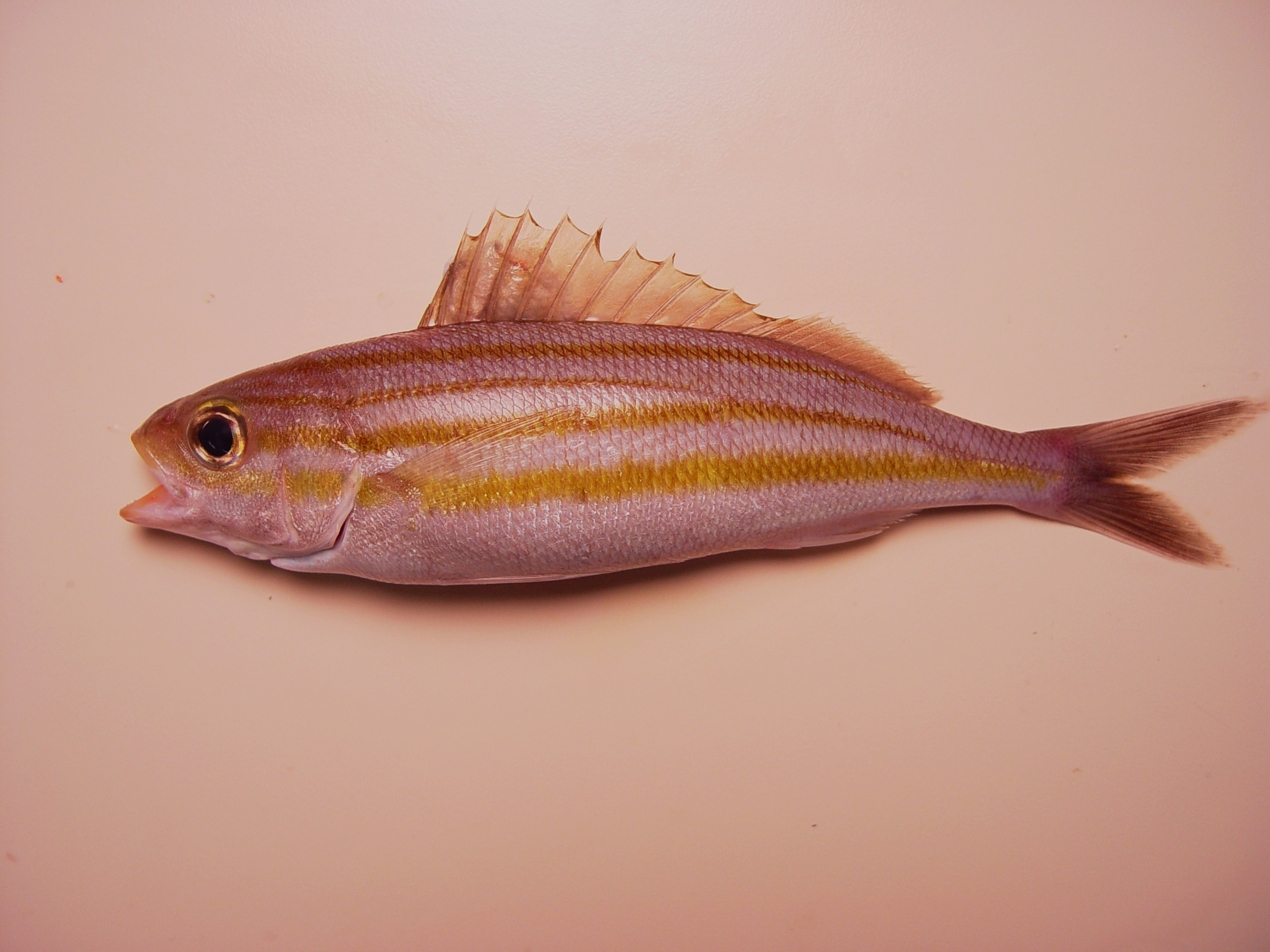
Haemulon striatum

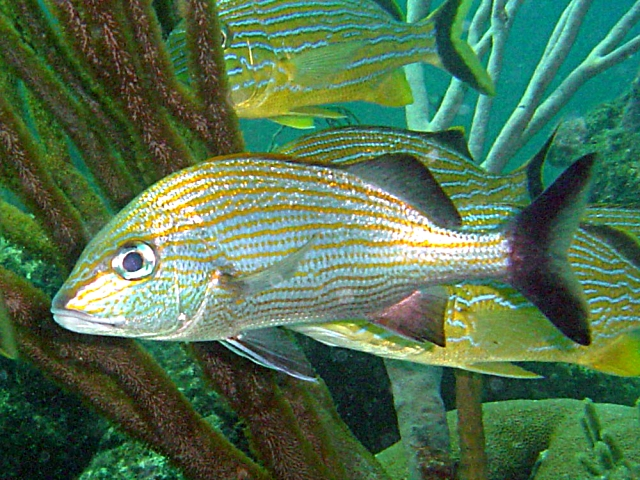
Haemulon carbonarium

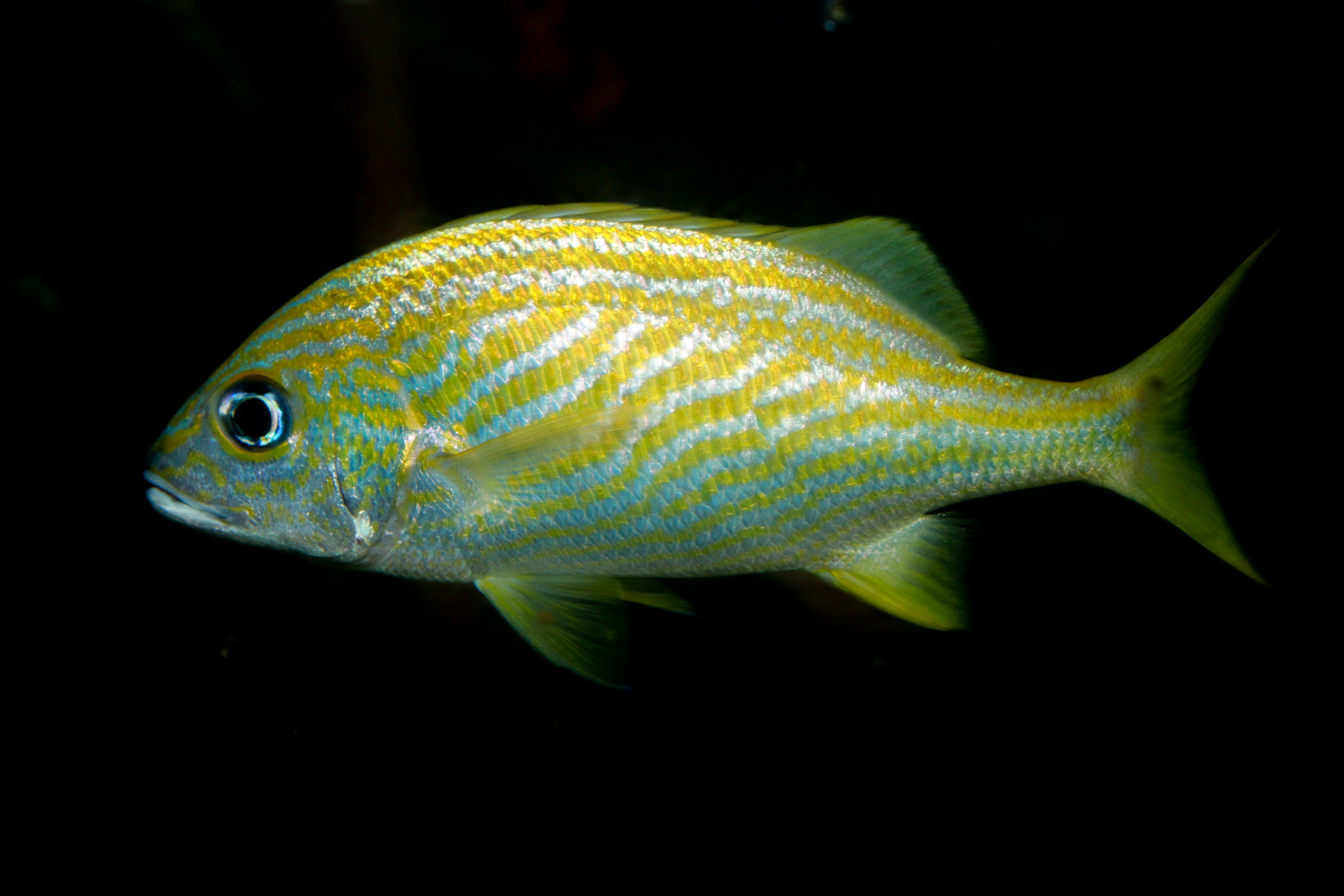
Haemulon flavolineatum

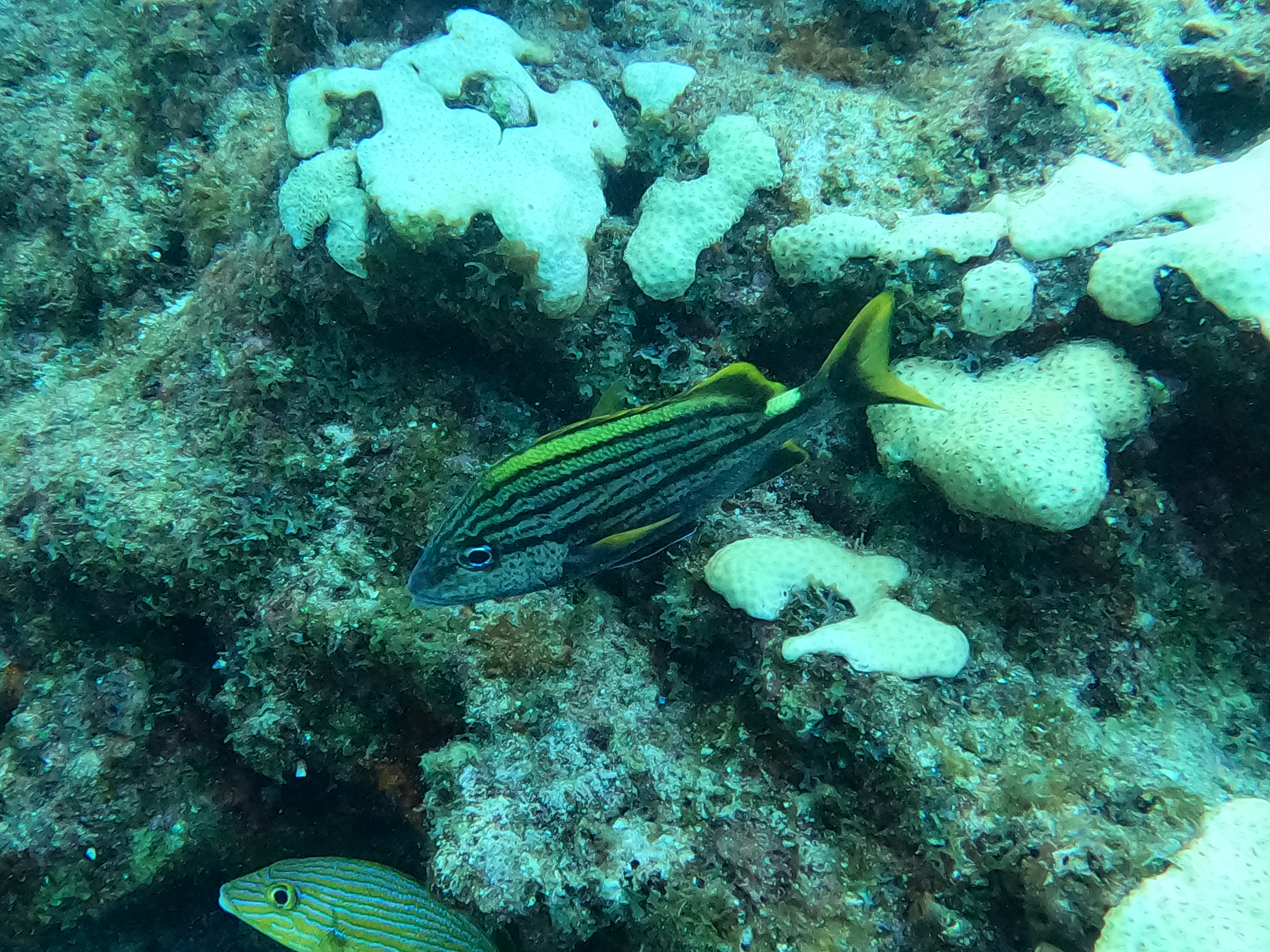
Haemulon macrostomum

Haemulon is a genus of fish in the grunt family known as the scaled-fin grunts. Most are found in the western Atlantic Ocean, with a few species known from the eastern Pacific Ocean. This genus is considered to be one of the most important fish groups of the coral reefs of Brazil due to its commercial value and crucial ecological role.

== Species ==
The 23 or so species in this genus include:

- Haemulon album G. Cuvier, 1830 (white margate)
- Haemulon atlanticus Carvalho, Marceniuk, Oliveira & Wosiacki, 2020 (Atlantic latin grunt)
- Haemulon aurolineatum G. Cuvier, 1830 (tomtate grunt)
- Haemulon bonariense G. Cuvier, 1830 (black grunt)
- Haemulon boschmae (Metzelaar, 1919) (bronzestripe grunt)
- Haemulon carbonarium Poey, 1860 (caesar grunt)
- Haemulon chrysargyreum Günther, 1859 (smallmouth grunt)
- Haemulon flaviguttatum T. N. Gill, 1862 (yellowspotted grunt)
- Haemulon flavolineatum (Desmarest, 1823) (French grunt)
- Haemulon macrostomum Günther, 1859 (Spanish grunt)
- Haemulon maculicauda (T. N. Gill, 1862) (spottail grunt)
- Haemulon melanurum (Linnaeus, 1758) (cottonwick grunt)
- Haemulon parra (Desmarest, 1823) (sailor's grunt)
- Haemulon plumierii (Lacépède, 1801) (white grunt)
- Haemulon schrankii Agassiz, 1831
- Haemulon sciurus (G. Shaw, 1803) (bluestriped grunt)
- Haemulon scudderii T. N. Gill, 1862 (grey grunt)
- Haemulon serrula G. Cuvier, 1830
- Haemulon sexfasciatum T. N. Gill, 1862 (greybar grunt)
- Haemulon squamipinna L. A. Rocha & I. M. L. Rosa, 1999
- Haemulon steindachneri (D. S. Jordan & C. H. Gilbert, 1882) (chere-chere grunt)
- Haemulon striatum (Linnaeus, 1758) (striped grunt)
- Haemulon vittatum (Poey, 1860) (boga)

== Description ==
Fish of this genus are oblong in shape and have large mouths. They have scales over the rays of their second dorsal and anal fins, and the second anal spine is larger than the third. The inside of the mouth is usually bright red. Juveniles of the genus look similar to each other, but the variation in the appearance of the adults is great.

== Diet ==
Some Haemulon species eat plankton in the open water, but most seek small prey on the seabed. Fish of the grunt family are nocturnal feeders, venturing in schools from the cover of the reefs around sunset to find food. The schools disperse as individuals go hunting, and then reform as morning approaches and they prepare to return to the reef.

== Behaviour ==
Haemulon species are common members of shallow reef fish communities in their range. Their schools can have hundreds or thousands of fish, including adults and juveniles. Schools can be made up of several different Haemulon species; for example, H. squamipinna and H. aurolineatum may associate with each other. Haemulon spp. have also been observed in schools with grunts of other genera, such as Anisotremus virginicus, and fish of different families, such as the snapper Lutjanus alexandrei, the goatfish Pseudupeneus maculatus, and the jack Carangoides bartholomaei. Other fish tend to join large Haemulon schools for protection. Sometimes they join a school simply for the protection offered by a large mass of fish, but some species engage in protective mimicry in a school. Unrelated fish that resemble Haemulon in color, size, and shape join the school to hide from predators, even mimicking the swimming style, movements, and postures of the Haemulon. Fish that do this include the goatfish Mulloidichthys martinicus, the parrotfish Sparisoma axillare, and the herring Harengula clupeola. M. martinicus, in particular, stays with groups of its own species while sheltering in the reefs, but when it enters the open water column and becomes visible to predators, it tends to join schools of Haemulon chrysargyreum, which it closely resembles. It assumes the posture of the grunts and blends into the group.

Despite their general preference for close association with other fish, some Haemulon spp. can be territorial and display aggressive behaviors. Larger individuals are more likely to act aggressively, and this behavior is more common at certain times of the day, such as early morning.

Like other members of their family, these fish produce a grunting sound by grinding their pharyngeal teeth, the behavior which inspired their common name.

The spawning behavior of these fish has not been observed.

== Systematics ==
Haemulon is split by some authorities into two genera, these workers suggest that Haemulon sensu lato is polyphyletic because molecular studies showed that H. chrysargyreum clustered with Xenistius californiensis, rendering Haemulon as polyphyletic if Xenistius was not included. The genus Brachygenys Poey, 1868 was revived to include Xenistius californiensis, Haemulon chrysargyreum, Xenistius peruanus and Xenocys jessiae.

== See also ==
- Haemulon vittata
