= Allen brothers milling company =

Flour mill in South Carolina, United States

Allen Brothers Milling Company
- Predecessor: B.R. Crooner & Columbia Grain & Provision Company
- Founded: 1900 in Columbia, South Carolina
- Founder: B.R. Crooner
- Products: flour, cornmeal, grits
- Website: https://adluh-store.myshopify.com/

The Allen Brothers Milling Company is a mill located at 804 Gervais St. in Columbia, South Carolina and is most famous for Adluh brand flour. It is the third (one source says second) oldest continually operating, electrically powered soft wheat mill in the United States. It is the last mill still operating in South Carolina.

Founded in 1900 by B.R. Crooner and family and later merging with the Columbia Grain & Provision Company owned by J.H. Hardin. Put into foreclosure by the First Commercial National Bank, the Allen family from Wadesboro, North Carolina purchased the mill in 1926 and continued operations. Of the 42 mills operating in South Carolina during World War II, only Greenwood Roller Mills and the Allen Brothers Milling Company remained by 2003. Adluh products exclusively South Carolina wheat and yellow corn, as well as Tennessee white corn. The mill uses stones in the grinding process in its original roll stands, producing between 50,000 and 60,000 pounds of flour, 25,000 pounds of cornmeal, and 6,000 pounds of grits per day. While no definite source for the name Adluh exists, supposedly it was named after Crooner's daughter Hulda (or Pierre Mazyck's daughter, depending on the source). Allen Brothers products carry the Certified SC Grown label and Adluh flour is South Carolina's official state flour.

Products produced by the mill include:

- Stone ground white grits
- Stone ground yellow grits
- Flour
- Cornmeal
- Biscuit mix
- Sweet potato mix
- Cobbler mix
- Cornbread mix
- Chicken breading
- Seafood breading
- Hushpuppy mix
- Pancake Mix
