= Janet Gibson =

Belizean biologist

- Occupations: Biologist and zoologist
- Organization: Belize Wildlife Conservation Society
- Awards: Goldman Environmental Prize (1990)

Janet Patricia Gibson is a biologist and zoologist from Belize. She was awarded the Goldman Environmental Prize in 1990 for her efforts on conservation of the marine ecosystems along the Belizean coast, in particular the barrier reef system. The Belize Barrier Reef was granted UNESCO World Heritage status in 1996, through efforts of Gibson and others. She is the current director of the Belize Wildlife Conservation Society.

== Biography ==
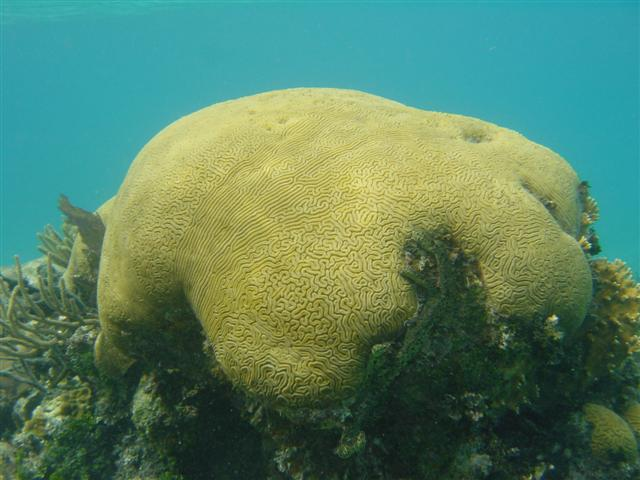
Hol Chan Marine Reserve

Janet Gibson was born in Belize and educated in the United States as a biologist and zoologist. In the mid-1980s she began working as a volunteer for the Belize Audubon Society. Between 1985 and 1987, she worked to establish the Hol Chan Marine Reserve, campaigning with citizens, businesses, fishermen, and the government of Belize for a protected reserve and educating them on the need for the project. She developed a management plan, worked to secure financing and drove the project forward. Her efforts were successful and the official sanctuary was established in 1987 and was the first reserve of its kind in Central America. The reserve covers around three square miles and is a protected zone, allowing fish which had previously been depleted to regenerate and providing a variety of fish for divers to encounter. In 1990 she was awarded the Goldman Environmental Prize for her efforts of conservation of the barrier reef system.

In 1988, she prepared the Glover's Reef Atoll Draft Management Plan and began efforts to secure reserve status for Glover's Reef as well. In 1990, she helped establish a Coastal Zone Management Unit as part of the Fisheries department. Gibson joined the Wildlife Conservation Society (WCS) and in 1993, their efforts, along with other organizations' support gained a designation as a protected reserve for Belize. Gibson and others working in environmental protection began to realize that individual protection was insufficient as without a management approach that protected the entire barrier zone, external forces, like algae blooms spawned from fruit plantation waste, overfishing in other areas causing collateral damage, or sedimentation caused by development, were having detrimental impacts. Working with water management agencies, forestry representatives, other environmental groups and citizens, in 1993 a plan was adopted to formalize protection of the reef as a natural World Heritage Site in a serial nomination. After several years of planning and work, the designation was granted by UNESCO in November 1996.

Gibson is the director of the Belize Wildlife Conservation Society and has published numerous scientific works.

== Selected works ==
- Gibson, Janet (1986). The coral reef. Belize: Reef Preservation Fund. OCLC 713021823.
- Gibson, J. P.; Price, Andrew; Young, E. R.; World Conservation Monitoring Centre (1993). Guidelines for Developing a Coastal Zone Management Plan for Belize: The GIS Database. IUCN. ISBN 978-2-8317-0156-1.
- Gibson, Janet; McField, Melanie D.; Wells, Sue (1998). "Coral reef management in Belize: an approach through Integrated Coastal Zone Management". Ocean & Coastal Management. 39 (3). ElSevier Science Ltd.: 229–244. doi:10.1016/s0964-5691(98)00007-6.
- Gibson, Janet; Lizama, Dominique; Pomeroy, Robert (2005). "Establishing a Socioeconomic Monitoring Program for Glover's Reef Atoll, Belize". Belize City, Belize: Wildlife Conservation Society.
- Gibson, Janet; et al. (2006). "A Simple, Cost-Effective Method for Involving Stakeholders in Spatial Assessments of Threats to Biodiversity". Human Dimensions of Wildlife. 11. Routledge Taylor & Francis Group: 43–54. doi:10.1080/10871200500470993. S2CID 145511983.
- Gibson, Janet P.; et al. (2012). "Fishing down a Caribbean food web relaxes trophic cascades". Marine Ecology Progress Series. 445. University of Exeter, Exeter, UK: Marine Spatial Ecology Lab: 13–24. Bibcode:2012MEPS..445...13M. doi:10.3354/meps09450. hdl:1834/36173.
- Babcock, Elizabeth A.; Coleman, Robin; Karnauskas, Mandy; Gibson, Janet (2013). "Length–based indicators of fishery and ecosystem status: Glover's Reef Marine Reserve, Belize". Fisheries Research. 147. ElSevier Science Ltd.: 434–445. doi:10.1016/j.fishres.2013.03.011.
- Groosman, Britt; Gibson, Janet (14 March 2014). "European Union Fisheries Ban Ignores Belize Conservation Success Story". National Geographic. Archived from the original on October 26, 2014.

== Sources ==
- Woodard, Colin (2001). Ocean's End: Travels Through Endangered Seas. Basic Books. ISBN 978-0-465-01571-9.
