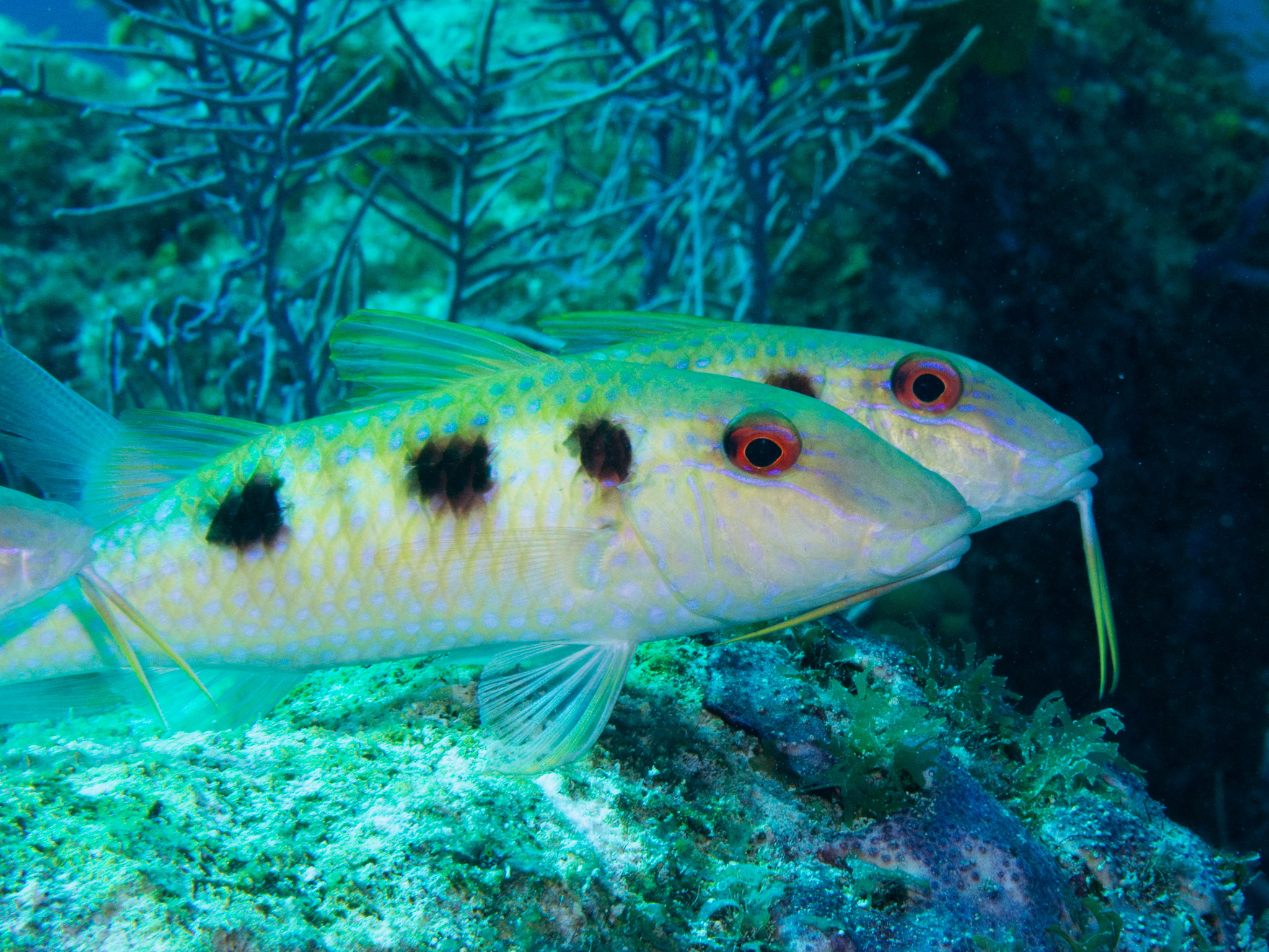
- Spotted goatfish (P. maculatus)

Scientific classification
- Kingdom: Animalia
- Phylum: Chordata
- Class: Actinopterygii
- Order: Syngnathiformes
- Family: Mullidae
- Genus: Pseudupeneus; Bleeker, 1862

Type species
- Upeneus prayensis Cuvier, 1829

Synonyms
- Brachymullus Bleeker, 1876; Mullhypeneus Poey, 1868

= Pseudupeneus =

Genus of ray-finned fishes

Pseudupeneus is a genus of goatfishes native to the Atlantic Ocean and the eastern Pacific Ocean. They inhabit mainly the coastal waters of continental shelves, but can be found in deep waters, as well.

== Species ==
There are currently three recognized species in this genus:

| Species | Common name | Image |
|---|---|---|
| Pseudupeneus grandisquamis (Gill, 1863) | Bigscale goatfish | |
| Pseudupeneus maculatus (Bloch, 1793) | Spotted goatfish | |
| Pseudupeneus prayensis (Cuvier, 1829) | West African goatfish | |
