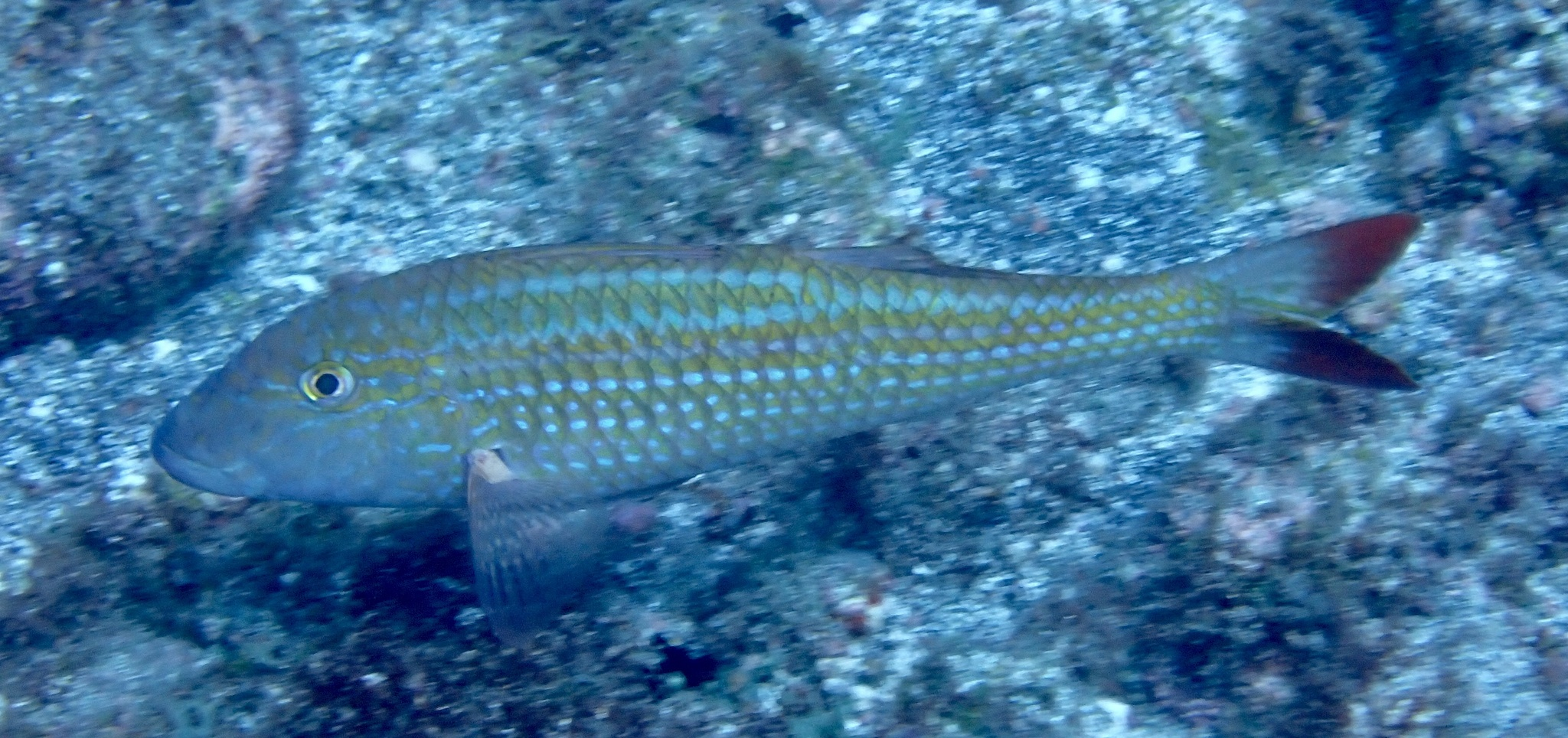

Conservation status
- Vulnerable (IUCN 3.1)

Scientific classification
- Kingdom: Animalia
- Phylum: Chordata
- Class: Actinopterygii
- Order: Syngnathiformes
- Family: Mullidae
- Genus: Pseudupeneus
- Species: P. prayensis

Binomial name
- Pseudupeneus prayensis (Cuvier, 1829)

Synonyms
- Upeneus prayensis Cuvier, 1829

= Pseudupeneus prayensis =

Species of fish

Pseudupeneus prayensis, the West African goatfish, is a species of goatfish, a marine ray-finned fish from the family Mullidae. This fish grows to 55 cm maximal length. The species name "prayensis" refers to the city Praia, the capital of Cape Verde, the species was described with a type locality of "Port Praya, Cape Verde Islands".

== Description ==
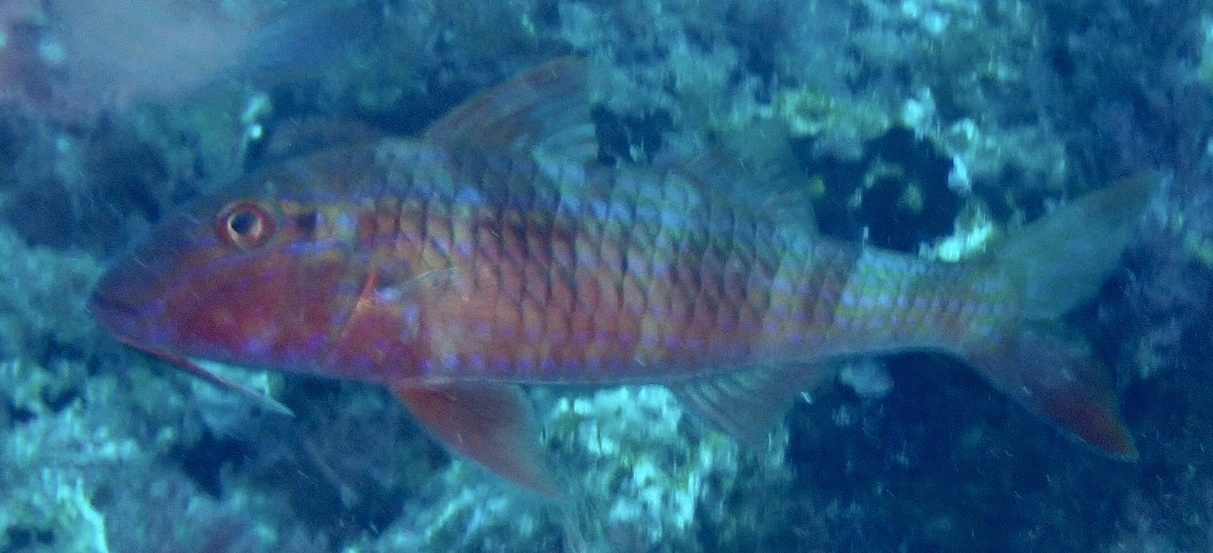
In Cape Verde

Pseudupenus prayensis has a moderately compressed body with a head profile which is not markedly convex. It has a single spine on the rear margin of the gill cover and a pair of thick barbels below its chin. Both jaws are equipped with strong, conical teeth with a few of the outer teeth in the upper jaw being backward pointing and these are obvious when the mouth is closed. There are no teeth on vomer and palatines. There are 8 spines in the first dorsal fin with the first spine being very short, the second dorsal fin has a single spine and eight soft rays. The body is covered in large scales with a count of 28–29 in the lateral line. It is normally a rosy colour marked with three or four horizontal red lines along its body. The largest fishes may have a standard length of 55 centimetres (22 in) but they are more normally 30–35 cm (12–14 in).

== Distribution ==
Pseudupenus prayensis occurs in the eastern Atlantic Ocean, off the coast of Africa between southern Morocco and Angola, including the Cape Verde Islands. It is a major targeted commercial species off West Africa and has been recorded on rare, distinct occasions in the Mediterranean Sea since 1987.

== Habitat and biology ==
Pseudupenus prayensis occurs mostly over muddy or sandy sea beds where it feeds on benthic invertebrates. It may also be found over rocky reefs to depths of 300 metres (980 ft). It is common in estuaries.

== Usage ==
Pseudupeneus prayensis is an important species for commercial fisheries along the West African coast. They are mainly taken using trawls, although they are also taken using trammel nets and entangling nets. This species is among the most quarry species for coastal demersal fisheries in Ghana while in Senegal it is an important demersal resource and is caught by both industrial and artisanal fishing fleets.
