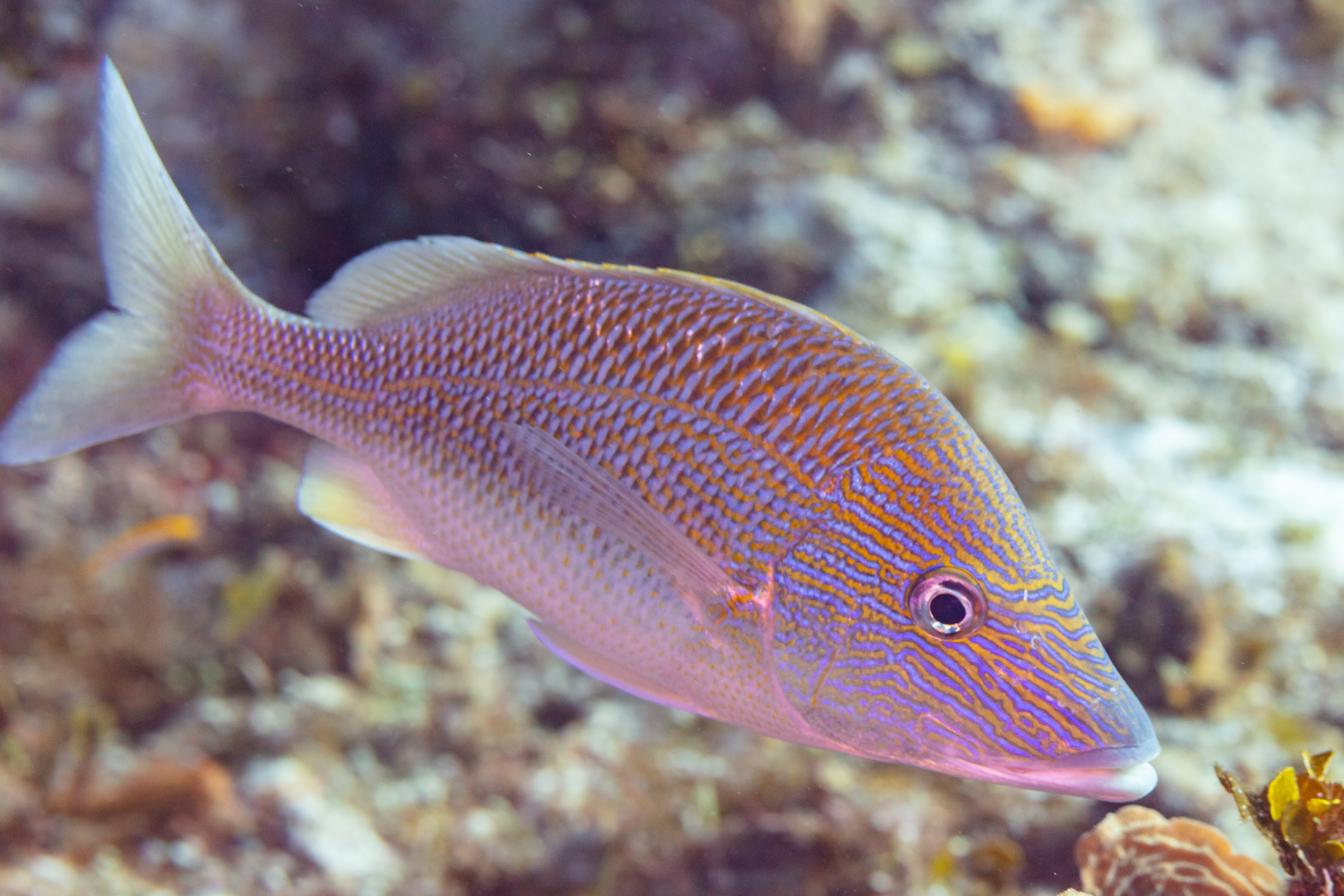
- In Cozumel, Mexico

Conservation status
- Least Concern (IUCN 3.1)

Scientific classification
- Kingdom: Animalia
- Phylum: Chordata
- Class: Actinopterygii
- Order: Acanthuriformes
- Family: Haemulidae
- Genus: Haemulon
- Species: H. plumierii

Binomial name
- Haemulon plumierii (Lacépède, 1801)

Synonyms
- Labrus plumierii Lacépède, 1801

= Haemulon plumierii =

Species of fish

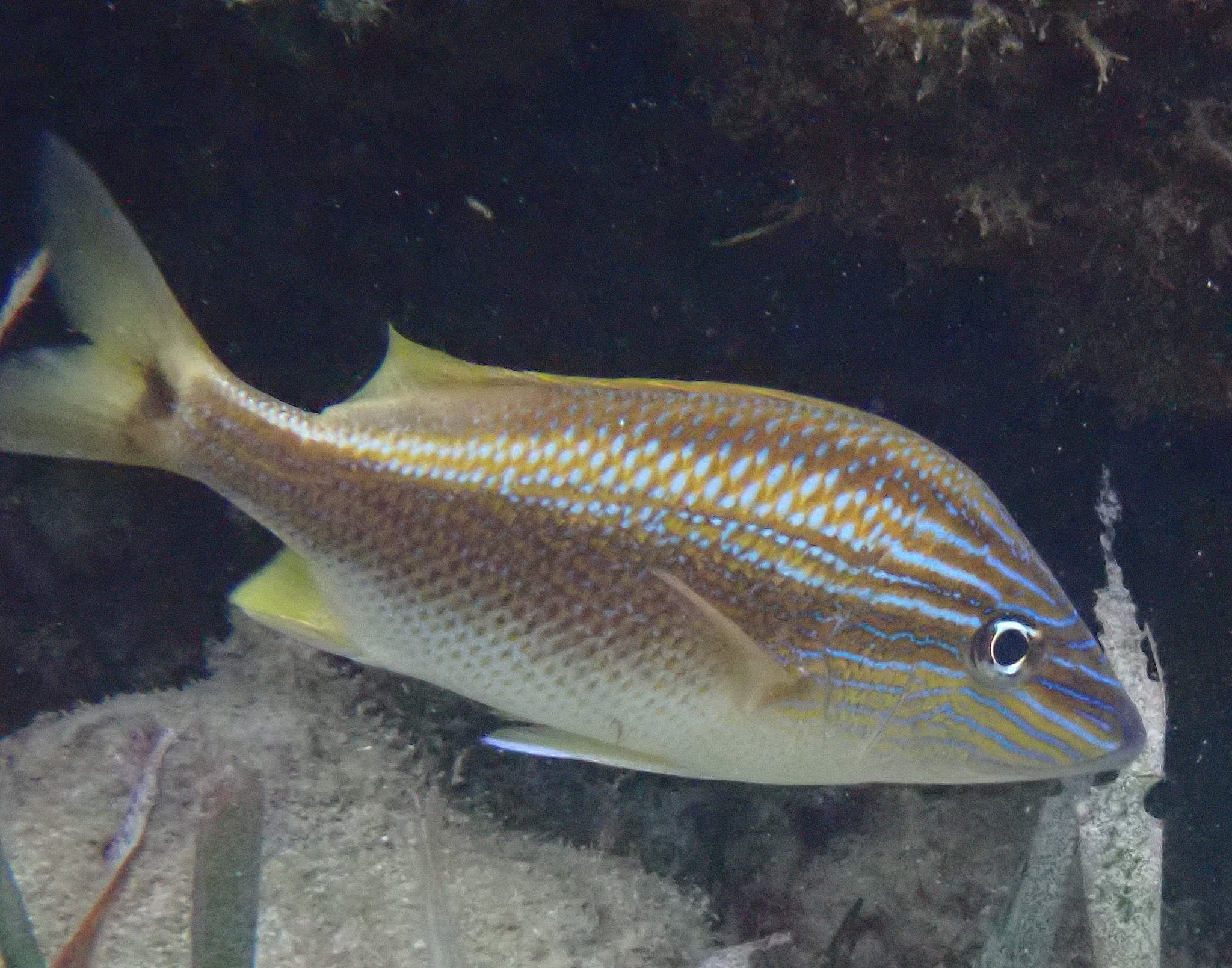
In Mexico

Haemulon plumierii, the white grunt or common grunt, is a species of ray-finned fish in the family Haemulidae native to the western Atlantic Ocean. It grows to a length of about 30 cm (12 in) and is a silvery-cream color, with narrow yellow and blue longitudinal stripes, but can modify its color somewhat to match its surroundings. It is closely related to the bluestriped grunt and the French grunt, and often schools with these species. It feeds on shrimp, other crustaceans, annelids, and mollusks, and is preyed on by larger piscivores such as barracuda and shark. It is sometimes caught by anglers as a game fish, and its flaky white flesh can be eaten. It is also a popular aquarium fish.

== Habitat and distribution ==
The white grunt is found near mangroves, reefs, docks, and nearly any sort of structure in its range, which extends in the Western Atlantic from Chesapeake Bay through the Caribbean and Gulf of Mexico south to Brazil. It normally lives in depths similar to that of its relative, the bluestriped grunt, from 0 to 30 m in depth.

This fish is closely related to the bluestriped grunt (H. sciurus) and the French grunt (H. flavolineatum). The white grunt is often seen schooling with those species. The familiar "grunt" that this fish makes is caused by its pharyngeal teeth grinding in the back of its throat. This sound is normally made when the fish is distressed or in danger, such as when being caught by an angler.

== Description ==
The white grunt is a silvery cream color with numerous yellow and blue horizontal stripes present across the body. Its head is long with a distinct snout, and falcate pectoral fins and a forked caudal tail are also present. H. plumieri also has numerous dorsal spines and rough teeth. Unlike groupers or snappers, grunts have a strong fixed lower jawbone. The average size of this fish is 6 to 12 inches, and H. plumieri often changes its color to its direct surroundings, becoming accordingly paler or darker. The white grunt has been observed to reach lengths over 20 inches and weights above 15 lb.

== Diet ==
Although the natural diet of this fish largely consists of shrimp, they also feed upon annelids, crustaceans, and bivalves. Largely opportunistic, anglers have caught them on the whole spectrum of natural and artificial baits.

== Predators ==
Large species of predatory fish such as barracuda and shark feed upon white grunts, as they are abundant and school in fairly large numbers. Other piscivorous fish such as groupers and snappers also eat H. plumieri.

== Systematics ==
H. plumierii was first formally described in 1801 as Labrus plumierii by French naturalist Bernard German de Lacépède (1756-1825), with the type locality given as Martinique. The specific name honours the Franciscan friar and naturalist Charles Plumier (1664–1704), Lacépède based his description of this species on a drawing by Plumier.

== Human uses ==
The white grunt has minor importance on the commercial scale, but is somewhat popular with children and beginners as game fish, and even experienced fishermen. Grunts are easy to catch and have white meat that cooks well, so they are sometimes caught to be eaten. A historic Florida dish, "grits and grunts", is traditionally prepared with H. plumieri. They also have bait value for large piscivorous fish. These fish also have high value as aquarium fish, due to their bright colors.
