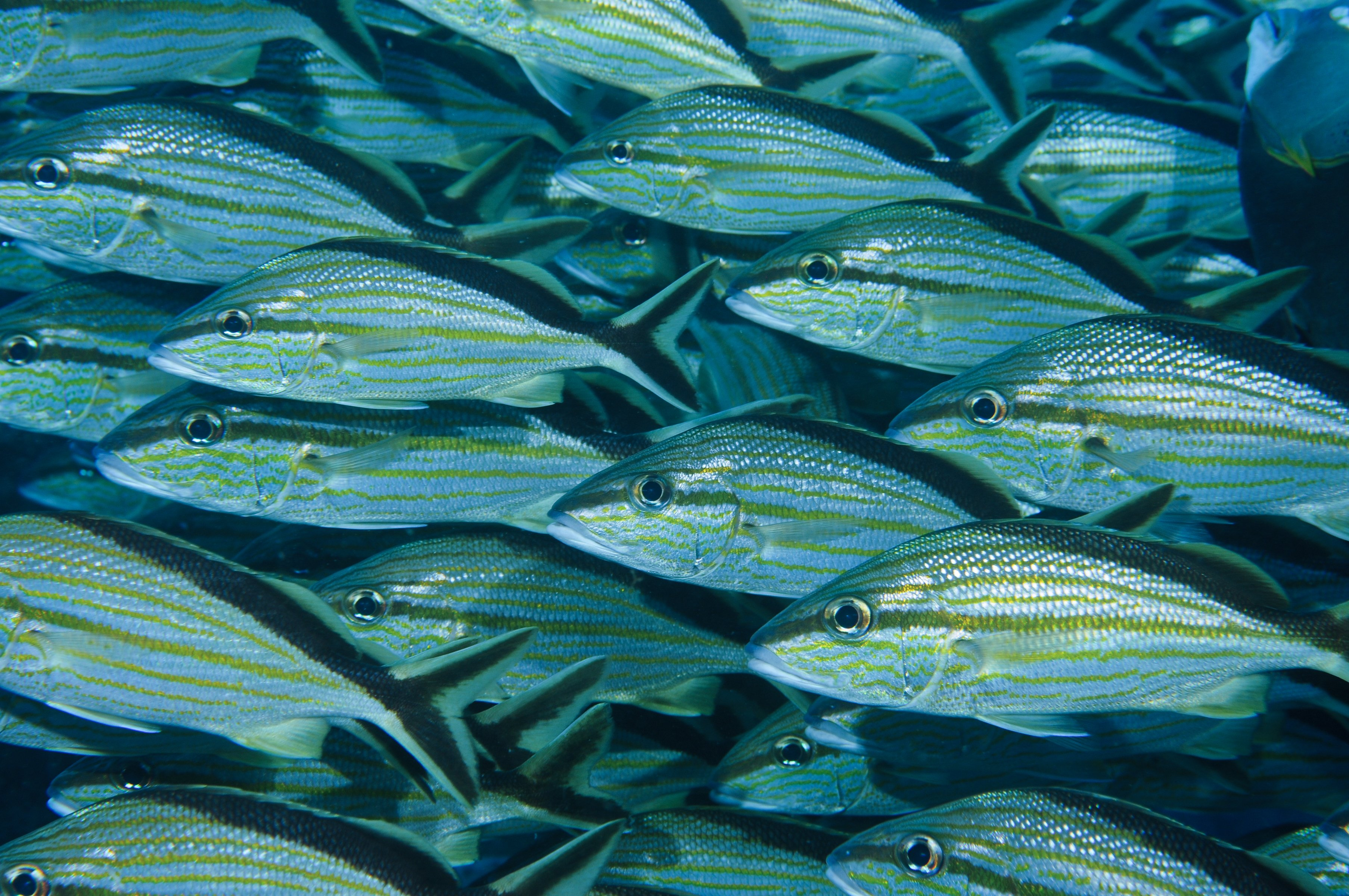

Conservation status
- Least Concern (IUCN 3.1)

Scientific classification
- Kingdom: Animalia
- Phylum: Chordata
- Class: Actinopterygii
- Division: Teleostei
- Order: Acanthuriformes
- Family: Haemulidae
- Genus: Haemulon
- Species: H. melanurum

Binomial name
- Haemulon melanurum (Linnaeus, 1758)

Synonyms
- Haemulon melanura (Linnaeus, 1758); Perca melanura Linnaeus, 1758

= Haemulon melanurum =

Species of ray-finned fish within the family Haemulidae

Haemulon melanurum, the cottonwick grunt, is a species of ray-finned fish within the family Haemulidae. The species is found inhabiting tropical waters in the western Atlantic near parts of North and South America. The species can grow to a maximum length of 43.5 centimetres (17.1 in), however individuals are most commonly found at lengths of 25 centimetres (9.8 in). The maximum published weight of the species was 550 grams (19 oz). Adults are silver in coloration with narrow yellow stripes running along the body, with a bronze line in front of the eye. Adults also possess a black line running from the beginning of the dorsal fins to the caudal fins. It is an oviparous schooling fish that feeds on crustaceans.

== Distribution & habitat ==
The cottonwick grunt is found distributed in much of the Caribbean and other nearby areas, spanning from northern Brazil to southeastern Florida and Veracruz, as well as southeastern Texas and Bermuda. Habitats include clear waters up to 50 metres (160 ft) deep, often alongside reefs and adjacent seagrass beds. It may also be found alongside shipwrecks that act as artificial reefs.

== Conservation ==
The cottonwick grunt is currently assessed as 'Least concern' by the IUCN Red List. Adults are often abundant in some areas. The species currently has minor commercial importance to fisheries and the aquarium trade. It can potentially be impacted by localised overfishing and invasive lionfish that may eat small growing individuals. However, there is little evidence to suggest global scale declines from these threats.
