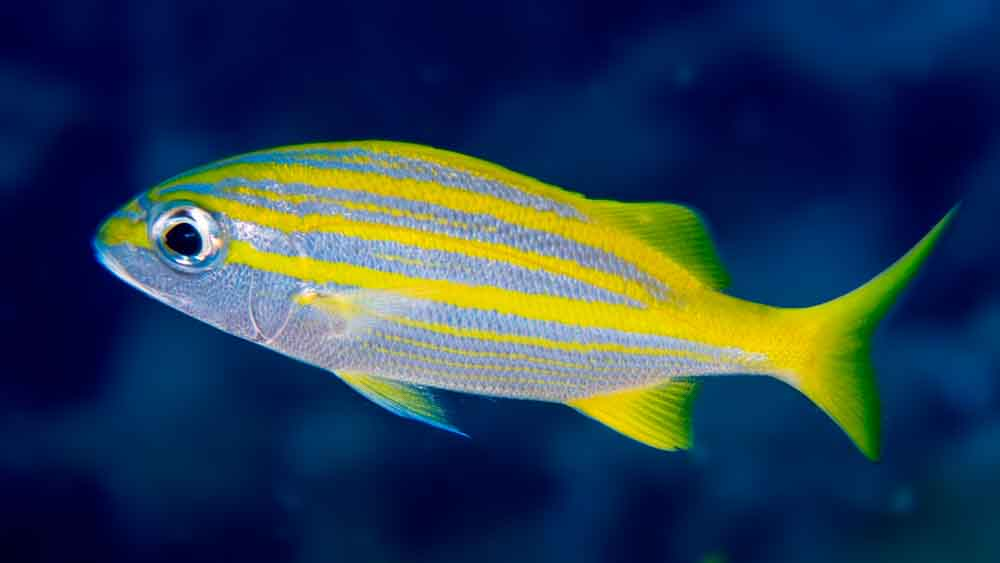

Scientific classification
- Kingdom: Animalia
- Phylum: Chordata
- Class: Actinopterygii
- Order: Acanthuriformes
- Family: Haemulidae
- Genus: Haemulon
- Species: H. squamipinna

Binomial name
- Haemulon squamipinna Rocha & Rosa, 1999

= Haemulon squamipinna =

Species of fish

Haemulon squamipinna is a species of marine ray-finned fish, a grunt belonging to the family Haemulidae. It is found in the western Atlantic Ocean where it is endemic to Brazil, here it is locally known as Xira Amarela, and occurs along the coast from the states of Ceará to Bahia. It grows to about 20 cm (7.9 in) in length, feeds at night on benthic invertebrates, and is important for subsistence fisheries along the northeastern Brazilian coast. It forms large schools that can number in the thousands, sometimes with Haemulon aurolineatum. Juveniles are often found in shallow reefs at depths of 2 to 5 m (6 ft 7 in to 16 ft 5 in) while adults are found in deeper areas at 5 to 30 m (16 to 98 ft).

The name "squamipinna" is derived from the Latin, meaning "scaled fins", and is an allusion to the observation that the pectoral fins in this species are covered with scales, making it easy to distinguish it from other species in the genus.
