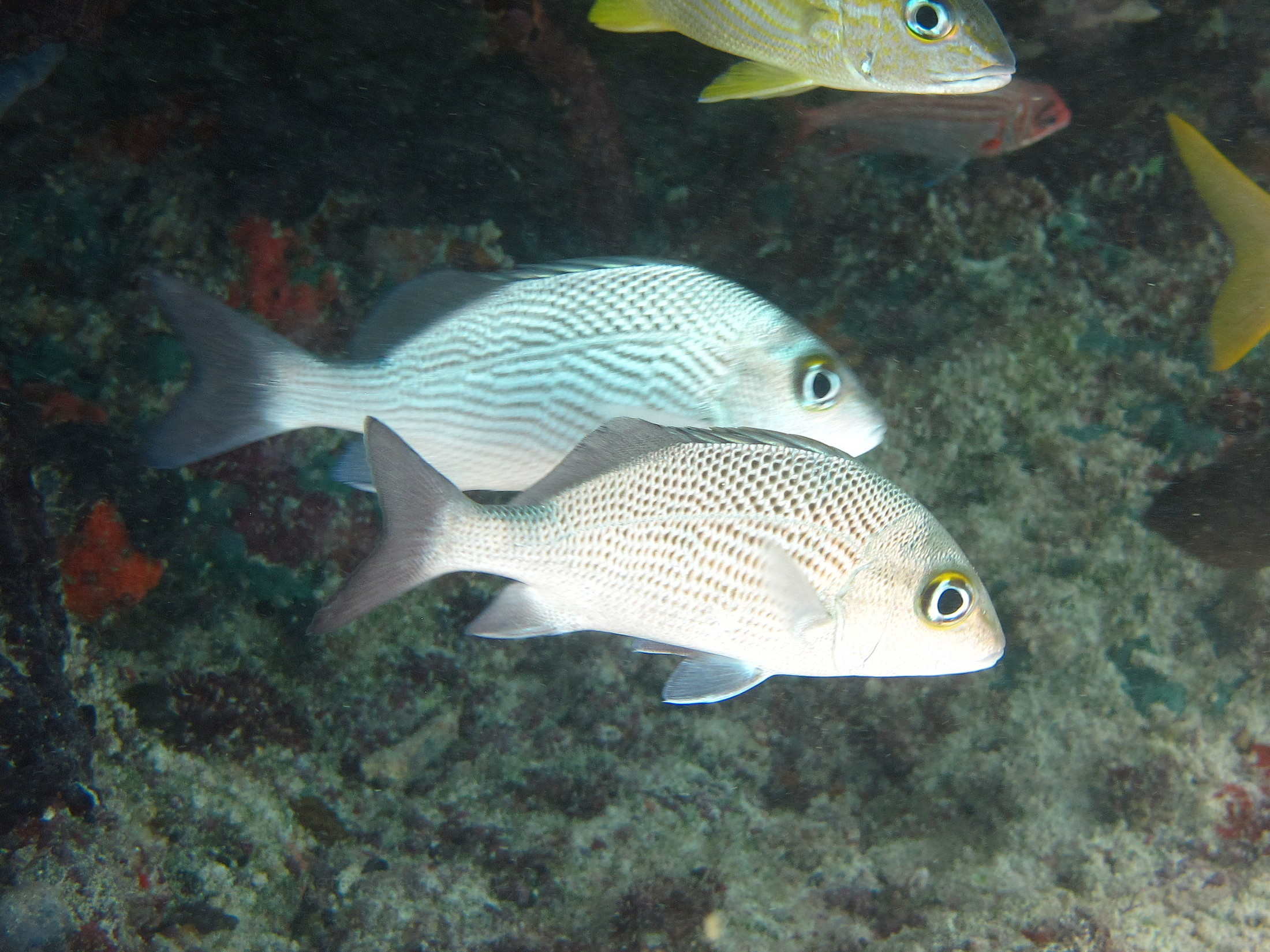
- Bayahíbe, Dominican Republic

Conservation status
- Least Concern (IUCN 3.1)

Scientific classification
- Domain: Eukaryota
- Kingdom: Animalia
- Phylum: Chordata
- Class: Actinopterygii
- Order: Acanthuriformes
- Family: Haemulidae
- Genus: Haemulon
- Species: H. parra

Binomial name
- Haemulon parra (Desmarest, 1823)

Synonyms
- Diabasis parra Desmarest, 1823; Haemulon parrai (Desmarest, 1823)

= Haemulon parra =

Sailor's grunt

Species of fish

Haemulon parra, also known by the common names sailor's grunt and sailor's choice, is a species of grunt native to the Atlantic Ocean.

== Taxonomy ==
Haemulon parra was described in 1823 by Anselme Gaëtan Desmarest. Its genus name comes from the Greek haimaleos, meaning "bloody." The specific epithet is a Latin word for "sparrow."

== Description ==
This species has a dull head with a medium-to-small-sized mouth. It does not have fleshy lips, and a part of the eye near the back is covered by scales. Its chin has two small openings and one furrow in the middle. The eye's edges are commonly either yellow or bronze. In color, adults are a mixture of silver and grey covered with dotted black stripes running laterally. Juveniles have four black stripes over white and a spot on their tail fin. The maximum length recorded is 41.2 cm (16.2 in).

== Distribution ==
Haemulon parra is found in the Western Atlantic Ocean, from Florida to Brazil, also entering the Gulf of Mexico.

== Behavior ==
The sailor's grunt prefers reefs and hard bottoms, and resides in depths from 0–80 m (0–262 ft). Juveniles are more attracted to seagrass beds. Adults are known to school and can be seen in more open areas.

It feeds at night, eating mollusks and fish.

== Human use ==
It is sometimes fished commercially, although the market is minor. H. parra can be also found in aquariums.

== Conservation ==
Haemulon parra was evaluated by the International Union for Conservation of Nature in March 2011, which placed it as Least Concern on the IUCN Red List.
