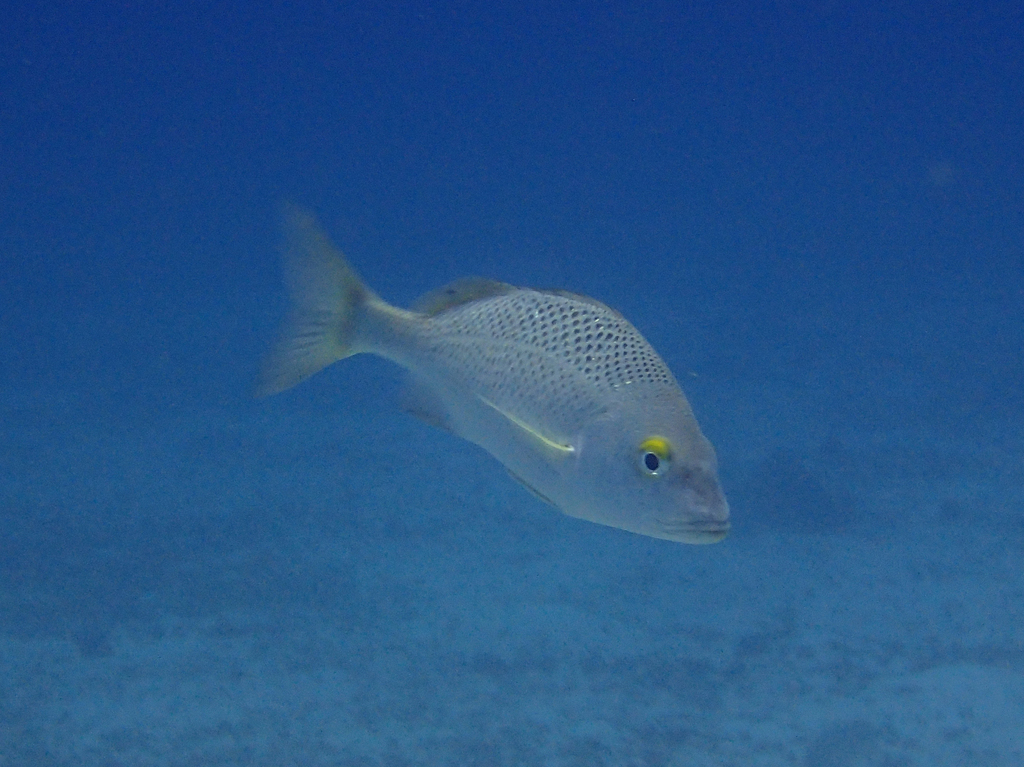
- Isla Santa Cruz, Galápagos

Conservation status
- Least Concern (IUCN 3.1)

Scientific classification
- Kingdom: Animalia
- Phylum: Chordata
- Class: Actinopterygii
- Order: Acanthuriformes
- Family: Haemulidae
- Genus: Haemulon
- Species: H. scudderii

Binomial name
- Haemulon scudderii Gill, 1862

= Haemulon scudderii =

Species of fish

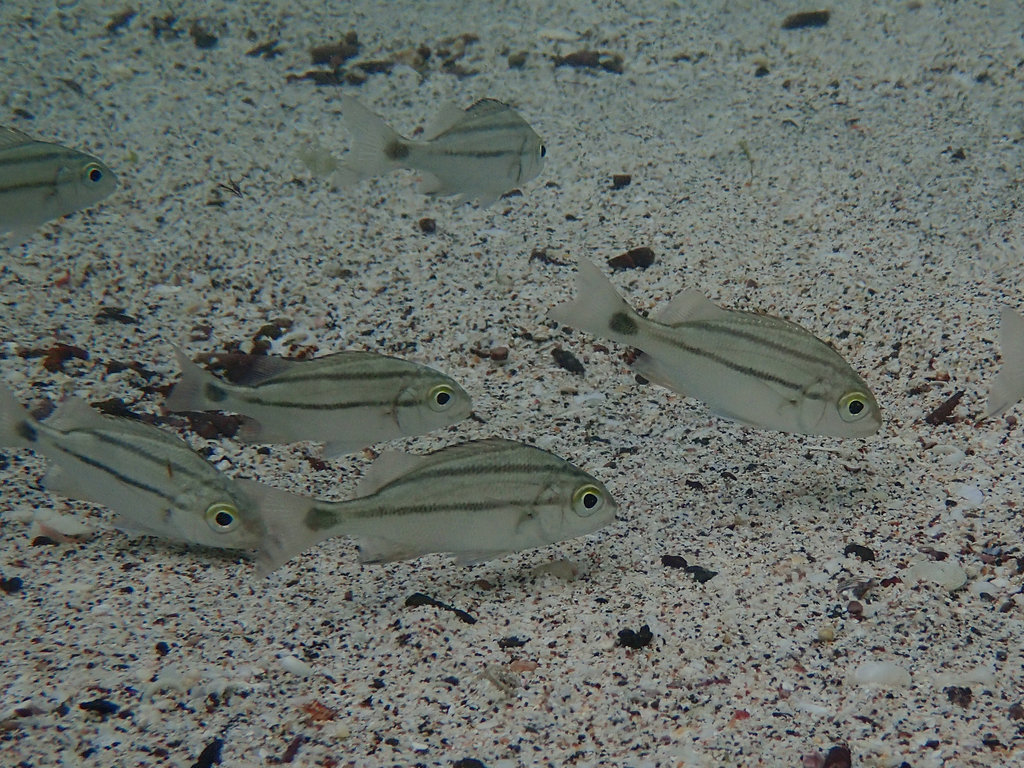
Juveniles

Haemulon scudderii, the grey grunt, golden-eye grunt, or mojarra grunt, is a species of marine ray-finned fish, a grunt belonging to the family Haemulidae. It is found in the eastern Pacific Ocean.

== Description ==
H. scudderii has an oblong, compressed body with an oblique mouth, which has a projecting lower jaw, the lips are not fleshy and open below the centre of the eye. It has a continuous dorsal fin, which has a small to medium-sized notch in its middle. The dorsal fin contains 11-12 spines and 14*17 soft rays while the anal fin has 3 spines and 7-8 soft rays. The overall colour is silvery-grey, with each of the scales having a black spot on it, with notably golden eyes. The inside of the mouth is normally orange in colour. The median fins are black while the pectoral and pelvic fins are a slightly lighter dusky colour. The juveniles have a dark midlateral stripe that joins a black spot at the base of the caudal fin and a second stripe from the upper part of eye to upper surface of the caudal peduncle. This species attains a maximum total length of 35 cm (14 in), although a length of 30 cm (12 in) is more typical.

== Distribution ==
H. scudderii is endemic to the eastern Pacific Ocean. It is distributed from southern Baja California and the central Gulf of California south along the coasts of Central America and South America as far south as Ecuador, its range includes the Galapagos Islands.

== Habitat and biology ==
H. scudderii is found at depths between 1 and 30 m (3 ft 3 in and 98 ft 5 in), where it forms shoals around rock reefs in inshore waters wit some tidal movement. This species is a nocturnal carnivore, preying on benthic invertebrates such as crustaceans, echinoderms, and molluscs, as well as small fish. It is a poorly studied species and little is known about its biology, although it is oviparous and spawning is carried out in distinct pairs.

== Systematics ==
H. scudderii was first formally described in 1862 by American zoologist Theodore Gill (1837-1914), with the type locality given as Cabo San Lucas in Baja California. The specific name honours American entomologist and paleontologist Samuel Hubbard Scudder (1837-1911), who at the time Gill wrote his description was studying the genus Haemulon with Louis Agassiz.
