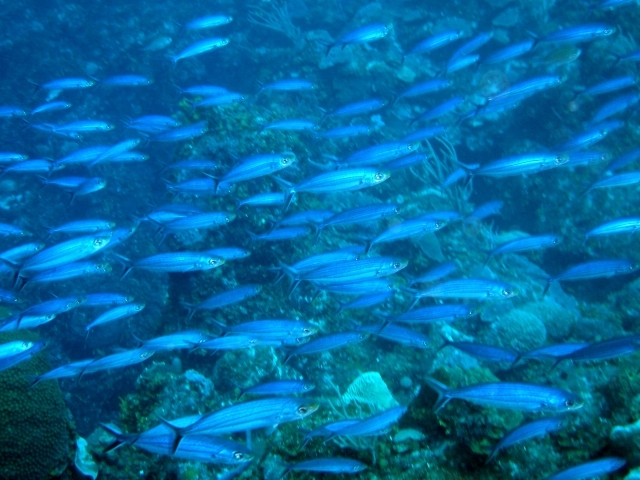
- A shoal of boga off the coast of Cuba.

Conservation status
- Least Concern (IUCN 3.1)

Scientific classification
- Kingdom: Animalia
- Phylum: Chordata
- Class: Actinopterygii
- Order: Acanthuriformes
- Family: Haemulidae
- Genus: Haemulon
- Species: H. vittatum

Binomial name
- Haemulon vittatum (Poey, 1860)

Synonyms
- Inermia vittata Poey, 1860; Haemulon vittata (Poey, 1860)

= Haemulon vittatum =

Species of fish

Haemulon vittatum, the boga, is an ocean-going species of grunt native to the western Atlantic Ocean. Bogas are also known as the snit in Jamaica, and bonnetmouth in the Bahamas. It was first described by Cuban zoologist Felipe Poey. This species used to be classified as Inermia vittata, but genetic data revealed that it belongs to the genus Haemulon.

== Description ==
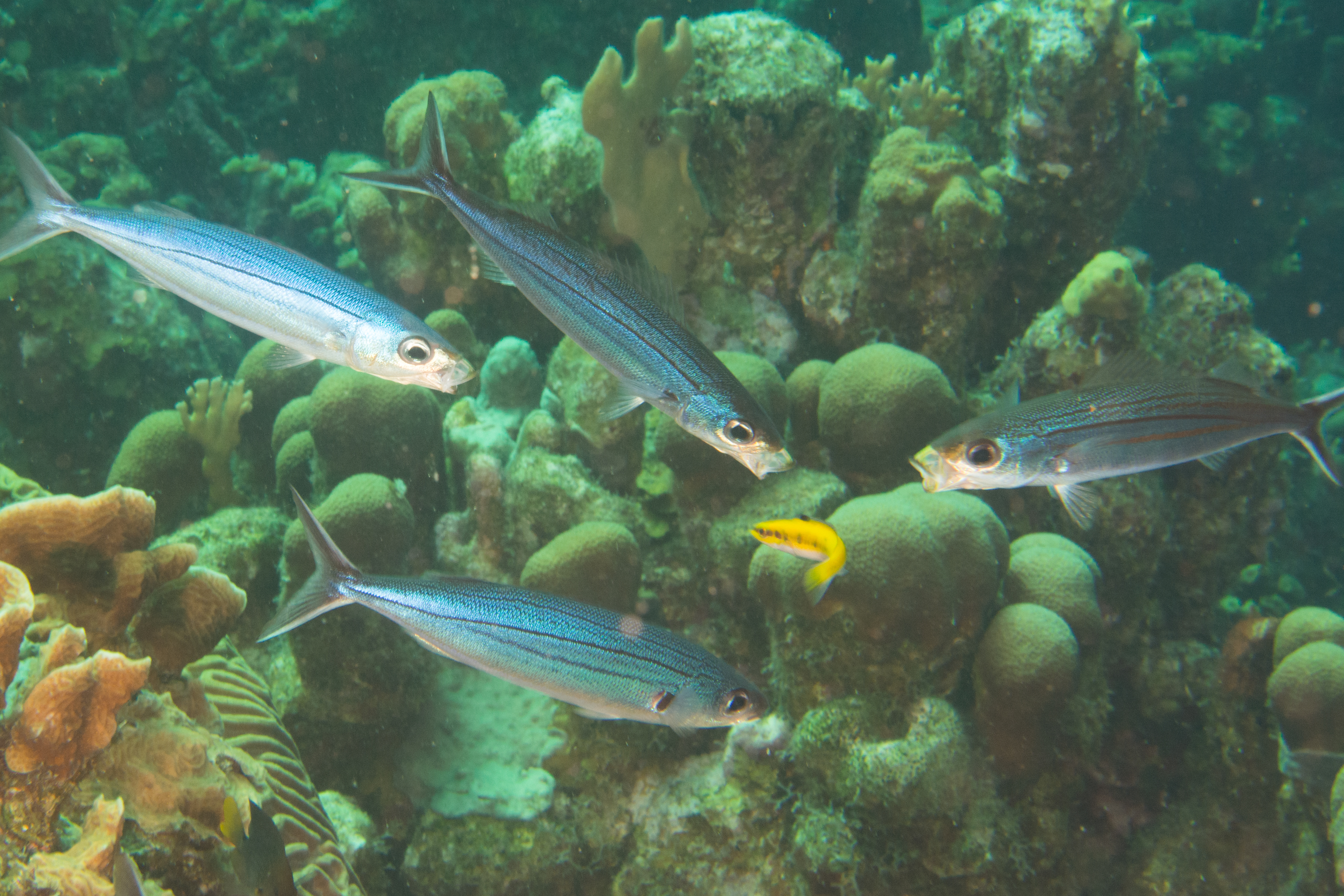
Boga at cleaning station. Note extended mouth.

Haemulon vittatum is a spindle-shaped fish. It has a deeply forked caudal fin, and its two dorsal fins are close together. It is also able to protrude its mouth much further than many fishes, hence the name bonnetmouth. They usually have 14-15 spines on their dorsal fins, but only 10 soft rays. They have two spines and 9 rays on their anal fins, as well. The longest recorded Boga was 23 cm in length The boga's life colors are generally greenish above, and blueish-white below. A greenish stripe, tinged with yellow, can be seen from the eye to the tail. Three similar stripes are on the back. The snout and dorsal fins are both yellowish or pale yellow, while the caudal fin is dusky violet. The pectoral fins are both rosy, and the anal and ventral fins are both white.

== Distribution and habitat ==
Haemulon vittatum is only known from the western Atlantic Ocean from Florida and the Bahamas south to northern South America, including the Antilles and the Caribbean.

Occurring in open water, Bogas are sometimes found near coasts or over reefs they can mainly be found off of oceanic islands, where they feed on zooplankton and smaller fishes. Bogas are occasionally sold fresh, and used as baitfish; they are known to be preyed upon by the red hind (Epinephelus guttatus), a member of the grouper family.

== Systematics ==
Haemolon vittatum was first formally described as Inermia vittata in 1860 by the Cuban zoologist Felipe Poey (1799-1891) with the type locality given as Havana. The specific name vittatum means "banded", which is assumed to refer to the wide greenish stripe running from the eye to the base of caudal fin and the 3-4 brownish stripes above it.
