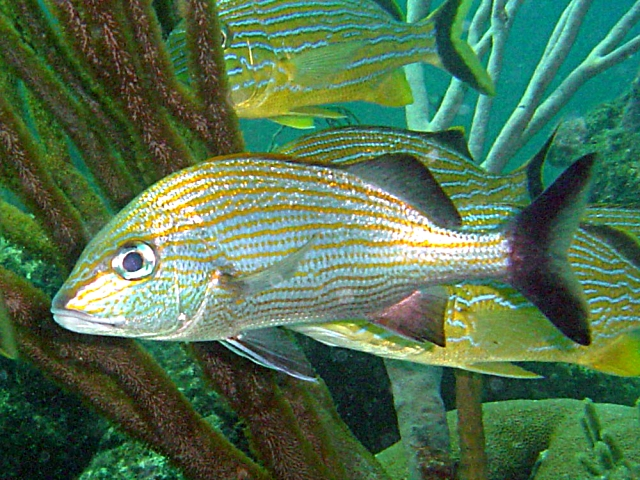

Conservation status
- Least Concern (IUCN 3.1)

Scientific classification
- Kingdom: Animalia
- Phylum: Chordata
- Class: Actinopterygii
- Order: Acanthuriformes
- Family: Haemulidae
- Genus: Haemulon
- Species: H. carbonarium

Binomial name
- Haemulon carbonarium Poey, 1860

= Caesar grunt =

Species of fish

The Caesar grunt (Haemulon carbonarium), also known as the black grunt, blacktail grunt, or redmouth grunt is a species of marine ray-finned fish, a grunt in the family Haemulidae. It is native to the western Atlantic Ocean.

== Description ==
The Caesar grunt has an oblong, compressed body with a deep, blunt-snouted head. The moderately sized mouth is horizontal and does not have very fleshy lips. It has a continuous dorsal fin, which has a slight notch at its centre. The base of soft-rayed part of the dorsal fin and of the anal fin are scaled. The dorsal fin contains 12 spines and 15-16 soft rays while the anal fin has tree spines and eight soft rays. The overall colour is silvery white broken by longitudinal orange-brown stripes, these are broader and more obvious above the lateral line. Also, they have a black spot at the base of their caudal fin, which is characteristic of this species. The anal, pectoral, and pelvic fins are transparent, while the caudal fin is dark. The dorsal fin is also transparent, but it has an orange-brown margin on the spiny part, while the soft-rayed part has a dark margin. The head is marked with bronze-yellow stripes and spots. The flesh on the inside of the mouth is orange. This species attains a maximum total length of 36 cm (14 in), although 20 cm (7.9 in) is more typical.

== Distribution ==
The Caesar grunt is found in the western Atlantic Ocean. It is distributed from Cape Canaveral in Florida and Bermuda in the north southwards through the Bahamas, to the Gulf of Mexico including the Florida Keys, the Florida Middle Grounds, along the mainland coast from Tuxpan in Mexico along the northern coast of the Yucatan Peninsula to northwestern Cuba, and throughout the Caribbean Sea. Claims from Brazil are likely to be misidentifications.

== Habitat and biology ==
The Caesar grunt is found at depths from 2 to 30 m (6 ft 7 in to 98 ft 5 in). This species is found in clear water on rocky or coral reefs and in mangroves. They are social Fish which form schools, feeding nocturnally on benthic invertebrates such as crabs, gastropods, starfish and polychaetes. Caesar grunts are oviparous, forming distinct pairs to spawn and have pelagic larvae.

== Systematics ==
The Caesar grunt was first formally described in 1860 by the Cuban zoologist Felipe Poey (1799–1891) with the type locality given as Havana. The specific name carbonarius means "coal-like", a reference to its Cuban Spanish vernacular name of Ronco carbonero, named for its dark fins.

== Uses ==
The Caesar grunt is targeted by commercial fisheries in some parts of its range, it is also caught for the aquarium trade. They are caught using traps, hook-and-line, and seines, but catch statistics are not collected. They are mainly sold fresh.
