= Grits =

Porridge of boiled cornmeal

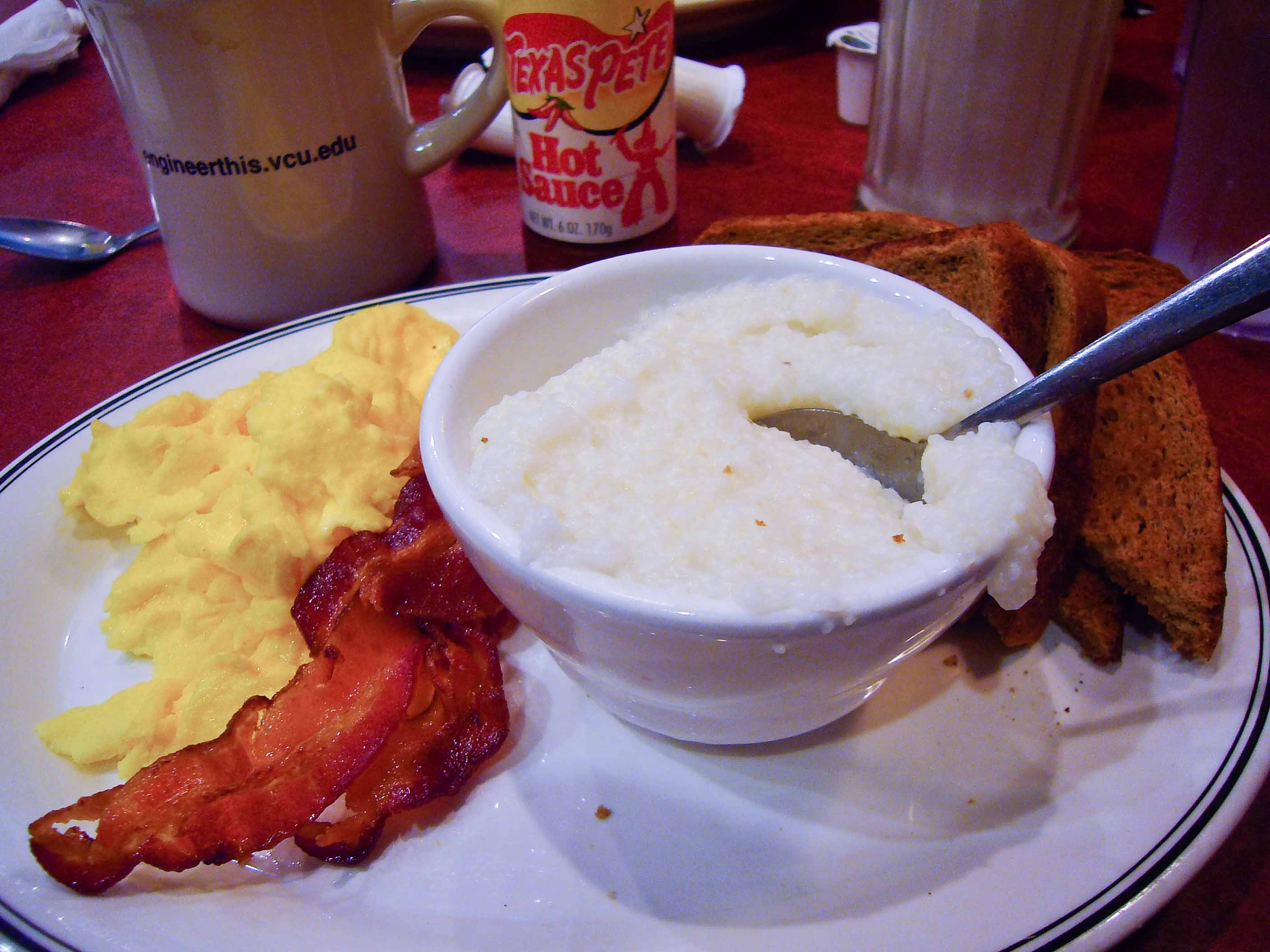
- Grits, as a breakfast side-dish with bacon, scrambled eggs and toast
- Type: Porridge
- Place of origin: United States
- Main ingredients: Ground corn
- Variations: Hominy grits; Yellow speckled grits; Cheese grits; Fried grits

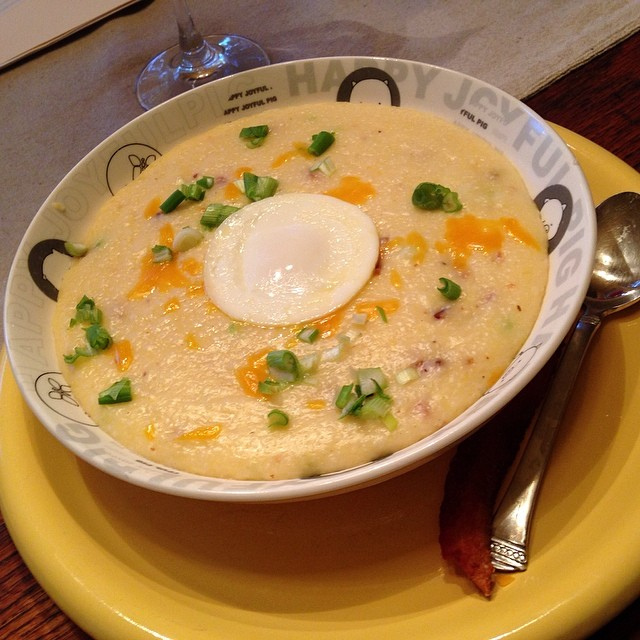
Grits with cheese, bacon, green onion and a basted egg

Grits is a type of porridge made from coarsely ground dried corn (maize) or hominy, the latter being maize that has been treated with an alkali in a process called nixtamalization, with the pericarp (ovary wall) removed. It is eaten primarily in the United States. Grits are cooked in warm salted water or milk. They are often served with flavorings as a breakfast dish, though it is also served as a lunch or supper dish, particularly with meat. Grits can be savory or sweet, with savory seasonings being more common. Grits are similar to other thick maize-based porridges from around the world, such as polenta, mieliepap, and mămăligă. Italian-Americans living in the delta of Arkansas and Mississippi recognized this and have substituted grits for traditional polenta dishes. The dish originated in the Southern United States but is now available nationwide. Grits are part of the dinner main dish shrimp and grits, served primarily in the Southern United States.

The word grits is derived from the Old English word grytt, meaning "coarse meal". In the Charleston, South Carolina area, cooked hominy grits were primarily referred to as "hominy" until the 1980s.

== Origin ==
The dish originated with the Native American Muscogee tribe using maize. European colonists learned to make the dish from the Native Americans, and it quickly became an American staple.

At that time, maize or hominy for grits was ground on a stone mill. The ground material was passed through screens, the finer sifted material used as grit meal, and the coarser as grits.

Three-quarters of the grits sold in the U.S. are bought in the South, in an area stretching from Lower Texas to Washington, D.C., which is sometimes called the "grits belt". The state of Georgia declared grits to be its official prepared food in 2002. A similar bill was introduced in South Carolina to name it the official state food, but it did not advance. Nevertheless, South Carolina still has an entire chapter of legislation dealing exclusively with corn meal and grits. State law in South Carolina requires grits and rice meal to be enriched, similar to the requirement for flour.

Traditionally, grits were either yellow or white, depending on the color of the maize used. In the 2010s, companies began re-introducing ancient colored corn grits. Natural colors include red, blue and purple. The most common version in supermarkets is "quick" grits, which are made from non-hominy maize and have the germ and hull removed. Whole kernel grits are sometimes called "speckled". Whole kernel grits are often marketed as "stone ground grits".

== Preparation ==
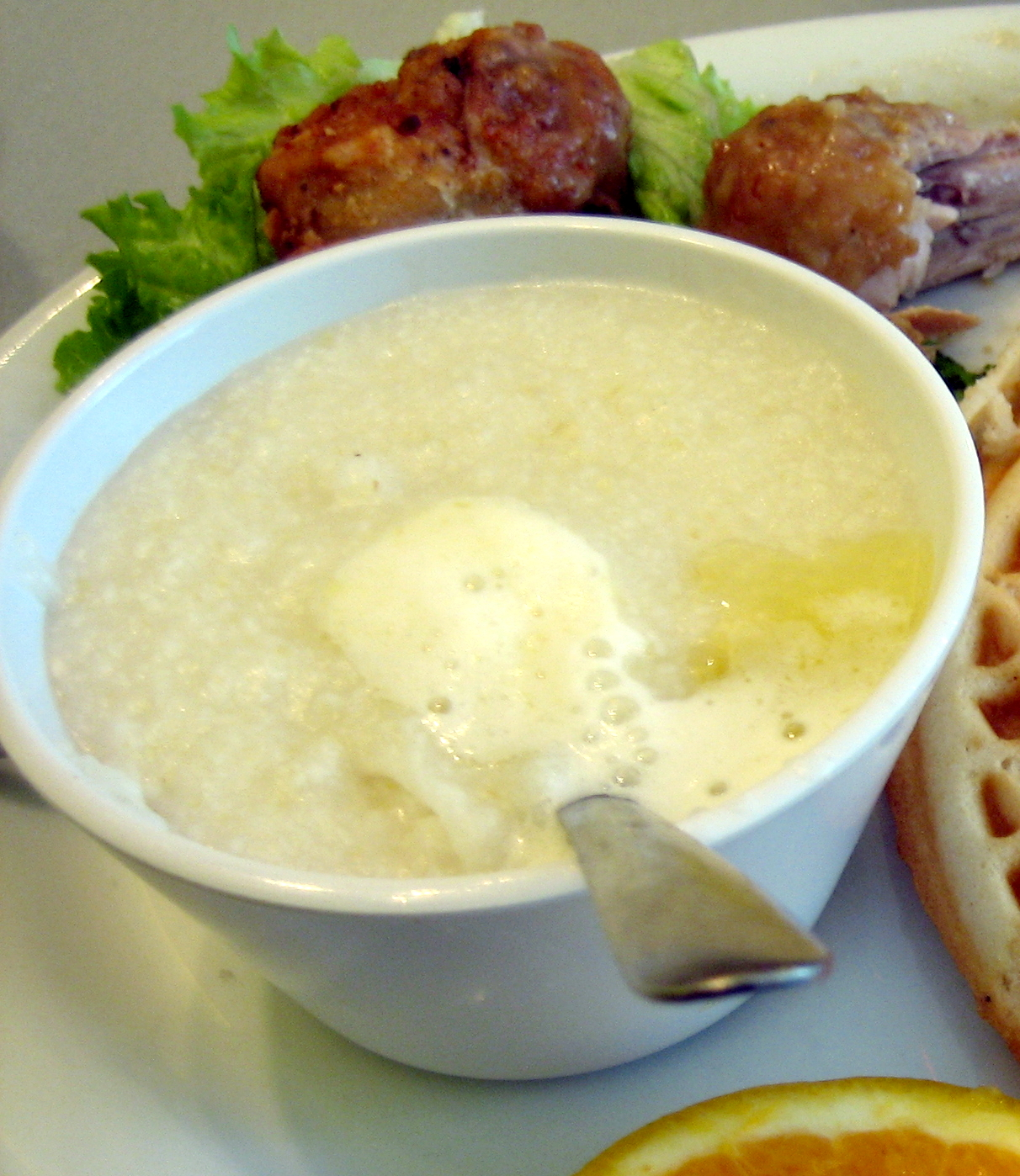
Prepared grits

Grits are prepared by mixing water or milk and the dry grits and stirring them over heat. If one uses cornmeal, the food is called mush. Whole-grain grits require much longer to become soft than "quick grits".

== Dishes ==
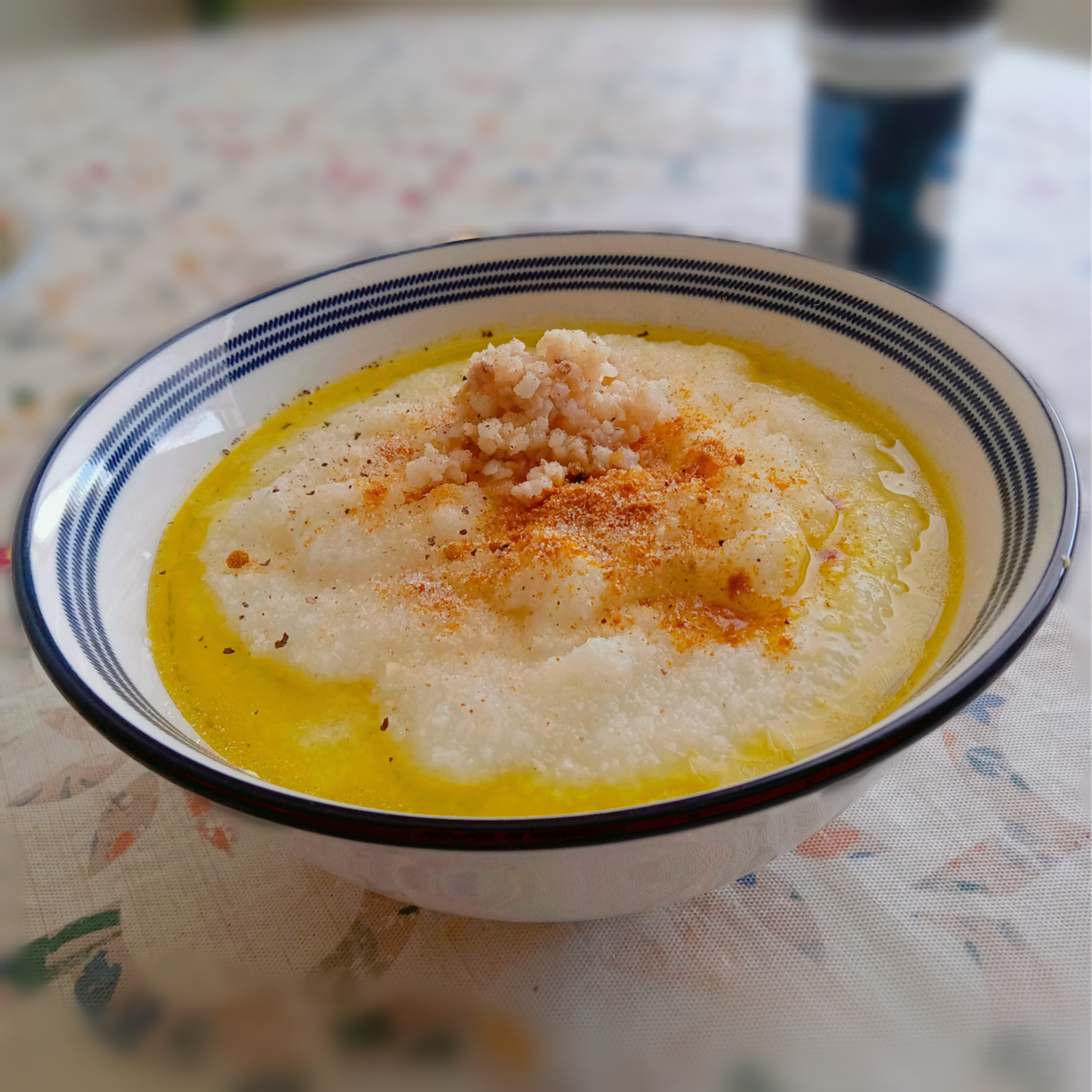
Creamy bowl of grits

Grits and grunts
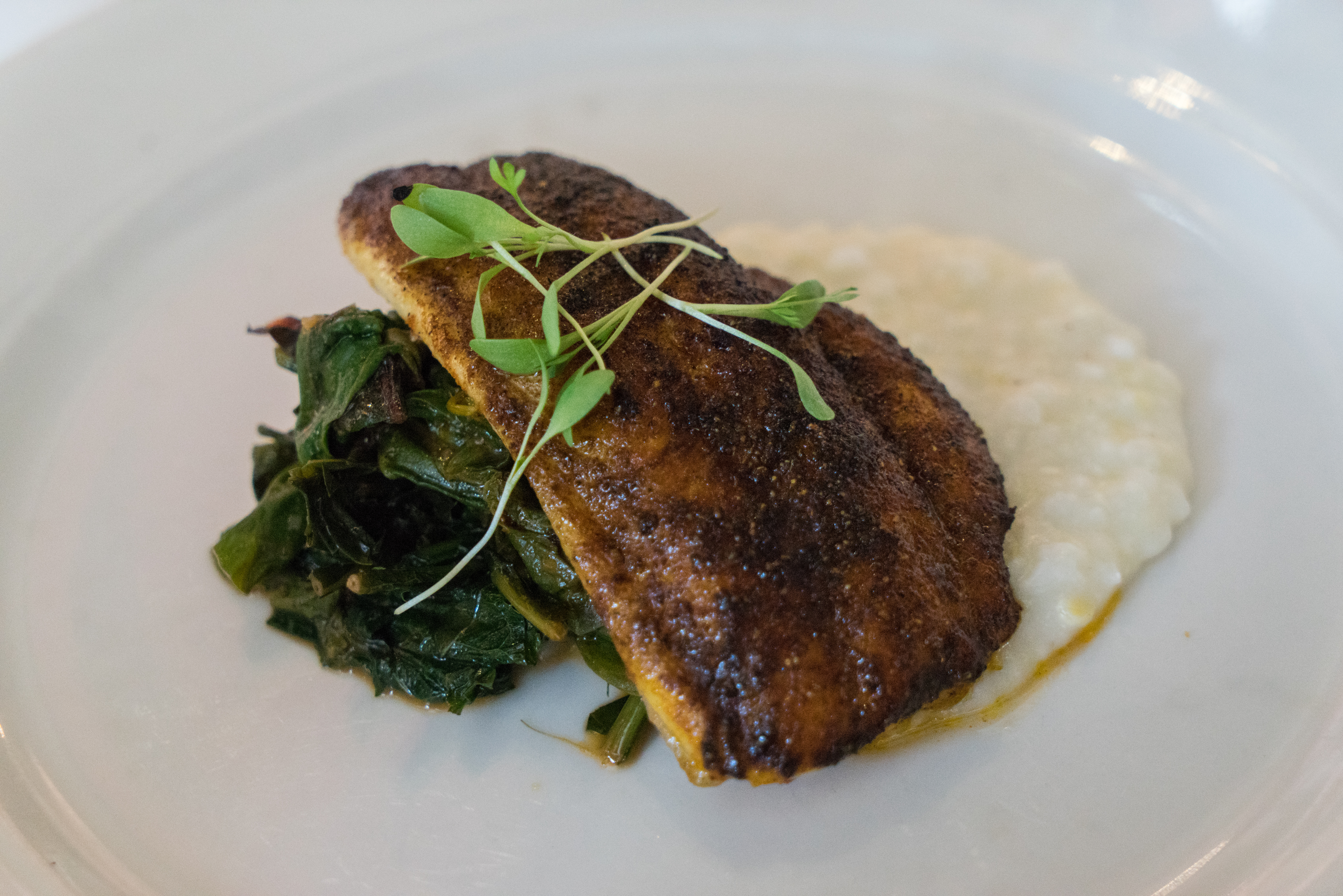
- Grits and grunts with dandelion greens and Swiss chard
- Type: Fried fish and porridge
- Course: Main course
- Place of origin: Key West, Florida
- Associated cuisine: American cuisine
- Serving temperature: Hot
- Main ingredients: Grits, white grunts or other fish

Grits are eaten with a wide variety of foods, such as eggs and bacon, fried catfish, shrimp, salmon croquettes, or country ham.

Shrimp and grits is a traditional dish in the coastal communities in the South Carolina Lowcountry and Georgia's Lower Coastal Plain.

Grits and grunts is a breakfast dish considered to be a staple of Floridian cuisine. The dish is prepared by serving small fried fish fillets, typically white grunts, over cooked grits. It was invented during the colonial period and became popular in Key West during the early 20th century. Barry Popik stated that this popularization occurred around 1900. Stetson Kennedy's book Grits and Grunts: Folkloric Key West was named after the dish.

Solidified cooked grits can be sliced and fried in vegetable oil, butter, or bacon grease to make fried grits, or they can first be breaded in beaten egg and bread crumbs.

== Gallery ==
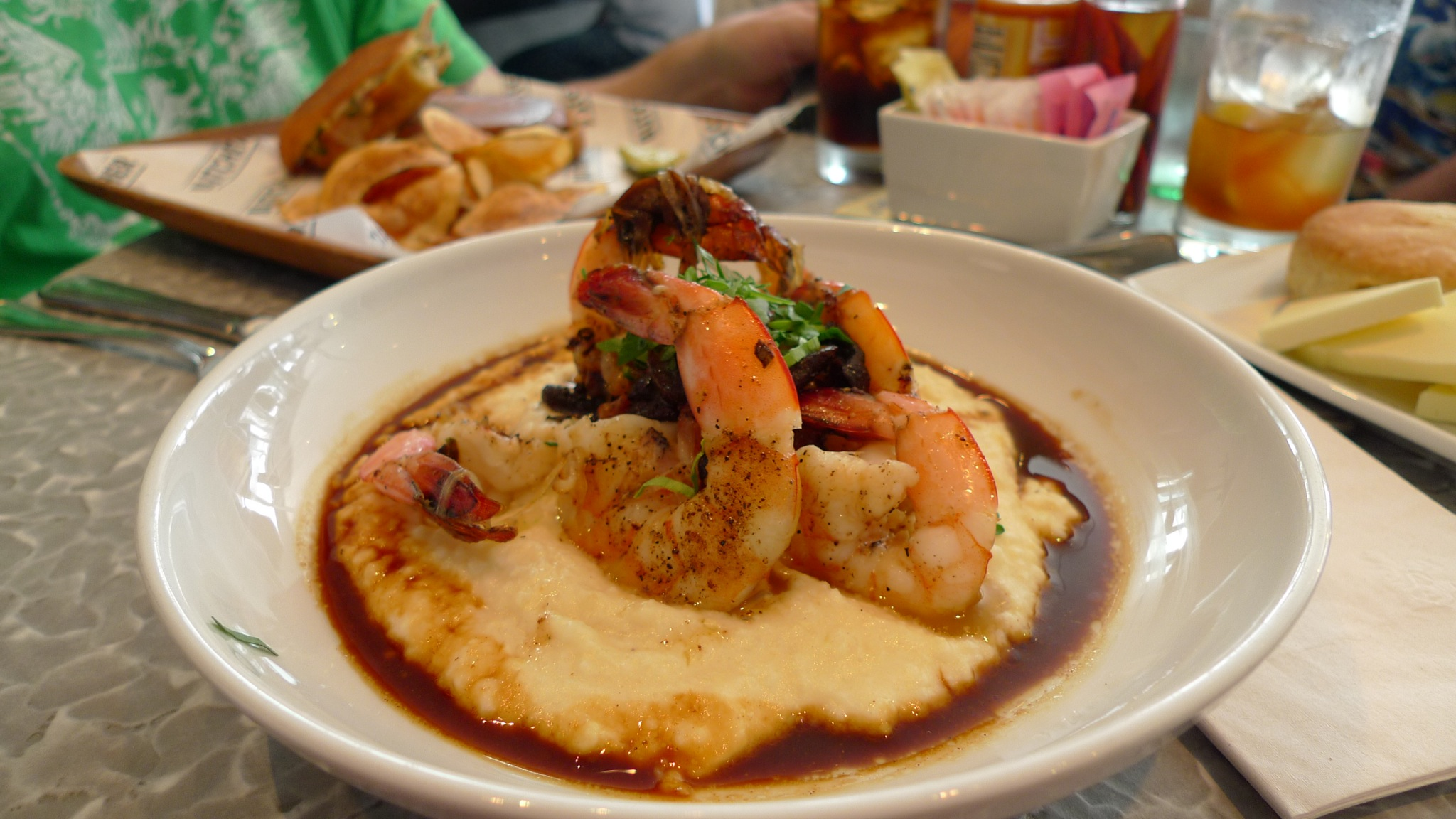
Shrimp and grits from Cochon Butcher in New Orleans

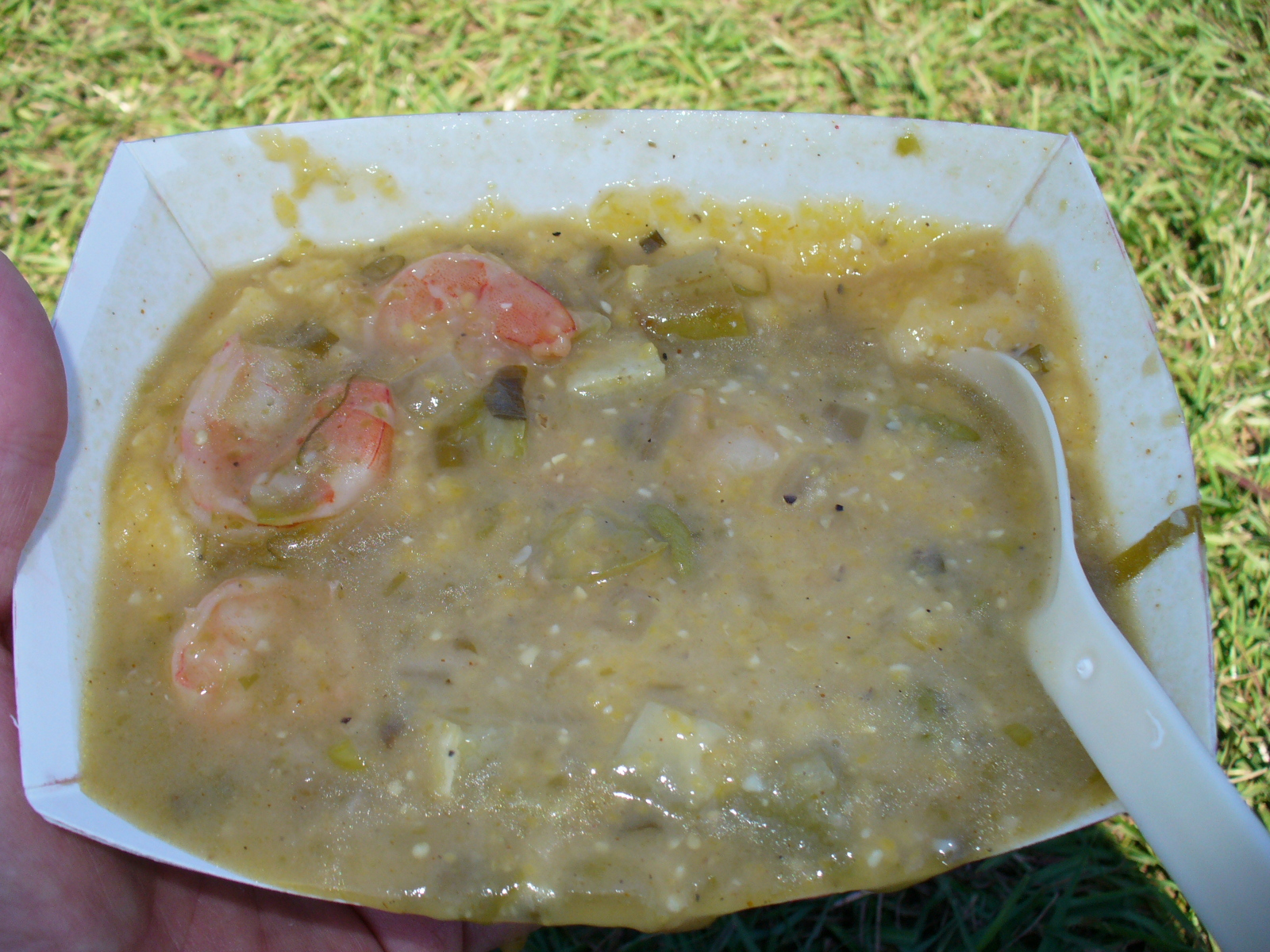
A lunch of mirliton, shrimp and grits from Karma Kitchen

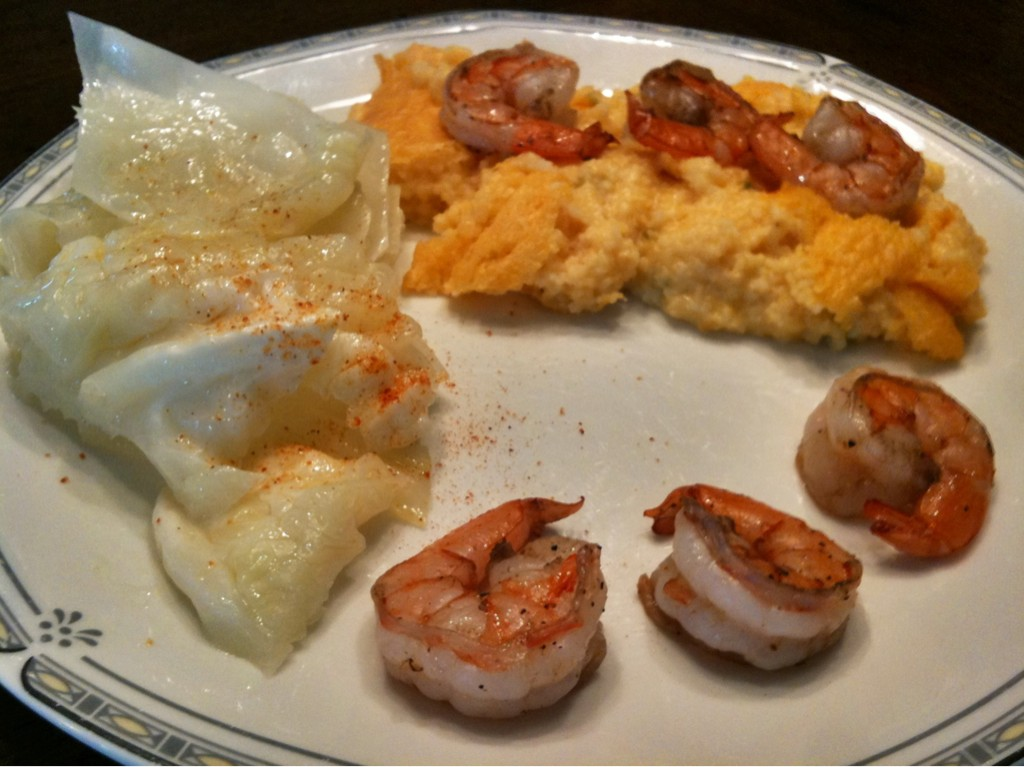
Shrimp and grits with cheddar cheese, chili peppers and jalapeños

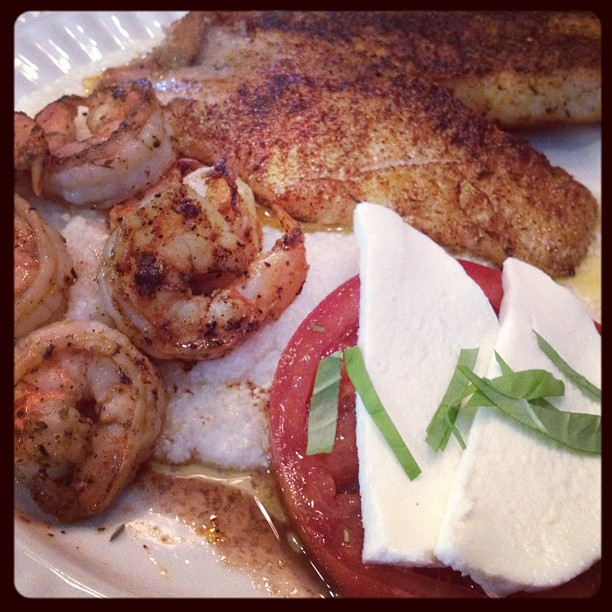
Shrimp and grits along with blackened fish and tomato mozzarella and basil (insalata Caprese)

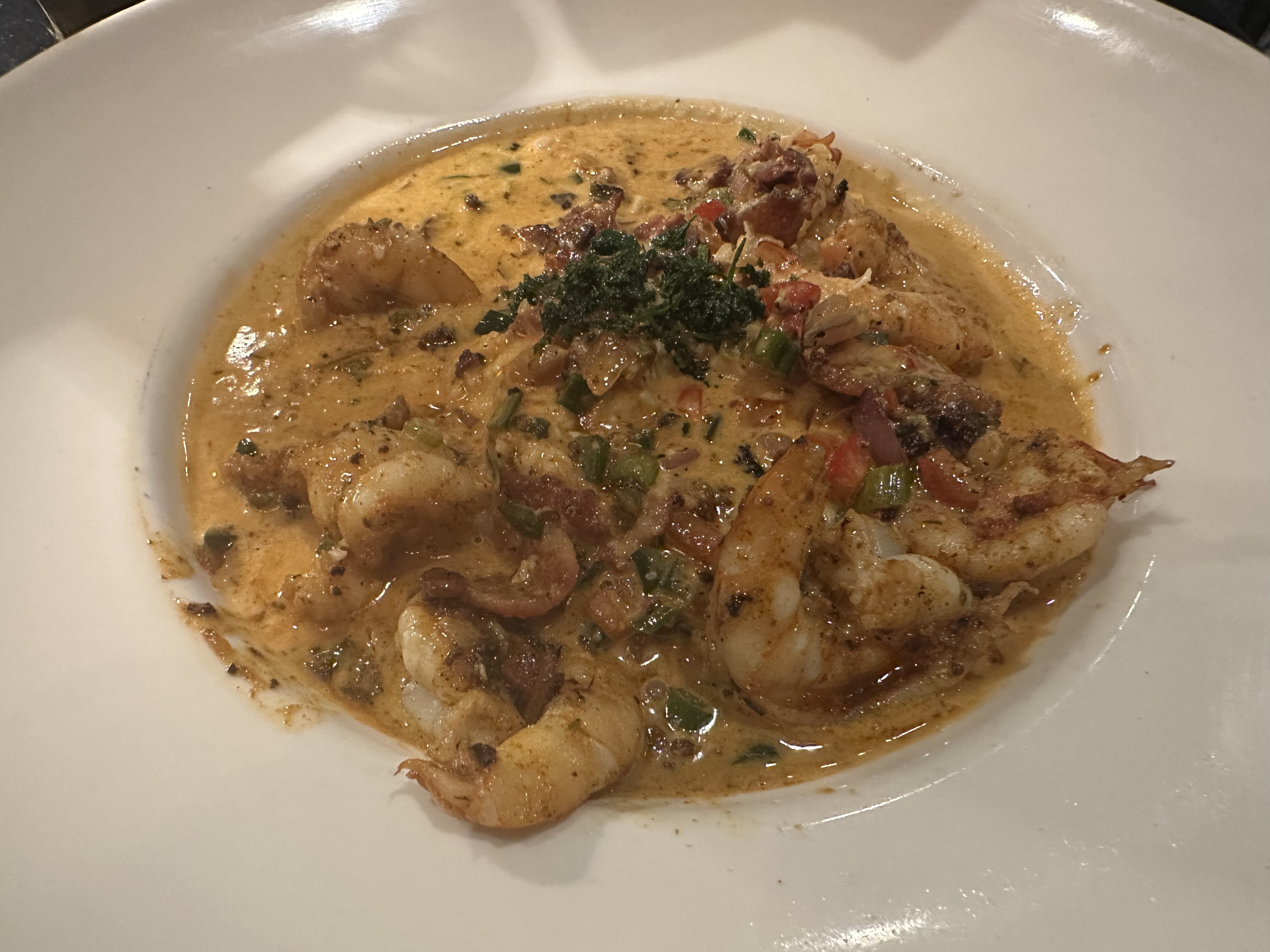
Shrimp and grits from Boudro's in San Antonio

== See also ==
- Bugas mais
- Creamed corn
- Cuisine of the Southern United States
- Cuisine of the United States
- Farina (food)
- Groats
- Hasty pudding
- List of porridges
- Mieliepap
- Mush (cornmeal)
- Mămăligă
- Semolina
- Three Sisters (agriculture)
- Ugali
