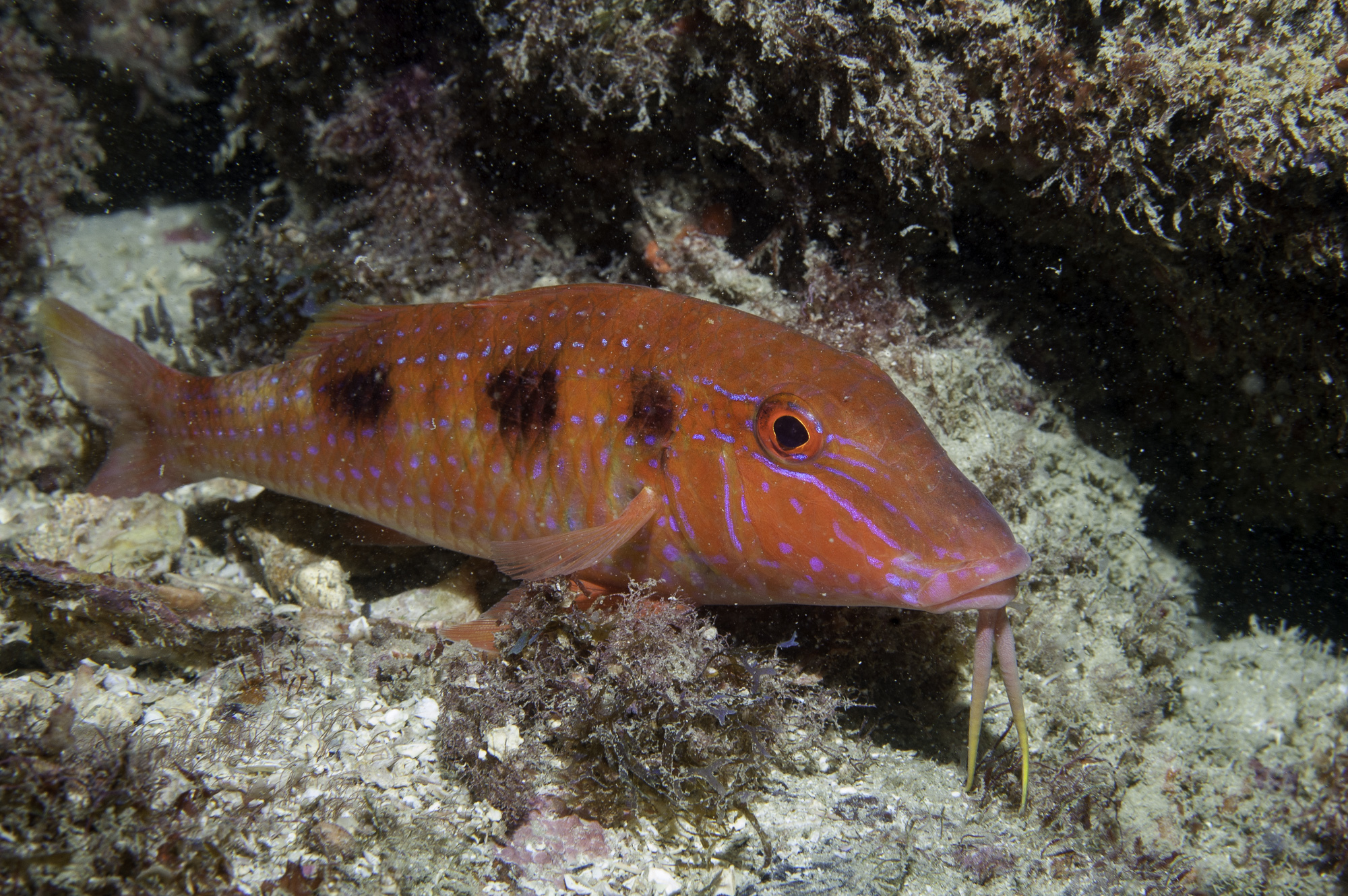

Conservation status
- Least Concern (IUCN 3.1)

Scientific classification
- Kingdom: Animalia
- Phylum: Chordata
- Class: Actinopterygii
- Order: Syngnathiformes
- Family: Mullidae
- Genus: Pseudupeneus
- Species: P. maculatus

Binomial name
- Pseudupeneus maculatus (Bloch, 1793)

Synonyms
- Mullus maculatus Bloch 1793

= Pseudupeneus maculatus =

Species of ray-finned fish

Pseudupeneus maculatus, the spotted goatfish, is a species from the family Mullidae. The species was originally described by Marcus Elieser Bloch in 1793. It occurs in the western Atlantic Ocean.
