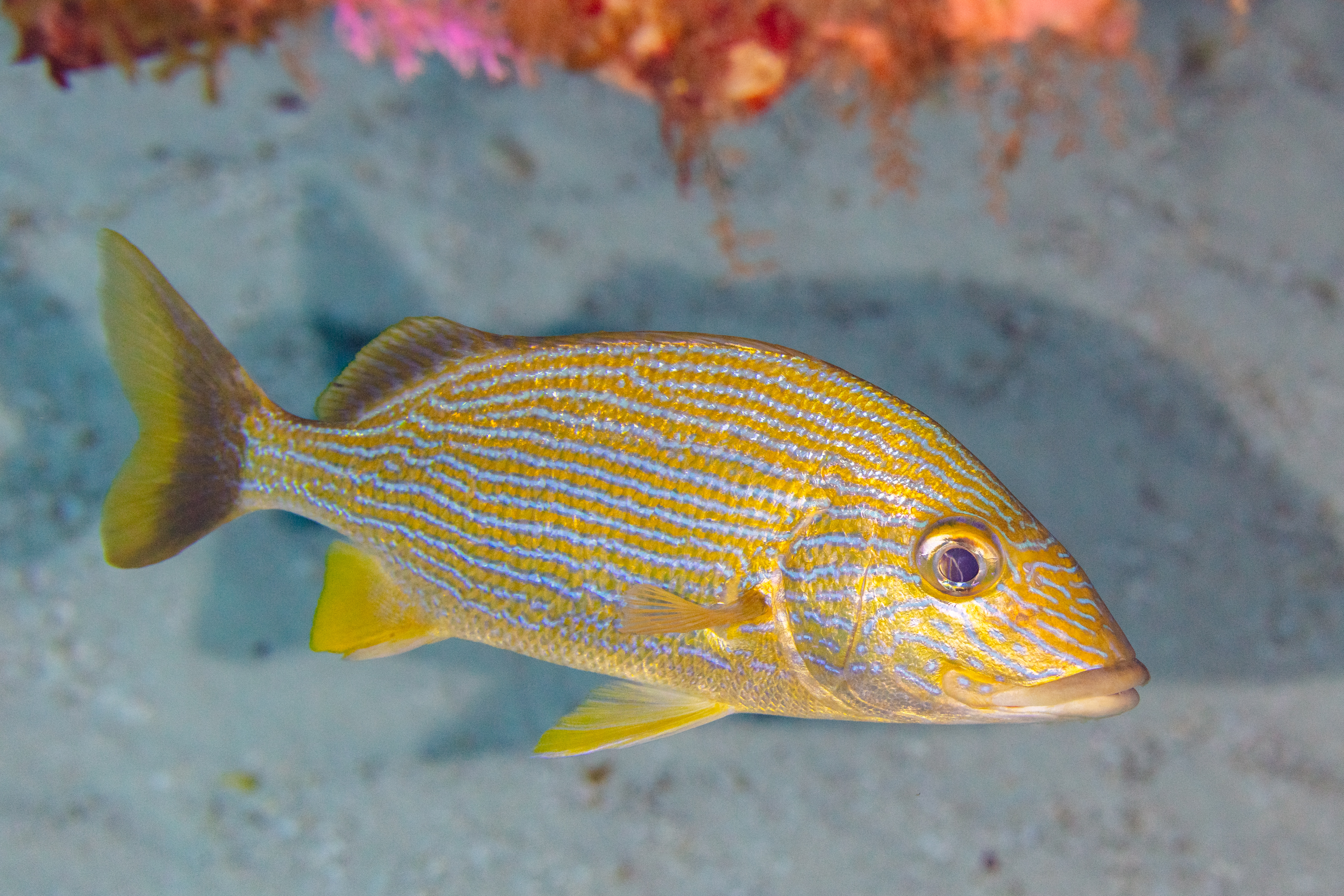

Conservation status
- Least Concern (IUCN 3.1)

Scientific classification
- Kingdom: Animalia
- Phylum: Chordata
- Class: Actinopterygii
- Order: Acanthuriformes
- Family: Haemulidae
- Genus: Haemulon
- Species: H. sciurus

Binomial name
- Haemulon sciurus (G. Shaw, 1803)

Synonyms
- Sparus sciurus G. Shaw 1803

= Bluestriped grunt =

Species of fish

The bluestriped grunt (Haemulon sciurus), also known as the boar grunt, golden grunt, humpback grunt, redmouth grunt, or yellow grunt, is a species of marine ray-finned fish, a grunt belonging to the family Haemulidae. It is found in the western Atlantic Ocean.

== Description ==
The bluestriped grunt has a deep, almond-shaped body with a moderately convex dorsal profile. Its upper jaw extends to underneath the centre of the eye. The scales above the lateral line are enlarged, whereas those underneath it are arranged in a diagonal pattern. It has a continuous dorsal fin with a small to medium-sized notch in its centre. The dorsal fin contains 12 spines and 16-17 soft rays, while the anal fin contains 3 spines and 9 soft rays. The overall colour of this species' head and body is yellow broken by thin, longitudinal blue stripes. Also, a distinctively arched stripe occurs below each eye. The spiny part of the dorsal fin is yellow, the soft-rayed part of the dorsal fin and the caudal fin are dark, the anal fin is sooty yellow, and the pelvic and pectoral fins are whitish. The inside of the mouth is a vivid red. The small juveniles, below lengths of 22 mm (0.87 in) have obvious melanophores on their caudal peduncles, and as the fish grows, these grow, too, forming a dark stripe starting just behind the eye and running to the caudal peduncle. Once a length of 50 mm (2.0 in) is attained, the fish changes to the adult colouration. This species attains a maximum total length of 46 cm (18 in), although 25 cm (9.8 in) is more typical.

== Distribution ==
The bluestriped grunt is found in the western Atlantic Ocean, from South Carolina and Bermuda south along the coast of the United States to the Bahamas. They extend into the Gulf of Mexico from the Florida Keys north as far as Cedar Key and from Tuxpan in Mexico along the northern coasts of the Yucatan Peninsula to northwestern Cuba, and in all of the Caribbean Sea.

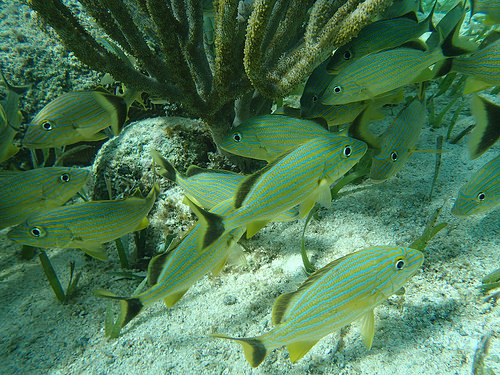
Blue Striped Grunts in Belize

== Habitat and biology ==
The bluestriped grunt is found in shallow water, at depths between 1 and 40 m (3 ft 3 in and 131 ft 3 in). It is common in mangroves, reefs, and beds of sea grass. The adults aggregate in small schools over coral and rocky beds, especially in the vicinity of drop-offs. The juveniles are very common among beds of turtle grass (Thalassia testudinum) in shallow waters. They forage in sea-grass beds and mangroves searching for smaller fishes, crustaceans, and bivalves. Foraging occurs at night; they rest in the day in rocky areas. The spawning behaviour of the bluestriped grunt is little known, but is known to take place from January to April in the Caribbean Sea. The larvae settle into sea-grass beds at lengths that range from 9 to 17 mm (0.35 to 0.67 in) as they grow into juveniles. These fish often display open-mouthed, head-on pushing each other backwards, and they also produce a grunting noise using pharyngeal teeth. They are preyed on by larger fish such as sharks and groupers, and among their known parasites is the monogenean, Encotyllabe spari.

== Systematics ==
The bluestriped grunt was first formally described in 1803 as Sparus sciurus by English zoologist George Shaw (1751-1813), with the type locality given as the Antilles. The specific name sciurus means "squirrel", squirrelfish being one of the vernacular names of this species at the time, presumably because of its production of grunts.

== Utilisation ==
The bluestriped grunt is caught using hook and line, traps, and seines. The catch is not recorded separately for this species. The flesh is normally sold fresh. It is rare in the aquarium trade but is more common in public aquarium displays due to its size.
