= Bioerosion =

Erosion of hard ocean substrates by living organisms

Bioerosion describes the breakdown of hard ocean substrates – and less often terrestrial substrates – by living organisms. Marine bioerosion can be caused by mollusks, polychaete worms, phoronids, sponges, crustaceans, echinoids, gastropods and fish; it can occur on coastlines, on coral reefs, and on ships; its mechanisms include biotic boring, drilling, rasping, and scraping. Overall, the species that cause this phenomenon are highly diverse coming from several kingdoms of life. On dry land, bioerosion is typically performed by trees, pioneer plants, or plant-like organisms such as lichen. Terrestrial bioerosion is performed by either chemical (e.g. by acidic secretions on limestone) or mechanical processes (e.g. by roots growing into cracks). In marine systems bioerosion occurs on nearly all coastlines, and all reef systems.

Bioerosion by endolithic organisms is also well known in the fossil record on shells and hardgrounds, with traces of this activity stretching back well into the Precambrian (see gallery). Macrobioerosion, which produces borings visible to the naked eye, shows two distinct evolutionary radiations. One was in the Middle Ordovician (the Ordovician Bioerosion Revolution) and the other in the Jurassic. Microbioerosion also has a long fossil record and its own radiations.

== Reef Bioerosion ==
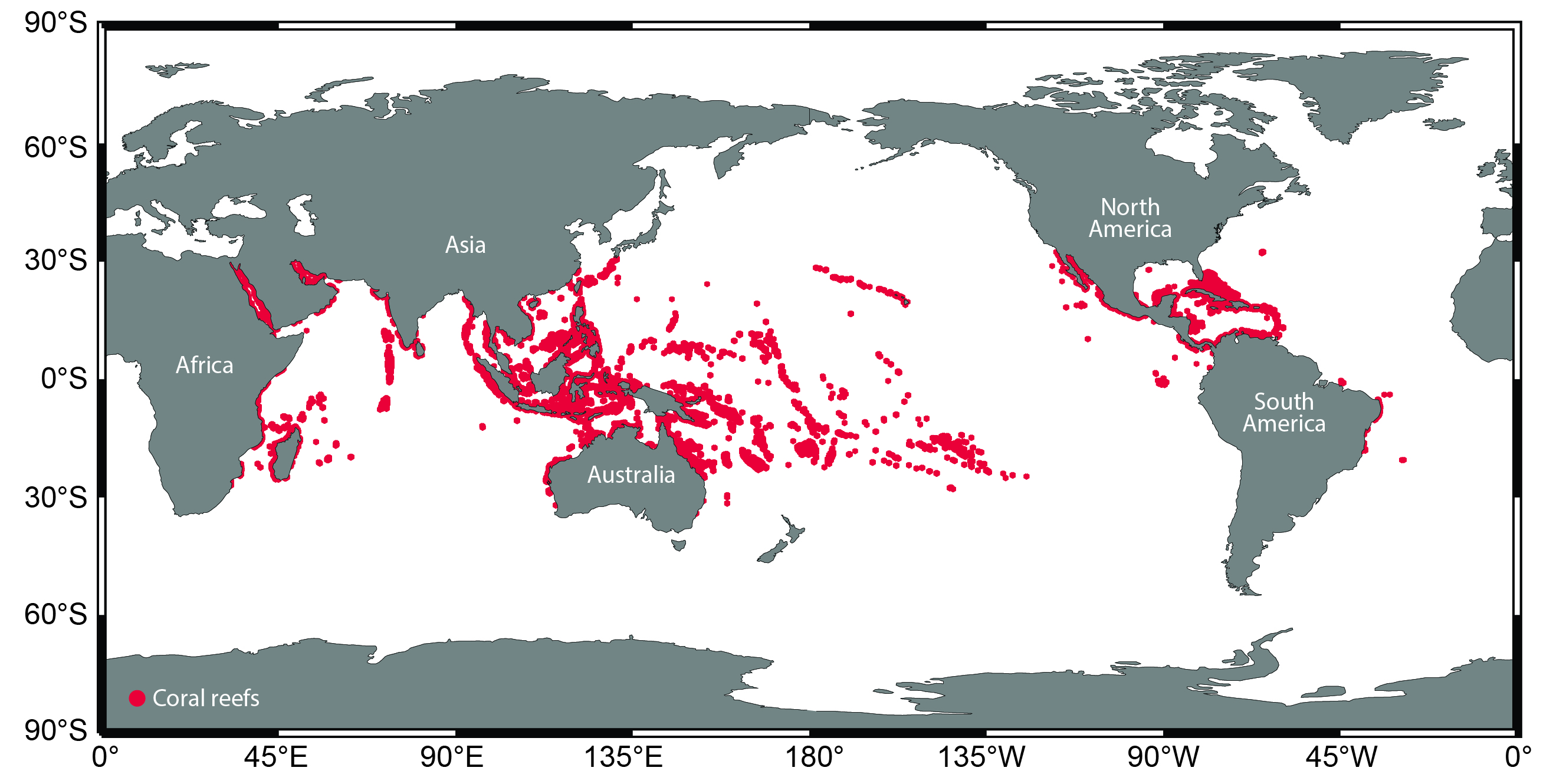
Map of the global distribution of reef-building corals.

Bioerosion of coral reefs generates rocks, the fine and white coral sand characteristic of tropical islands, and silt. The coral skeleton of both live and dead corals are converted to sand by internal and external bioeroders generating various sizes of sediment. While the reef structure is degraded, reef building organisms rebuild the reef in a delicately balanced carbonate budget where the overall growth of reefs out competes their degradation by a small margin. It is also important to note that while not traditionally considered within the term bioerosion larger prey fish such as sharks can break off larger chunks of reefs when in pursuit of prey or by humans by causing direct physical damage to a reef.

=== Internal Bioerosion ===
Internal bioeroders (borers) are organisms that break down the calcium carbonate coral skeletons while living within them and include two categories: Chasmoliths and endoliths. This occurs at various depths within the reef from a few micrometers to several cm and via mechanical, chemical, or both processes. Internal bioeroders such as algae, fungi, bacteria (microborers), protists, sponges (Clionaidae), bivalves (including Lithophaga), sipunculans, polychaetes, acrothoracican barnacles, and phoronids, generate extremely fine sediment with diameters of 10 to 100 micrometres while eroding corals.

==== Porifera ====
Sponges in the genera Cliona, Anthosigmella, and Spheciospongia are the most destructive and predominant bioerosive sponges. All three genera are endolithic, mechanical, excavators that usually only bore into the top 2 cm of the coral skeleton (microbioerosion) and branch significantly similarly to the roots of some plants; however, some species in the order Siphonodictyon bore large holes up to 12 cm into the reef (macrobioerosion). The microerosive sponges mechanically etch uniformly shaped 0.05 mm flakes of skeletal structure out of the holes leaving them with a pitted internal surface; these are also mechanically removed by the sponge via the sponges canal system.

Boring sponges generally have a difficult time establishing on live corals. However, over the past couple of decades there have been a multitude of coral bleaching events leaving swaths of dead reefs around the globe. Due to the increased amounts of dead corals without their replacement by new live corals, bleached reef systems have been overrun with boring sponges that are actively breaking down reef systems removing habitat for fish, crustaceans, corals, and various other organisms. There is alternative evidence to suggest that increasing temperatures are affecting the sponges similarly to how they affect corals.

==== Annelid Worms ====
Two classes within phylum Annelida primarily contribute to reef bioerosion: Polychaeta and Sipuncula. Polychaetes are more prominent in specific locations and environments, and these worms are capable of boring 0.5–2 mm holes up to 10 cm into the reef skeletal structure via both mechanical and chemical means. The primary families of polychaetes that participate in reef erosion are: Cirratulidae, Eunicidae, Sabellidae, and Spionidae. Cirratulidae are the primary pioneer colonizers of reef systems and are later colonized primarily by Sabellidae with their primary activity being during the summer usually leaving their borings during the winter months. While polychaetes are significant reef borers the cycle and relationship between which families occupy which reefs and when is yet to be understood.

=== External Bioerosion ===
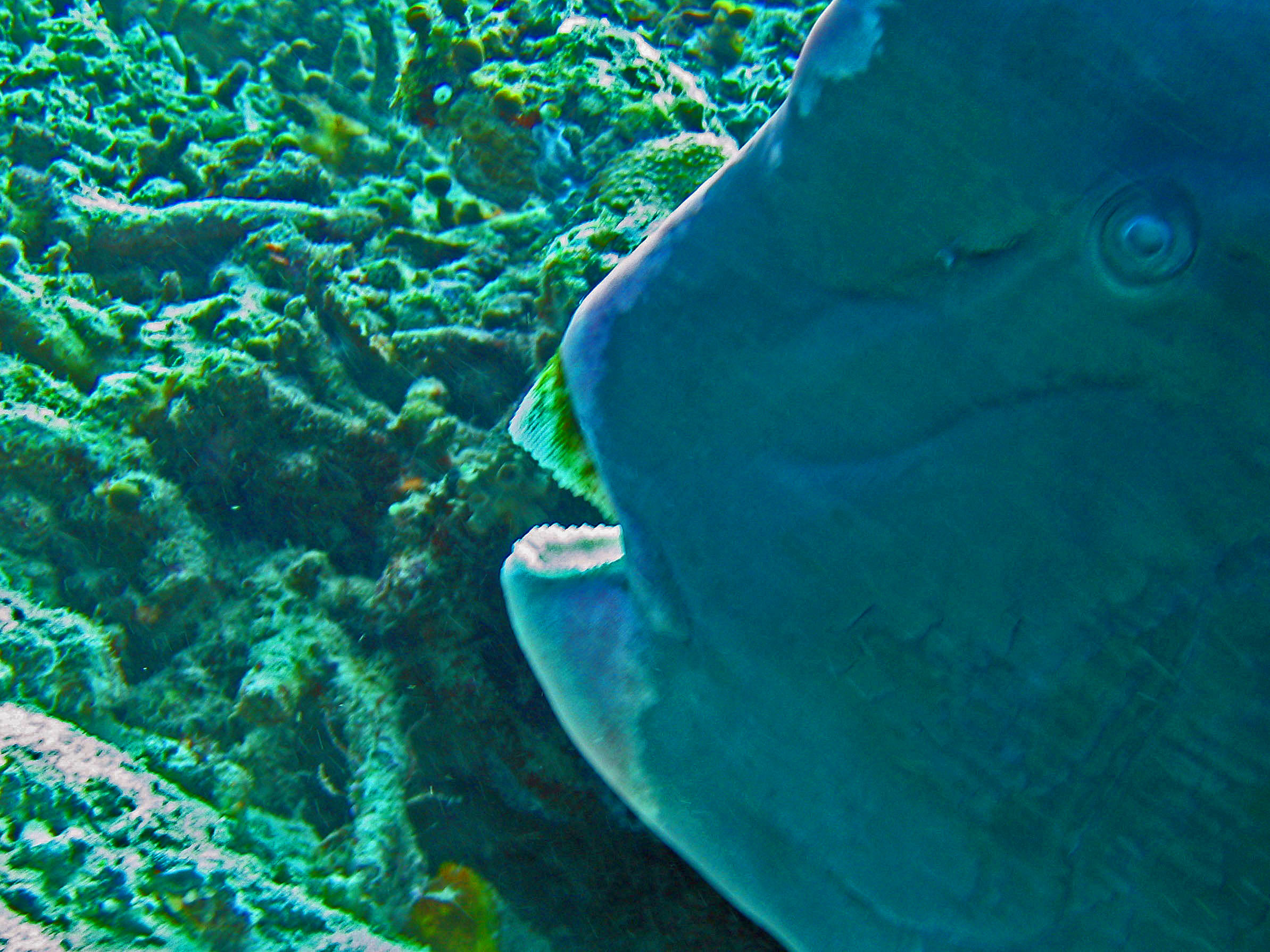
A parrot fish (Bolbometopon muricatum) eating algae off of a rock in Borneo.

External bioeroders (grazers) are organisms that are visually identifiable on the surface of or around the reef structure. External bioeroders include sea urchins (such as Diadema), chitons, and marine fish, all of which are dubbed epiliths. Sea urchin erosion of calcium carbonate has been reported in some reefs at annual rates exceeding 10 kg/m^{2}. Fish also erode coral while eating algae. Parrotfish cause a great deal of bioerosion using well developed jaw muscles, tooth armature, and a pharyngeal mill, to grind ingested material into sand-sized particles.

==== Parrotfish ====
Parrotfish (Scaridae) are one of many families of fish that feed upon algae that grows on reef systems capable of extensive excavation of the reef skeleton. These fish primarily bite portions of the structure that stick out from the surface of the reef smoothing the overall terrain. These fish are also occasionally known to predate upon live corals which can have a deleterious affect. However, the benefits these fish provide to reefs in the form of increased growth, fecundity, and removal of algal competitors aiding in coral recruitment outweigh the negatives of their predation upon coral species. In one study, bioerosion of coral reef aragonite by an individual parrotfish was estimated to occur at a rate of 1017.7±186.3 kg/yr (0.41±0.07 m^{3}/yr) for Chlorurus gibbus and 23.6±3.4 kg/yr (9.7*10^{−3}±1.3*10^{−3} m^{3}/yr) for Chlorurus sordidus. On rare occasion, parrotfish leave large scars on live coral (8.25 cm^{2}) which account for 86% of all live coral tissue grazed upon by parrotfish. Additionally, parrotfish have a preference for grazing upon certain species of live coral (Orbicella annularis in the Caribbean), and are reducing those species ability to survive and compete in reef ecosystems. This, over time, may reduce the genetic diversity of corals and could cause an increased effect of bioerosion to reef growth in reefs.

== Microbioerosion ==
=== Algae ===
Species of green and red algae are the primary designations of algae that cause bioerosion in reef settings. These algae can be both chasmoliths, occurring in cracks of rock and coral skeleton surfaces, or endoliths existing beneath the top layer of corals and their skeletons. In reef systems, algae, specifically Ostreobium, has been found to be one of the more prominent microbioeroders present. Of the endoliths, boring green algae of various species thrive beneath the surface of the coral skeleton where light is still capable of penetrating. This forms a green band within the calcium carbonate structure called the Ostreobium band due to the presence of Ostreobium species present there.

Ostreobium is a genus of green algae that is a symbiont in almost all corals globally. While most research done in the past twenty years has been on its biodiversity and importance in mitigating damage done by coral bleaching events as a mutualistic symbiont, previous research looked more into its activity as a parasitic bioeroder. Due to difficulty in culturing these species of algae, scientists have not been able to determine the exact effect that these algae have on reef systems, but it seems likely that depending on highly specific environmental conditions Ostreobium can act in both a parasitic and mutualistic symbiosis with corals.

=== Fungi ===
The primary mechanism of fungi bioerosion in reef systems is through chemical dissolution of the calcium carbonate structure. This enables their hyphae to penetrate deep into the coral skeleton as the mycelium grows reducing the foundational integrity of coral reefs. While these organisms importantly impact reef systems they are also known to degrade soft corals (those without a carbonate skeleton), other calcareous sediments, and the shells of mollusks.

Fungi, specifically Aspergillus sydowii, are known to infect corals causing disease. While this in itself doesn't directly attribute to fungal bioerosion, reefs need to be actively producing more carbonate skeleton mass than is deteriorated through erosive processes to grow. Through the combined efforts of all bioeroding organisms disease in corals (both fungal and bacterial) diminish the overall growth of a coral reef which is their largest effect on bioerosion. One study found the effects of microbioerosion as a whole to be between 0.15 and 0.35 kg m^{−2} y^{−1} but noted that fungi only make up a relatively small portion of that value.

Additionally, as eutrophication and acidification of the oceans increases due to the anthropogenic factors causing climate change fungal presence in marine ecosystems becomes more diverse and abundant. Ocean acidification specifically is accentuated by fungal bioerosion during the dissolution of calcium carbonate by releasing carbon dioxide as a biproduct. This accentuates the effects of bioerosion on reef systems causing further degradation of coral reefs, and it is another source of CO_{2} release into the ocean.

== Gallery ==
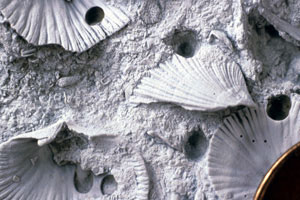
Trypanites borings in an Upper Ordovician hardground, southeastern Indiana.

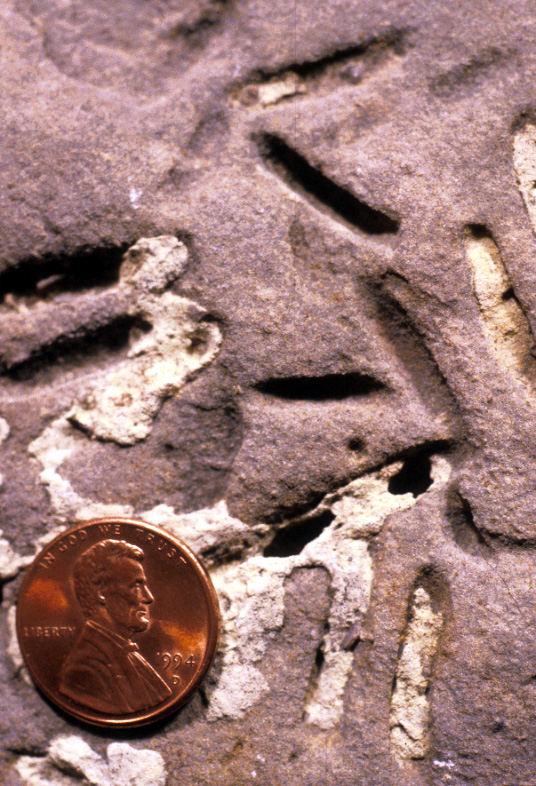
Petroxestes borings in an Upper Ordovician hardground, southern Ohio.

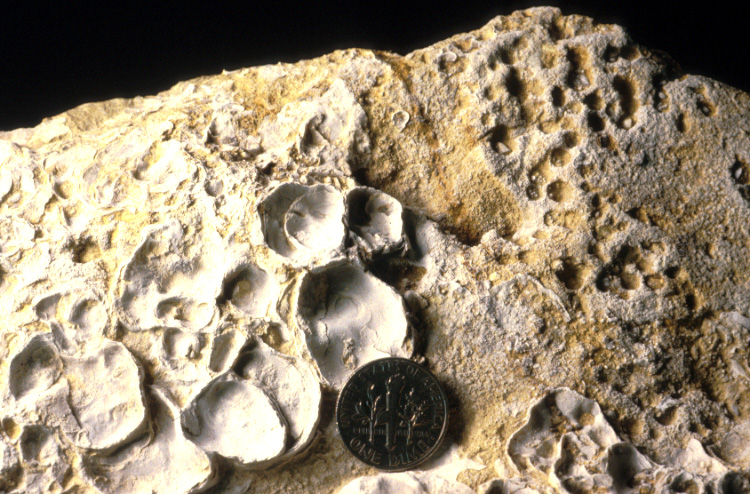
Gastrochaenolites borings in a Middle Jurassic hardground, southern Utah.

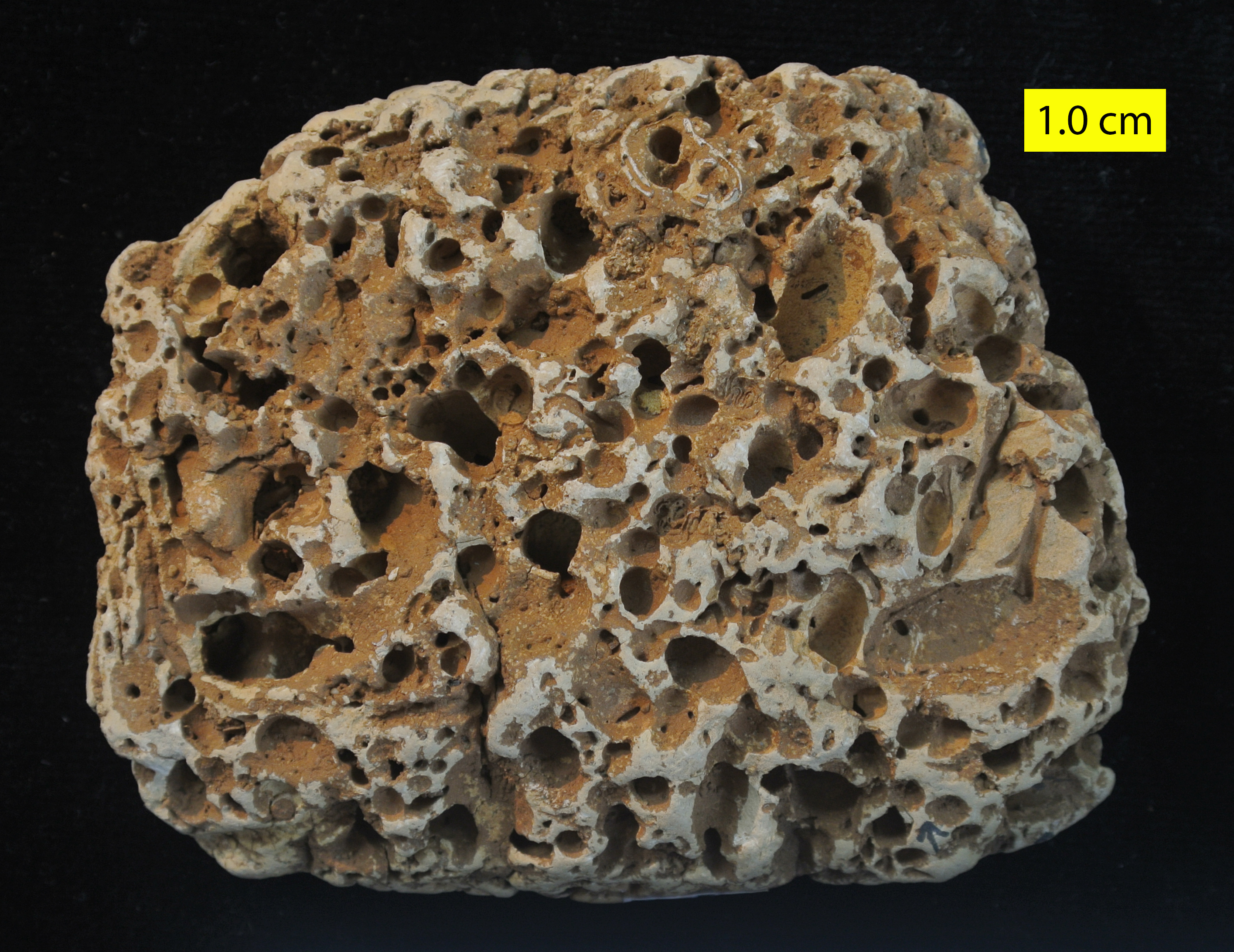
Numerous borings in a Cretaceous cobble, Faringdon, England.

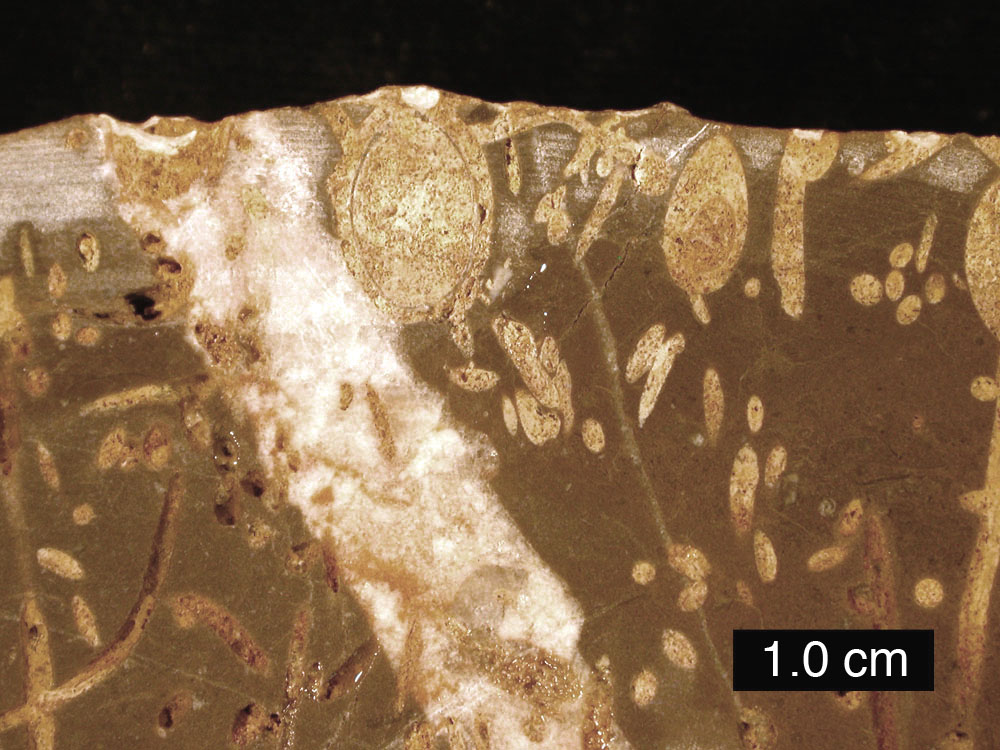
Cross-section of a Jurassic rockground; borings include Gastrochaenolites (some with boring bivalves in place) and Trypanites; Mendip Hills, England; scale bar = 1 cm.

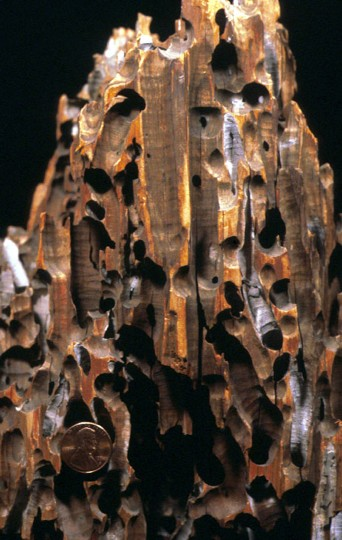
Teredolites borings in a modern wharf piling; the work of bivalves known as "shipworms".

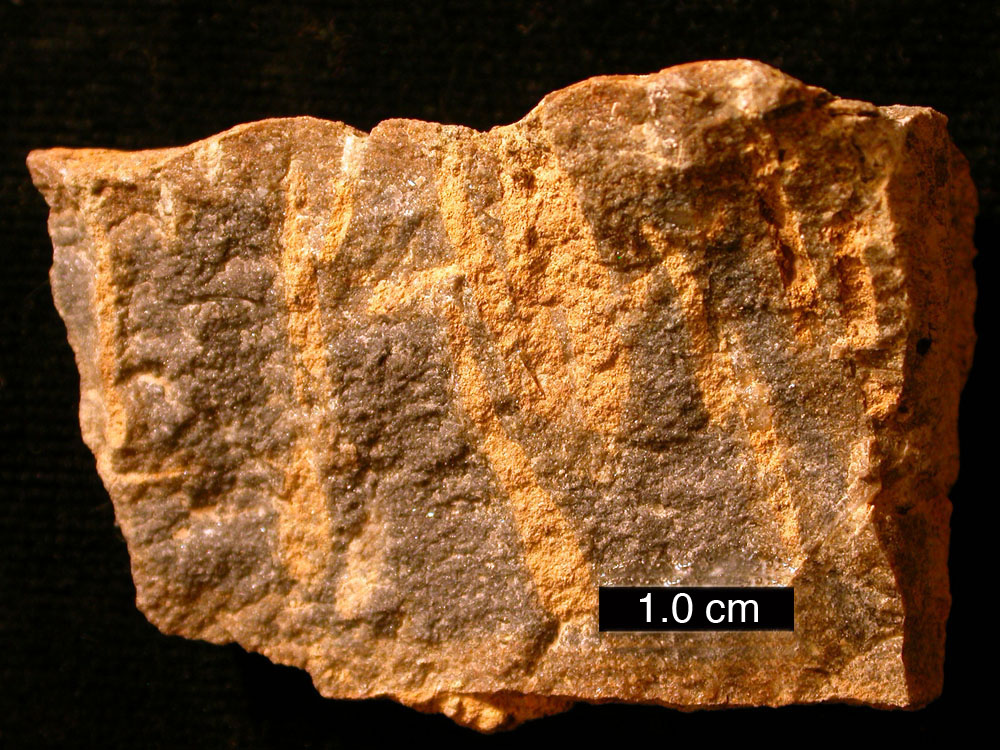
Ordovician hardground cross-section with Trypanites borings filled with dolomite; southern Ohio.

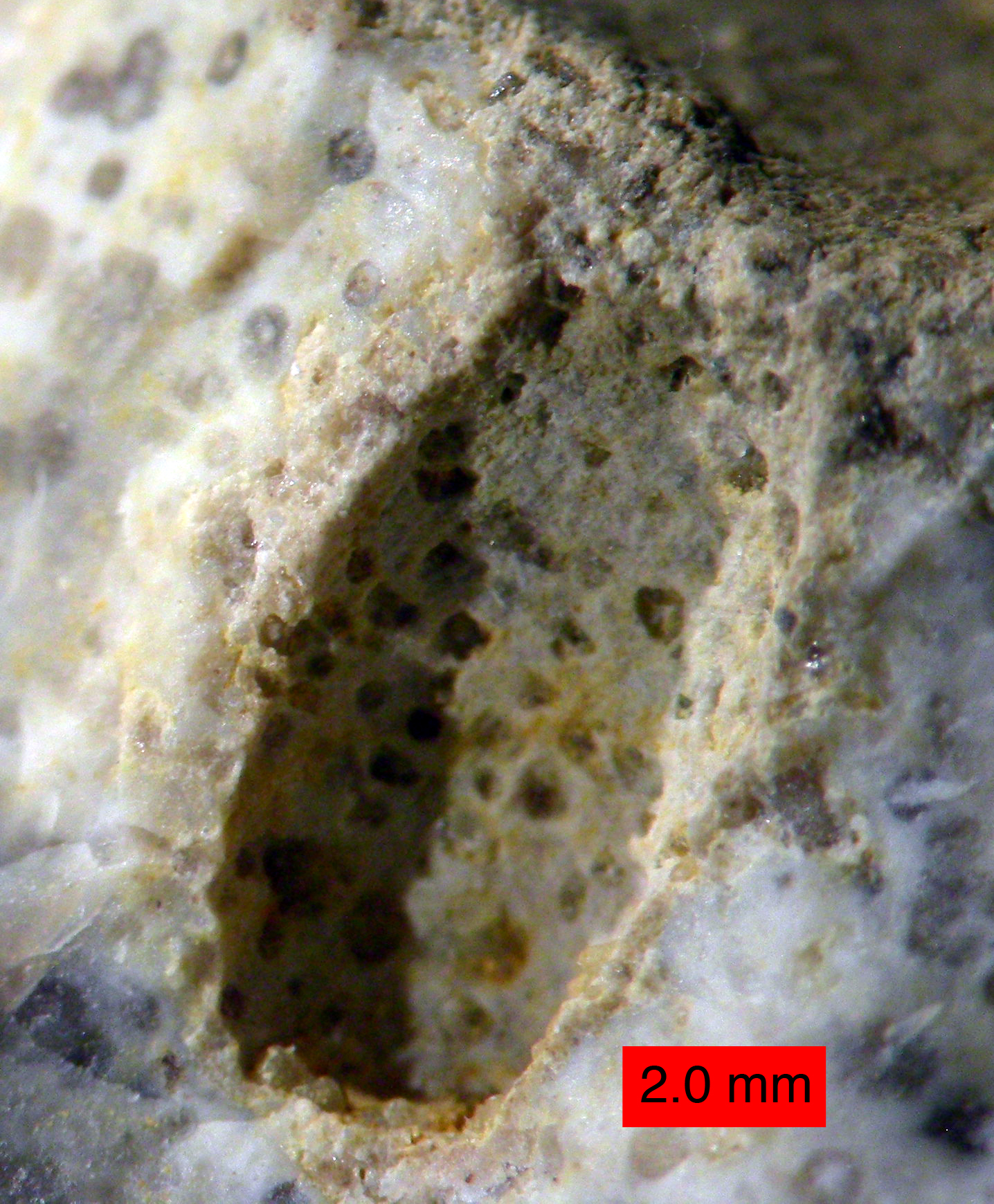
Gastrochaenolites boring in a recrystallized scleractinian coral, Matmor Formation (Middle Jurassic) of southern Israel.

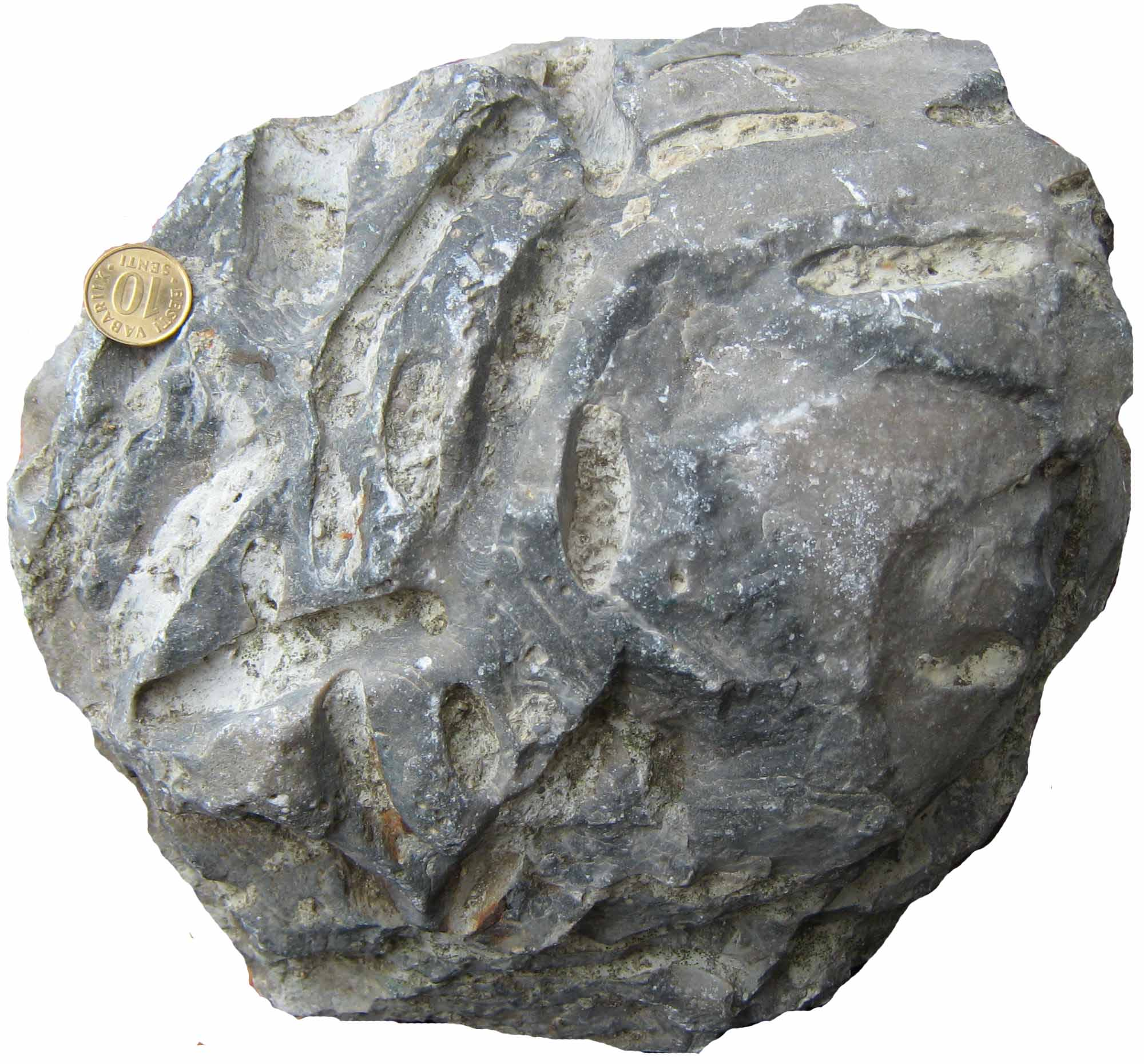
Osprioneides borings in a Silurian stromatoporoid from Saaremaa, Estonia.

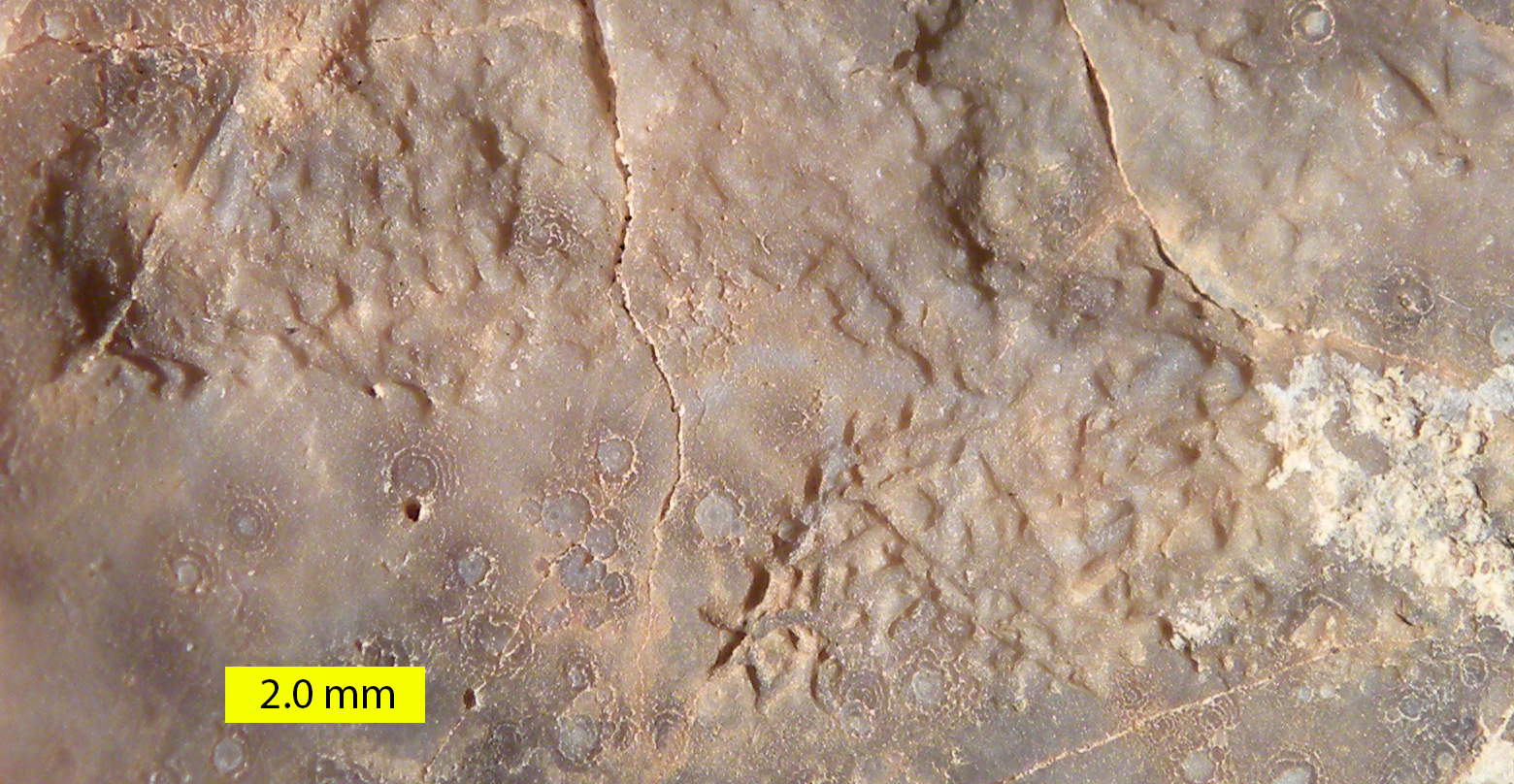
Gnathichnus pentax echinoid trace fossil on an oyster from the Cenomanian of Hamakhtesh Hagadol, southern Israel.

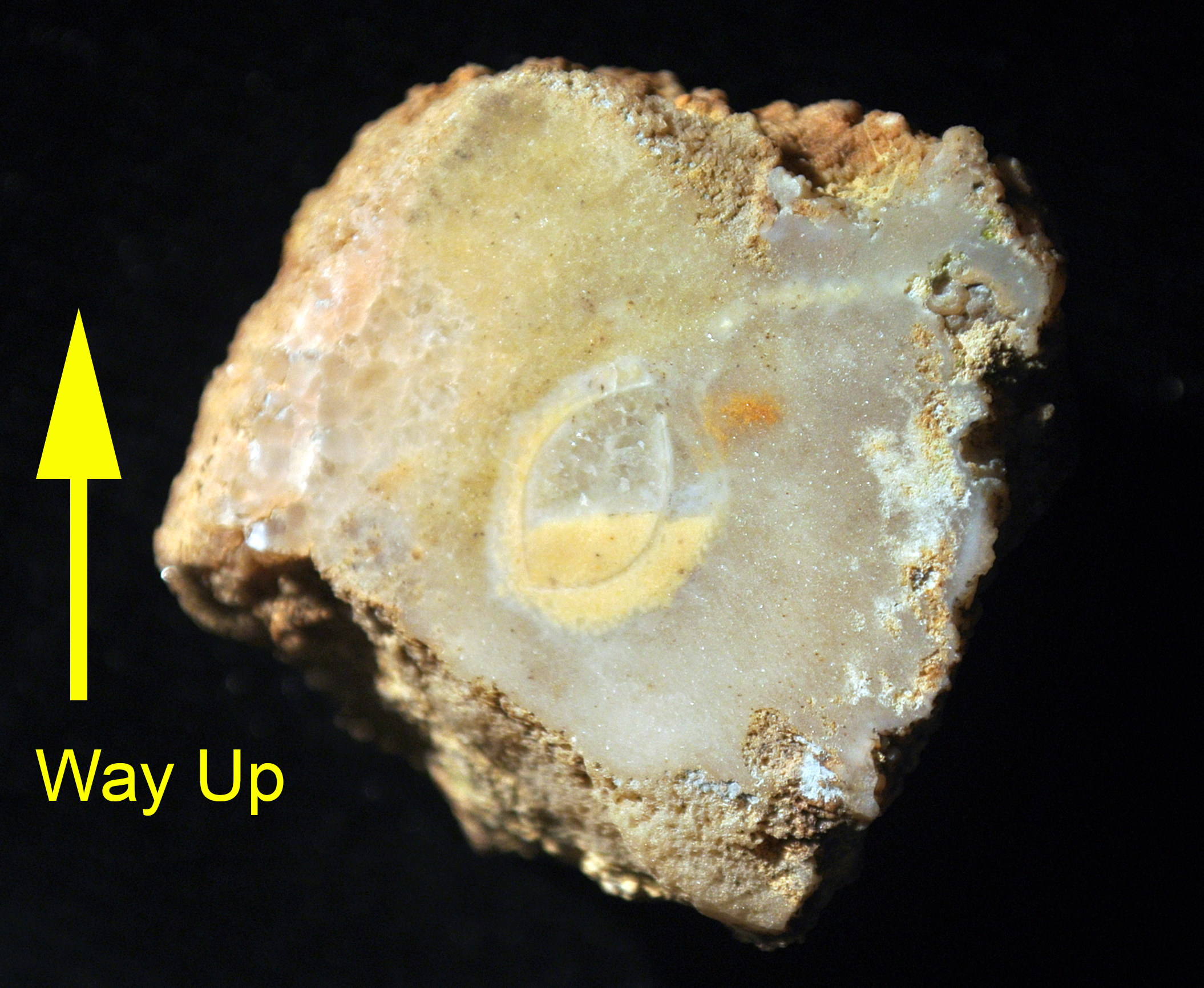
Geopetal structure in bivalve boring in coral; bivalve shell visible; Matmor Formation (Middle Jurassic), southern Israel.

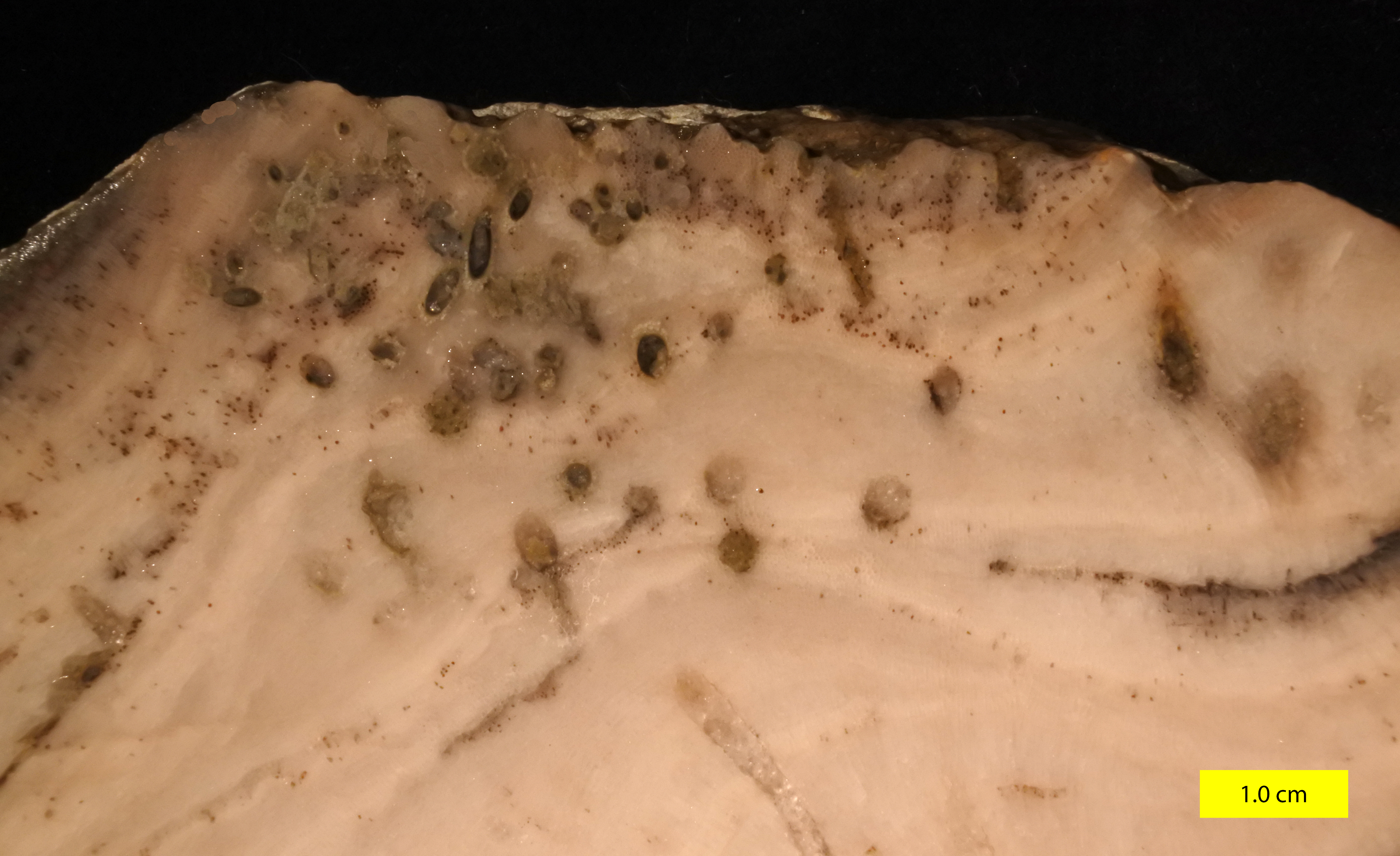
Borings in an Upper Ordovician bryozoan, Bellevue Formation, northern Kentucky; polished cross-section.

== See also ==
- Biopitting
- Geomorphology – Scientific study of landforms
  - Biogeomorphology – Study of interactions between organisms and the development of landforms
  - Coastal erosion – Displacement of land along the coastline
- Marine biogenic calcification
