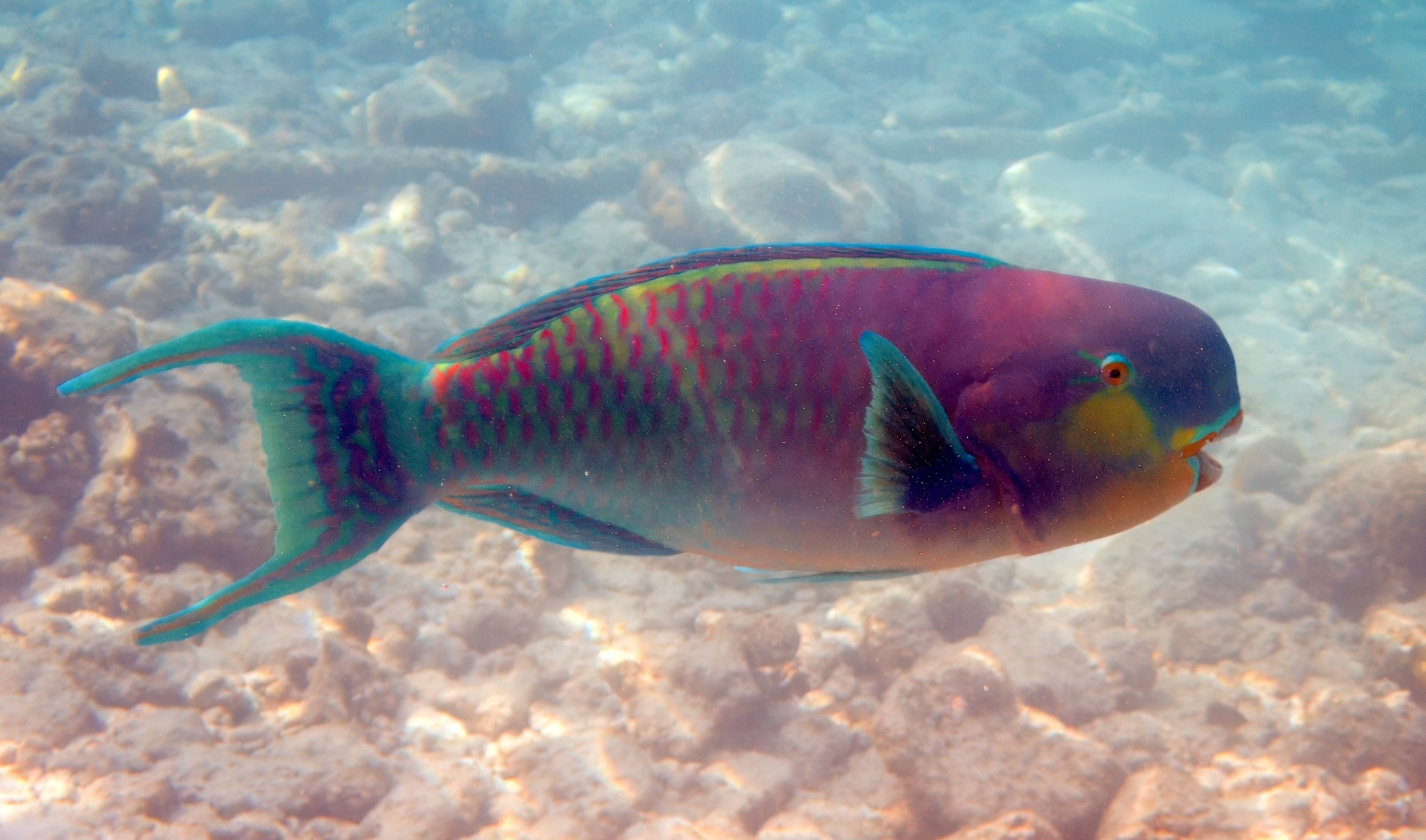

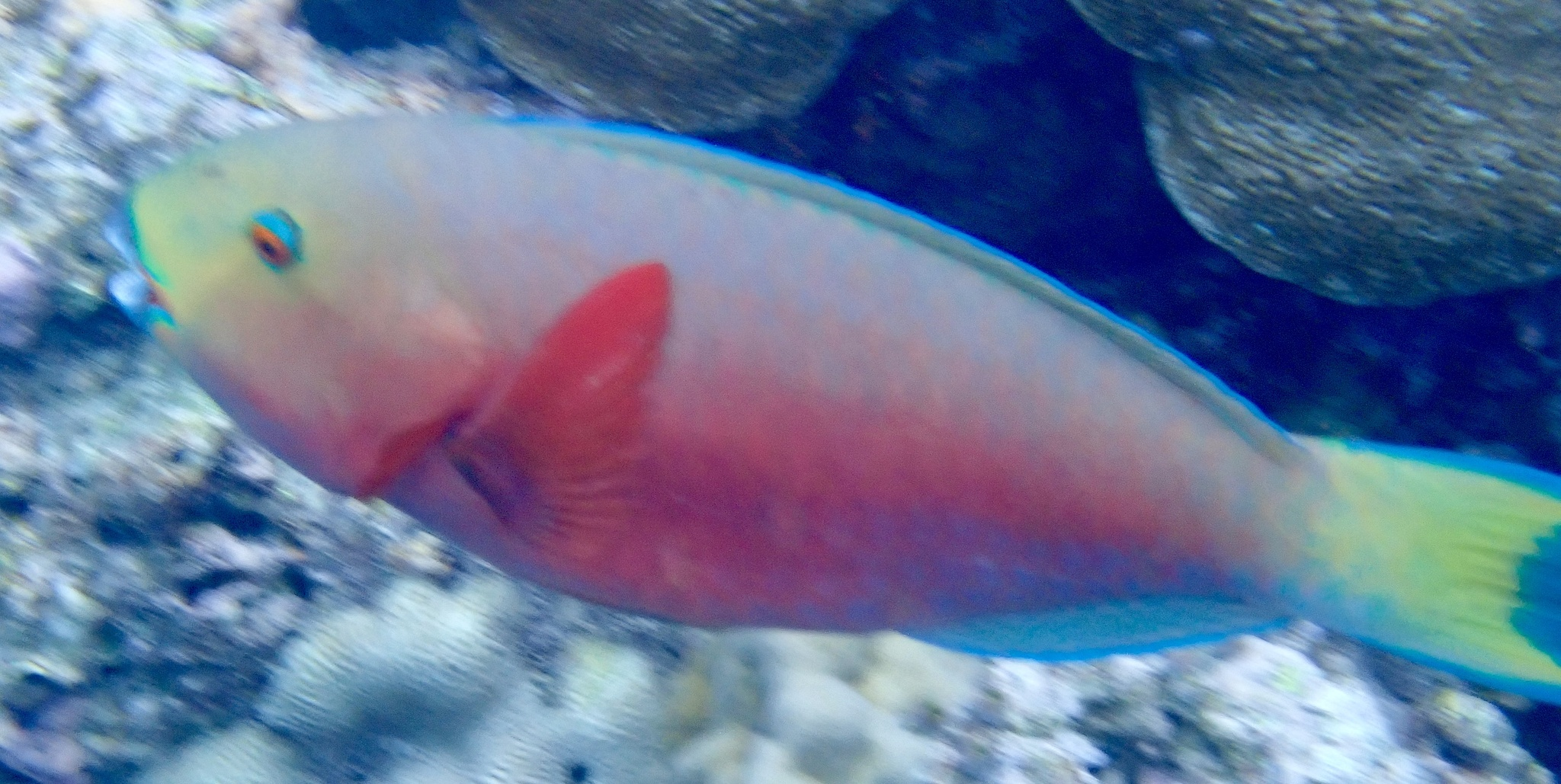
- Male (top) and female (bottom)

Conservation status
- Least Concern (IUCN 3.1)

Scientific classification
- Kingdom: Animalia
- Phylum: Chordata
- Class: Actinopterygii
- Order: Labriformes
- Family: Labridae
- Genus: Chlorurus
- Species: C. strongylocephalus

Binomial name
- Chlorurus strongylocephalus (Bleeker, 1855)

Synonyms
- Scarus strongylocephalus Bleeker, 1855; Callyodon strongylocephalus (Bleeker, 1855)

= Chlorurus strongylocephalus =

Species of ray-finned fishes

Chlorurus strongylocephalus, commonly known as the steephead parrotfish, is a species of marine ray-finned fish, a parrotfish from the family Scaridae which is native to the Indian Ocean, where it lives in coral reefs. Its range extends from the Gulf of Aden and Socotra down the coast of East Africa as far south as Mozambique and across the Indian Ocean to western Indonesia. The species forms a species complex with Chlorurus gibbus of the Red Sea and Chlorurus microrhinos of the west-central Pacific.

== Gallery ==
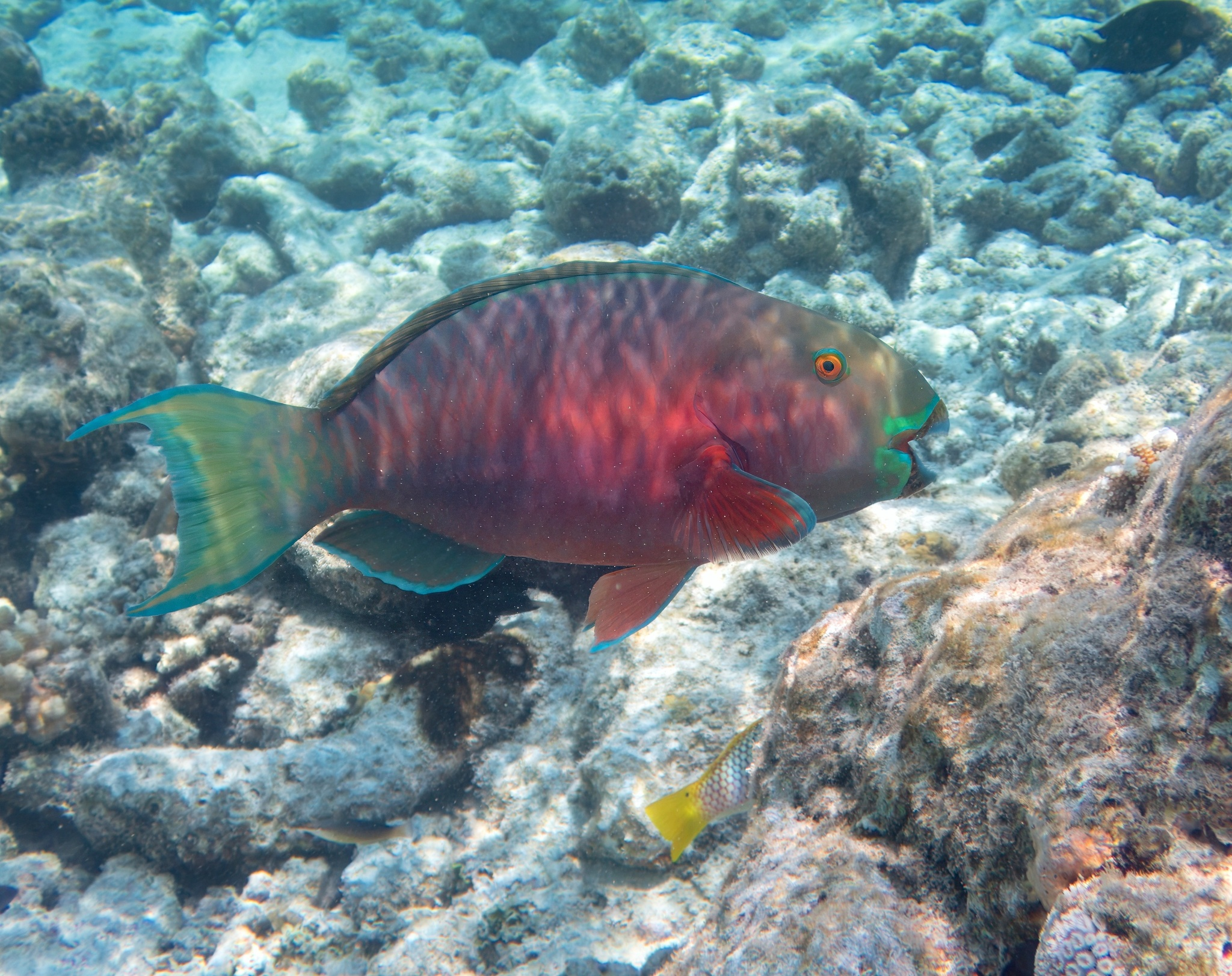
Initial phase, in the Maldives

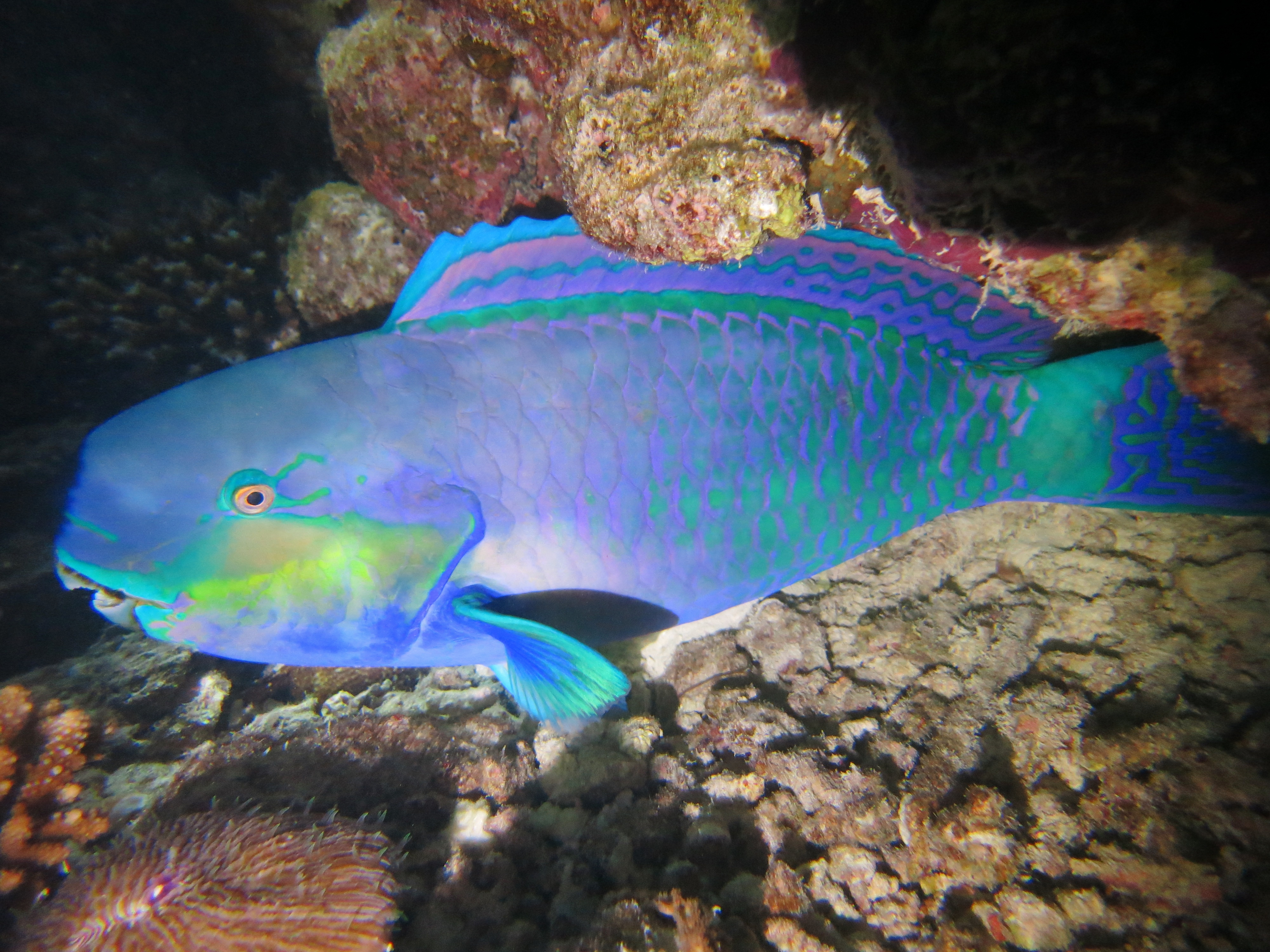
Terminal phase, in the Maldives

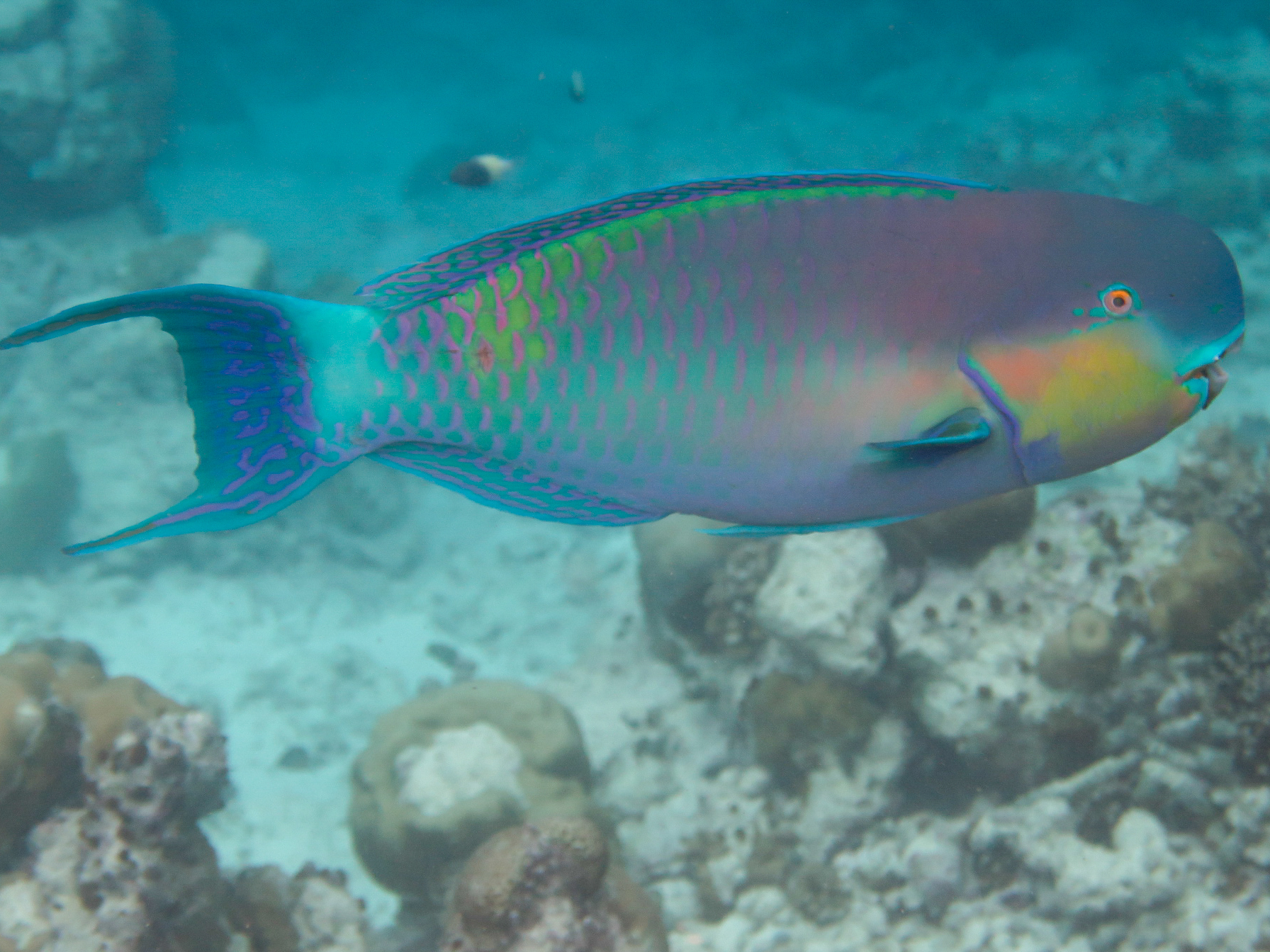
Terminal phase, in the Maldives

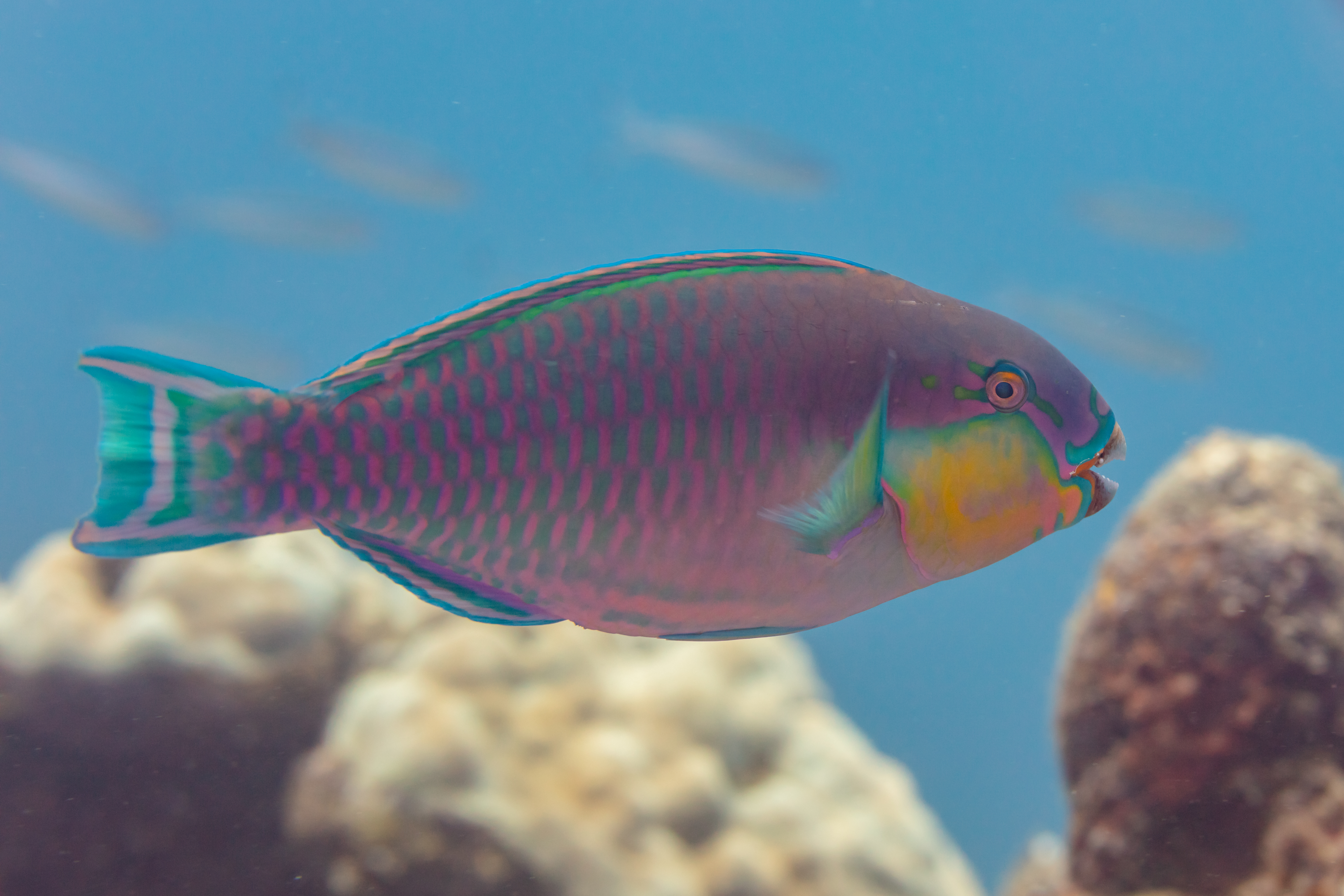
Terminal phase, in Madagascar
