= Biopitting =

Biopitting is a geologic phenomenon that occurs when small pits are created in rock as a result of the bioerosion induced by different organisms and/or microorganisms (for example, fungi, bacteria, algae, lichens). This phenomenon occurs when the organisms grow on or near the surface of rocks.

== Etymology ==
The terms biopit and biopitting were introduced in 1981 to describe biologically induced decay phenomena. The terms have since been adopted by other authors to describe similar occurrences.

== Physical Process ==
Biopits are classified according to origin, shape (irregular, circular, ovoid), surface size (3 mm to 15 mm), and depth (range 1 to 5 mm).

Biopit formation by fungal organisms occurs via active penetration of the rock without previous activity by other organisms or physicochemical decay. The resulting bioerosion process occurs in several stages.

1. Prepenetration stage – The fungal cells reach the substratum, where appressoria (organs of attachment and absorption) are developed.
2. Penetration stage – Thin hyphae extend from the fungal organisms into the inner part of the rock.
3. Postpenetration stage – The penetration hyphae follow the fissures and cavities of the rock to reach internal hollows and cavities. At this stage, new colonies start to develop during what is referred to as the postpenetration stage. Subsequently, the internal colonies expand to much larger sizes than the superficially visible colonies.

Following the initial invasive attachment and growth, biomass increase and turgor pressure from the expanding hyphae can promote the loosening of rock crystals, which will eventually fall off of the main rock formation. These events occur in a progressive fashion, creating continuous cycles of penetration-decohesion-material loss and eventually leading to the appearance of multiple pits in the rock surface.

Since different organisms grow at varied rates, and in an assortment of growth patterns, the type and shape of the resulting biopits often corresponds to the fungal taxa present in the rock.
