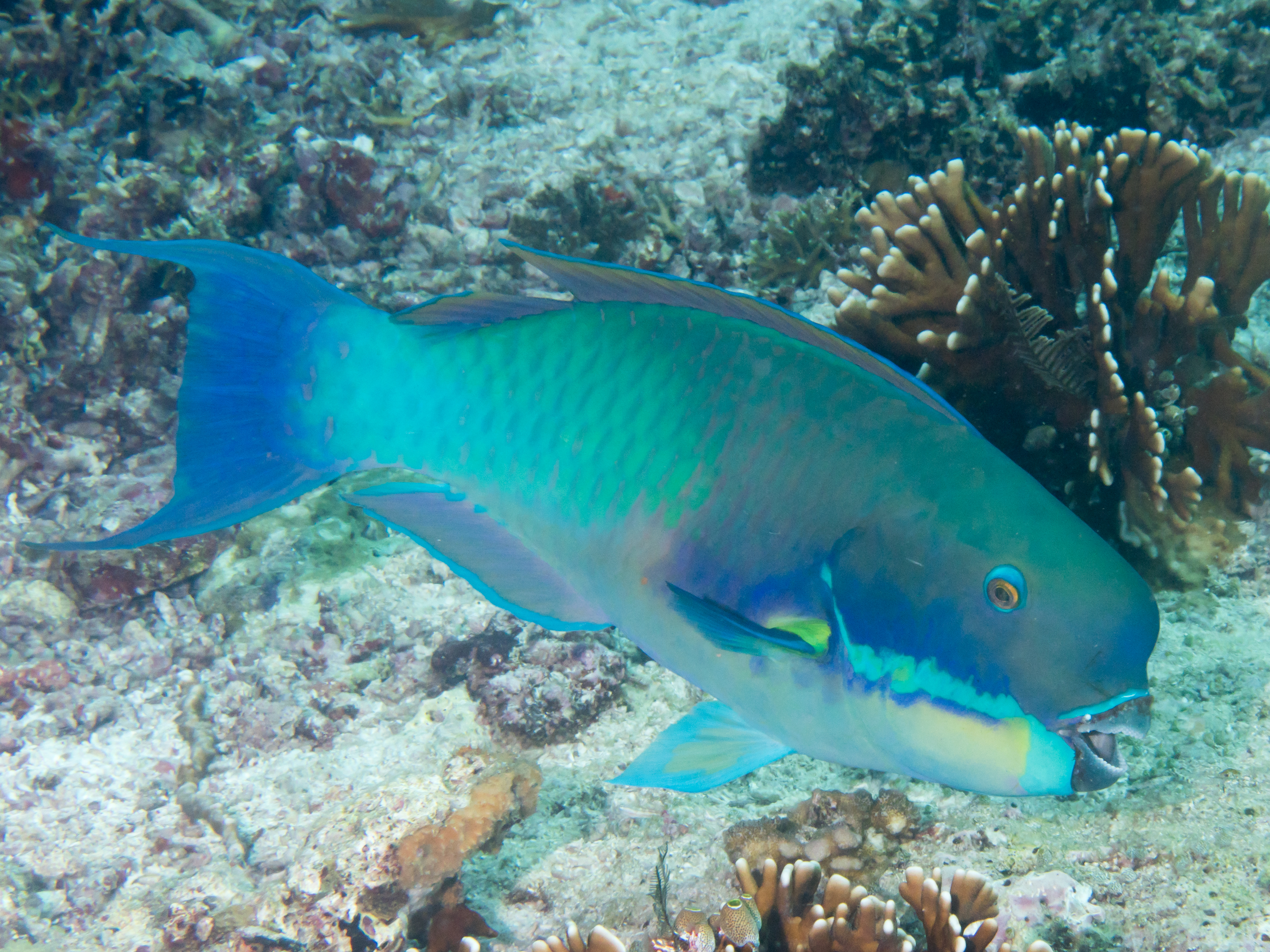
- Terminal phase in Indonesia
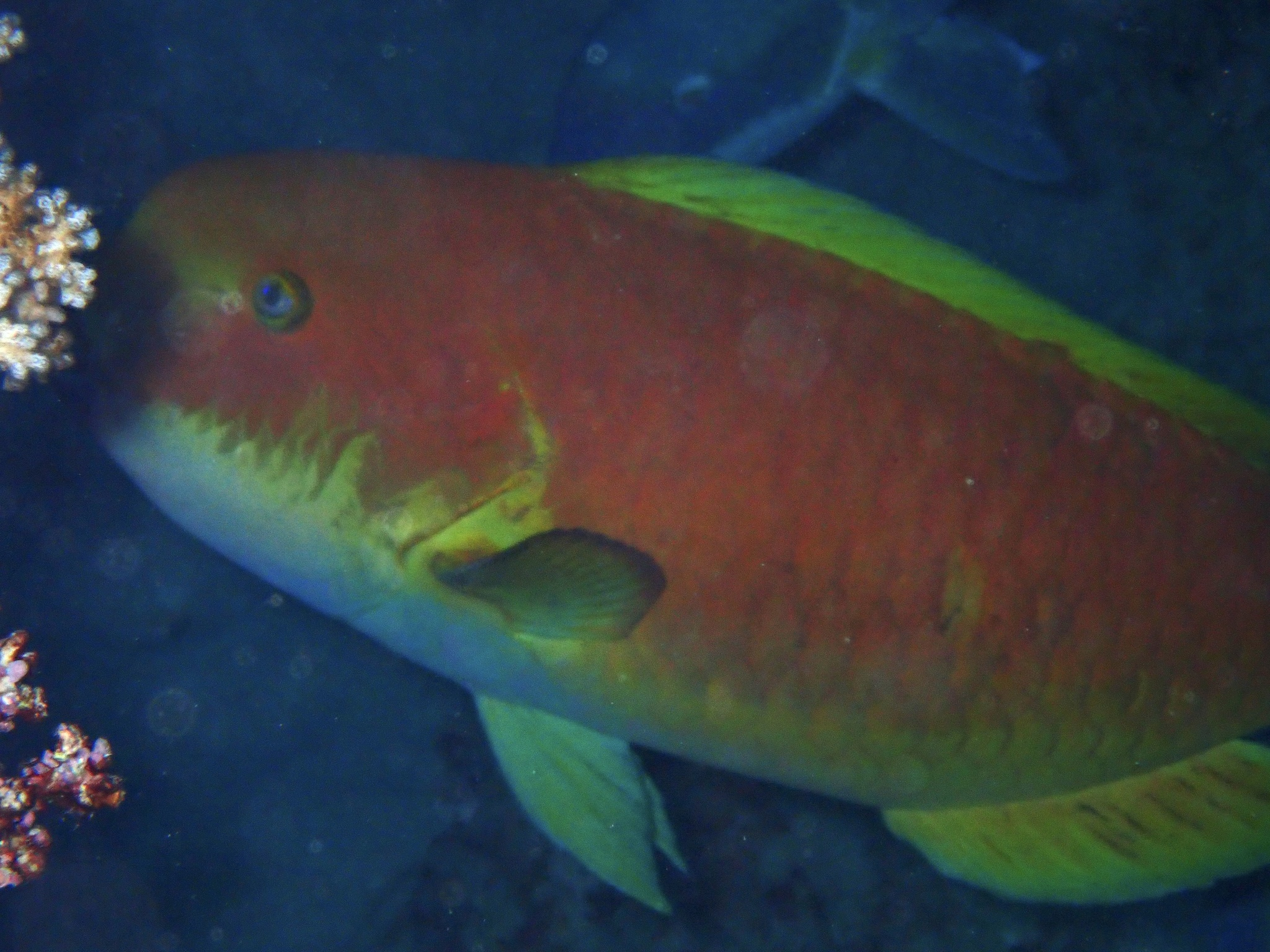
- Initial phase, in Queensland

Conservation status
- Least Concern (IUCN 3.1)

Scientific classification
- Kingdom: Animalia
- Phylum: Chordata
- Class: Actinopterygii
- Division: Teleostei
- Order: Labriformes
- Family: Labridae
- Genus: Chlorurus
- Species: C. microrhinos

Binomial name
- Chlorurus microrhinos (Bleeker, 1854)

Synonyms
- Callyodon microrhinus (Bleeker, 1854); Callyodon ultramarinus Jordan & Seale, 1906; Pseudoscarus microrhinos (Bleeker, 1854); Scarus microrhinos Bleeker, 1854

= Chlorurus microrhinos =

Species of ray-finned fishes

Chlorurus microrhinos, commonly known as the blunt-head parrotfish or steephead parrotfish, is a species of marine ray-finned fish, a parrotfish from the family Scaridae. It is found in the Indo-Pacific region.

== Taxonomy ==
Chlorurus microrhinos was first formally described as Scarus microrhinos in 1854 by the Dutch medical doctor, ichthyologist, and herpetologist Pieter Bleeker (1819–1878), with the type locality given as Jakarta. It forms a species complex with Chlorurus gibbus in the Red Sea and Chlorurus strongylocephalus in the Indian Ocean.

== Distribution ==
This species is one of the most widespread. It is present in the extreme east Indian Ocean and the Pacific Ocean, from the Ryukyu and Ogasawara Islands to Indonesia and the Australian Great Barrier Reef, Lord Howe Island, New Caledonia, and French Polynesia, and eastwards to Oceania (Hawaii and Easter Island excluded).

== Description ==
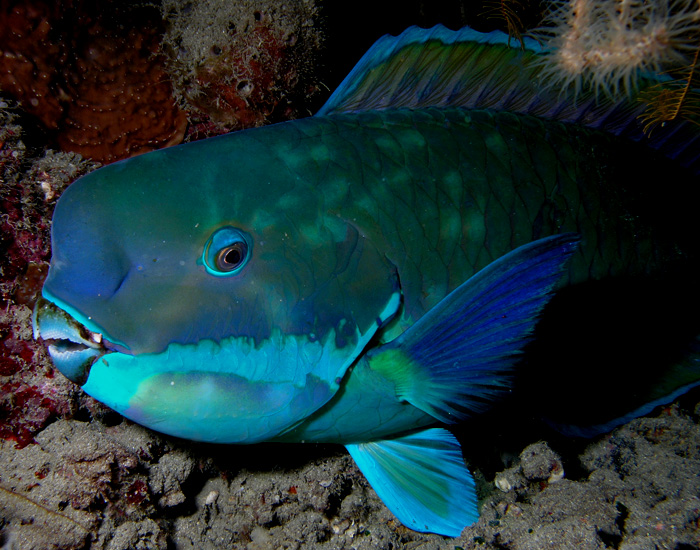
Close-up of head

Chlorurus microrhinos usually grows to be about 80 centimetres (31 in) long. These parrotfish are greenish blue, with a brilliant blue band behind the corner of the mouth and a wide blue patch along the head. Rarely, some individuals may be uniformly yellowish-tan. The cheek is crossed by an irregular line, below which the colour is usually greenish-yellow. Larger fishes are uniformly dark, greenish brown, turning greenish blue only with age, but they do not undergo as radical a colour change with growth as do other scarids.

They have nine dorsal spines, 10 dorsal soft rays, 3 anal spines, and 9 anal soft rays. The tail is crescent-shaped in large terminal males, while in juveniles it is rounded. Adults show large exposed blue-green tooth plates, with one or two canines on each side of the upper plate.

Large males develop a prominent forehead (hence the common name of blunt-head parrotfishes). Juveniles are black with some horizontal white stripes.

Some geographic variation exists between Red Sea, Western Indian Ocean, and Pacific populations, and an unusual reddish-tan phase occurs in the central Pacific.

== Habitat and biology ==
Chlorurus microrhinos can be found in many different habitats, including lagoons, inshore reefs, and ocean reef fronts, from 2 to 50 m. At Guam, large individuals are seldom seen in shallow water. This species occurs in schools that forage over lagoons and seaward reefs, which are rich in algae growth. The graze on filamentous algae. This large species of parrotfish has an important ecological role in coral reefs because, as they graze, they excavate the coral to feed on algae. It grows quickly and can attain an age of 15 years old. These parrotfish mainly feed on benthic algae and material scraped from corals, leaving exposed reef substrate. They usually swim in schools of about 40 fish, although juveniles are generally solitary. The flesh of the adults may be slightly toxic at some Pacific localities.

== Gallery ==
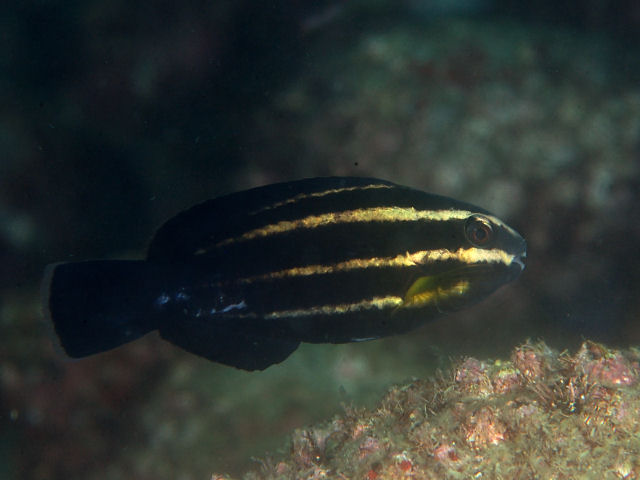
Juvenile

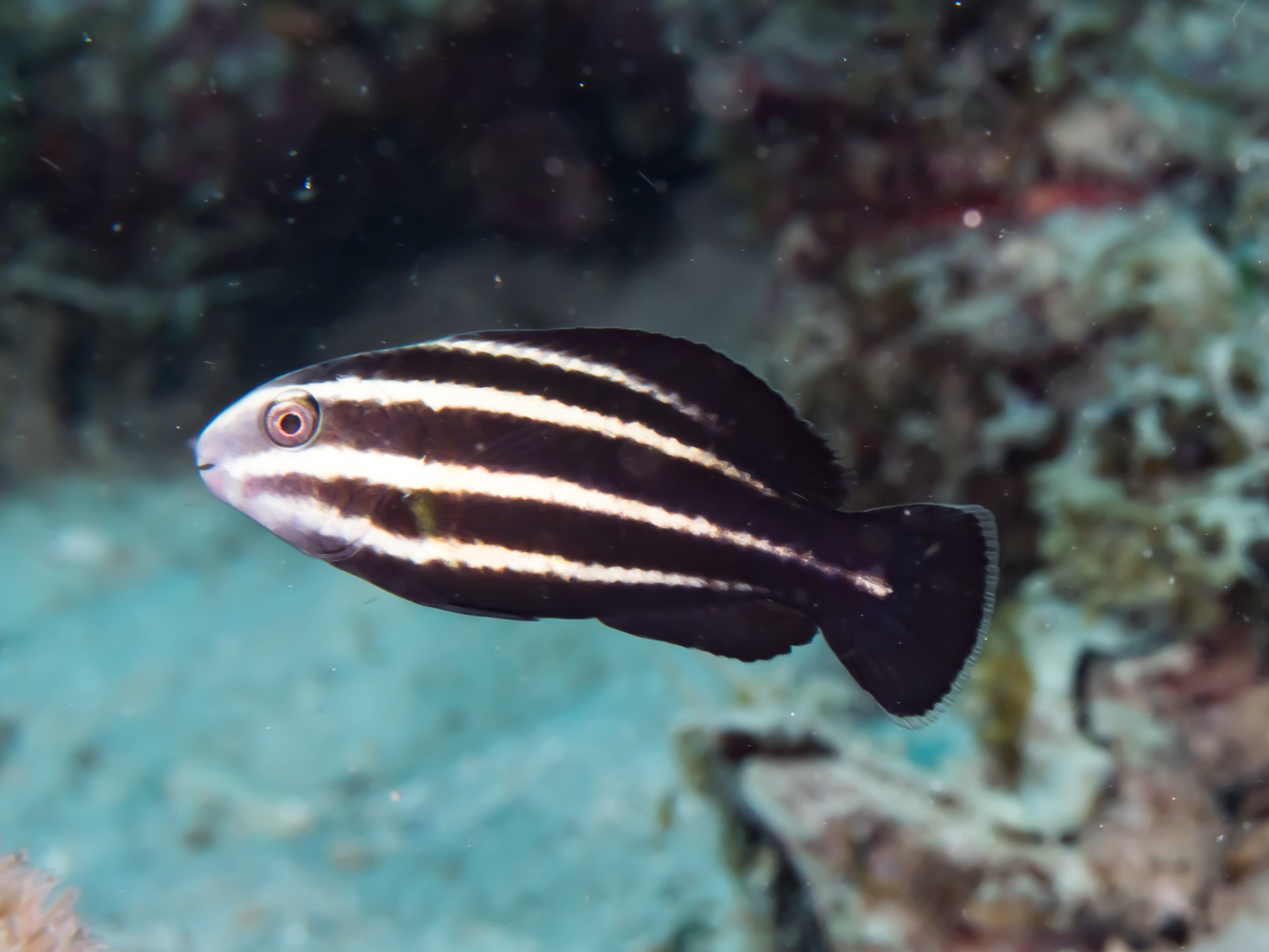
Juvenile

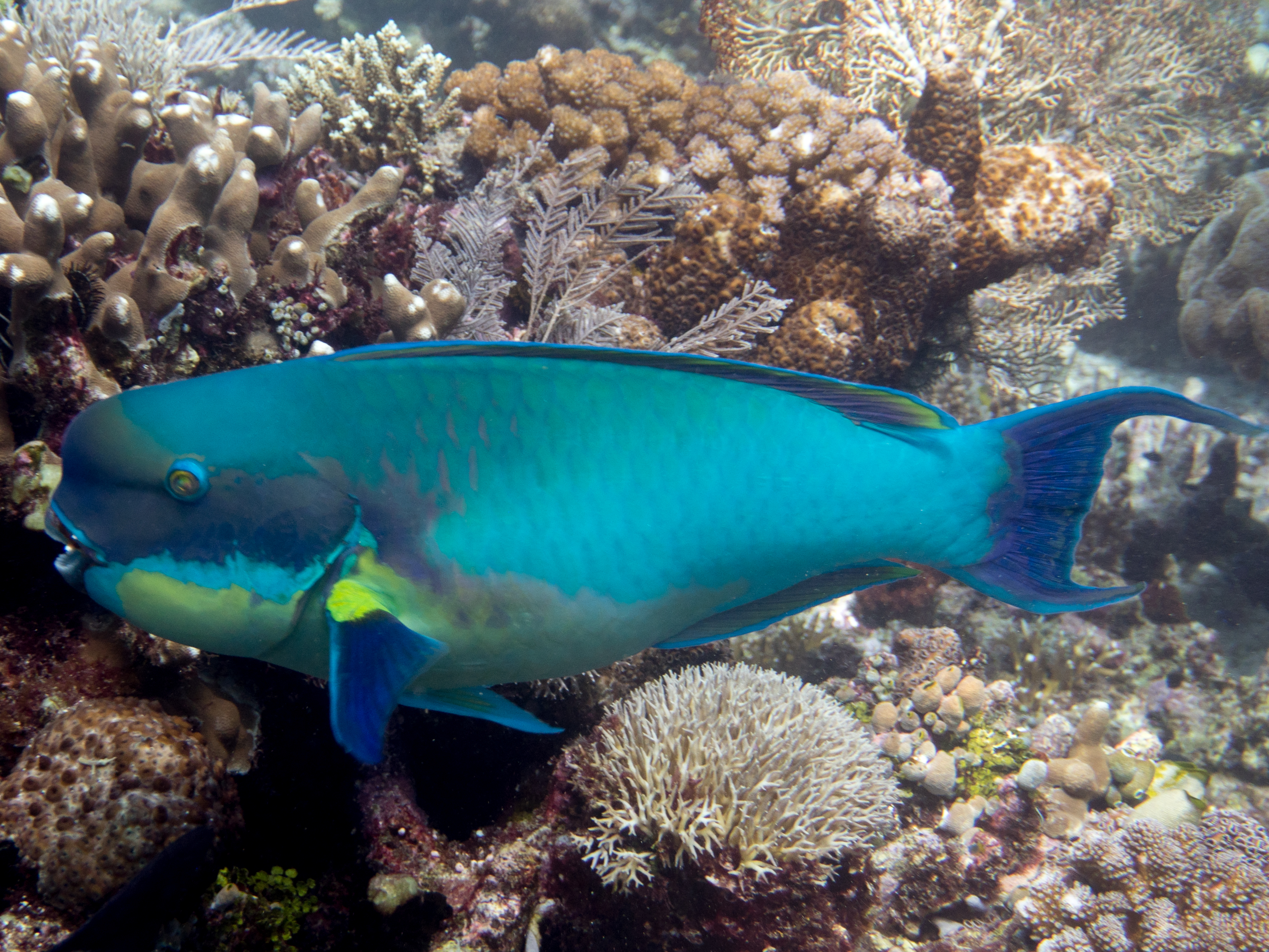
Adult

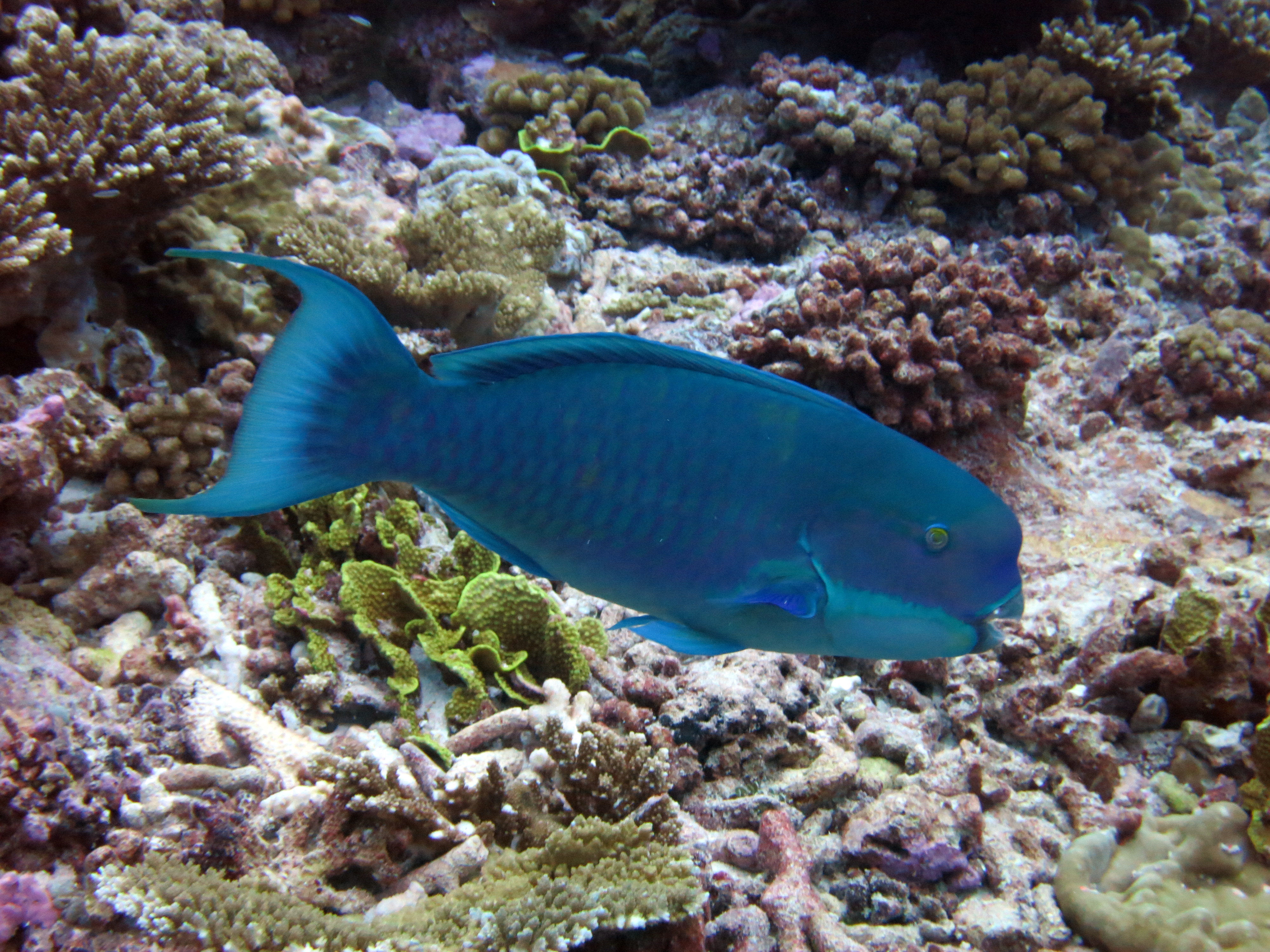
At Kingman Reef

== Bibliography ==
- Bellwood, D.R. 2001: Family Scaridae. A: Carpenter & Niem 2001. Species identification guide for fishery purposes. Bony fishes part 4. 6: 3468–3492, Pls. VI-XIV.
- Bleeker, P. 1854: Speciés piscium bataviensium novae vel minus cognitae. Natuurkundig Tijdschrift voor Nederlandsch Indië, 6: 191–202.
- Helfman, G., B. Collette i D. Facey: The diversity of fishes. Blackwell Science, Malden, Massachusetts (USA), 1997.
- Moyle, P. i J. Cech.: Fishes: An Introduction to Ichthyology, 4a edició, Upper Saddle River (Nova Jersey, Estats Units): Prentice-Hall..
- Nelson, J.: Fishes of the World, 3rd ed.. New York: John Wiley and Sons.
- Parenti, P. I J.E. Randall. An annotated checklist of the species of the labroid fish families Labridae and Scaridae. Ichthyol. Bull. J. L. B. Smith Inst. Ichthyol. (68):1–97.
- Randall, J.E., 1986. Scaridae. p. 706–714. A M.M. Smith i P.C. Heemstra (eds.) Smiths' sea fishes. Springer-Verlag.
- Wheeler, A.: The World Encyclopedia of Fishes, 2nd ed.: Macdonald.
