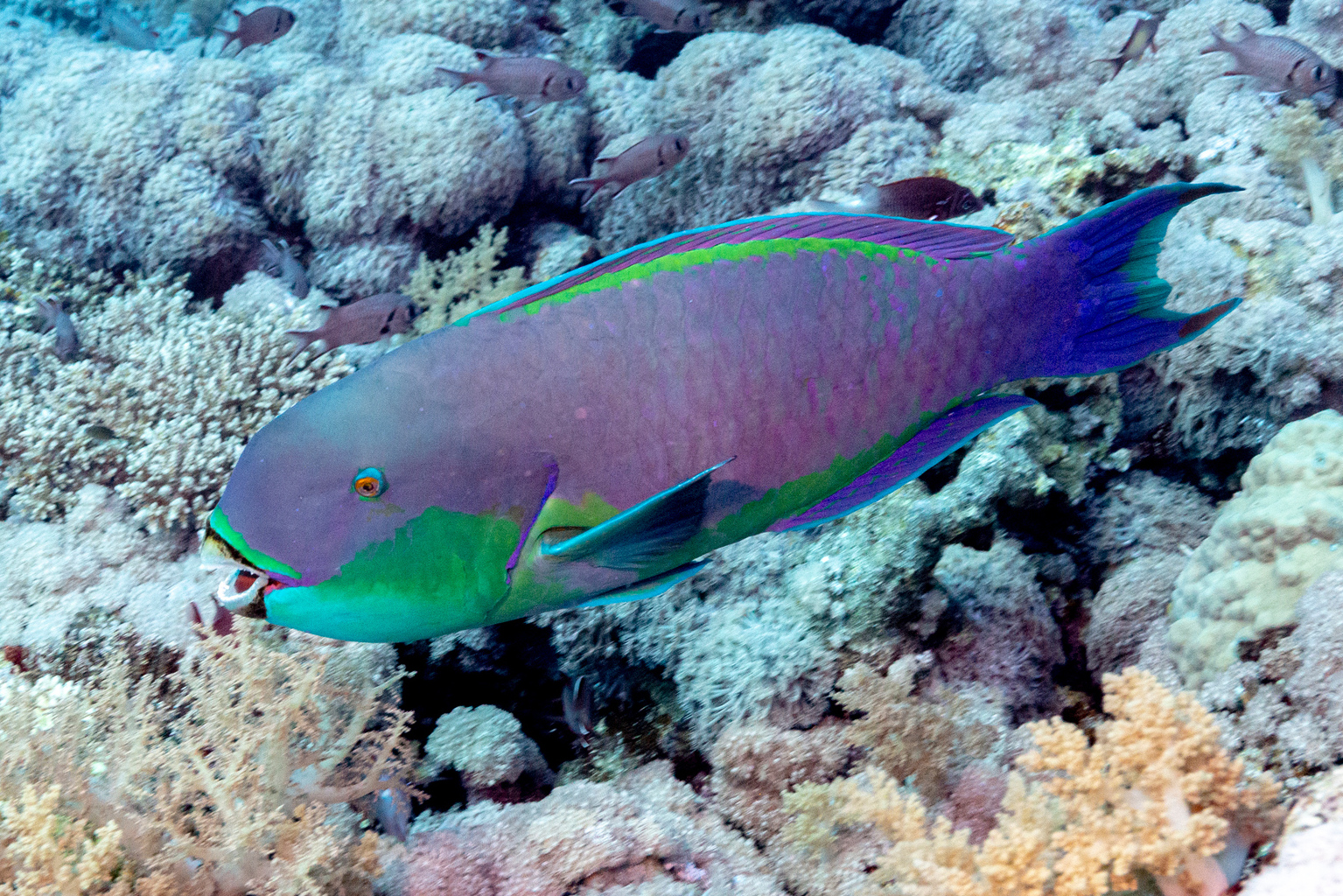
- Male
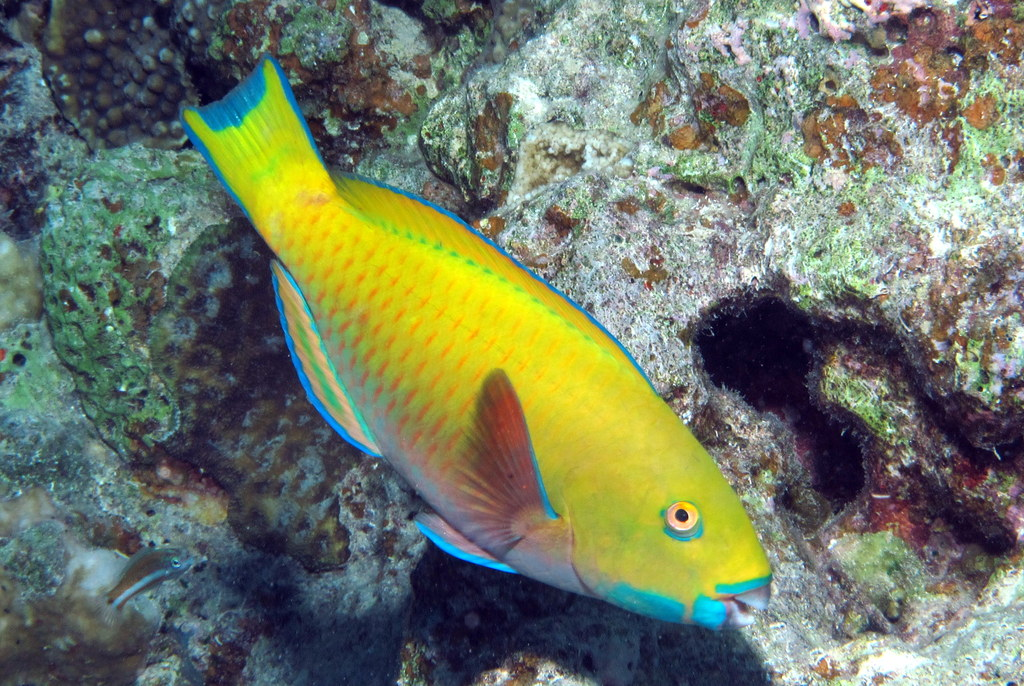
- Female

Conservation status
- Least Concern (IUCN 3.1)

Scientific classification
- Kingdom: Animalia
- Phylum: Chordata
- Class: Actinopterygii
- Order: Labriformes
- Family: Labridae
- Genus: Chlorurus
- Species: C. gibbus

Binomial name
- Chlorurus gibbus (Rüppell, 1829)

Synonyms
- Scarus gibbus Rüppell, 1829

= Chlorurus gibbus =

Species of ray-finned fishes

Chlorurus gibbus, commonly known as the heavybeak parrotfish, gibbus parrotfish or Red Sea steephead parrotfish, is a species of marine ray-finned fish, a parrotfish from the family Scaridae. It is found in the Red Sea.

== Taxonomy ==
Chlorurus gibbus was first formally described as Scarus gibbus in 1829 by the German naturalist and explorer Eduard Rüppell (1794–1884), the type locality was given as Al Muwaylih, Tabuk Province in Saudi Arabia. When William Swainson created the genus Chlorurus in 1839 he designated Scarus gibbus is its type species.

C. gibbus along with C. strongylocephalus in the Indian Ocean and C. microrhinos in the west-central Pacific form a species complex.

== Distribution ==
Chlorurus gibbus is endemic to the Red Sea and the Gulf of Aqaba. It has not been recorded in the Gulf of Aden where the closely related species Chlorurus strongylocephalus has been recorded. A report of C. gibbus from Socotra requires verification.

== Description ==
Chlorurus gibbus is a large species of parrotfish which can attain a total length of 70 centimetres (28 in) and a weight of 2.2 kilograms (4.9 lb). The solitary juveniles are marked with longitudinal black and white stripes, the adults are blue in colour with a green and purple sheen in the males and a yellow sheen in the females.

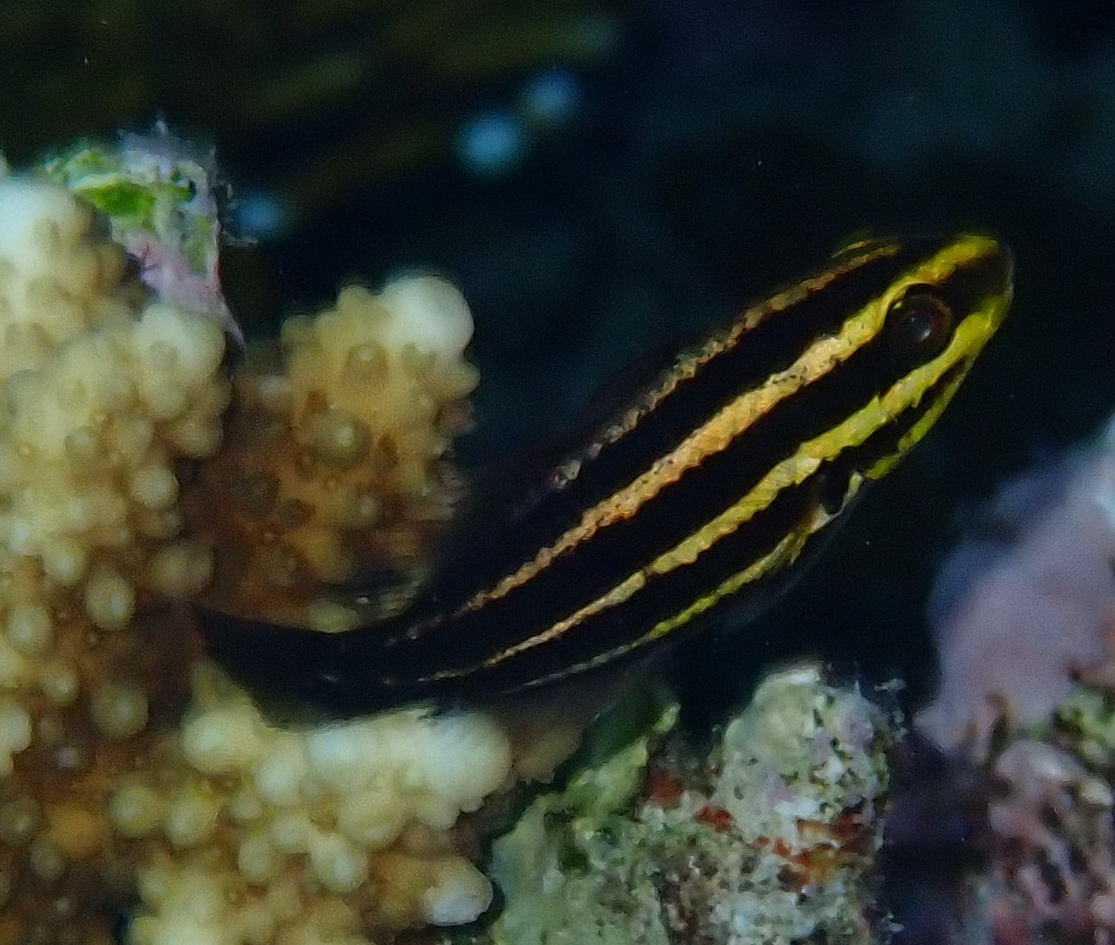
Juvenile

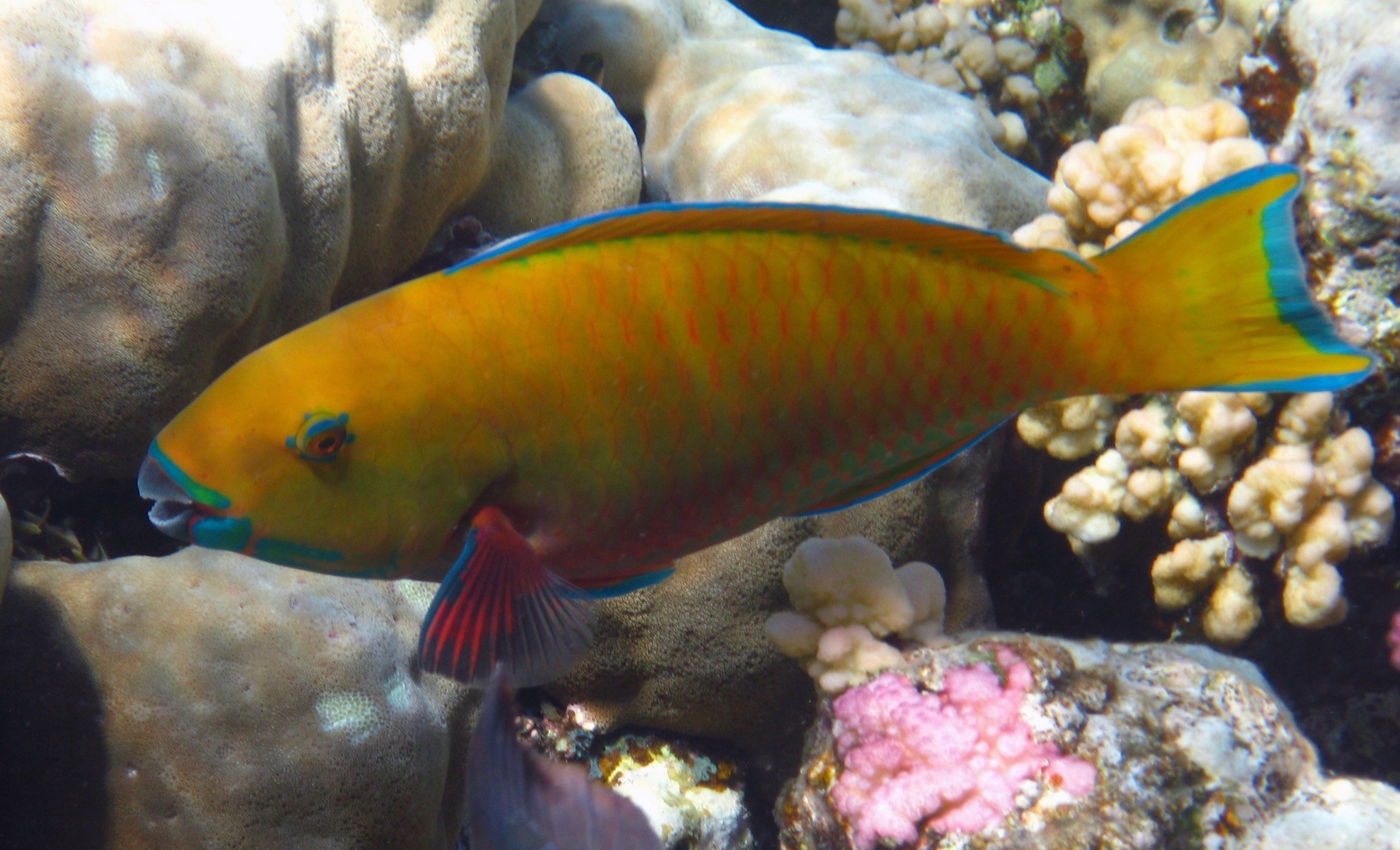
Female

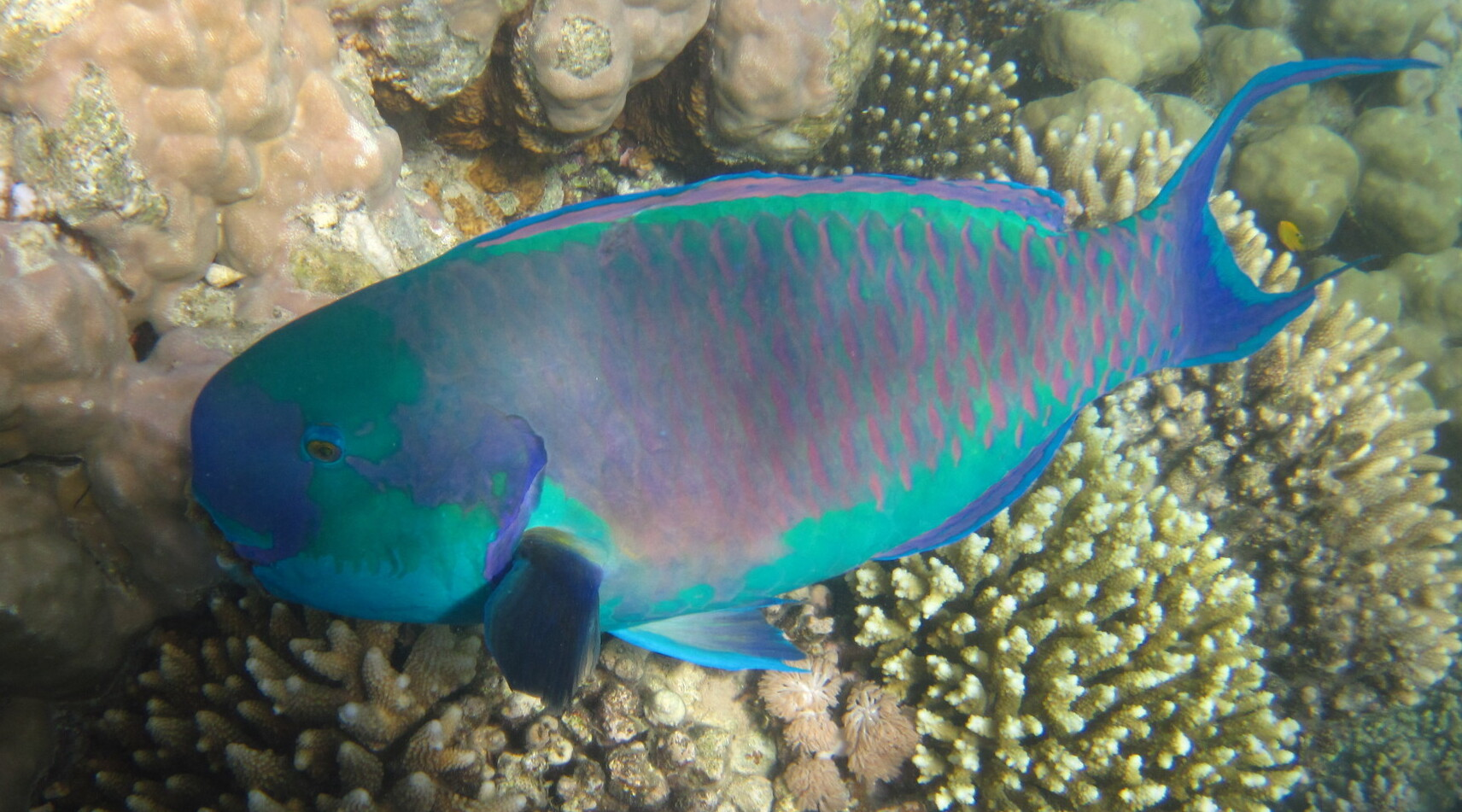
Male

== Habitat and biology ==
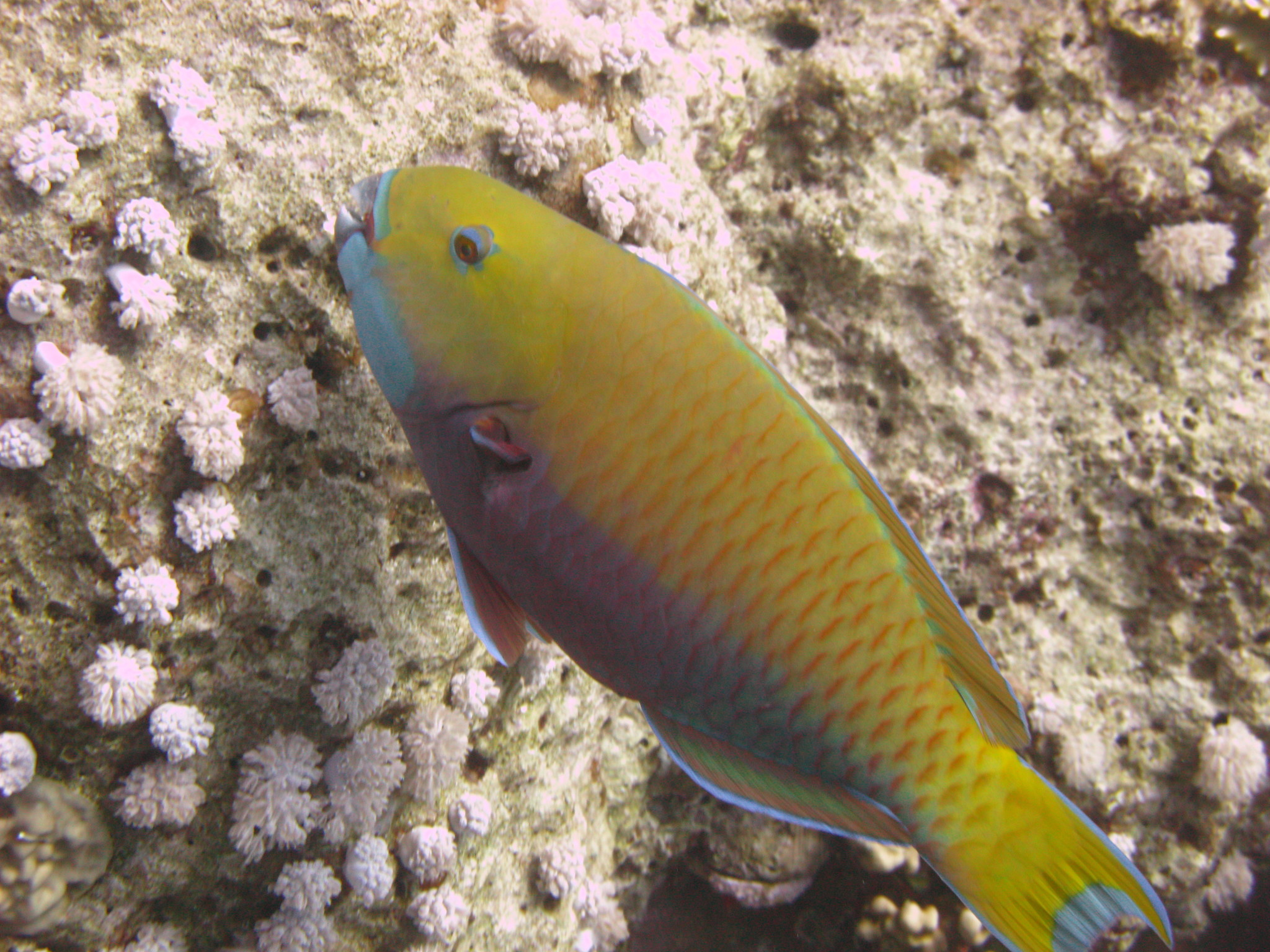
Female

Chlorurus gibbus occurs in shallow reefs and in nearby areas of sandy substrate in lagoons and bays at depths between 2–30 metres (6.6–98.4 ft). The adults school over the outer reef where there is an abundant growth of algae. They graze on filamentous algae. They have been recorded as attaining 14 years of age. They are protogynous hermaphrodites and have a social structure consisting of harems with a single dominant male. However, they are not territorial and will live and feed alongside peaceably with other species. The teeth of parrotfish are fused together to form a powerful beak which they use to graze on filamentous algae growing on dead coral, often found feeding among a cloud of sediment. They are oviparous and the male and female form a pair to spawn. During the night they create a bag from mucus and bubbles which provides protection from nocturnal predators.

== Relationship with humans ==
Chlorurus gibbus is fished in the central Red Sea, in the Jeddah fish market it was shown to be a significant part of the parrotfish catch.
