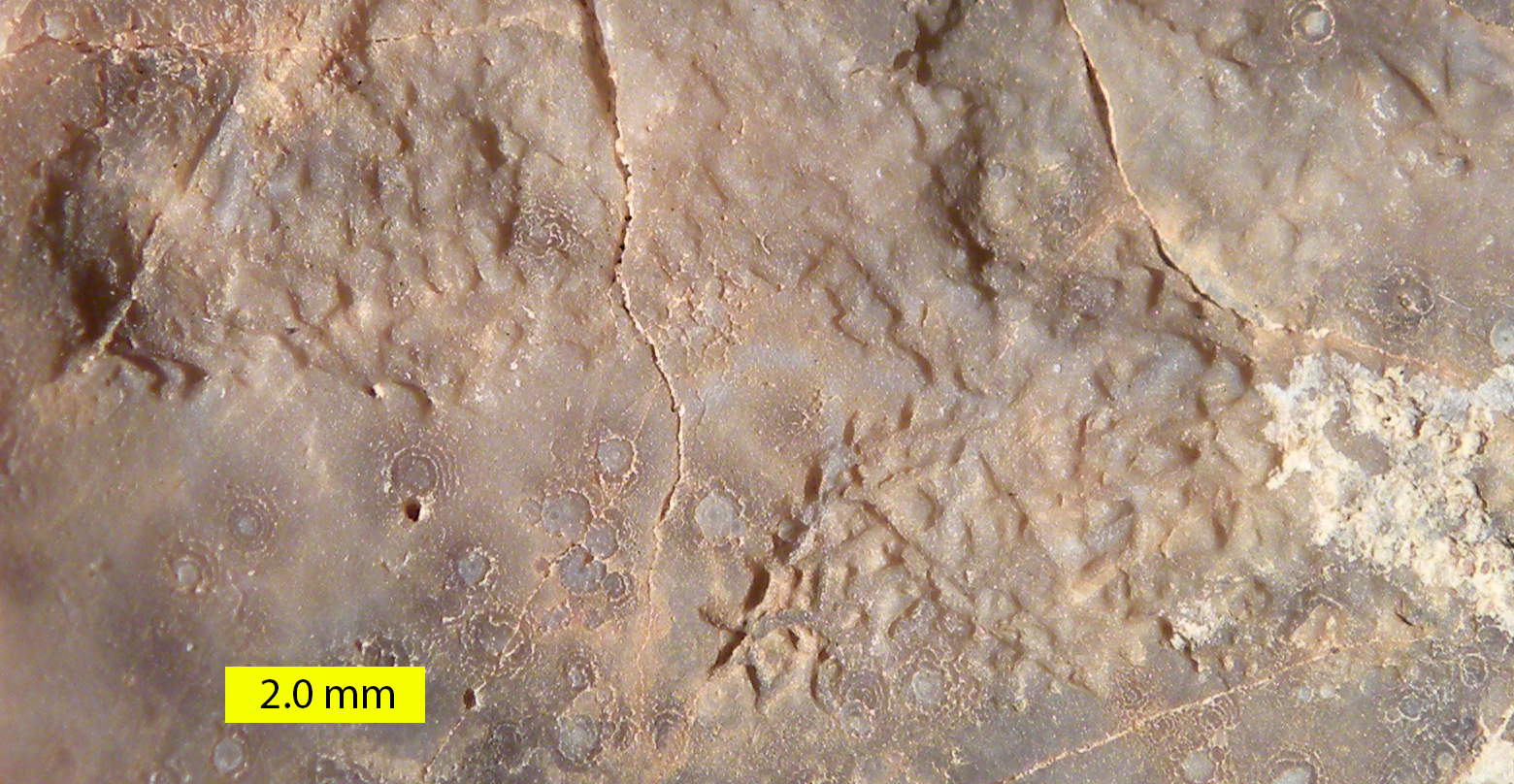
- Gnathichnus pentax echinoid trace fossil on an oyster from the Cenomanian of Hamakhtesh Hagadol, southern Israel.

Trace fossil classification
- Ichnofamily: †Gnathichnidae
- Ichnogenus: †Gnathichnus; Bromley, 1975

Type ichnospecies
- Gnathichnus pentax Bromley, 1975

Synonyms
- Roderosignus Michalík, 1977; Asteriastoma Breton, 1992

= Gnathichnus =

Trace fossil

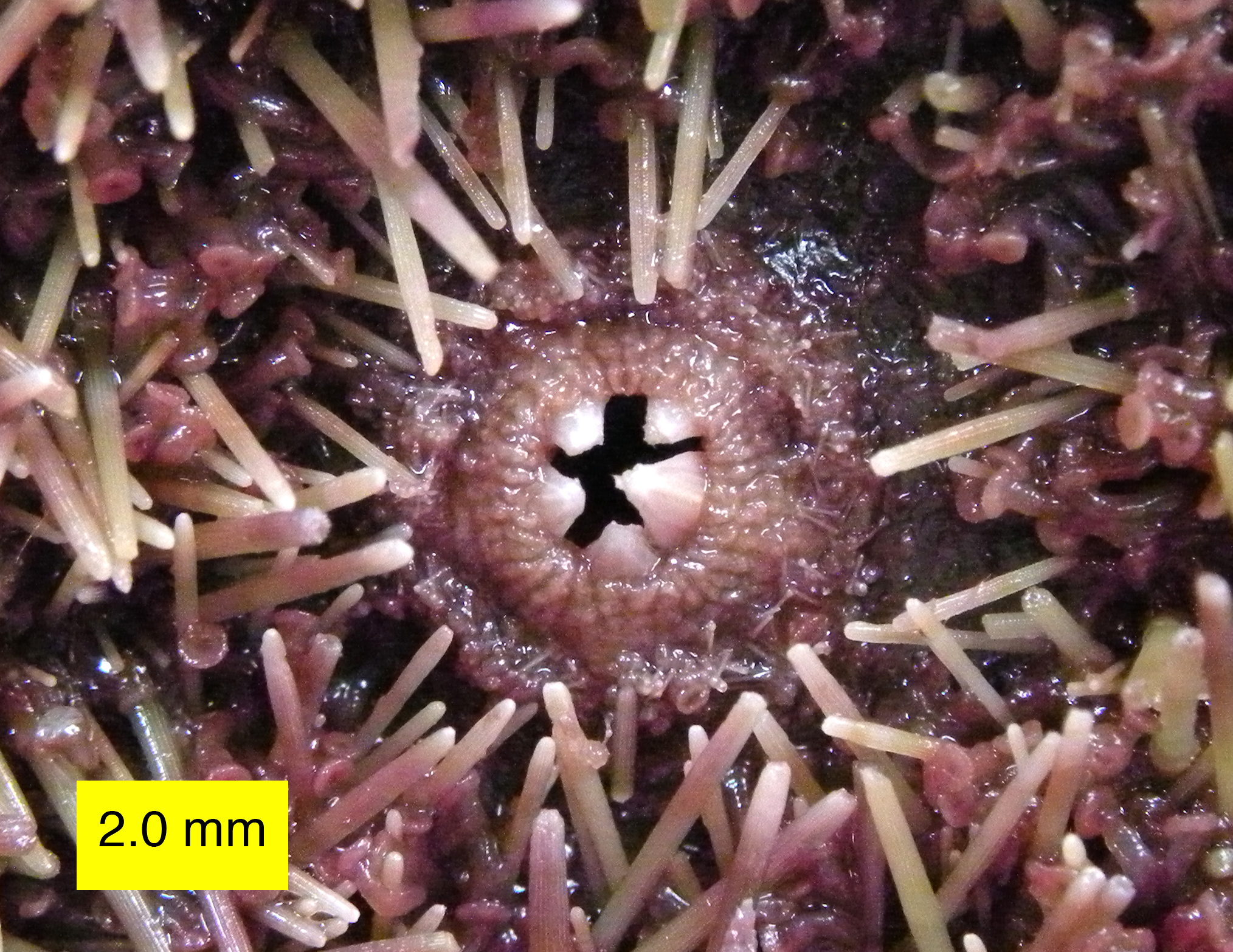
Oral surface of Strongylocentrotus purpuratus showing the teeth of the Aristotle's Lantern, which can make the trace Gnathichnus.

Gnathichnus is a trace fossil on a hard substrate (typically a shell, rock or hardground made of calcium carbonate) formed by regular echinoids as they scraped the surface with their five-toothed Aristotle's Lantern feeding structures.
