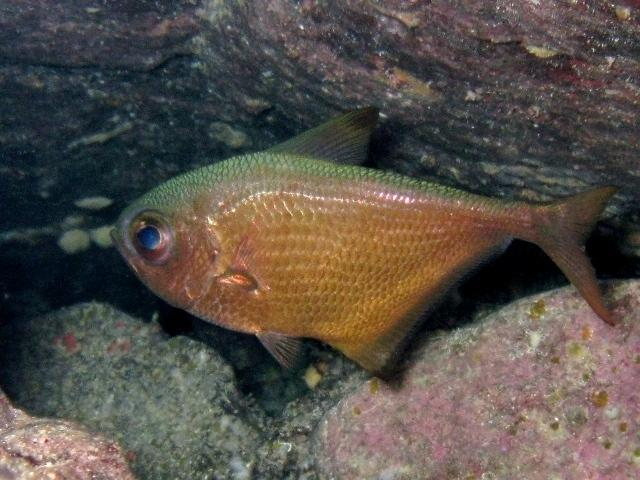

Scientific classification
- Kingdom: Animalia
- Phylum: Chordata
- Class: Actinopterygii
- Order: Acropomatiformes
- Family: Pempheridae
- Genus: Pempheris
- Species: P. mangula

Binomial name
- Pempheris mangula Cuvier, 1829

Synonyms
- Pempheris rhomboidea Kossmann & Räuber, 1877; Pempheris erythraea Kossmann & Räuber, 1877; Pempheris russellii Day, 1888

= Pempheris mangula =

Species of fish

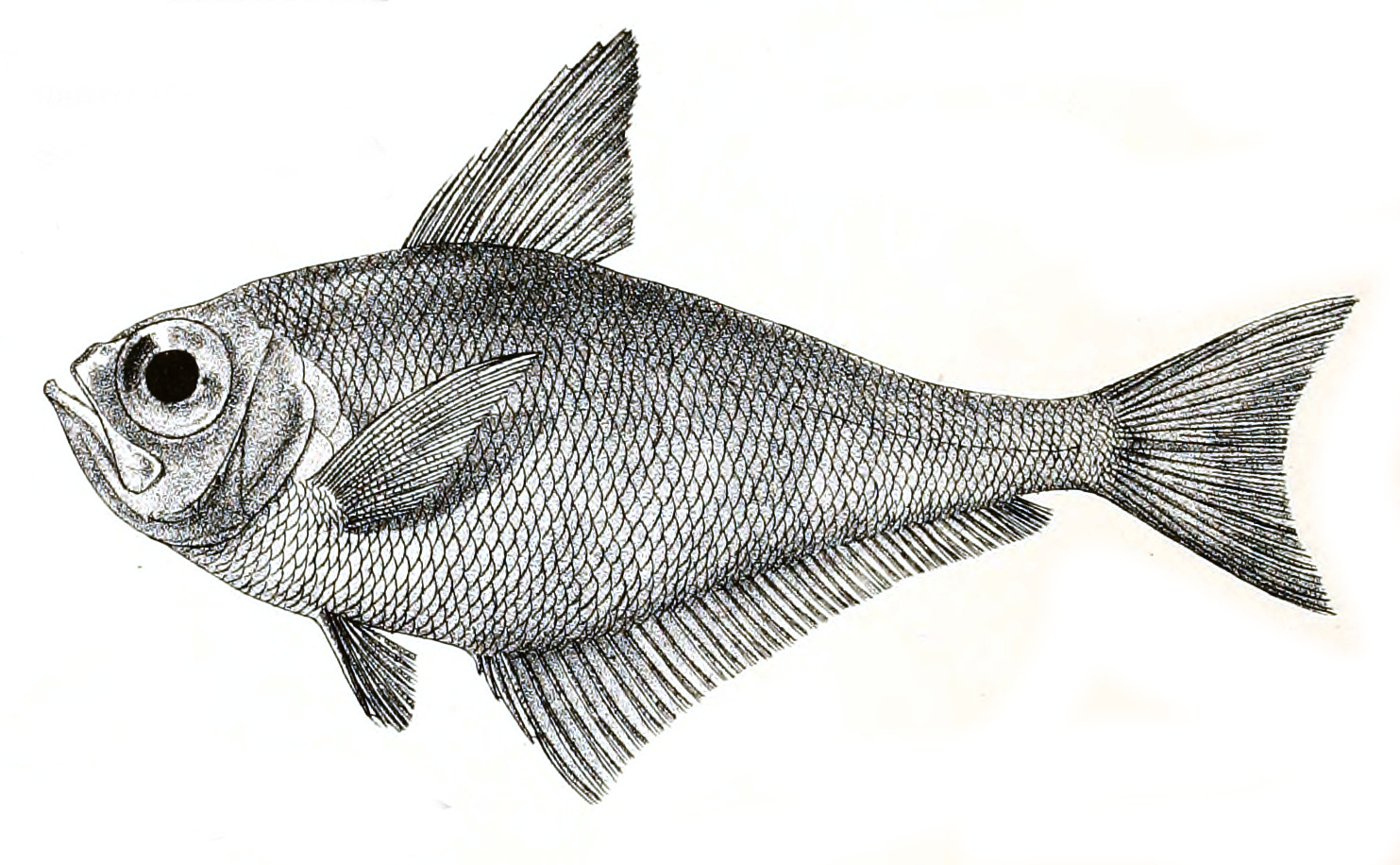
Pempheris mangula Ford 42

Pempheris mangula, the black-edged sweeper, Moluccan sweeper or black-margin bullseye is a species of Indo-Pacific sweeper from the family Pempheridae. The history of the identification of the Indo-Pacific sweepers is complex and this species has been identified as the "Pempheris vanicolensis" which has colonised the Mediterranean Sea from the Red Sea via the Suez Canal by Lessepsian migration but this identification is not universally accepted.

== Description ==
Pempheris mangula has a lateral line consisting of 49-60 pored scales with 4.5-5.5 scale rows above lateral line; 14–18, normally 16, scales around the caudal peduncle. Only the tip of the dorsal fin is blackish. The very large eye has a diameter which is equal to 13.0-15.3% of the standard length and 43.6-51.5% of the head length. The deep body is 44.6-49.1% of the standard length in depth. The flans are usually marked with irregular faint longitudinal light stripes. It also has 6 spines and 9-10 soft rays in the dorsal fin while the anal fin has 3 spines and 34-42 soft rays. It has a count of 25 vertebrae.

== Distribution ==
Pempheris mangula has been said to have a wide Indo-Pacific distribution from the eastern coast of Africa and Madagascar to the north western coast of Australia as far south as New South Wales, but being absent from the South China Sea and the Malay Archipelago. It is also been claimed to be the species of sweeper which has colonised the eastern Mediterranean from the Red Sea via the Suez Canal but see Taxonomy section below. In the Mediterranean it was first recorded in 1979 off Lebanon. It has reached as far as the coast of Libya and the Aegean Sea.

== Biology ==
Pempheris mangula is normally a solitary species which spends the day in caves or under overhangs in coral reefs. It is a nocturnal species which feeds on zooplankton in open waters at night. The spawning season of this species is shorter in the Mediterranean, where it lasts from April to September, whereas spawning is year round in the Red Sea. They prey mainly on the larval and adult stages of planktonic crustaceans. They depart from their daytime shelters at dusk and congregate nearby before moving inshore where they disperse into small groups to feed. Prior to sunrise, they reassemble near the entrance to their shelter, so they can go in it at first light, once the school has sufficient numbers.

== Taxonomy ==
There is some debate around the true limits of Pempheris mangula and originally the sweepers which were identified as Lessepsian migrants in the Mediterranean Sea were identified as P. vanicolensis but then it was proposed that that species does not occur in the Red Sea, P. mangula was then stated to be the Red Sea species which had colonised the Mediterranean. Other workers have stated that P. mangula is an eastern Indian Ocean species, found no further west than the east coast of India and that the Red Sea members of the genus Pempheris are P. flavicycla, P. rhomboidea and P. tominagai, and that the Mediterranean invader is P. rhomboidea. Fishbase still treats P. rhomboidea as a synonym of P. mangula.
