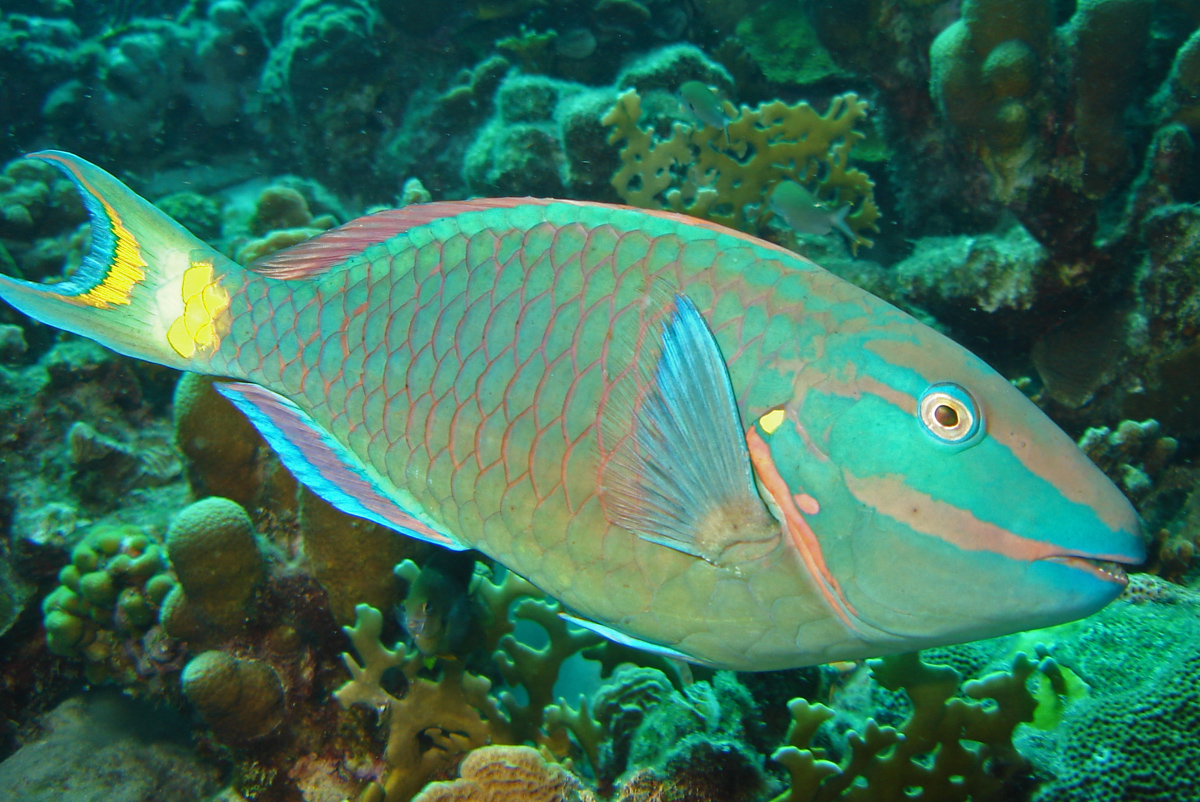
- Male S. viride

Scientific classification
- Kingdom: Animalia
- Phylum: Chordata
- Class: Actinopterygii
- Order: Labriformes
- Family: Labridae
- Tribe: Sparisomatini
- Genus: Sparisoma; Swainson, 1839

Type species
- Scarus abildgaardi Bloch, 1791

Species
- See text.

Synonyms
- Callyodontichthys Bleeker, 1861; Euscarus Jordan & Evermann, 1896

= Sparisoma =

Genus of ray-finned fishes

Sparisoma is a genus of parrotfishes native to warmer parts of the Atlantic. FishBase recognizes 15 species in this genus, including S. rocha described from Trindade Island in 2010 and S. choati described from the East Atlantic in 2012. They are the most important grazers of algae in the Caribbean Sea, especially since sea urchins, especially Diadema, the other prominent consumers of algae, have been reduced in many places by a recent epidemic.

The name was proposed by William Swainson as a subgenus of Scarus. Sparus in Latin is a golden-headed fish, and soma means "body". The common spelling Sparisomus is incorrect.

== Taxonomy ==
William Swainson described the genus Sparisoma in 1839 and he designated Sparus abildgaardi as its type species, Although the specific name abildgaardi would appear to have precedence over chrysopterum, the latter is the more widely used name and the former was long mistakenly thought to be synonymous with Sparisoma viride. The name Sparus abildgaardi was suppressed by the International Commission on Zoological Nomenclature and Scarus chrysopterus was recognised as the type species.

== Biology ==
The size of parrotfishes of this genus ranges from the rather small-sized S. radians with a known maximum length of 20 cm (7.9 in) to the large S. viride, which reaches lengths of up to 64 cm (25 in).

Members of this genus are sequential hermaphrodites, starting as females (known as the initial phase) and then changing to males (the terminal phase). However, some males are direct-developing, and these usually resemble the initial phase. These direct-developing terminal-phase males often display different mating strategies. In most species, the terminal phase is more colourful than the initial, but a notable exception to this rule is S. cretense. They use their pectoral fins to move; the caudal fin is reserved for rapid bursts of speed.

The genus Sparisoma is fairly successful, but populations have been falling somewhat because of overfishing and other human activities. However, as mentioned above, it is the main grazer of algae. Still, since populations have been falling, the coral reefs may be at risk, because too much algae is deleterious or harmful to coral.

== Species ==
Species	Common name	Initial phase	Terminal phase
Sparisoma amplum (Ranzani, 1842)	Reef parrotfish		
Sparisoma atomarium (Poey, 1861)	Greenblotch parrotfish		
Sparisoma aurofrenatum (Valenciennes, 1840)	Redband parrotfish		
Sparisoma axillare (Steindachner, 1878)	Gray parrotfish		
Sparisoma choati Rocha, Brito & D. R. Robertson, 2012	West-African parrotfish		
Sparisoma chrysopterum (Bloch & Schneider, 1801)	Redtail parrotfish		
Sparisoma cretense (Linnaeus, 1758)	Mediterranean parrotfish		
Sparisoma frondosum (Agassiz, 1831)	Agassiz's parrotfish		
Sparisoma griseorubrum Cervigón, 1982	Caribbean reef parrotfish		
Sparisoma radians (Valenciennes, 1840)	Bucktooth parrotfish		
Sparisoma rocha Pinheiro, Gasparini & Sazima, 2010	Rocha's parrotfish		
Sparisoma rubripinne (Valenciennes, 1840)	Redfin parrotfish		
Sparisoma strigatum (Günther, 1862)	Strigate parrotfish		
Sparisoma tuiupiranga Gasparini, Joyeux & Floeter, 2003	Brazilian red parrotfish		
Sparisoma viride (Bonnaterre, 1788)	Stoplight parrotfish		

An alleged fossil otolith of Sparisoma from the Lutetian of France would represent the oldest record of this genus, and of parrotfishes in general. However, more recent studies no longer assign the fossil to this genus.
