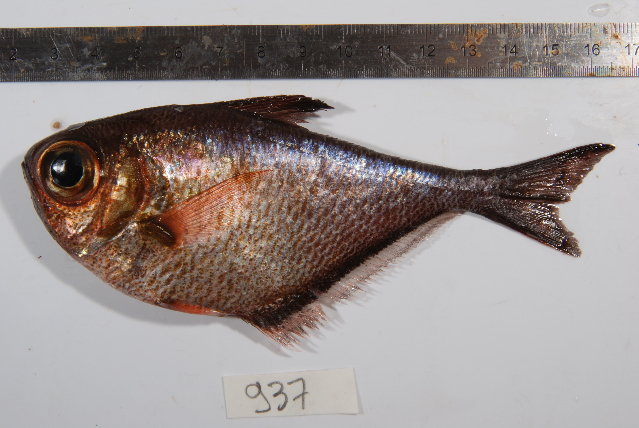

Scientific classification
- Kingdom: Animalia
- Phylum: Chordata
- Class: Actinopterygii
- Order: Acropomatiformes
- Family: Pempheridae
- Genus: Pempheris
- Species: P. adusta

Binomial name
- Pempheris adusta Pieter Bleeker, 1877

= Pempheris adusta =

Species of fish

Pempheris adusta, the dusky sweeper, is a species of marine ray-finned fish in the family Pempheridae, the sweepers. It is common species on coral reefs in the Indo-Pacific region.

== Description ==
Pempheris adusta has 6 spines in its dorsal fin which also has 8-10 soft rays, the anal fin has 3 spines and 36-45 soft rays, this species also has 25 vertebrae. It is distinguished from related species by having a blackish spot at the base of the pectoral fin, a lateral-line with 56-64 pored scales, 4.5-6.5 scale rows above the lateral line, there is a distinct blackish band on the margin of the anal fin, and they have blackish band on margin of the caudal fin. The largest recorded total length is 17 cm (6.7 in).

== Distribution ==
Pempheris adusta has an Indo-Pacific distribution which extends from the Red Sea and the eastern coast of Africa through the Indian Ocean to the western central Pacific Ocean.

== Habitat and biology ==
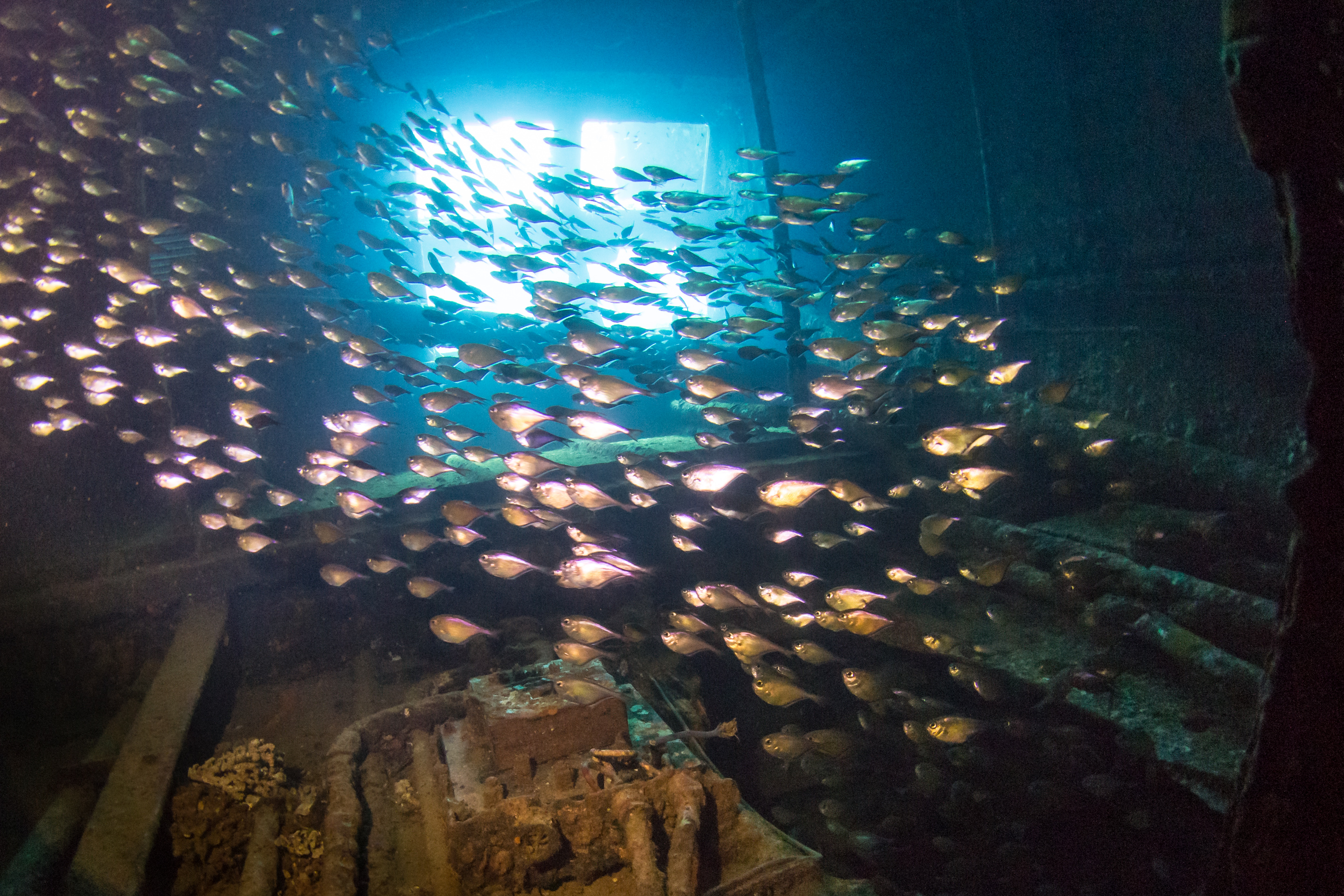
Pempheris adusta shoal in a shipwreck in the Red Sea off Egypt

Pempheris adusta has a depth range of 0–20 m (0–66 ft) and it is a common species of coral reefs where it forms aggregations during the day in caves or crevices or below overhangs. A few can sometimes be seen out in the open in the day, near the shelter provided by reefs. It has been recorded in small groups with Myripristis murdjan less than 1 m (3 ft) below the surface. It emerges from its shelters at night to feed on zooplankton.

Spawning takes place during April to June, although it occurs all year in Okinawa. Spawning takes place after sunset and only individuals with a standard length greater than 11 centimetres (4.3 in) join in the spawning group.

== Taxonomy ==
Pempheris adusta was first formally described in 1877 by Pieter Bleeker with the type locality being Ambon in the Moluccas. The specific name adusta is derived from the Latin adustus which means "browned" or "scorched".

Different populations have been treated as subspecies in the past by some authorities but other workers have found little genetic variation between populations over its wide and continuous range.
