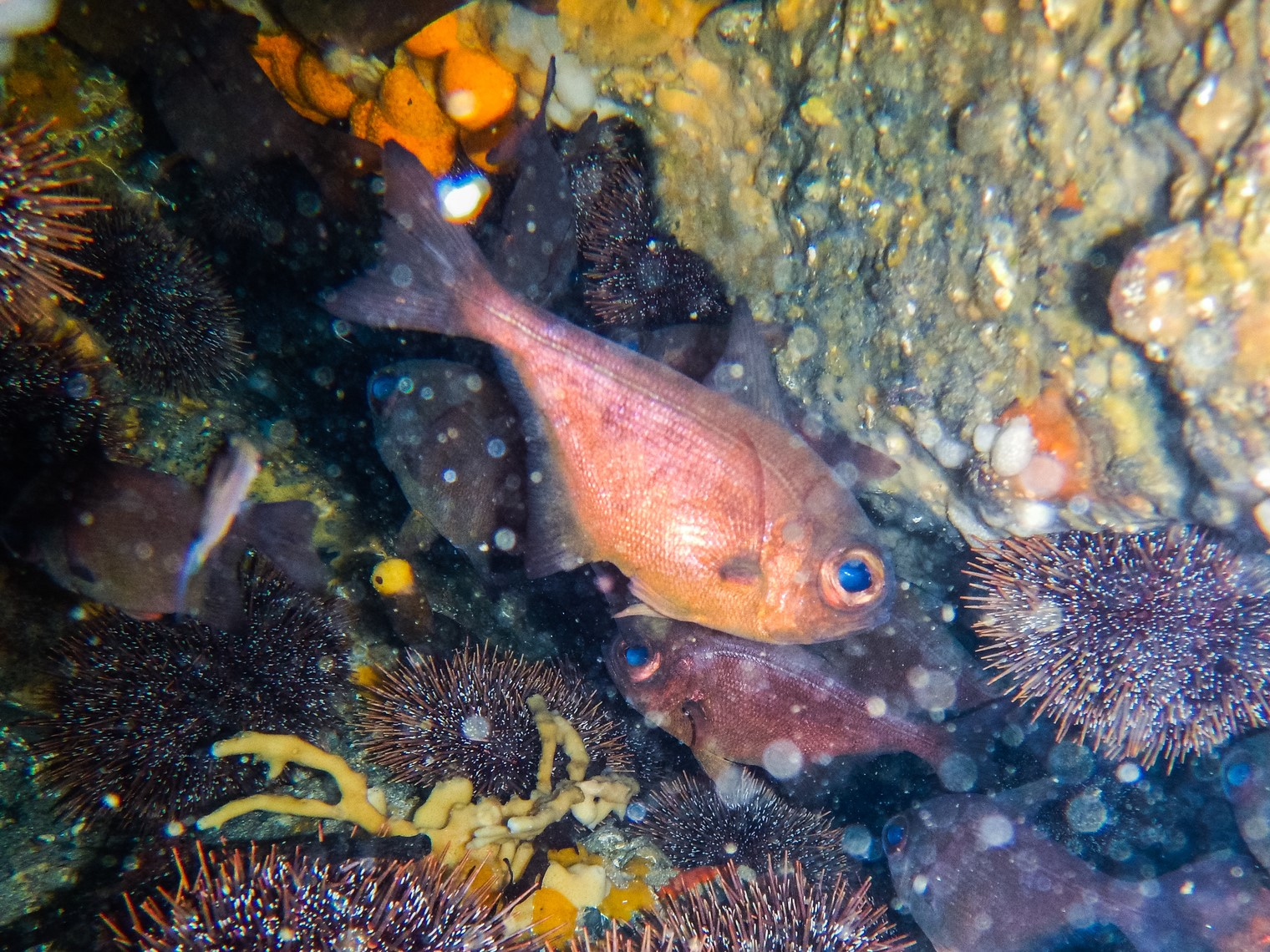

Scientific classification
- Kingdom: Animalia
- Phylum: Chordata
- Class: Actinopterygii
- Order: Acropomatiformes
- Family: Pempheridae
- Genus: Pempheris
- Species: P. adspersa

Binomial name
- Pempheris adspersa Griffin, 1927

= New Zealand bigeye =

Species of fish

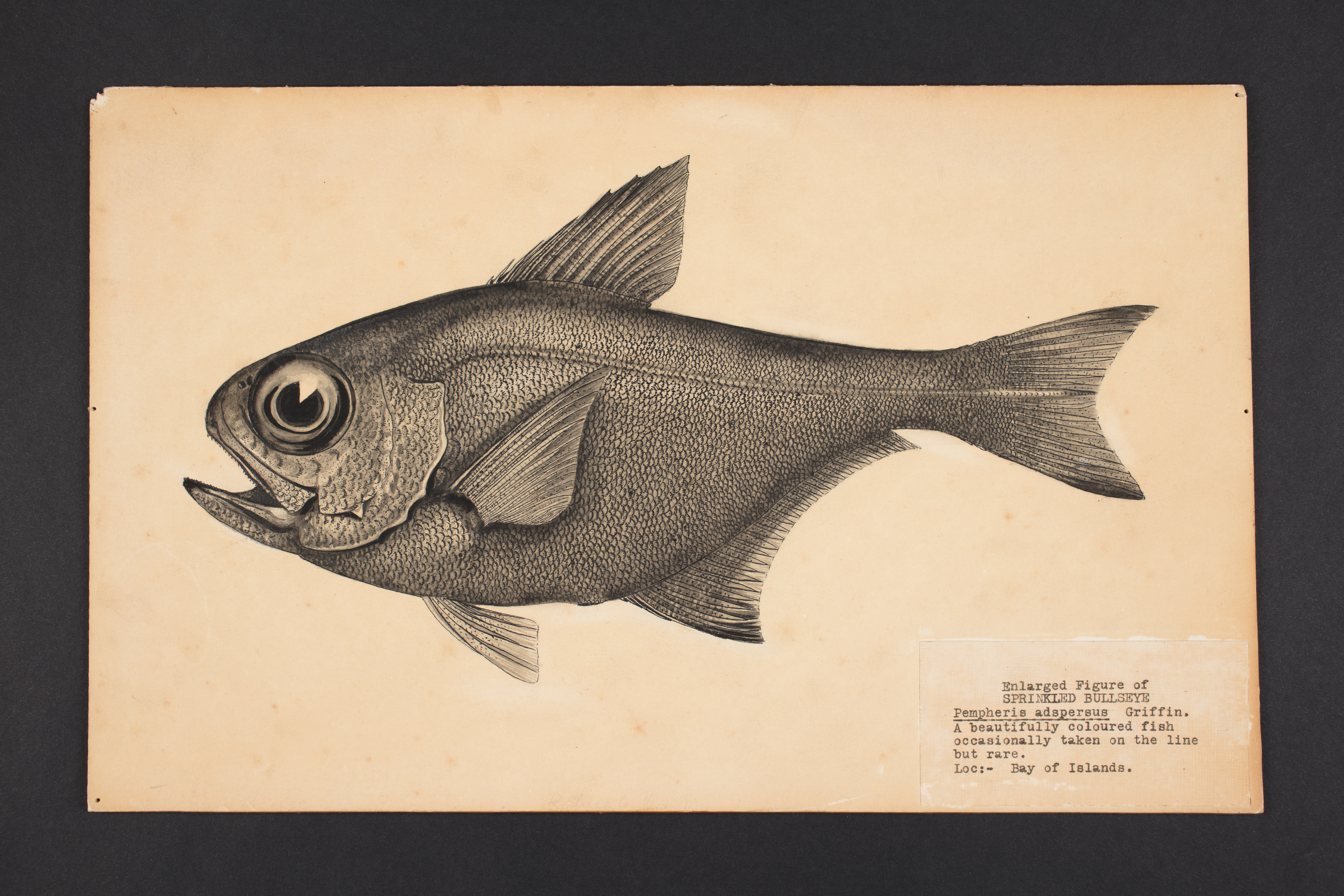
Illustration by Louis Thomas Griffin (c. 1920)

The New Zealand bigeye (Pempheris adspersa) is a species of marine ray-finned fish, a sweeper from the family Pempheridae. It is endemic to the waters around New Zealand. It inhabitants rocky shores with plentiful overhangs and crevices at depths of from near the surface to 70 metres (230 ft).

== Description ==
The New Zealand bigeyes has large eyes, as its name suggests and a deeply keeled and compressed body. Its body is dark in colour and is marked all over with small spots. This species can reach a length of 15.8 centimetres (6.2 in) SL.

== Distribution ==
The New Zealand bigeye is endemic to the northeastern coast of the North Island of New Zealand.

== Biology ==
=== Behaviour ===
This species is nocturnal. They feed on plankton and some benthic organisms. Some groups have been observed to travel well upstream at night to feed on shrimps, amphipods, crab larvae, and other zooplankton. During the day, these fish shelter in crevices or caves, or under overhangs and ledges. When they emerge from their shelter at night, they have been found to use vocalisations and popping to maintain social contact within a shoal.

Gravid females have been collected from mid-November up until February and spawning has been observed to occur at the same time with the juveniles settling from January to April. Juveniles have been recorded from weed growing along rock shorelines in the late (Austral) summer. The bigeyes have also been recorded swimming into estuaries to feed on zooplankton among mangrove forests. It ranges in depth from 0–70 metres (0–230 ft)

=== Hearing ===
They perceive sounds through a specialisation of the swim bladder, Baudelot's ligament and their lateral line.
