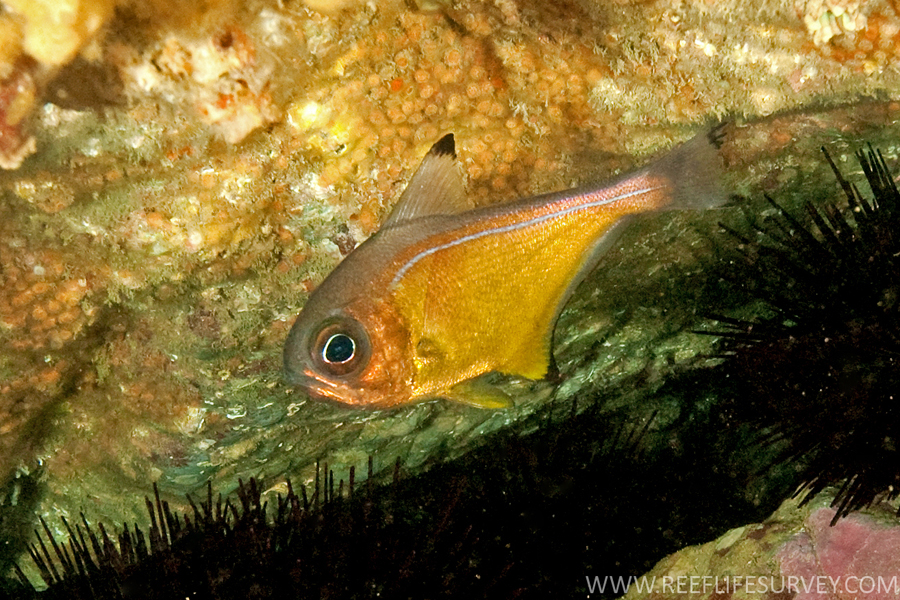

Scientific classification
- Kingdom: Animalia
- Phylum: Chordata
- Class: Actinopterygii
- Order: Acropomatiformes
- Family: Pempheridae
- Genus: Pempheris
- Species: P. affinis

Binomial name
- Pempheris affinis Allan Riverstone McCulloch, 1911

= Pempheris affinis =

Species of fish

Pempheris affinis, the black-tipped bullseye, is a species of marine ray-finned fish in the family Pempheridae, the sweepers. It is from the southwestern Pacific Ocean.

== Description ==
Pempheris affinis the characteristic profile of species within the genus Pempheris with a large head, nearly straight back and a rapidly tapering lower body, the body being deeply compressed and having a covering of small ctenoid scales. Its eyes are very large, as is the obliquely angled mouth and a large obliquely-angled mouth. The body is greyish above with yellow or silvery flanks and it has black tips to the dorsal and anal fin as well as a black margin to the caudal fin. There are 5 spines and 10-11 soft rays in the dorsal fin while the anal fin has 3 spines and 38-42 soft rays. This species is Bioluminescent. They can attain a total length of 15 centimetres (5.9 in),

== Distribution ==
Pempheris affinis is endemic to eastern Australia where it is found from Hervey Bay, Queensland in the north south to, at least, Montague Island in New South Wales.

== Habitat and biology ==
Pempheris affinis is found on rocky reefs down to at least 30 metres (98 ft) in depth. In the day it is frequently recorded in aggregations in caves and under ledges. This is a nocturnal species. In places this fish can be so abundant it forms dense shoals which an observer may be unable to see through. It forms mixed schls with the smallscale bullseye P. compressa.

== Species description ==
Pempheris affinis was first formally described in 1911 by Allan Riverstone McCulloch with the type locality given as Port Jackson, New South Wales.
