= Pempheris rochai =

Scientific classification
- Domain: Eukaryota
- Kingdom: Animalia
- Phylum: Chordata
- Class: Actinopterygii
- Order: Acropomatiformes
- Family: Pempheridae
- Genus: Pempheris
- Species: P. rochai

Binomial name
- Pempheris rochai J. E. Randall & Victor, 2015

Species of ray-finned fish

Pempheris rochai, commonly known as Rocha's sweeper, is a species of sweeper fish of the family Pempheridae. It's found in the northern Indian Ocean, on shallow reefs along the coast of Oman.

== Etymology ==
It was named after Luiz A. Rocha to honor his contributions to ichthyology.
