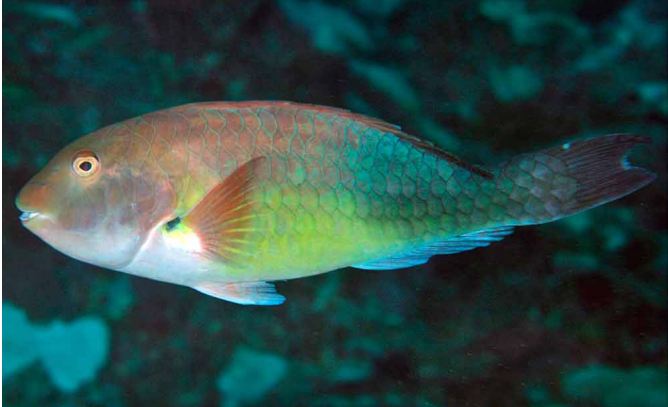

Scientific classification
- Kingdom: Animalia
- Phylum: Chordata
- Class: Actinopterygii
- Order: Labriformes
- Family: Labridae
- Genus: Sparisoma
- Species: S. choati

Binomial name
- Sparisoma choati Rocha, Brito & D. R. Robertson, 2012

= Sparisoma choati =

Species of fish

Sparisoma choati, the West-African parrotfish, is a species of marine ray-finned fish from the family Scaridae. It occurs at depths between 2 and 30m, along west African coastline and islands from Cape Verde and Senegal south to the offshore islands of the Gulf of Guinea and northern Angola. Like other parrotfish of the genus Sparisoma, it lives on rocky reefs and grazes on algae growing over hard substrate. It was named in honor of J. Howard Choat, in recognition of his extensive scientific work on parrotfishes.
