= Kwab (disambiguation) =

Kwab may refer to:

- Sparisoma chrysopterum, a species of parrotfish also known as kwab or pink kwab
- KWAB-TV, a television station in Big Spring, Texas, now known as KCWO-TV
- KWAB-AM 1490 Boulder, Colorado former Working Assets Broadcasting radio station circa 2000

== See also ==
- Kwabs (Kwabena Adjepong; born 1990), London-based singer of Ghanaian descent
