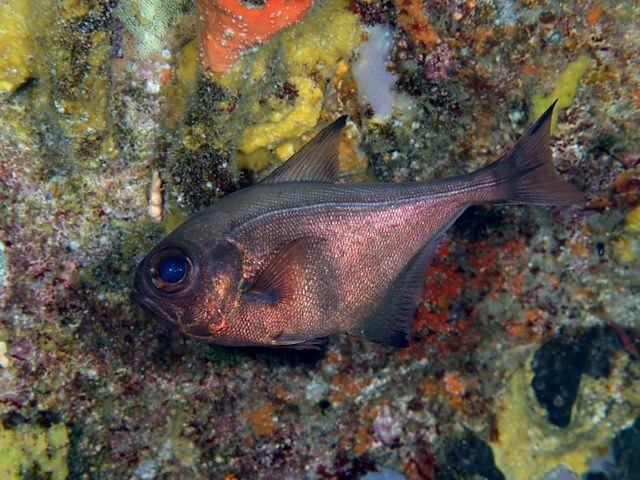
- Pempheris japonica
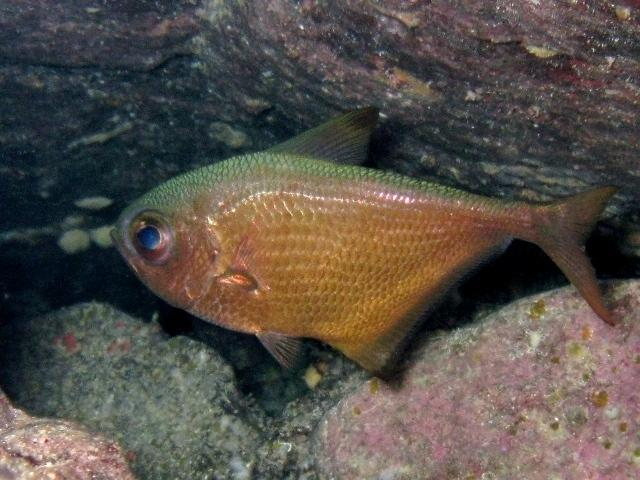
- Pempheris rhomboidea

Scientific classification
- Kingdom: Animalia
- Phylum: Chordata
- Class: Actinopterygii
- Order: Acropomatiformes
- Family: Pempheridae
- Genus: Pempheris; G. Cuvier, 1829

Type species
- Pempheris touea G. Cuvier, 1829

Synonyms
- Catalufa Snyder, 1911; Liopempheris Ogilby, 1913; Priacanthopsis Fowler, 1906

= Pempheris =

Genus of ray-finned fishes

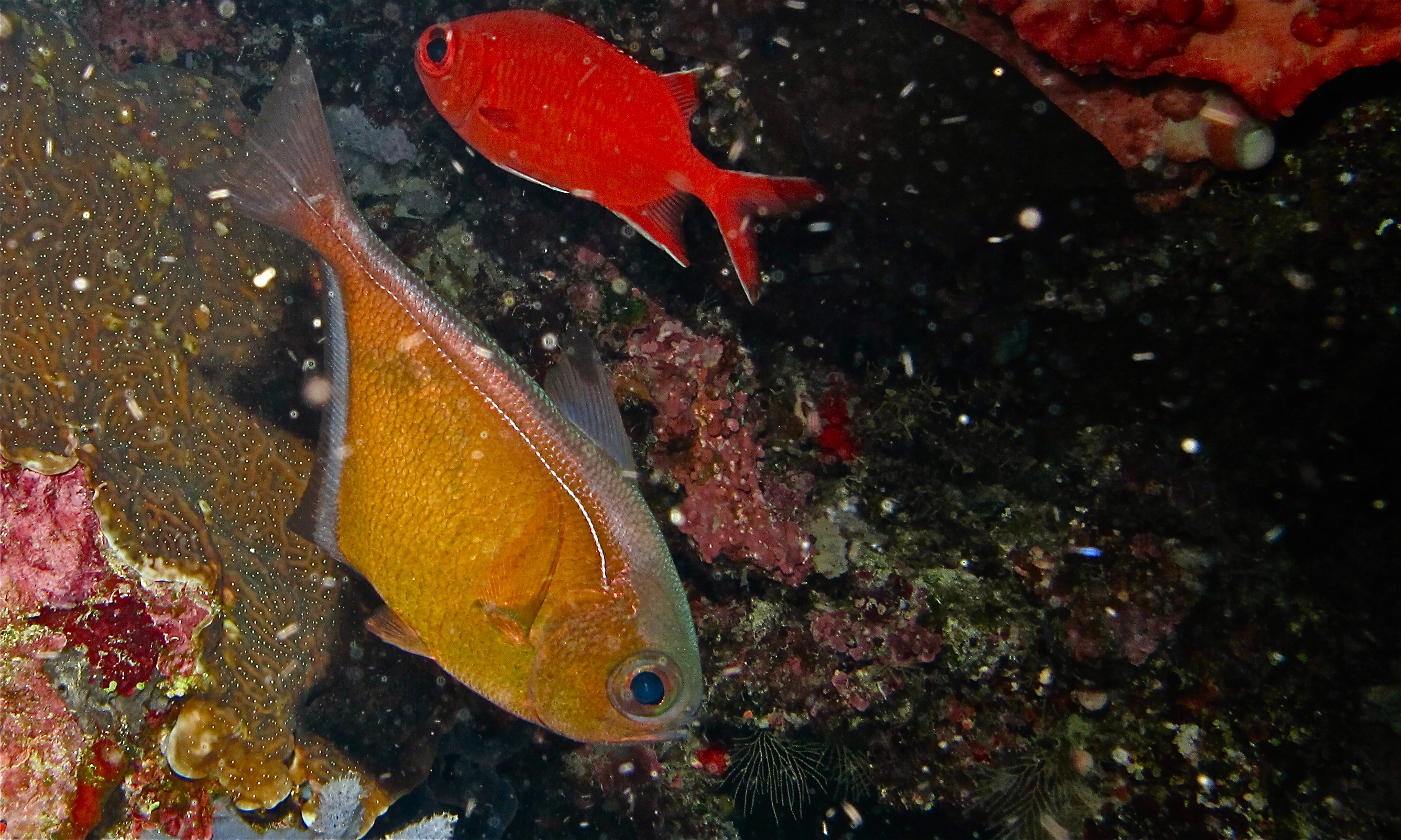
Pempheris vanicolensis (front)

Pempheris is a genus of sweepers native to the Atlantic, Indian and Pacific Ocean.

== Species ==
There are currently more than 70 recognized species in this genus:

- Pempheris adspersa Griffin, 1927 (New Zealand bigeye)
- Pempheris adusta Bleeker, 1877 (Dusky sweeper)
- Pempheris affinis McCulloch, 1911 (Black-tipped sweeper)
- Pempheris analis Waite, 1910 (Bronze sweeper)
- Pempheris andilana J. E. Randall & Victor, 2015
- Pempheris argyrea J. E. Randall & Victor, 2015
- Pempheris bexillon Mooi & J. E. Randall, 2014
- Pempheris bineeshi J. E. Randall & Victor, 2015
- Pempheris bruggemanni J. E. Randall & Victor, 2015
- Pempheris compressa (J. White, 1790) (Small-scale sweeper, small-scale bullseye)
- Pempheris connelli J. E. Randall & Victor, 2015
- Pempheris convexa J. E. Randall & Victor, 2014
- Pempheris cuprea J. E. Randall & Victor, 2014
- Pempheris darvelli J. E. Randall & Victor, 2014
- Pempheris eatoni J. E. Randall & Victor, 2014
- Pempheris ellipse J. E. Randall & Victor, 2015
- Pempheris familia Koeda & Motomura, 2017
- Pempheris flavicycla J. E. Randall, Satapoomin & Alpermann, 2013
  - P. f. flavicycla J. E. Randall, Satapoomin & Alpermann, 2013 (Yellow-eye sweeper)
  - P. f. marisrubri J. E. Randall, Bogorodsky & Alpermann, 2013
- Pempheris gasparinii H. T. Pinheiro, Bernardi & L. A. Rocha, 2016 (Trindade sweeper)
- Pempheris hadra J. E. Randall & Victor, 2015
- Pempheris heemstraorum J. E. Randall & Victor, 2015
- Pempheris hollemani J. E. Randall & Victor, 2015
- Pempheris ibo J. E. Randall & Victor, 2015
- Pempheris japonica Döderlein (de), 1883
- Pempheris klunzingeri McCulloch, 1911 (Klunzinger's sweeper)
- Pempheris kruppi J. E. Randall, Victor & Aideed, 2015
- Pempheris kuriamuria J. E. Randall & Victor, 2015
- Pempheris leiolepis J. E. Randall & Victor, 2015
- Pempheris malabarica G. Cuvier, 1831
- Pempheris mangula G. Cuvier, 1829 (Black-edged sweeper)
- Pempheris megalops J. E. Randall & Victor, 2015
- Pempheris micromma J. E. Randall & Victor, 2015
- Pempheris molucca G. Cuvier, 1829
- Pempheris multiradiata Klunzinger, 1879 (Common sweeper)
- Pempheris muscat J. E. Randall & Victor, 2015
- Pempheris nesogallica G. Cuvier, 1831
- Pempheris nyctereutes D. S. Jordan & Evermann, 1902
- Pempheris orbis J. E. Randall & Victor, 2015
- Pempheris ornata Mooi & R. N. Jubb, 1996 (Orange-lined sweeper)
- Pempheris otaitensis G. Cuvier, 1831
- Pempheris oualensis G. Cuvier, 1831 (Silver sweeper)
- Pempheris pathirana J. E. Randall & Victor, 2015
- Pempheris peza J. E. Randall & Victor, 2015
- Pempheris poeyi T. H. Bean, 1885 (Curved sweeper)
- Pempheris rapa Mooi, 1998
- Pempheris rhomboidea Kossman & Räuber, 1877 (Dusky sweeper)
- Pempheris rochai J. E. Randall & Victor, 2015
- Pempheris rubricauda J. E. Randall & Victor, 2015
- Pempheris russellii F. Day, 1888
- Pempheris sarayu J. E. Randall & Bineesh, 2014
- Pempheris schomburgkii J. P. Müller & Troschel, 1848 (Glassy sweeper)
- Pempheris schreineri A. Miranda-Ribeiro, 1915
- Pempheris schwenkii Bleeker, 1855 (Black-stripe sweeper)
- Pempheris sergey J. E. Randall & Victor, 2015
- Pempheris shimoni J. E. Randall & Victor, 2015
- Pempheris shirleen J. E. Randall & Victor, 2015
- Pempheris smithorum J. E. Randall & Victor, 2015
- Pempheris tau J. E. Randall & Victor, 2015
- Pempheris ternay J. E. Randall & Victor, 2015(seychelles sweeper)
- Pempheris tilman J. E. Randall & Victor, 2015
- Pempheris tiran J. E. Randall & Victor, 2015
- Pempheris tominagai Koeda, Yoshino & Tachihara, 2014
- Pempheris trinco J. E. Randall & Victor, 2015
- Pempheris ufuagari Koeda, Yoshino & Tachihara, 2013 (Crown sweeper)
- Pempheris vanicolensis G. Cuvier, 1831 (Vanikoro sweeper)
- Pempheris viridis J. E. Randall & Victor, 2015
- Pempheris wilsoni J. E. Randall & Victor, 2015
- Pempheris xanthomma J. E. Randall & Victor, 2015
- Pempheris xanthoptera Tominaga, 1963
- Pempheris ypsilychnus Mooi & R. N. Jubb, 1996 (Ypsilon sweeper)
- Pempheris zajonzi J. E. Randall & Victor, 2015
