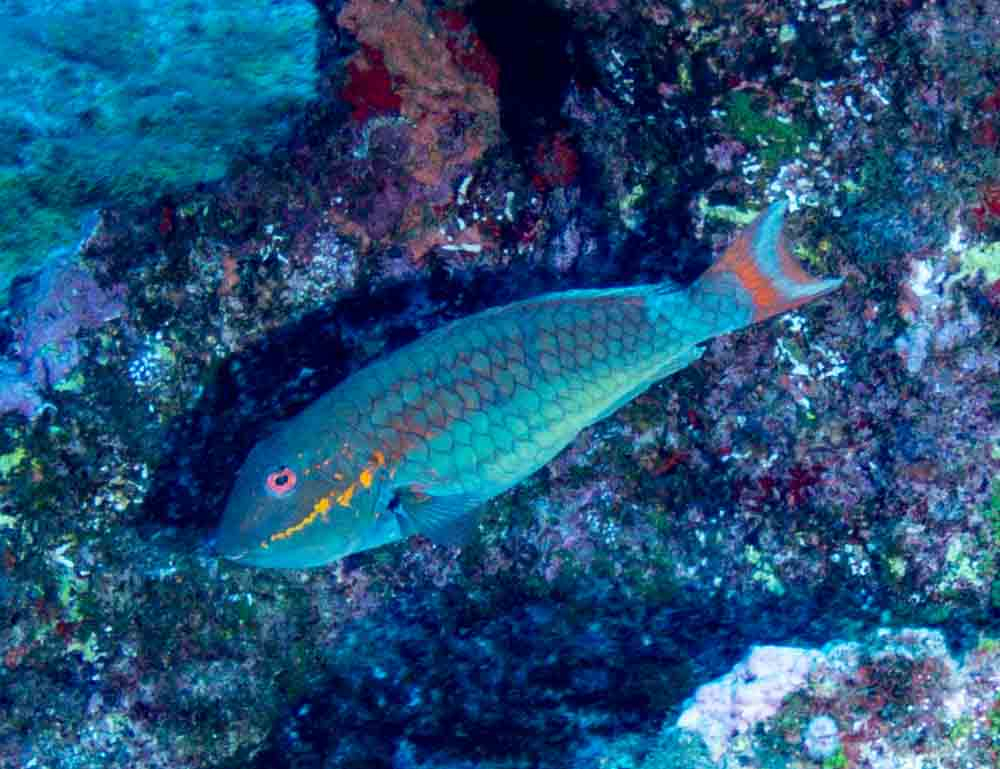

Scientific classification
- Kingdom: Animalia
- Phylum: Chordata
- Class: Actinopterygii
- Order: Labriformes
- Family: Labridae
- Genus: Sparisoma
- Species: S. rocha

Binomial name
- Sparisoma rocha Pinheiro, Gasparini & I. Sazima, 2010

= Sparisoma rocha =

Species of fish

Sparisoma rocha or Trindade parrotfish is a species of parrotfish endemic to the islands of Trindade and Martin Vaz in southeastern Brazil. The species can be distinguished from its congeners easily by its coloration. S. rocha is a herbivore, grazing on algae that grows on rocks or coralline substrate.

== Etymology ==
It was named after Luiz A. Rocha to honor his contributions to ichthyology.
