= Kleptoprotein =

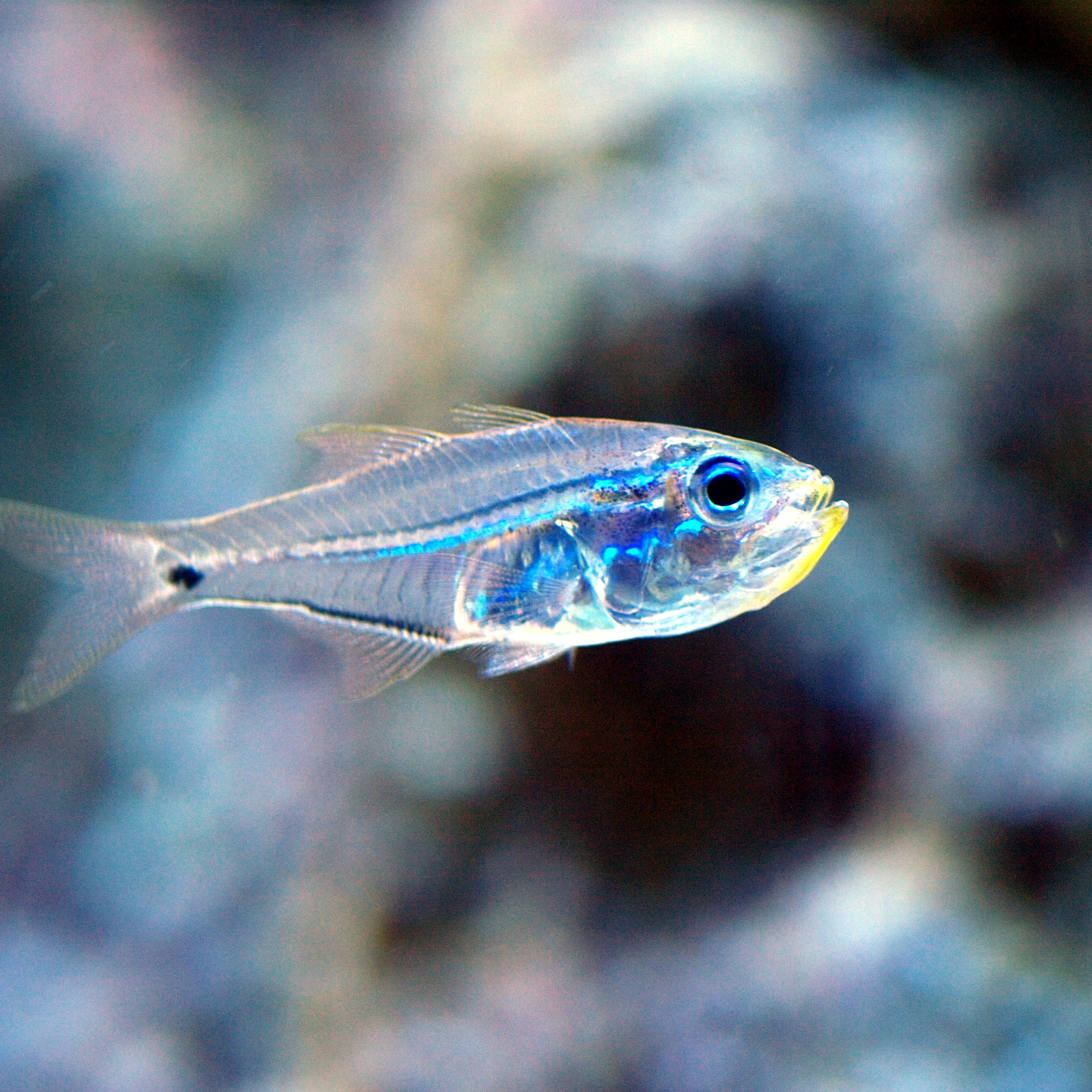
The bioluminescent fish Parapriacanthus ransonneti, which obtains its luciferase protein from its diet, rather than encoding it within its own genome

A kleptoprotein is a protein which is not encoded in the genome of the organism which uses it, but instead is obtained through diet from a prey organism. Importantly, a kleptoprotein must maintain its function and be mostly or entirely undigested, drawing a distinction from proteins that are digested for nutrition, which become destroyed and non-functional in the process.

This phenomenon was first reported in the bioluminescent fish Parapriacanthus, which has specialized light organs adapted towards counter-illumination, but obtains the luciferase enzyme within these organs from bioluminescent ostracods, including Cypridina noctiluca or Vargula hilgendorfii.

== See also ==
- Kleptoplasty
- Kleptocnidy
