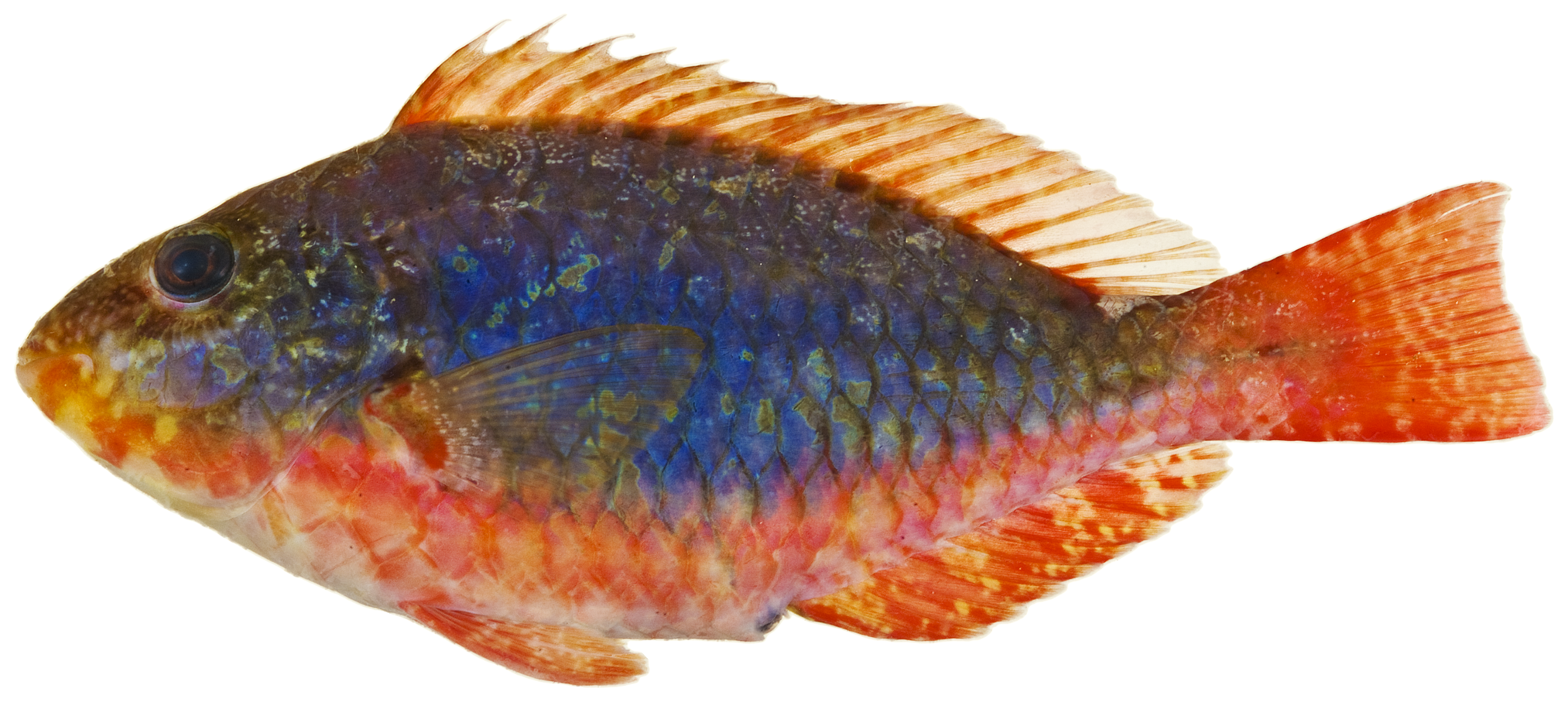
- Female specimen, initial colour phase

Conservation status
- Least Concern (IUCN 3.1)

Scientific classification
- Kingdom: Animalia
- Phylum: Chordata
- Class: Actinopterygii
- Order: Labriformes
- Family: Labridae
- Genus: Sparisoma
- Species: S. aurofrenatum

Binomial name
- Sparisoma aurofrenatum (Valenciennes, 1840)

Synonyms
- Scarus aurofrenatus Valenciennes, 1840; Scarus distinctus Poey, 1861; Sparisoma distinctum (Poey, 1861)

= Sparisoma aurofrenatum =

Species of fish

Sparisoma aurofrenatum (common names: redband parrotfish, gutong, rainbow parrot, black parrot, and blisterside) is a species of parrotfish native to the Caribbean Sea and Western Atlantic Ocean.

== Description ==
This species grows to 28 cm.

=== Initial phase ===
During the initial phase, the colouration varies greatly from blue-green to green to solid olive. The fins are mottled brown to red and have two white stripes. Behind the dorsal fin, a white spot is present.

=== Juvenile phase ===
The body of juvenile specimens are shades of red-brown. Normally, two white stripes will be visible with a black blotch present behind the upper gill covers. A white spot will also be present behind the dorsal fin.

During both the juvenile and initial phases, colouration and markings can change quickly.

=== Terminal phase ===
The body becomes greenish during the terminal phase. The underside will appear lighter and the anal fin becomes reddish. The tail becomes more square-shaped with black outer tips. The upper portion of the forebody will display a small, yellow blotch with at least two small black dots.

Normally, an orangish-pink colour band will be present starting from below the eye along to the corner of the mouth. A white spot will appear behind the dorsal fin.

== Distribution ==
This species occurs throughout the Caribbean Sea, and the western Atlantic Ocean in the waters of Bermuda, Florida, the Bahamas to Central America and Brazil.

== Habitat ==
Sparisoma aurofrenatum lives on reefs in depths of 2 to 20 metres. The juveniles live among seagrass beds.

== Behaviour ==
Sparisoma aurofrenatum is solitary or found in small groups. It may found resting on the bottom. It is a protogynous hermaphrodite.

While swimming about reefs, this fish will use only its pectoral fins. Only when requiring a sudden burst of speed will it use its tail.

Specimens may be seen defecating frequently, which appears as a white cloud as it is mostly composed of coral limestone.

== Diet ==
Sparisoma aurofrenatum is a herbivore, feeding on algae and polyps it scrapes from rocks and coral using its 'beak'.
