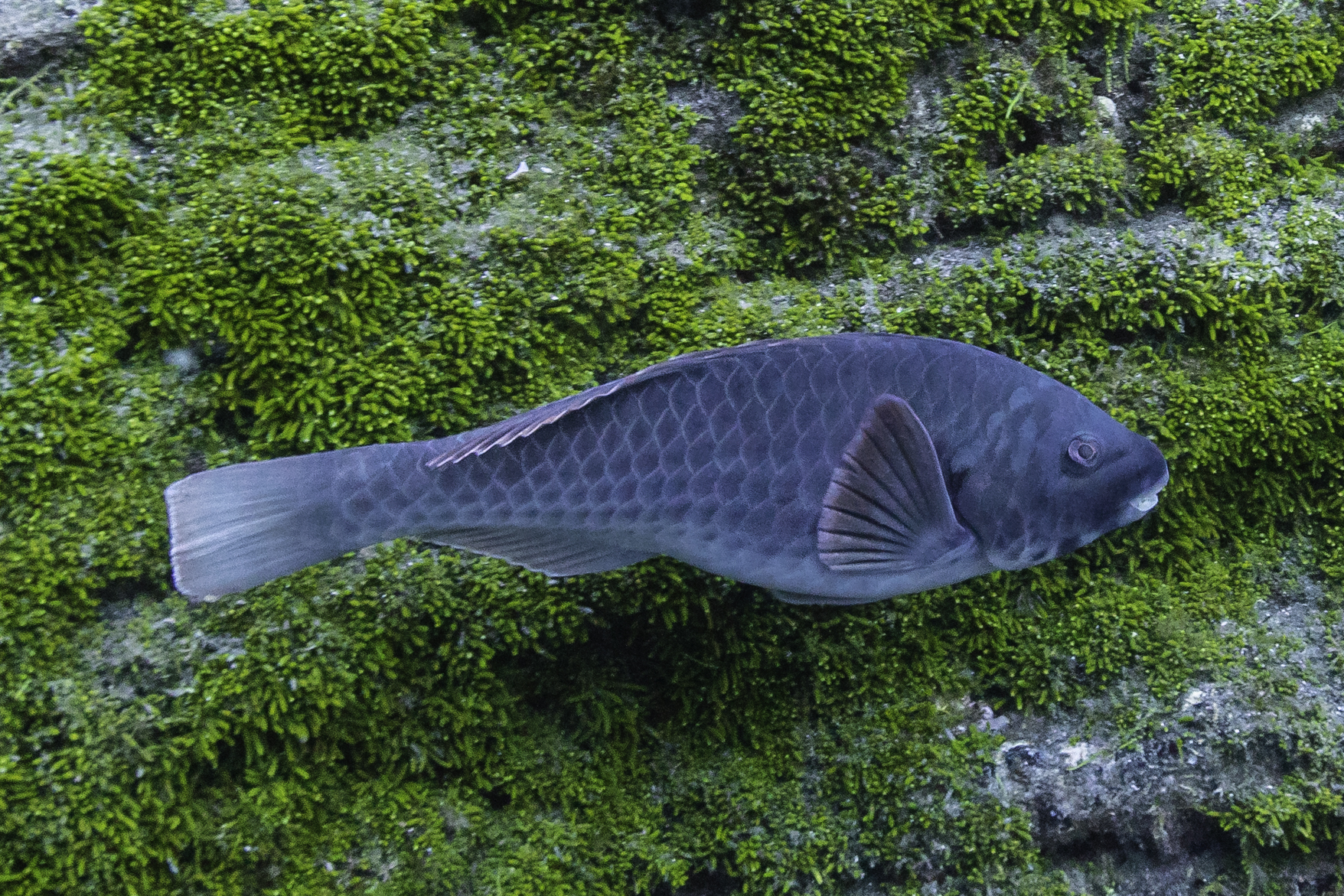
- Adult Male, Faial, Azores
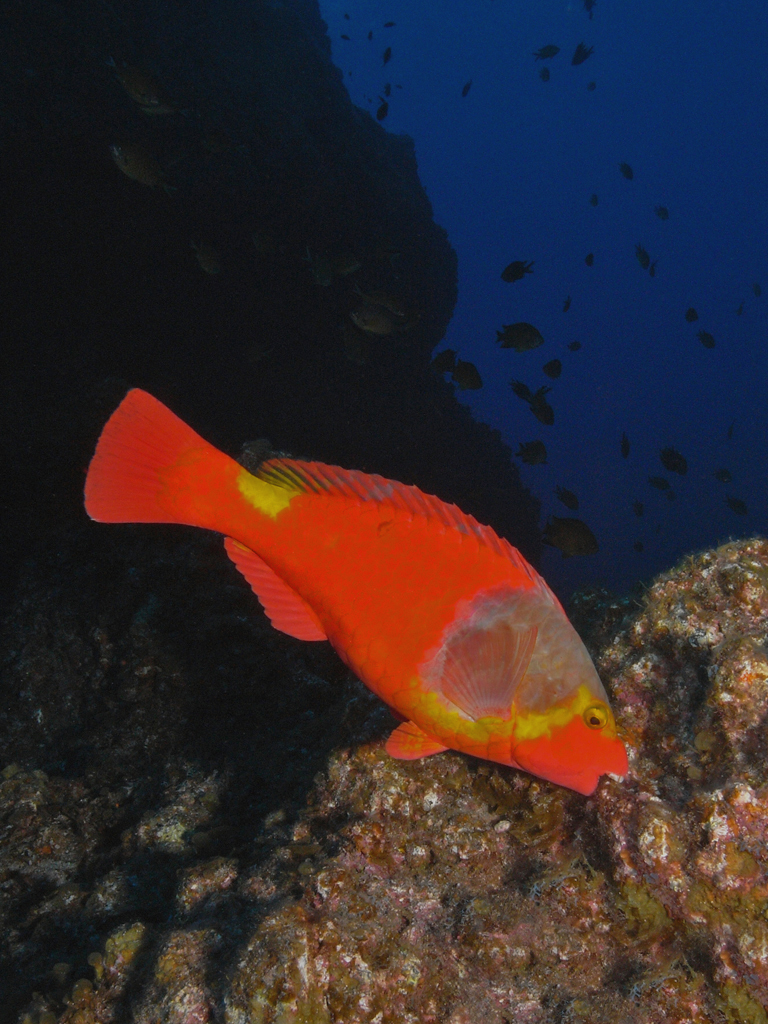
- Adult Female, El Hierro, Canary Islands

Conservation status
- Least Concern (IUCN 3.1)

Scientific classification
- Kingdom: Animalia
- Phylum: Chordata
- Class: Actinopterygii
- Order: Labriformes
- Family: Labridae
- Genus: Sparisoma
- Species: S. cretense

Binomial name
- Sparisoma cretense (Linnaeus, 1758)

Synonyms
- List: Labrus cretensis Linnaeus, 1758; Euscarus cretensis (Linnaeus, 1758); Scarus cretensis (Linnaeus, 1758); Sparidosoma cretense (Linnaeus, 1758); Sparisoma cretensis (Linnaeus, 1758); Scarus mutabilis Lowe, 1838; Scarus canariensis Valenciennes, 1838; Scarus rubiginosus Valenciennes, 1840; Calliodon rubiginosus (Valenciennes, 1840); Scarus siculus Cocco, 1846; Scarus rubiginoides Guichenot, 1865

= Sparisoma cretense =

Species of fish

The Mediterranean parrotfish (Sparisoma cretense), also known as the European parrotfish, is a species of parrotfish found at depths up to 50 m (160 ft) along rocky shores in the Mediterranean and the eastern Atlantic, from Portugal south to Senegal. It is generally common, but uncommon or rare (locally even absent) in the northwestern Mediterranean and in the Adriatic Sea. It prefers relatively warm temperatures and there is an ongoing northward range expansion, possibly due to global warming. The primary adult habitat is rocky reefs, especially in areas with macroalgae, but they may visit adjacent seagrass patches. Juveniles also occur more widely in the latter habitat.

In parts of its range it is a commercially important food fish. Although some populations have been affected by fishing pressure, it is not considered threatened. It has been studied in detail in parts of its range, including the Azores.

== Behavior ==
The Mediterranean parrotfish feeds primarily on epilithic and coralline algae, but may also take epiphytic algae (growing on seagrass) and small invertebrates. The jaws and dentition are specially adapted to this feeding.

It primarily breeds during the summer, from July to September, but breeding can occur as early as May and late as December. It is a diurnal fish, but spawning is around dawn or dusk and can occur in pairs or groups. The pelagic eggs hatch into free-swimming larvae. The pelagic stage for the eggs and larvae is 50–60 days in Sparisoma parrotfish, after which they settle on rocky reefs and among seagrass.

== Appearance ==
As its relatives, this parrotfish starts as female and then changes to male (known as the terminal phase). However, unlike most of its relatives, it is a secondary gonochorist. This means that some females do not change sex (they remain females throughout their lives), the ones that do change from female to male do it while still immature (reproductively functioning females do not change to males) and there are no males with female-like colours (known as initial phase males in other parrotfish).

Juveniles less than 7 cm (3 in) long are mottled with a yellowish head and have undifferentiated gonads (not male or female). Immatures that are 7–12 cm (3–5 in) long are mottled brownish and have immature female gonads (ovaries). If stressed, they adopt a pattern with broad horizontal white stripes. At larger sizes, the adult colours appear and the male or female gonads are mature. The adult females are red with a yellow-edged greyish saddle shape on the back and a yellow spot at the base of the tail. The males are overall greyish with paler underparts and no distinctive markings, although typically with blackish bars on the throat and opercular. Adults reach a maximum length of about 52 cm (20 in), but most are 15–30 cm (6–12 in) long. There is an almost complete overlap in the sizes of the adult females and adult males, although the former are on average smaller than the latter.

== Human usage ==
Sparisoma cretense is a quarry of spearfishers in the Canary Islands. In other parts of its range it is caught and sold as bycatch.

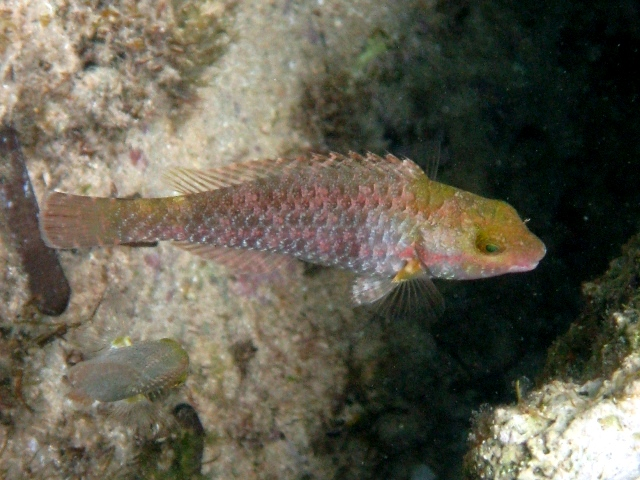
Juvenile Sparisoma cretense photographed in Koufonisi, Greece

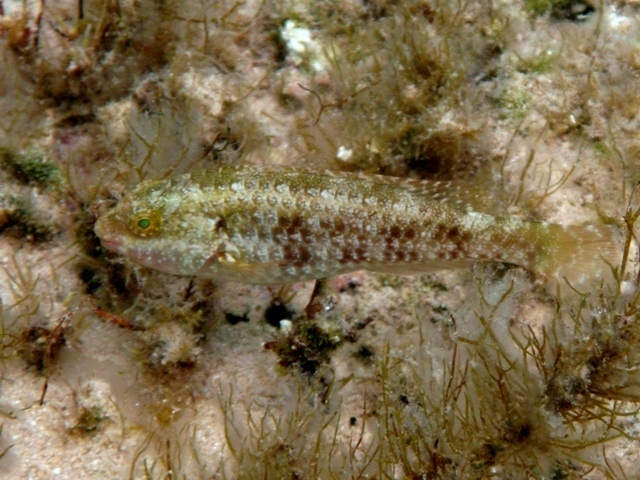
Immature Sparisoma cretense photographed in Koufonisi, Greece

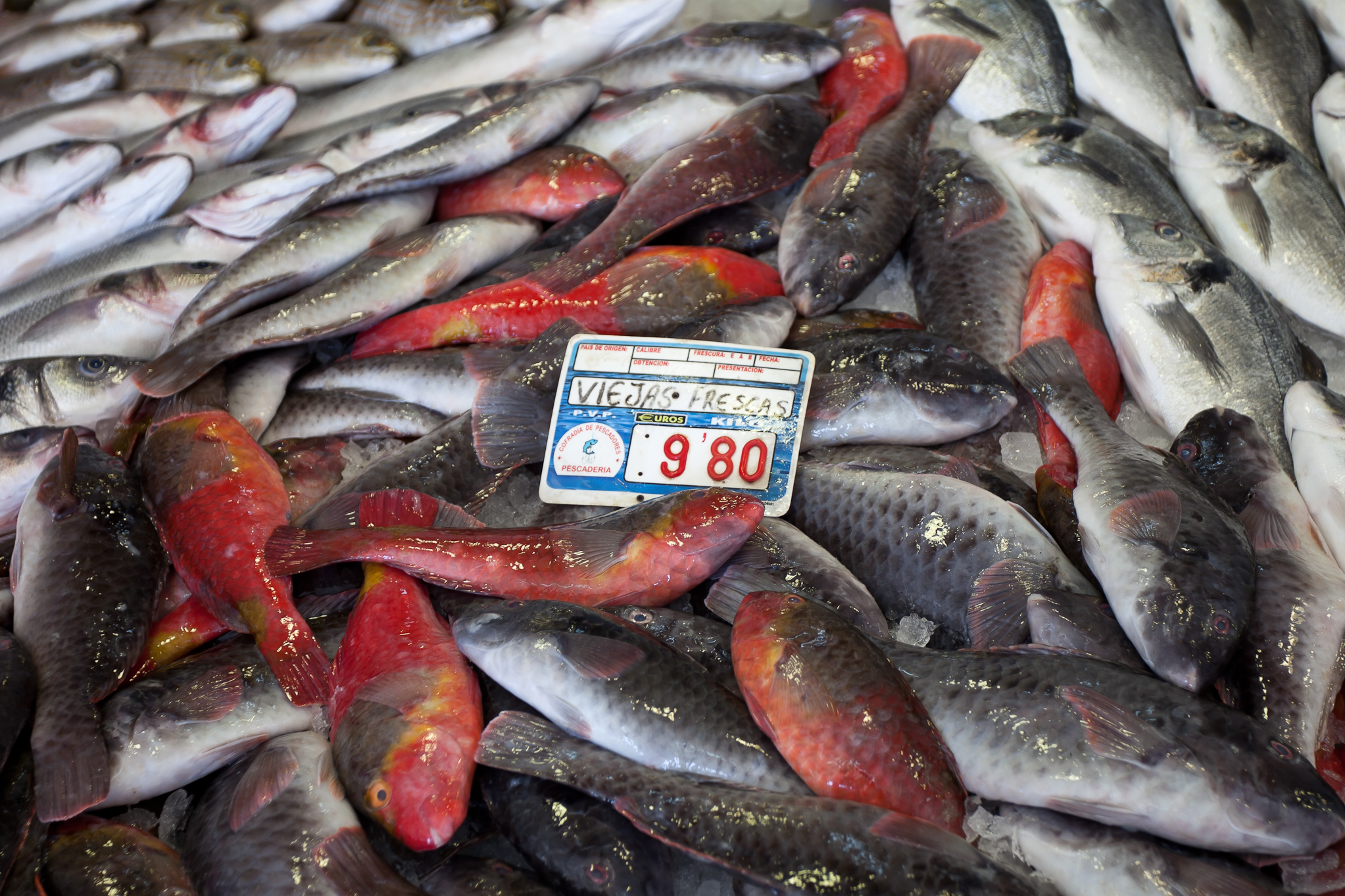
Several males and females on sale at a fish market in Playa Blanca, Lanzarote, Canary Islands, Spain
