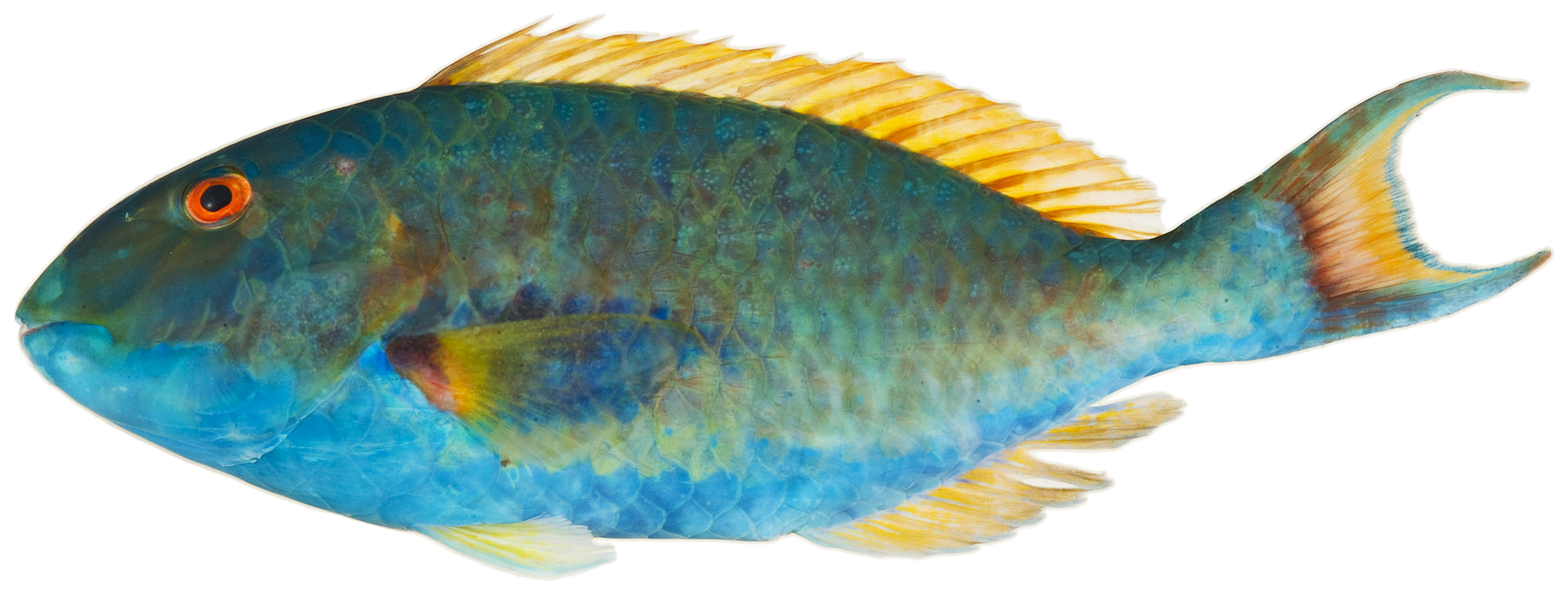
- Male specimen, terminal colour phase

Conservation status
- Least Concern (IUCN 3.1)

Scientific classification
- Kingdom: Animalia
- Phylum: Chordata
- Class: Actinopterygii
- Order: Labriformes
- Family: Labridae
- Genus: Sparisoma
- Species: S. chrysopterum

Binomial name
- Sparisoma chrysopterum (Bloch & Schneider, 1801)

Synonyms
- Scarus chrysopterus Bloch & Schneider, 1801; Sparus abildgaardi Bloch, 1791; Sparisoma abildgaardi (Bloch, 1791); Scarus flavescens Bloch & Schneider, 1801; Sparisoma flavescens (Bloch & Schneider, 1801); Scarus squalidus Poey, 1860; Sparisoma squalidum (Poey, 1860); Scarus brachialis Poey, 1861; Sparisoma brachiale (Poey, 1861)

= Sparisoma chrysopterum =

Species of fish

Sparisoma chrysopterum (common names: redtail parrotfish, blue parrotfish, kwab, pink kwab, pink parrot, blisterside, and blue black-finned chub) is a species of parrotfish.

== Description ==
The upper end of the pectoral fin base shows black saddle-shaped markings while they are young adults. Commonly, there is a light, saddle-shaped area on top of caudal peduncle. The dorsal, pelvic, and anal fins are orange or red in colour.

Juvenile specimens or those in the initial phase have a mottled pattern similar to the substratum. This provides camouflage when they rest on the sea floor.

== Distribution ==
This species lives in the western Atlantic Ocean from Brazil in the south, north to Florida and the Bahamas. It also occurs throughout the Caribbean Sea.

== Diet ==
Sparisoma chrysopterum This species grazes on seagrasses and algae growing in the benthic zone.

== Parasites ==
This species is known to host an ectoparasite in the genus Caligus named Caligus atromaculatus (C.B. Wilson, 1913).

== Species description and taxonomy ==
Sparisoma chrysopterum was first described as Scarus chrysopterus in 1801 by the German naturalists Marcus Elieser Bloch (1723-1799) and Johann Gottlob Theaenus Schneider (1750-1822) with the type locality given as "tropical western Atlantic". When William Swainson described the genus Sparisoma in 1839 he designated Sparus abildgaardi as its type species, Although the specific name abildgaardi would appear to have precedence over chrysopterum, the latter is the more widely used name and the former was long mistakenly thought to be synonymous with Sparisoma viride. The name Sparus abildgaardi was suppressed by the International Commission on Zoological Nomenclature and Scarus chrysopterus was recognised as the type species.
