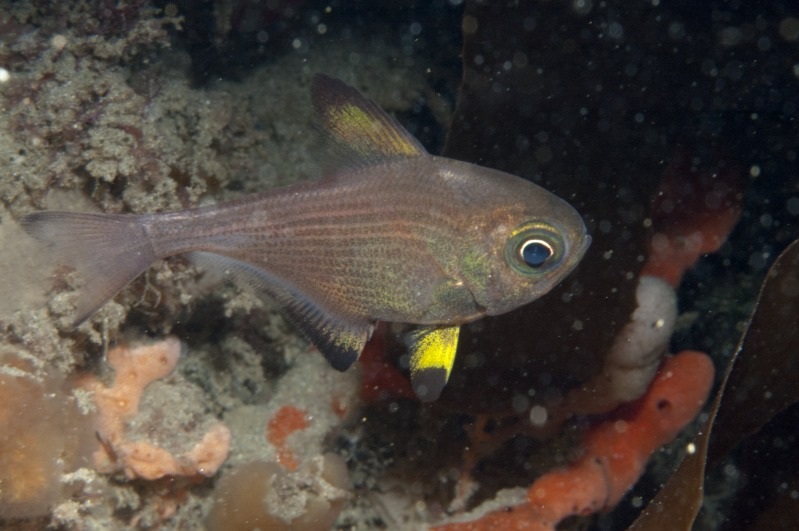

Scientific classification
- Kingdom: Animalia
- Phylum: Chordata
- Class: Actinopterygii
- Order: Acropomatiformes
- Family: Pempheridae
- Genus: Pempheris
- Species: P. multiradiata

Binomial name
- Pempheris multiradiata Klunzinger, 1879

= Pempheris multiradiata =

Species of fish

Pempheris multiradiata, the bigscale bullseye, large-scaled bullseye or common bullseye, is a species of marine ray-finned fish, a sweeper from the family Pempheridae which is found in the coastal waters of southern Australia.

== Description ==
Pempheris multiradiata has a large eye and a large oblique mouth. It has a deep, compressed body which tapers, steeply towards the tail. It has a high dorsal fin with a short base and a long based anal fin, the fin bases being scaled. It has large eyes. The body is covered in large scales which are weakly attached to the skin. In colour this is a pale to dark purplish-brown species, it can be silvery on the belly. It has 8–10 darker horizontal stripes along the flanks, and dark coloured fins. As juveniles they are mainly translucent tinged with bronze to yellowish on the back, the dorsal fin has a black leading edge, the tip of the anal fin is black and the pelvic fins are yellow and have black tips. The dorsal fin has 5 spines and 11 soft rays and the anal fin has 3 spines and 32-39 soft rays. This species attains a total length of 28 centimetres (11 in).

== Distribution ==
Pempheris multiradiata is found in the south eastern Indian Ocean and south western Pacific Ocean where it is endemic to southern Australia where it occurs from Rottnest Island in Western Australia to Newcastle, New South Wales, it also occurs around Tasmania.

== Habitat and biology ==
Pempheris multiradiata inhabits rocky reefs down to depths of 70 metres (230 ft), but it is normally found above 30 metres (98 ft). During the day it forms schools below ledges and within caves, leaving these at night to actively feed. It is the commonest of the Pempheris species off southern Australia. The juveniles form large schools while the adults are more likely to be solitary. They feed in the water column to feed on pelagic invertebrates.

== Species description ==
Pempheris multiradiatus was first formally described by Carl Benjamin Klunzinger in 1879 with the type locality given as King George Sound in Western Australia.
