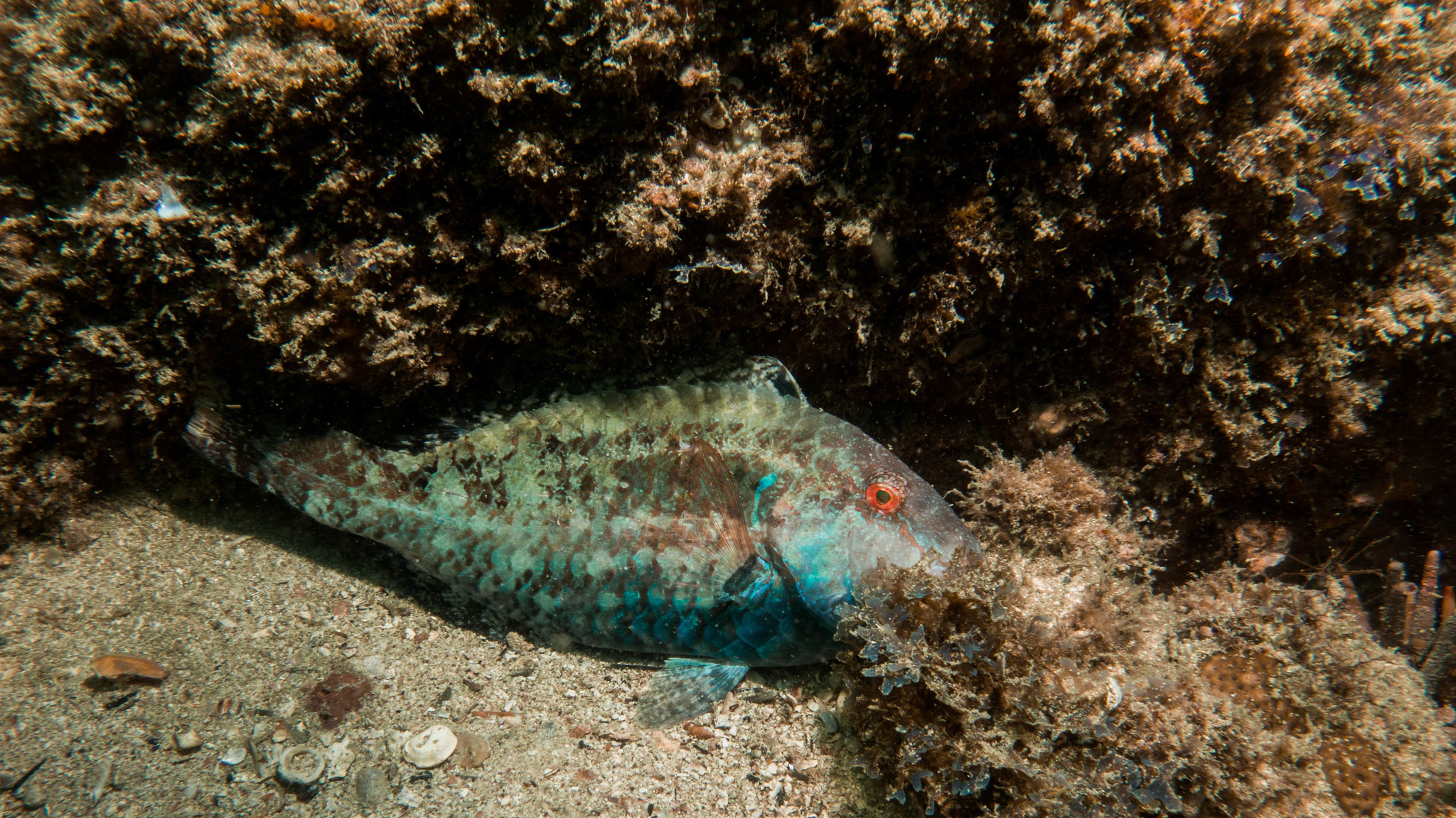

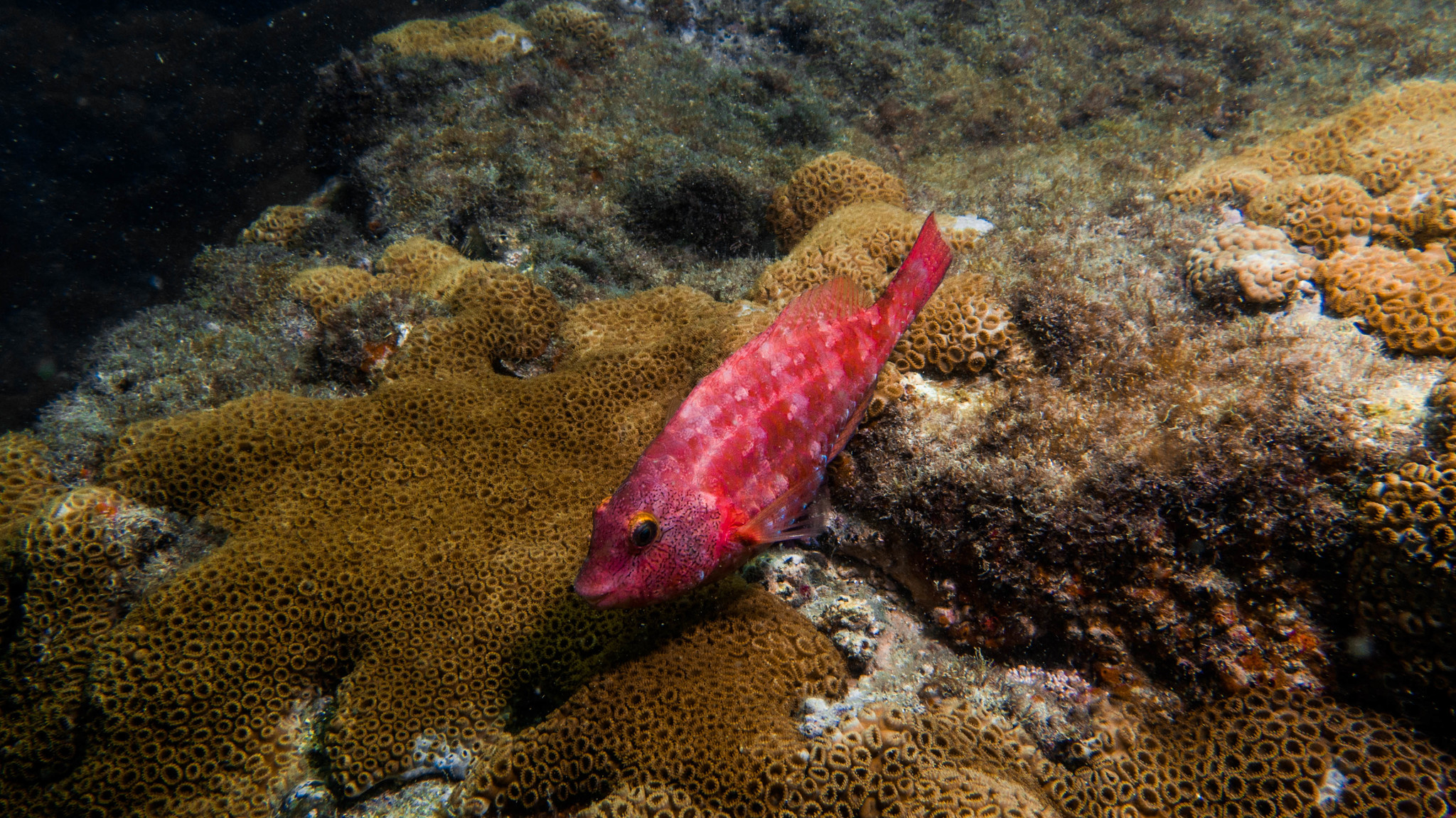
- Terminal phase (top), initial phase (bottom)

Conservation status
- Least Concern (IUCN 3.1)

Scientific classification
- Kingdom: Animalia
- Phylum: Chordata
- Class: Actinopterygii
- Order: Labriformes
- Family: Labridae
- Genus: Sparisoma
- Species: S. tuiupiranga

Binomial name
- Sparisoma tuiupiranga Gasparini, Joyeux & Floeter, 2003

= Sparisoma tuiupiranga =

Species of fish

Sparisoma tuiupiranga is a species of marine ray-finned fish, a parrotfish from the family Scaridae. It has a single midventral scale posterior to the insertion of the pelvic fins. Its distribution extends from 18°S to 27°S in the western Atlantic, off the coast of Brazil. This species is found in shallow areas of tropical rocky reefs. The males establish territories of approximately eight square metres. The juveniles have a strong association with seaweed beds where they occasionally mix with Sparisoma radians and Cryptotomus roseus. It grazes on a wide variety of algae growing on rocks and so ingests a large amount of sediment. It can be adaptable in its feeding habits and is frequently seen feeding over Sargassum.
