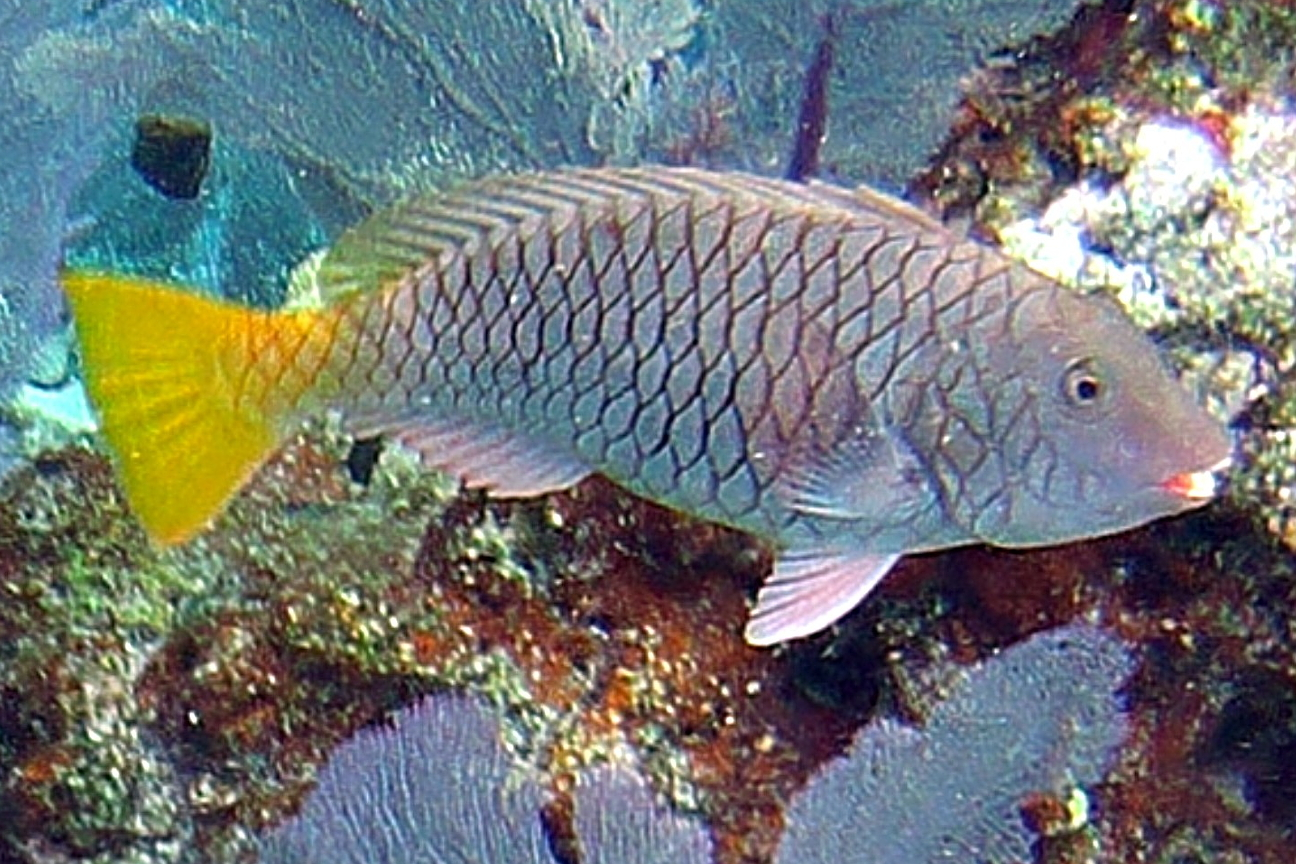

Scientific classification
- Kingdom: Animalia
- Phylum: Chordata
- Class: Actinopterygii
- Order: Labriformes
- Family: Labridae
- Genus: Sparisoma
- Species: S. rubripinne

Binomial name
- Sparisoma rubripinne Valenciennes, 1840

= Sparisoma rubripinne =

Species of parrotfish

Sparisoma rubripinne, which also goes by the common names yellowtail parrotfish or redfin parrotfish is a species of parrotfish in the genus Sparisoma. It can be found in the Western Atlantic Ocean, and is primarily found in the Caribbean Sea.

== Description ==
Sparisoma rubripinne is a medium-sized parrotfish that grows to a maximum length of 47.8 cm. Juveniles and initial-phased adults are a drab silver-tan with a barred pattern on the scales. Additionally, juveniles and initial-phased adults have a bright yellow caudal peduncle and caudal fin. In contrast, terminal phase males are a dull blueish-green with a large black spot on the pectoral fin base.

== Biology ==
Sparisoma rubripinne inhabits coral reefs and seagrass meadows in the Western Atlantic Ocean. Here, it can be found from depths of 1–15 meters deep.
