= Pempheris poeyi =

Conservation status
- Least Concern (IUCN 3.1)

Scientific classification
- Kingdom: Animalia
- Phylum: Chordata
- Class: Actinopterygii
- Order: Acropomatiformes
- Family: Pempheridae
- Genus: Pempheris
- Species: P. poeyi

Binomial name
- Pempheris poeyi Bean, 1885

Species of fish

Pempheris poeyi, the curved sweeper and shortfin sweeper, is a species of marine ray-finned fish, a sweeper in the family Pempheridae from the western Atlantic Ocean.

== Description ==
Pempherus poeyi has a moderately deep, highly compressed body with a straight dorsal profile. It has relatively large eyes and a large oblique mouth. They have 4-5 spines and 8-9 soft rays in their dorsal fins while there are 3 spines, and 22-24 soft rays in the anal fin. They vary in colour from light yellowish brown, slightly duskier dorsally, to blackish on entire upper flanks and tail. There is a horizontal indistinct darkish band along the flanks. It attains a maximum length of 7.2 centimetres (2.8 in) standard length and 15 centimetres (5.9 in) total length.

== Distribution ==
Pempheris poeyi live in the Western Atlantic. This includes the Caribbean Sea, the Lesser Antilles, Colombia, and the island of Bermuda.

== Habitat and biology ==
Pempheris poeyi is nocturnal and spends the day in schools in caves, under ledges, or among dense branching coral. It is known for not having a gas bladder. This species is found at depths between 2 and 20 metres (6.6 and 65.6 ft)It comes out of its sheltering places at night to feed on zooplankton in the water column. The larvae are pelagic.

== Species description and etymology ==
Pempheris poeyi was described by Tarleton Hoffman Bean in 1885, he found the type among specimens collected by Felipe Poey in Cuba and deposited in the United States National Museum. It was in a bottle with Poey's type of P. mülleri and Hoffman named the new species in Poey's honour.
