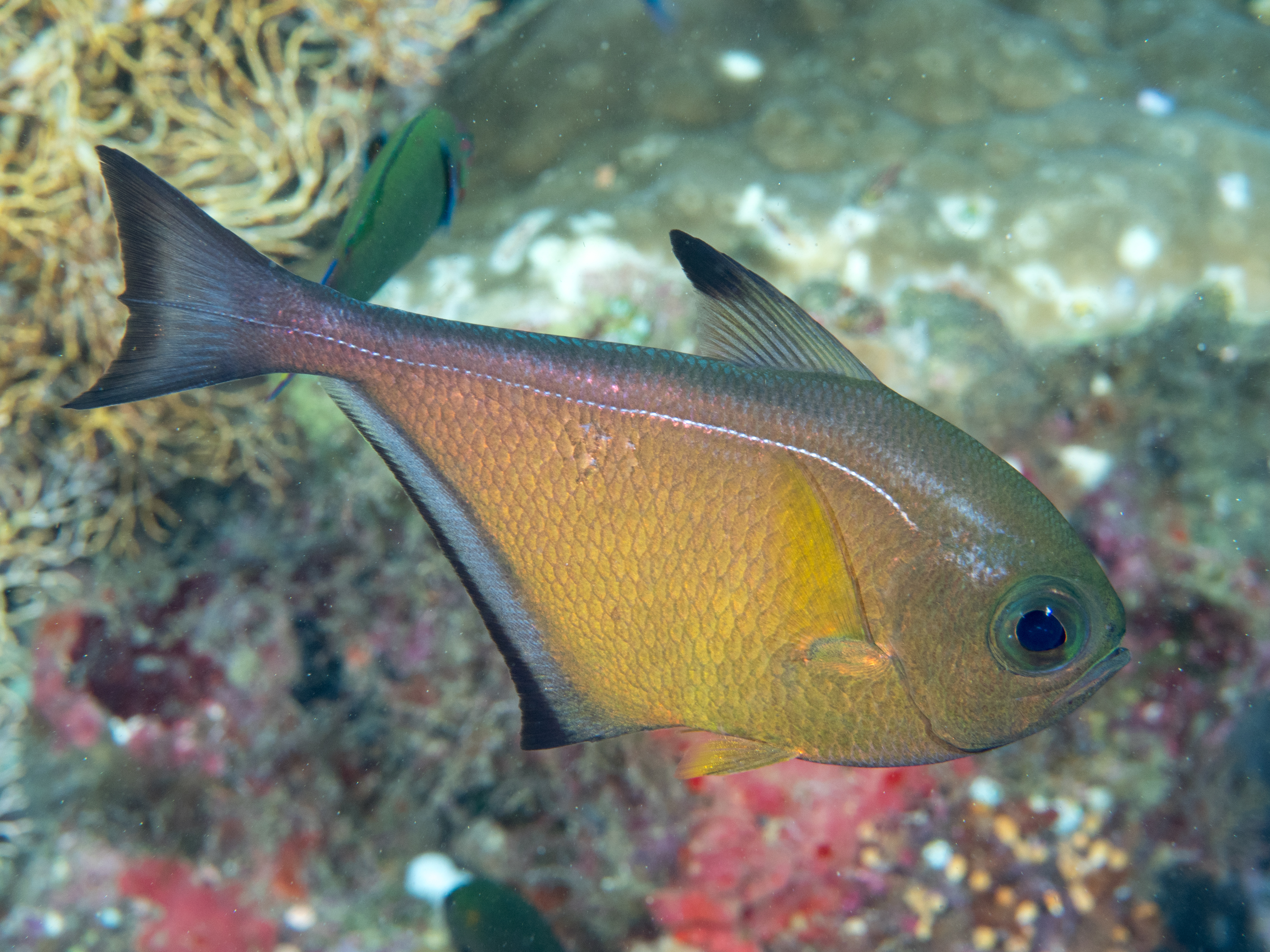

Scientific classification
- Kingdom: Animalia
- Phylum: Chordata
- Class: Actinopterygii
- Order: Acropomatiformes
- Family: Pempheridae
- Genus: Pempheris
- Species: P. vanicolensis

Binomial name
- Pempheris vanicolensis Cuvier, 1831

= Pempheris vanicolensis =

Species of fish

Pempheris vanicolensis, the Vanikoro sweeper or greenback bullseye is a species of Indo-Pacific fish from the family Pempheridae, the sweepers.

== Description ==
Pempheris vanicolensis has a compressed body which is deepest at the origin of the dorsal fin, before it tapers markedly towards the tail, mainly on the ventral side, with a narrow caudal peduncle. It normally has a greenish sheen over the back and most of the head. The anal fin shows an obvious black margin, the tip of the dorsal fin is black, and the pectoral fins are yellow lacking any black markings. The body depth is 2.2-2.4 times the standard length and it grows to up to 20 cm in total length. The dorsal fin has 6 spines and 9 soft rays while the anal fin has 3 spines and 31-43 soft rays.

== Distribution ==
Pempheris vanicolensis has an Indo-Pacific distribution but the precise distribution is subject to some controversy. The distribution of P. vanikolensis sensu stricto is from the Andaman Sea east through the Malay Archipelago to New Guinea and the Solomon Islands where the type specimen was collected at Vanikoro.

== Biology ==
Pempheris vanicolensis occurs in shallow water, normally no deeper than 100m, in tropical and subtropical seas often on coral reefs. It is the host of the intestinal nematode Rhabdochona Indiana. It is found in schools in and around sheltered rocky and coral reefs. It shelters under ledges, in caves, harbours and shipwrecks during the day. It feeds on zooplankton foraging high in the water column during the night.

== Taxonomy ==
Pempheris vanicolensis was named in 1831 by the French zoologist Georges Cuvier from specimens collected in Vanikoro in the south west Pacific Ocean. It was thought to have a wide distribution from the Red Sea to the Solomon Islands and even into the Mediterranean as a Lessepsian migrant but recent work has shown that it does not occur in the Red Sea and that records of this species in the western Indian Ocean are misidentifications of related species.
