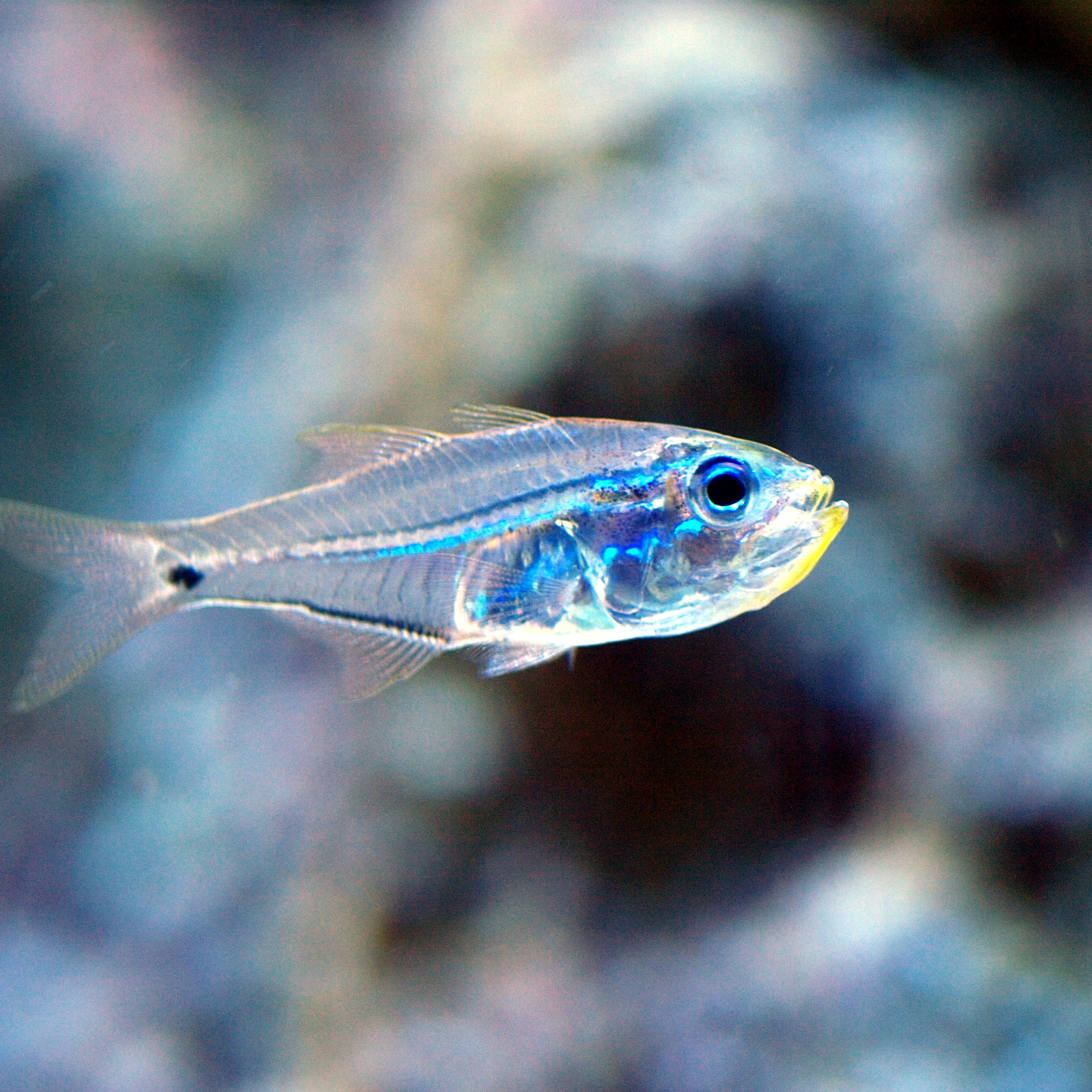
- Parapriacanthus ransonneti

Scientific classification
- Kingdom: Animalia
- Phylum: Chordata
- Class: Actinopterygii
- Order: Acropomatiformes
- Family: Pempheridae
- Genus: Parapriacanthus; Steindachner, 1870

Type species
- Parapriacanthus ransonneti Steindachner, 1870

Synonyms
- Parapempheris von Bonde, 1923; Pempherichthys Klunzinger, 1871

= Parapriacanthus =

Genus of ray-finned fishes

Parapriacanthus is a genus of sweepers native to the Indian Ocean and the western Pacific Ocean. Parapriacanthus are bioluminescent, with ventral light organs for counter-illumination. Parapriacanthus luciferase is a kleptoprotein, obtained from their diet on bioluminescent ostracods.

== Species ==
There are currently 11 recognized species in this genus:

- Parapriacanthus argenteus (von Bonde, 1923)
- Parapriacanthus darros J. E. Randall & Bogorodsky, 2016
- Parapriacanthus dispar (Herre, 1935) (Deep bullseye)
- Parapriacanthus elongatus (McCulloch, 1911) (Slender bullseye)
- Parapriacanthus guentheri (Klunzinger, 1871)
- Parapriacanthus kwazulu J. E. Randall & Bogorodsky, 2016
- Parapriacanthus marei Fourmanoir, 1971 (Red-fin sweeper)
- Parapriacanthus punctulatus J. E. Randall & Bogorodsky, 2016
- Parapriacanthus rahah J. E. Randall & Bogorodsky, 2016
- Parapriacanthus ransonneti Steindachner, 1870 (Pygmy sweeper)
- Parapriacanthus sharm J. E. Randall & Bogorodsky, 2016

== Gallery ==
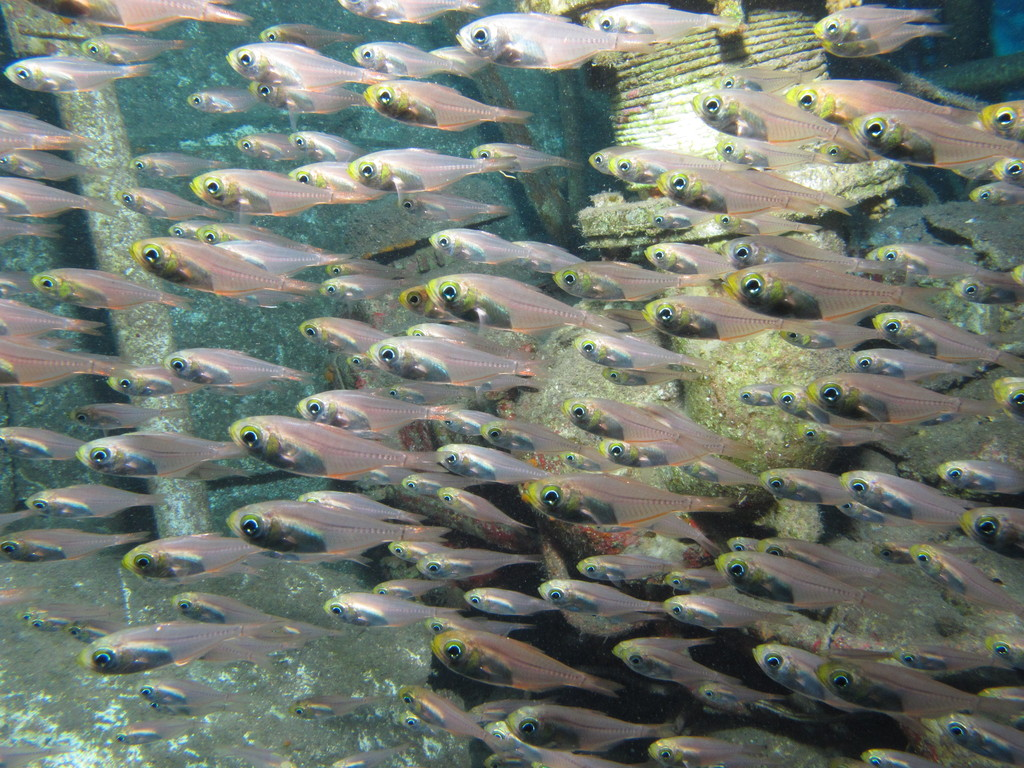
P. guentheri

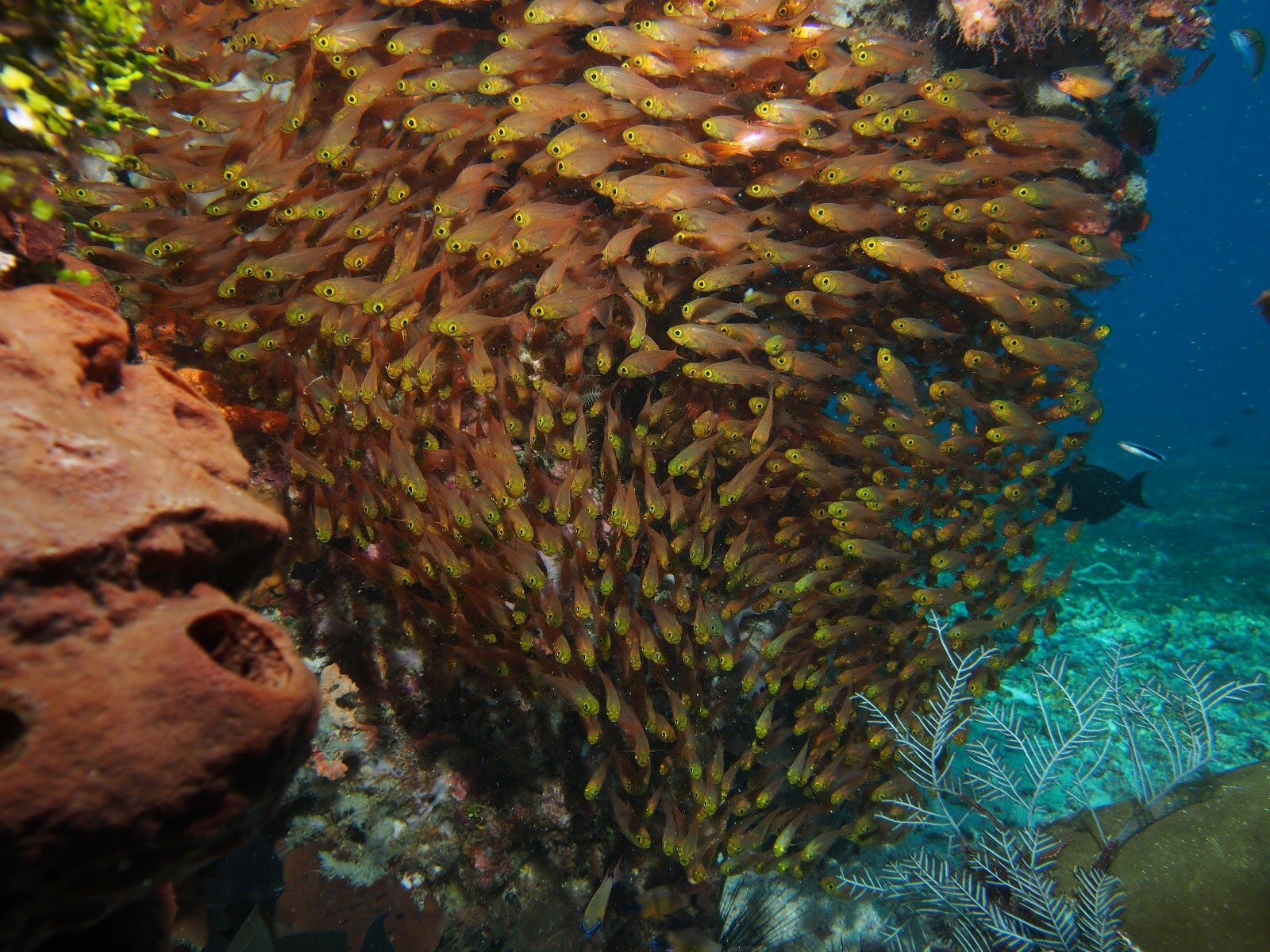
P. ransonneti

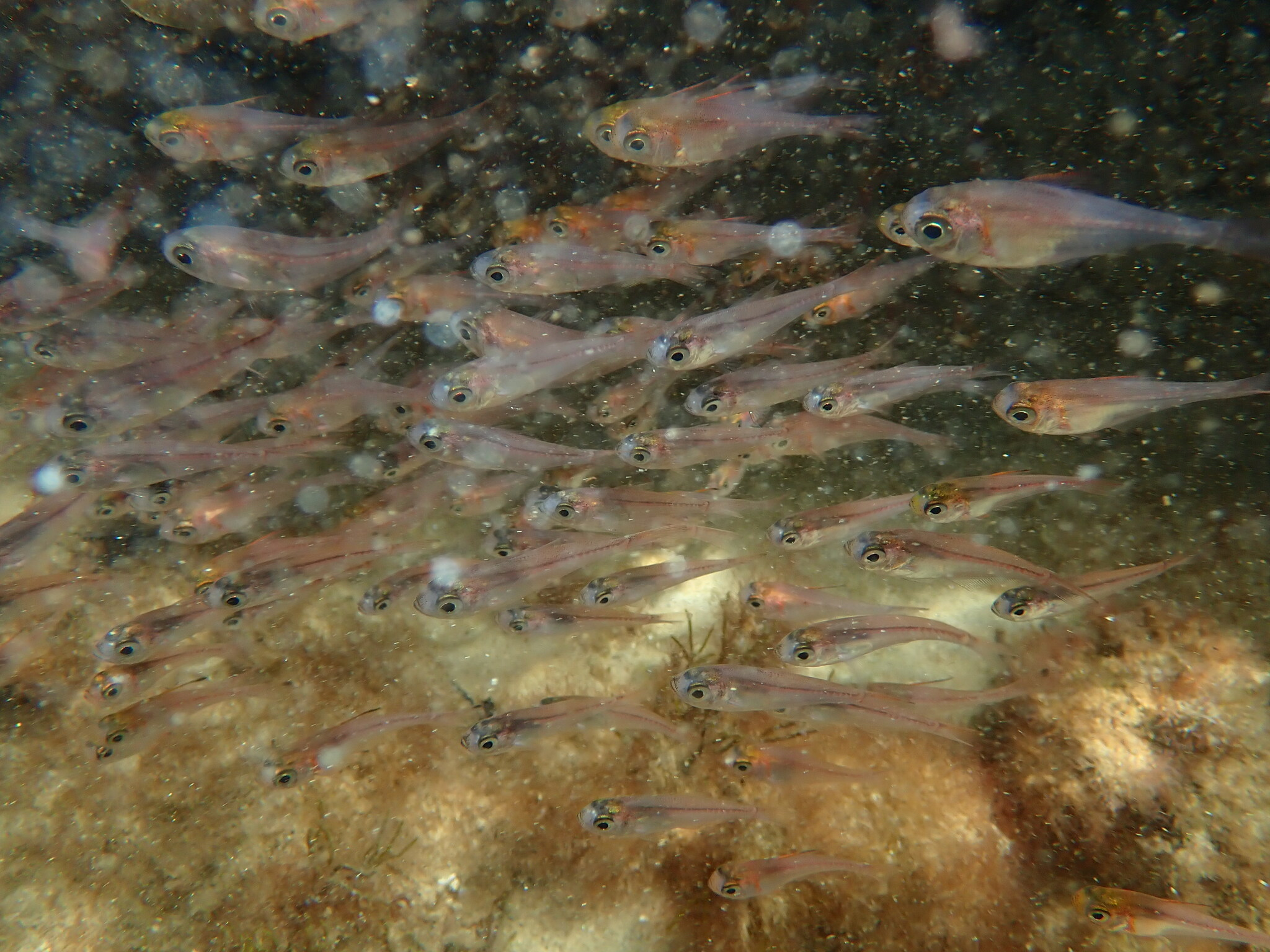
P. elongatus
