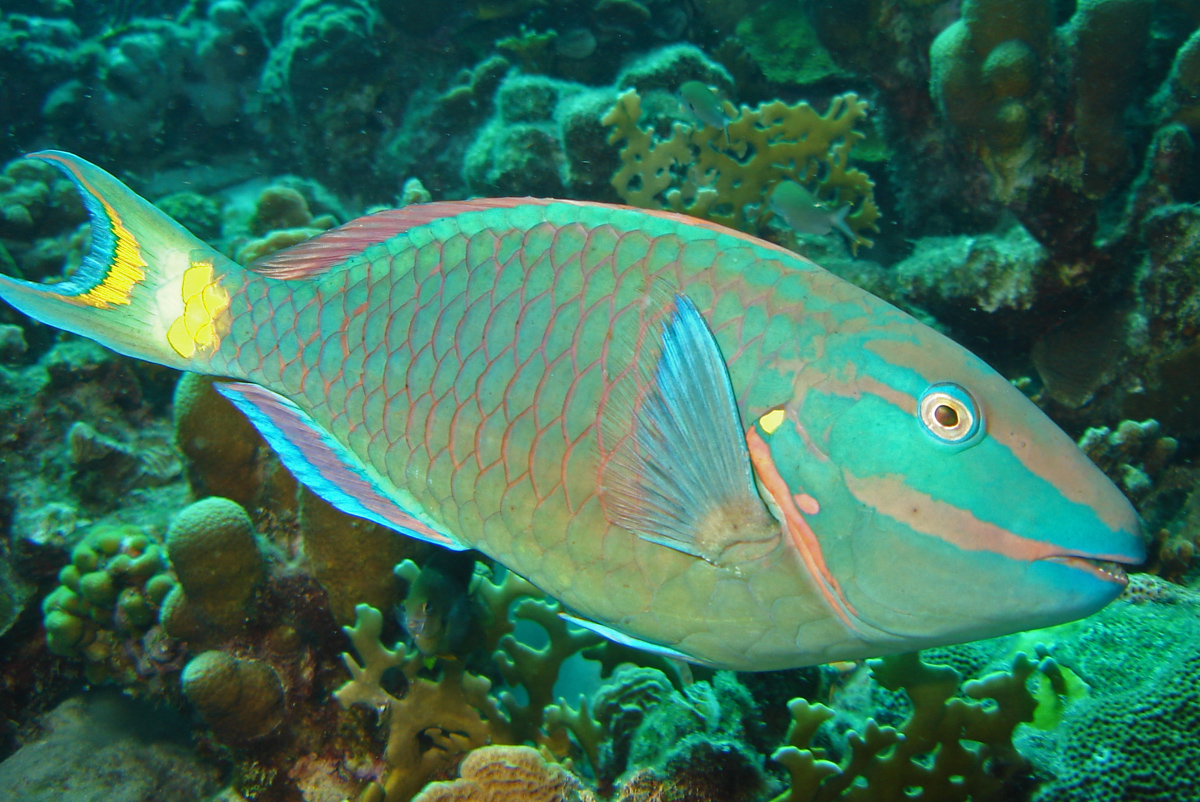

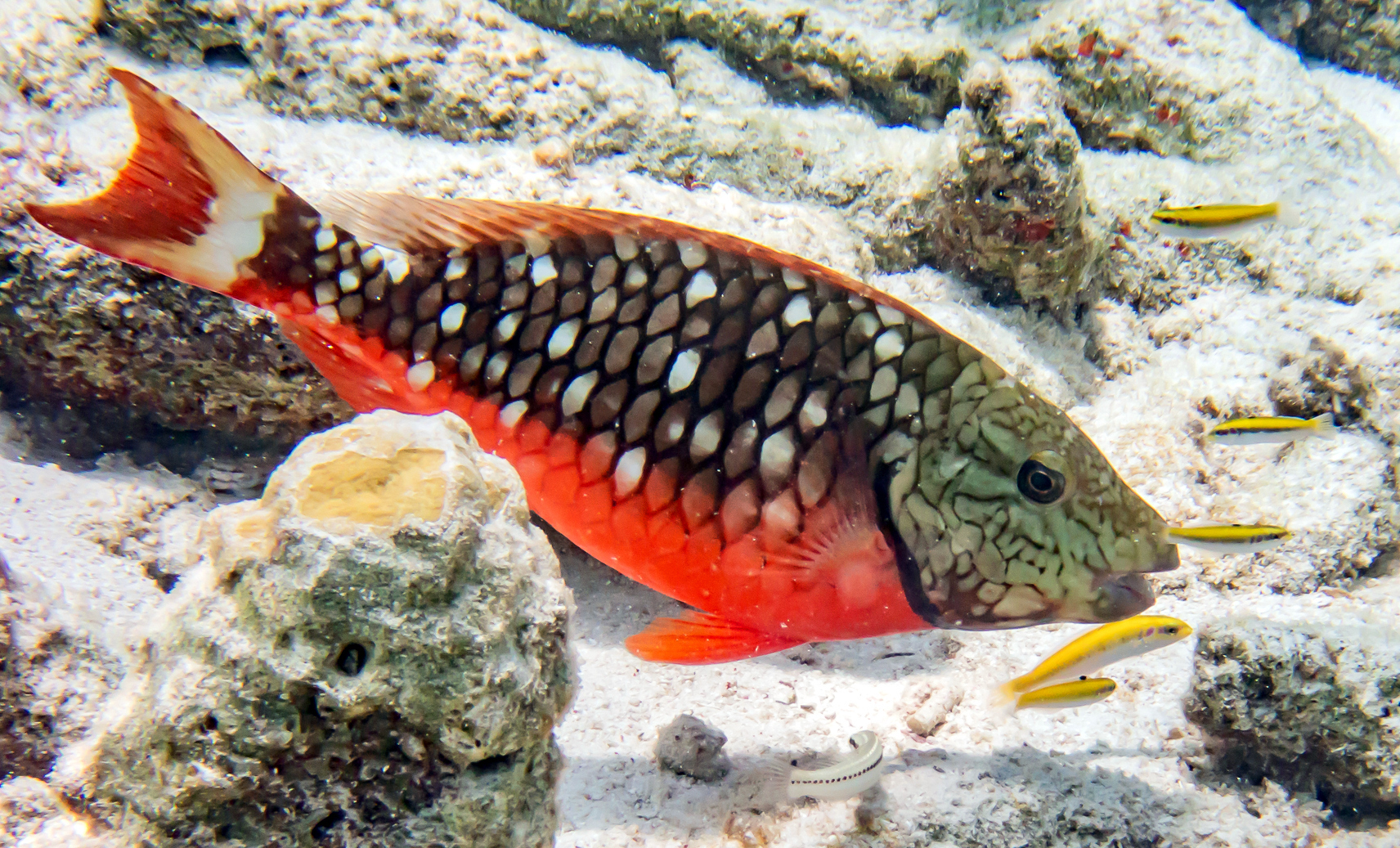
- Terminal phase (top); Initial phase (bottom)

Conservation status
- Least Concern (IUCN 3.1)

Scientific classification
- Kingdom: Animalia
- Phylum: Chordata
- Class: Actinopterygii
- Division: Teleostei
- Order: Labriformes
- Family: Labridae
- Genus: Sparisoma
- Species: S. viride

Binomial name
- Sparisoma viride (Bonnaterre, 1788)

Synonyms
- Scarus viridis Bonnaterre, 1788

= Stoplight parrotfish =

Species of fish

The stoplight parrotfish (Sparisoma viride) is a species of marine ray-finned fish, a parrotfish from the family Scaridae, inhabiting coral reefs in Florida, Caribbean Sea, Gulf of Mexico, Bermuda and as far south as Brazil.

It mainly feeds on algae by scraping and excavating it with its teeth. Like most parrotfish, it is able to change sex.

== Habitat and distribution ==
It is normally found during the day at depths between 15 and 80 ft (5–25 m), but can be found from 10 to 165 ft (3–50 m) The stoplight parrotfish inhabits shallow coral reefs not disturbed by humans in Florida, the Caribbean Sea, Gulf of Mexico, Bermuda and Brazil. They are only active during the day and spend most of their time foraging, swimming, or hovering. At night, they remain hidden under coral boulders. Large individuals typically spend more time swimming and spend a significant amount of time sheltering among crevices, while smaller individuals spend more time hovering. The stoplight parrotfish have a high density in areas of higher algal production. As adults, the stoplight parrotfish are site-attached with limited home ranges.

In the Florida Keys, the stoplight parrotfish were found most frequently in areas with high cover of the macroalgae Dictyota. They have also been found to select for the branching coral Porites porites, however Dictyota are an effective recruitment substrate when branching corals are not available.

Due to its abundance in the Caribbean, the stoplight parrotfish are very ecologically important there.

== Description ==
The common name "stoplight parrotfish" comes from the marked yellow spot near the pectoral fin, which is clearly visible only in specimens in the terminal phase.

Its typical length is between 1 and 1.5 ft (30–45 cm), but it can reach up to 2 ft (64 cm).

== Reproduction ==
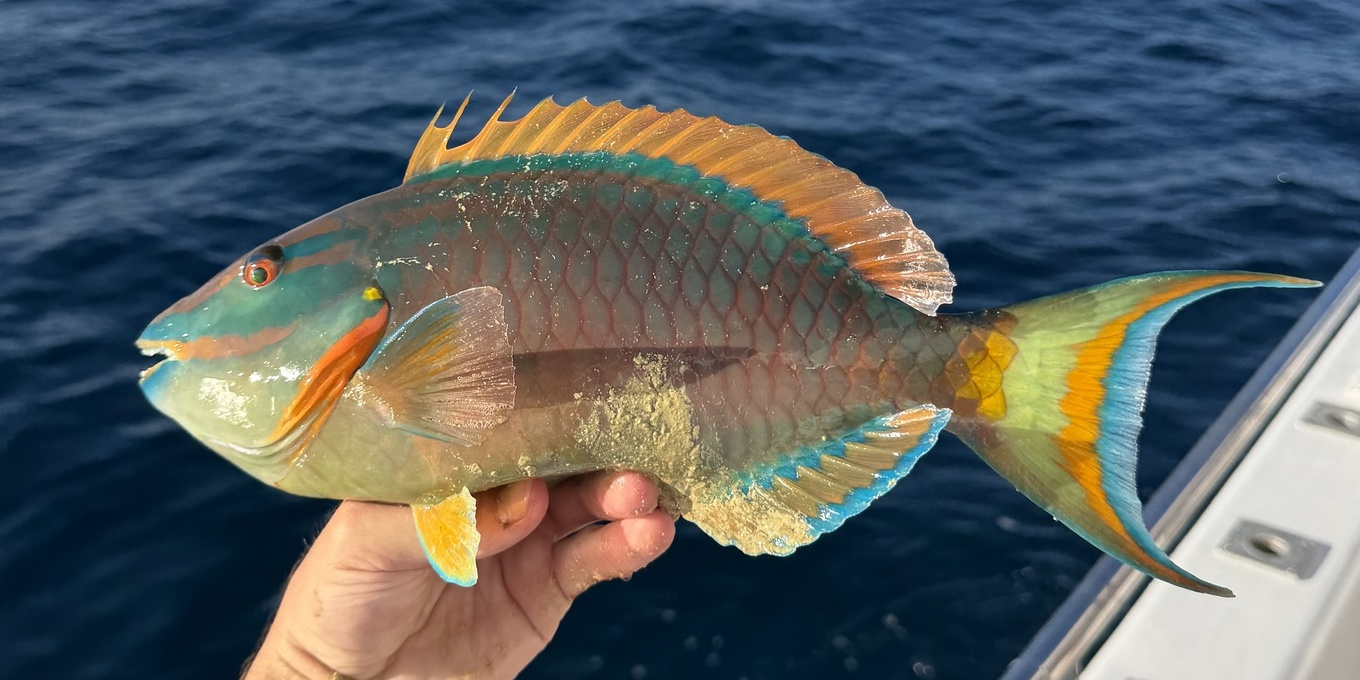
Terminal phase, in Florida

Stoplight parrotfishes engage in reproductive activity throughout the year. They are harem-forming fishes and territorial terminal phase males defend areas that are shared with 1–14 initial phase parrotfishes, with whom they mate. There is more territorial defense in areas with high-quality food. Single terminal phase males also defend the deeper reef from conspecifics.

Stoplight parrotfish males will often control territories containing many sexually mature females to breed with. Males that have territories and those that don't will have vastly different levels of testosterone.

Onshore coral reefs have a greater proportion of older juvenile fish, suggesting that the mortality and/or emigration of adults is more common onshore.Stoplight parrotfishes on offshore coral reefs have a greater average standard length, greater mean asymptotic size, and live twice as long as other fish from onshore coral reefs. Fish onshore were no older than 4 years, while the fish offshore reached 7–8 years. The age difference between offshore and onshore reefs could be due to the stoplight parrotfish migrating from onshore to offshore reefs with age, however, there is no evidence of ontogenetic migration.

=== Sex change ===
The stoplight parrotfish is a protogynous hermaphrodite that shows full sexual dichromatism, meaning that it changes its sex from female to male during its lifespan, and its color changes with its sex change. The sex change is most likely due to the control of hormones, in particular, 11-ketetestosterone (11-KT). The timing of the sex change can vary depending on population density, growth, and mortality rates. Early sex changes may occur if sexually active individuals have a higher mortality rate or have reduced growth rates.

The stoplight parrotfish has 3 life phases: juvenile, initial, and terminal. The colors of the stoplight parrotfish in the initial phase, when it could be either a male or a female, are dramatically different from those in the terminal phase, when it is definitely a male. During the juvenile and initial phase, the parrotfishes are colored brown with a red belly. During the terminal phase, the parrotfishes are a vivid green color with yellow spots on the tail base of their caudal fin. However, some males do not change color at the same time they change sex, therefore becoming female-mimic males (also termed initial phase males). During the initial phase, about 4% of the smaller parrotfish individuals are males.

== Feeding ==
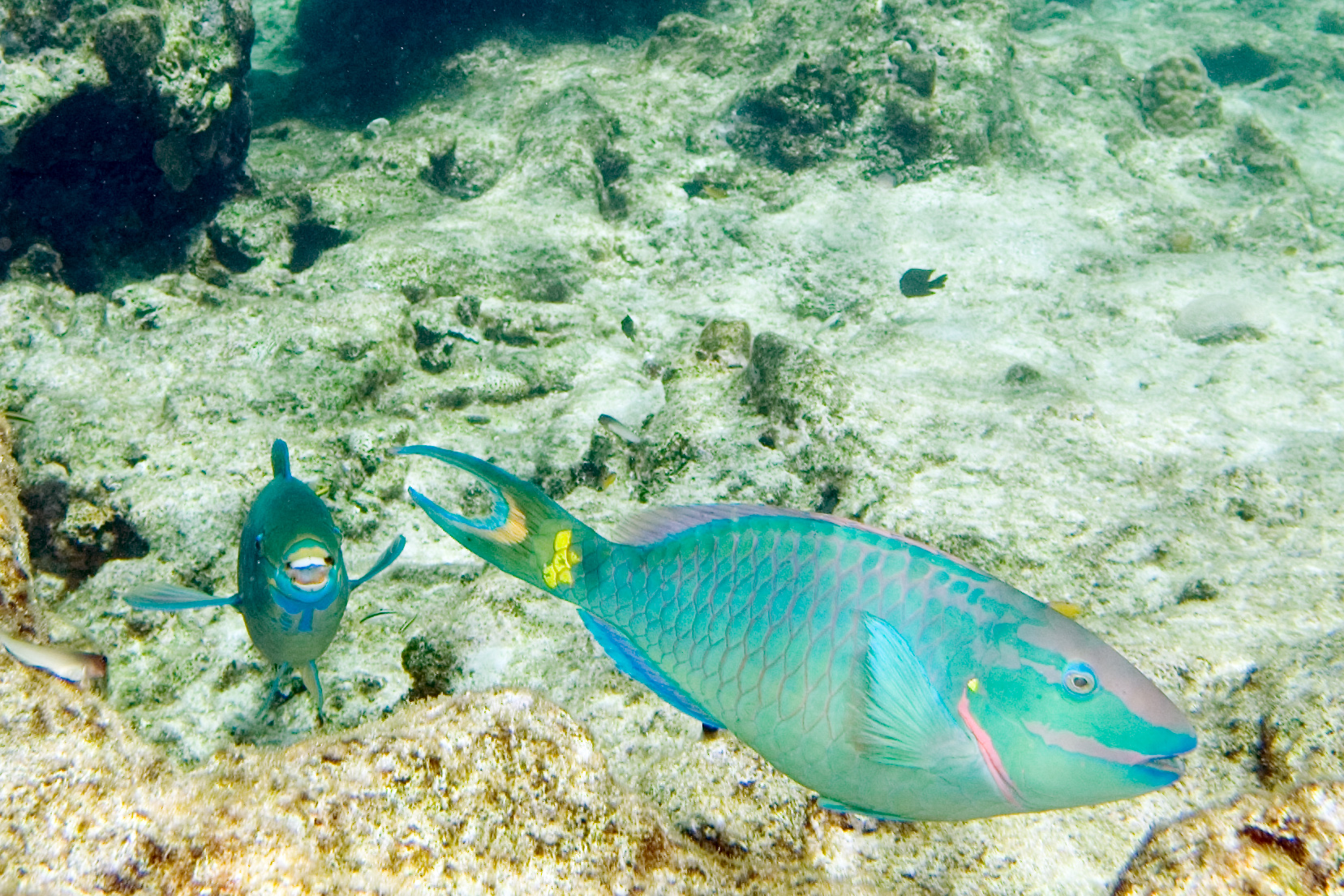
Terminal phase with a queen parrotfish (left), in Bonaire

18th century Mark Catesby illustration of the terminal phase. Labelled as "Psittacus piscis viridis, bahamensisI".

The stoplight parrotfish employs a scraping and excavating grazing mode and feeds almost exclusively on algae that are associated with dead coral substrates. They have higher grazing rates and assimilation efficiencies in areas with high-quality food.

Their preferred food types are large, sparse turfs growing on carbonate substrates that are inhibited by endolithic algae. Algae have high levels of proteins, a high energetic value, along with a high yield, making it preferable to the stoplight parrotfish. As facultative corallivores, adult fish will occasionally feed on living corals (mainly Montastrea annularis). In healthy coral reef environments, the detriment of coral-feeding by parrotfish tends to be offset by the benefits of their algal feeding. In declining coral reefs, however, corallivory by parrotfish may act synergystically with other stressors to depress coral growth and recovery. Crutose corallines are not preferred, whether or not they do or do not have algal turf.

Their foraging strategy is called "search and nip" and they spend short bouts of energy on swimming, feeding, and hovering.
