= Luiz A. Rocha =

Brazilian-American Ichthyologist

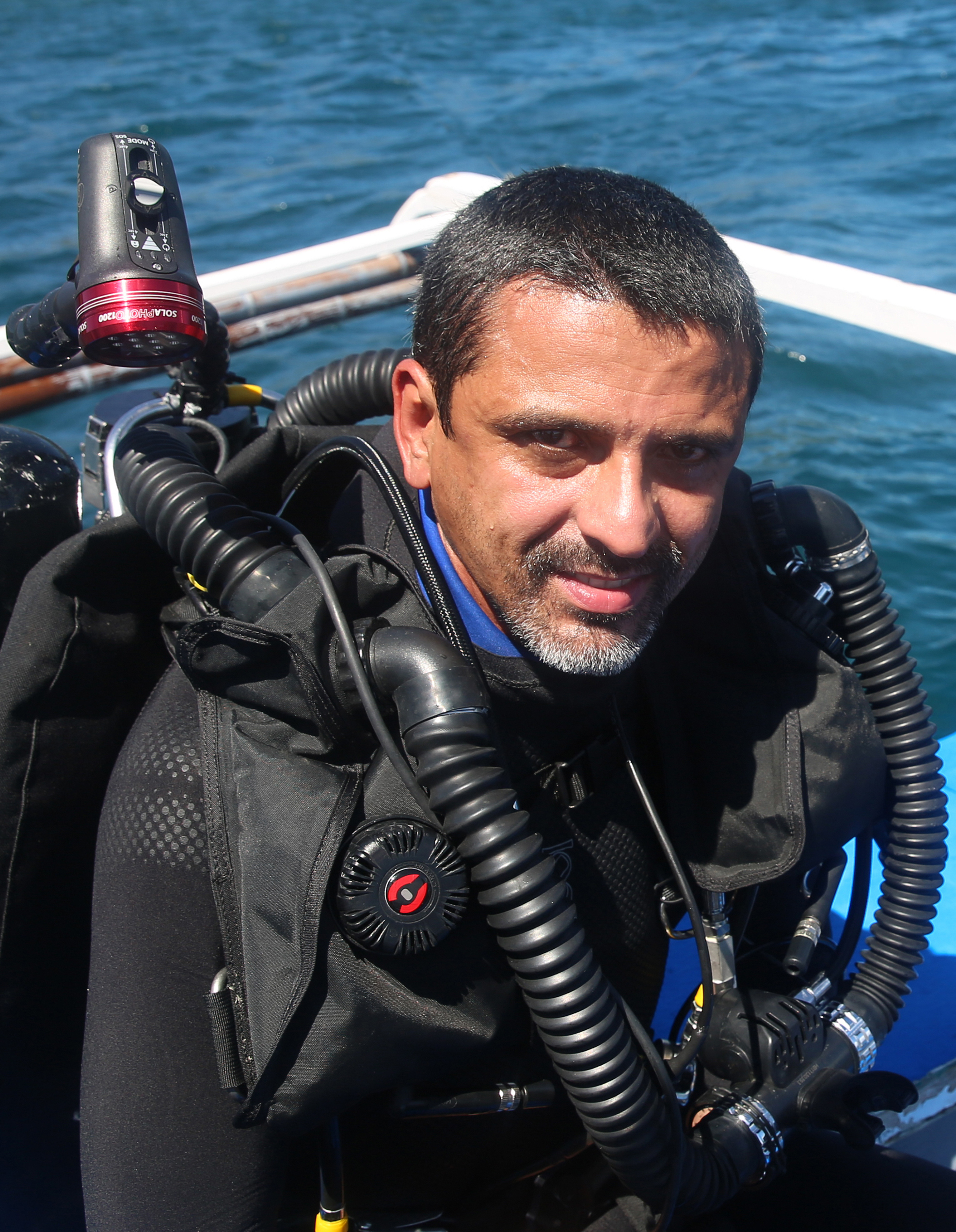
- Born: João Pessoa, Brazil
- Citizenship: American
- Education: University of Florida; Federal University of Paraiba
- Scientific career
- Fields: Ichthyology; Marine conservation Evolutionary biology
- Workplaces: California Academy of Sciences
- Thesis: Ecology, the Amazon barrier, and speciation in western Atlantic Halichoeres (Labridae). (2003)
- Doctoral advisor: Brian Bowen

Luiz Alves Rocha is the Curator and Follett Chair of Ichthyology at the California Academy of Sciences. He is also an adjunct professor at the University of California Santa Cruz and San Francisco State University.

== Education ==
Rocha has obtained a PhD in Fisheries and Aquatic Sciences from the University of Florida, and a BS in Biology and Masters in Zoology from the Federal University of Paraiba in Brazil. He also conducted post-doctoral work at the Smithsonian Tropical Research Institute and the University of Hawaii.

== Career ==
Rocha has authored one book and more than 150 scientific articles. He is best known for his work in speciation in coral reef fishes using advanced genomic methodologies to understand fish evolution, and more recently has been actively exploring the diversity of deep (mesophotic) coral reefs throughout the tropics.

He has also published an opinion piece in the New York Times about the problems associated with the creation of large marine protected areas in the open ocean, and has evaluated the conservation status of hundreds of species for the IUCN Red List, including the endangered Social Wrasse.

== Taxon named in his honor ==
- The Parrotfish Sparisoma rocha Pinheiro, Gasparini & I. Sazima, 2010 and
- The Sweeper fish Rocha's sweeper Pempheris rochai J. E. Randall & Victor, 2015 were named in Rocha's honor for his contributions to ichthyology.

== Honors and awards ==
In 2019 he won the inaugural Margaret M. Stewart Achievement Award for Excellence in Ichthyology or Herpetology for his scientific contributions and scholarly impacts on the field of ichthyology. In 2024, he was an awardee and inductee into the Explorers Club 50 (EC50).

== Taxon described by him ==
- See Category:Taxa named by Luiz A. Rocha
