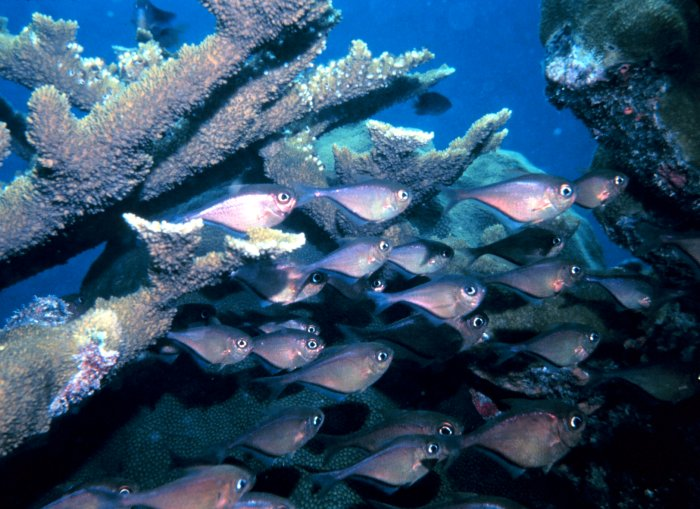
- Glassy sweepers (Pempheris schomburgkii)

Scientific classification
- Kingdom: Animalia
- Phylum: Chordata
- Class: Actinopterygii
- Order: Acropomatiformes
- Family: Pempheridae; Bleeker, 1859

Genera
- seetext

= Sweeper =

Pempheridae

Family of ray-finned fishes

Sweepers are small, tropical marine (occasionally brackish) ray-finned fish of the family Pempheridae. Found in the western Atlantic Ocean and Indo-Pacific region, the family contains about 80 species in two genera. One species (Pempheris xanthoptera) is the target of subsistence fisheries in Japan, where the fish is much enjoyed for its taste. Sweepers are occasionally kept in marine aquaria.

== Description ==
Deeply keeled, compressed bodies and large eyes typify sweepers, their form somewhat like hatchetfish; both cycloid and ctenoid scales may be present. The small, short dorsal fin begins before the body's midpoint and may have four to seven spines; the anal fin is extensive and usually has three spines. The mouth is subterminal and strongly oblique. Species of the genus Parapriacanthus have much more cylindrical bodies.

Some species possess photophores. All but the curved sweeper (Pempheris poeyi) possess a gas bladder. The largest species is the common bullseye (Pempheris multiradiata) at 28 cm (11 in) long; most other species measure 16 cm (6.3 in) or less. Colouration is relatively subdued.

== Behaviour ==
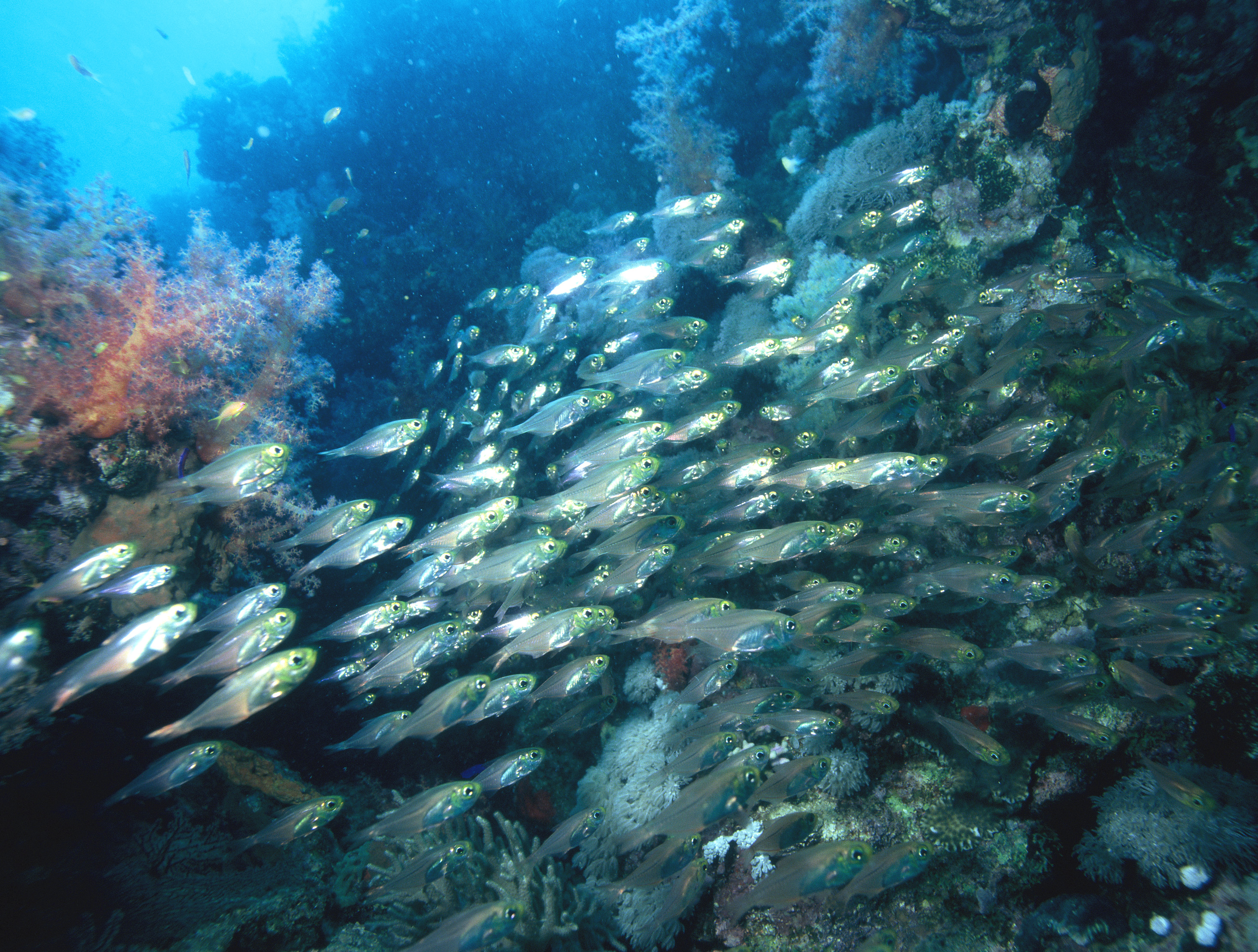
Red Sea dwarf sweepers (Parapriacanthus guentheri)

Characteristically shallow water, schooling fish (especially as juveniles), sweepers are nocturnal and seek shelter under ledges or in the caves, nooks, and crannies of reefs or eroded, rocky shorelines during the day. They are often found sharing these hiding places with cardinalfishes and bigeyes, also nocturnal species. At night, sweepers forage for zooplankton, their primary food.

At least one species, the small-scale bullseye (Pempheris compressa) of Australia, is known to enter coastal estuaries whilst young.

== Genera ==
The following genera are classified within the family Pempheridae:

- Parapriacanthus Steindachner, 1870
- Pempheris Cuvier, 1829
