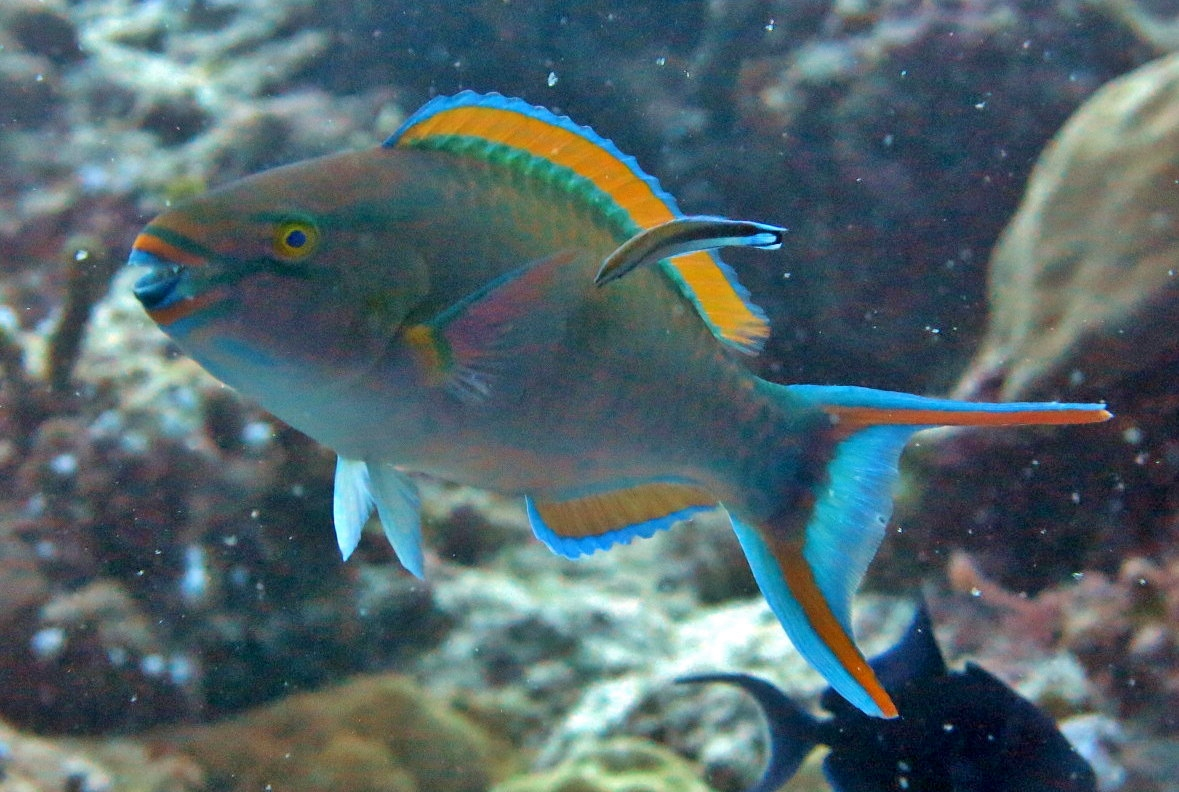

Conservation status
- Least Concern (IUCN 3.1)

Scientific classification
- Kingdom: Animalia
- Phylum: Chordata
- Class: Actinopterygii
- Order: Labriformes
- Family: Labridae
- Genus: Scarus
- Species: S. tricolor

Binomial name
- Scarus tricolor Bleeker, 1847

Synonyms
- Callyodon tricolor (Bleeker, 1847); Scarus cyanognathos Bleeker, 1847; Callyodon elerae Jordan & Seale, 1907; Callyodon latifasciatus Seale & Bean, 1907; Callyodon viridibusius Fowler & Bean, 1928; Callyodon mus J. L. B. Smith, 1956; Callyodon urbanus J. L. B. Smith, 1959

= Scarus tricolor =

Species of fish

Scarus tricolor, also known as the tri-colour parrotfish or three-coloured parrotfish, is a species of marine ray-finned fish, a parrotfish, in the family Scaridae. It has a wide Indo-Pacific distribution.

== Description ==
Scarus tricolor is a greenish parrotfish which normally shows pinkish or yellowish tints on the posterior portion of its body and a purplish band just inside the margin of each lobe of the caudal fin. The females are dark grey to almost black shading to blue to bluish-green on the lower flanks, with black edging to the scales, a red tail fin, an orange anal fin and sooty yellowish to orange pelvic fins. The terminal phase males are similar to those of Scarus forsteni, the most notable difference being that S. tricolor has a yellow inner pectoral axil.

== Distribution ==
Scarus tricolor is a widespread species in the Indian Ocean where it ranges from East Africa south to KwaZulu-Natal, South Africa and east through Madagascar and the other tropical Indian Ocean archipelagoes through the eastern Indian Ocean into the western pacific Ocean as far east as French Polynesia and Pitcairn. It is largely replaced by S. forsteni in the western Pacific although there is some overlap in the Philippines.

== Habitat and biology ==
Scarus tricolor can be usually be found as individuals, although groups are sometimes recorded, in area where there is a dense growth of coral, normally on seaward reefs but also within lagoons. It occurs to depths of 30 metres (98 ft) and it feeds on benthic algae. It is an oviparous species which forms distinct pairs for spawning.
