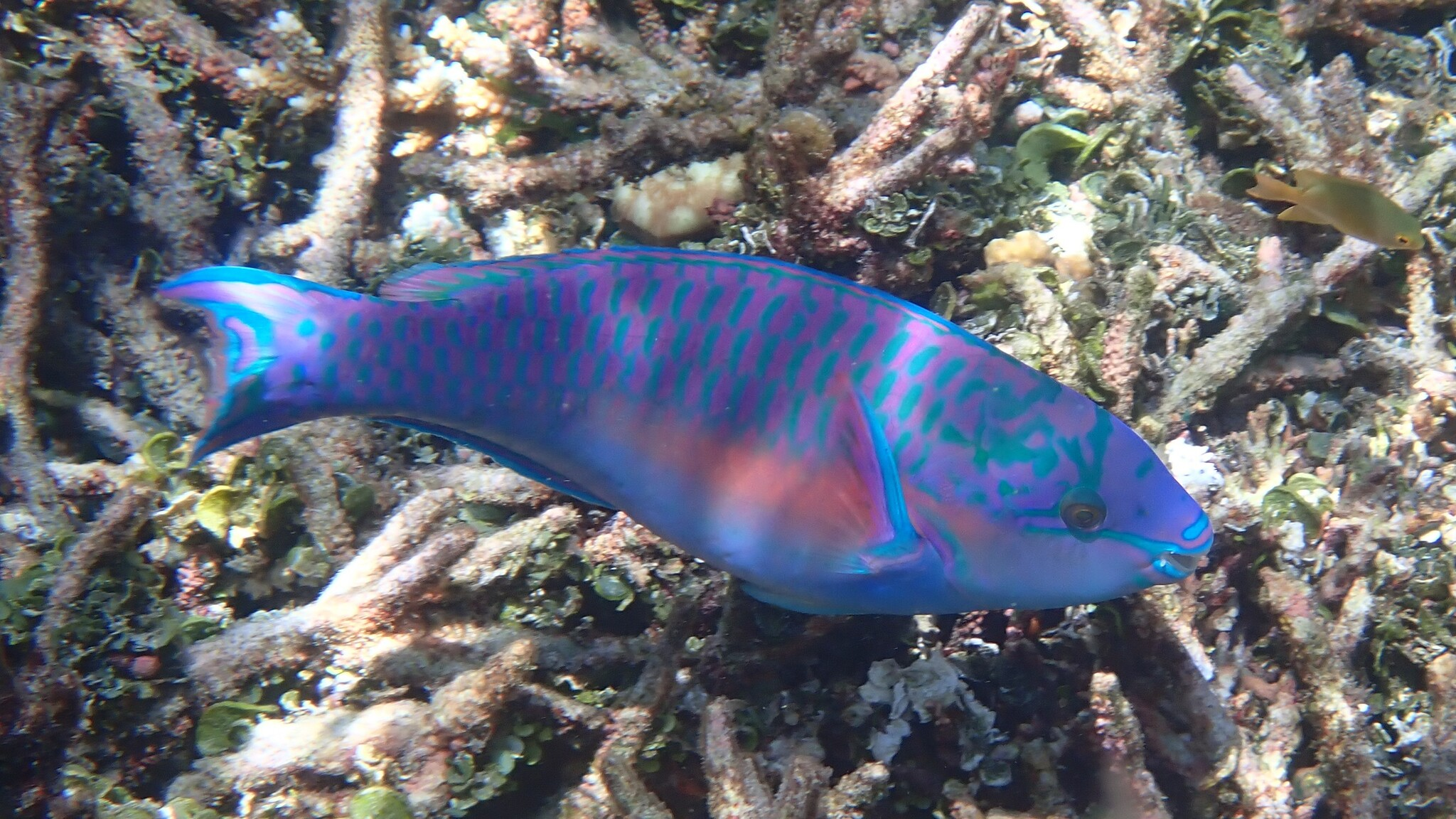
- Terminal phase, in Indonesia

Conservation status
- Least Concern (IUCN 3.1)

Scientific classification
- Kingdom: Animalia
- Phylum: Chordata
- Class: Actinopterygii
- Division: Teleostei
- Order: Labriformes
- Family: Labridae
- Genus: Scarus
- Species: S. chameleon

Binomial name
- Scarus chameleon Choat & Randall, 1986

= Scarus chameleon =

Species of fish

Scarus chameleon, commonly known as the chameleon parrotfish, is a species of marine fish in the subfamily Scarinae. It inhabits reefs in the Pacific and eastern Indian Ocean. It is named after its ability to rapidly change colouration.

== Taxonomy ==
Until 1986, it was misidentified as Scarus lunula, a synonym of Scarus festivus. It is similar in appearance to S. festivus, which is its closest relative and overlaps with it in distribution. The type locality is Sumilon Island in the Philippines.

== Description ==
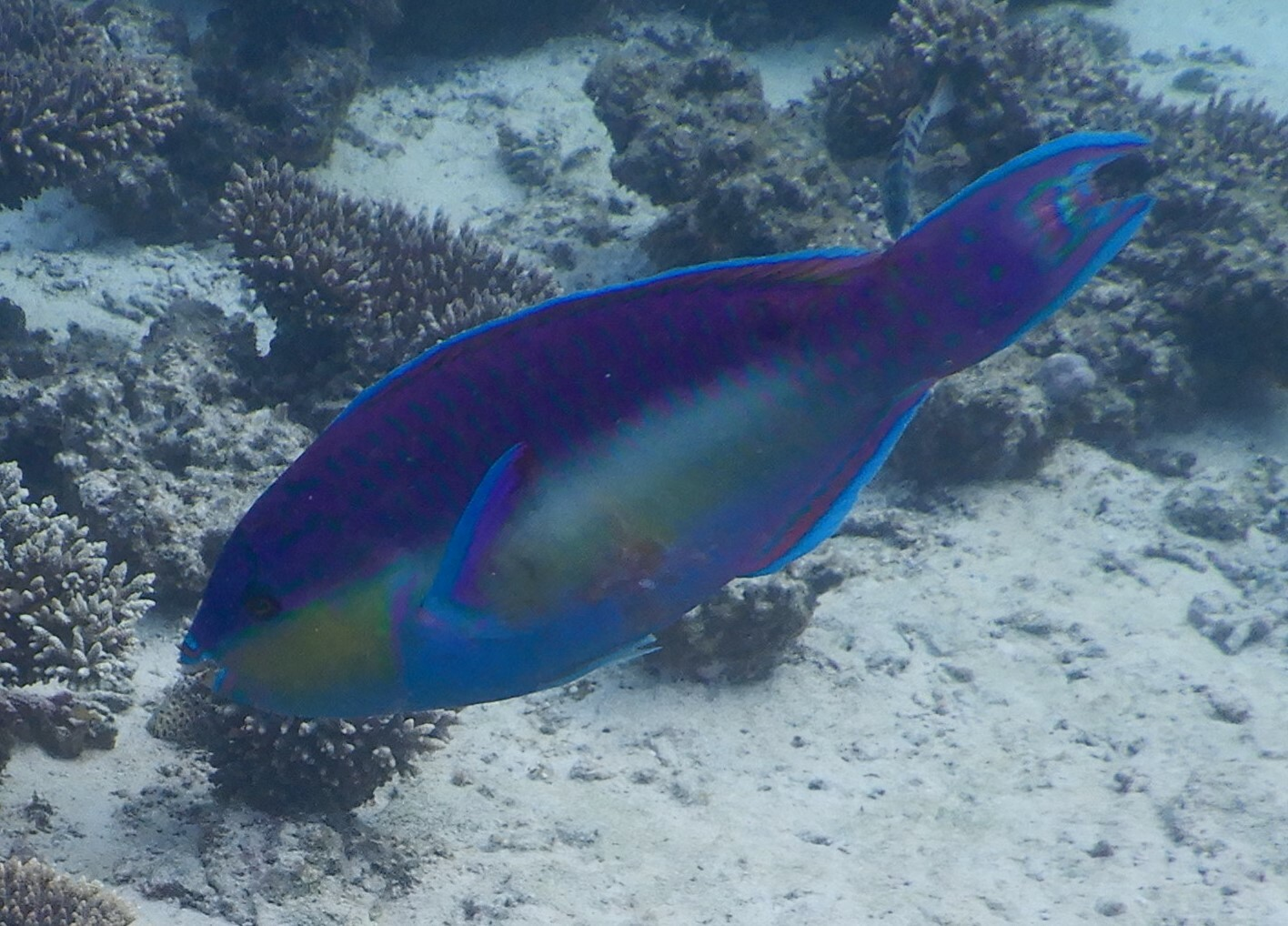
Dark form terminal phase, in Western Australia

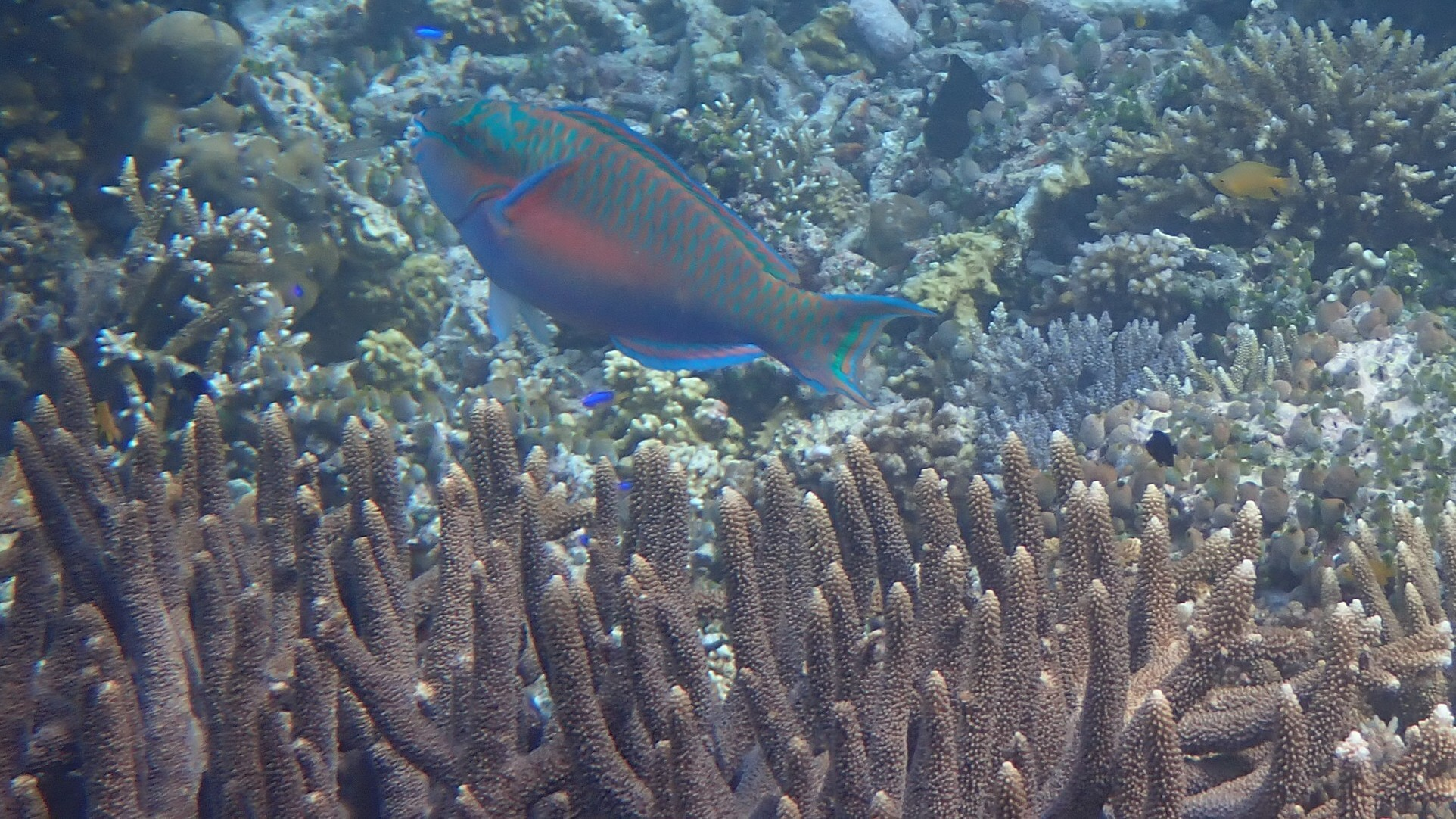
Light form terminal phase, in Indonesia

The species is known to reach 248 mm (9.8 in) SL. Females may be sexually mature by the time they reach 115 mm (4.5 in) SL. Females may be as small as 149.5 mm (5.89 in) SL before transitioning into terminal phase males, but female as large as 175.5 mm (6.91 in) SL are known.

Like most parrotfish, S. chameleon changes colour phase as it grows. The young juveniles, initial phase, and terminal phases of S. chameleon are all highly variable in colouration and able to rapidly change colouration, which is a challenge when attempting to identifying it. The initial phase includes females and primary males, and may appear very similar to northern and inshore populations of the closely related and more common S. rivulatus. The secondary males of the terminal phase are more distinct, but such terminal phase fish can change rapidly colours between light and dark coloured liveries.
