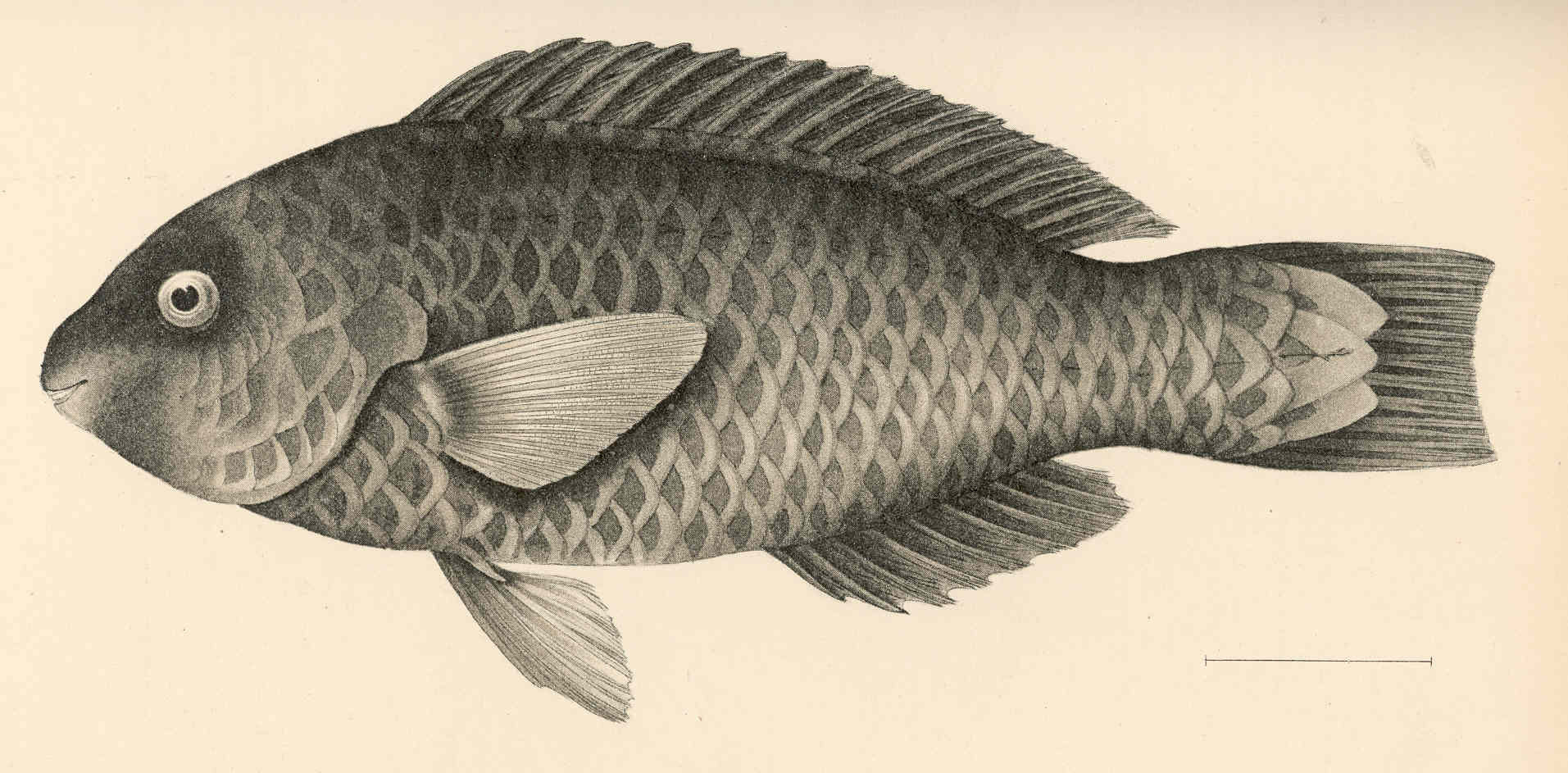

Scientific classification
- Kingdom: Animalia
- Phylum: Chordata
- Class: Actinopterygii
- Order: Labriformes
- Family: Labridae
- Genus: Scarus
- Species: S. dubius

Binomial name
- Scarus dubius E. T. Bennett, 1828

= Scarus dubius =

Species of fish

Scarus dubius, also known as regal parrotfish, is a parrotfish endemic to the Hawaiian Islands.

== Description ==
The Hawaiian regal parrotfish grows to a maximum length of 35.6 cm. Both male and female regal parrotfish have similar elongated, oval-shaped bodies. The males and females often display different color patterns and intensities. The males are usually more colorful than the females. The male's coloration can include a mix of vibrant blues, oranges, yellows, and greens. In contrast, the females are going to be more dull, expressing shades of green, blue, or brown, and may lack the prominent patterns seen in males.

The regal parrotfish produces slimy secretions similar to those of some teleost fish. This slime is produced from goblet cells in the opercular region during the night, leading to the creation of cocoons around their bodies. Researchers have proposed that this is a defense mechanism against predators.

== Distribution and habitat ==
Within the Northwestern Hawaiian Islands, the regal parrotfish is found in abundance at depths ≥ 6 meters. As a non-aquarium fish, the regal parrotfish has been found in reef and aggregate coral habitats and reef, and colonized volcanic boulder habitat types. Around Oahu, the regal parrotfish has an estimated abundance of 72,140 ± 32.571 and a biomass of 3901 ± 1653 kg.
