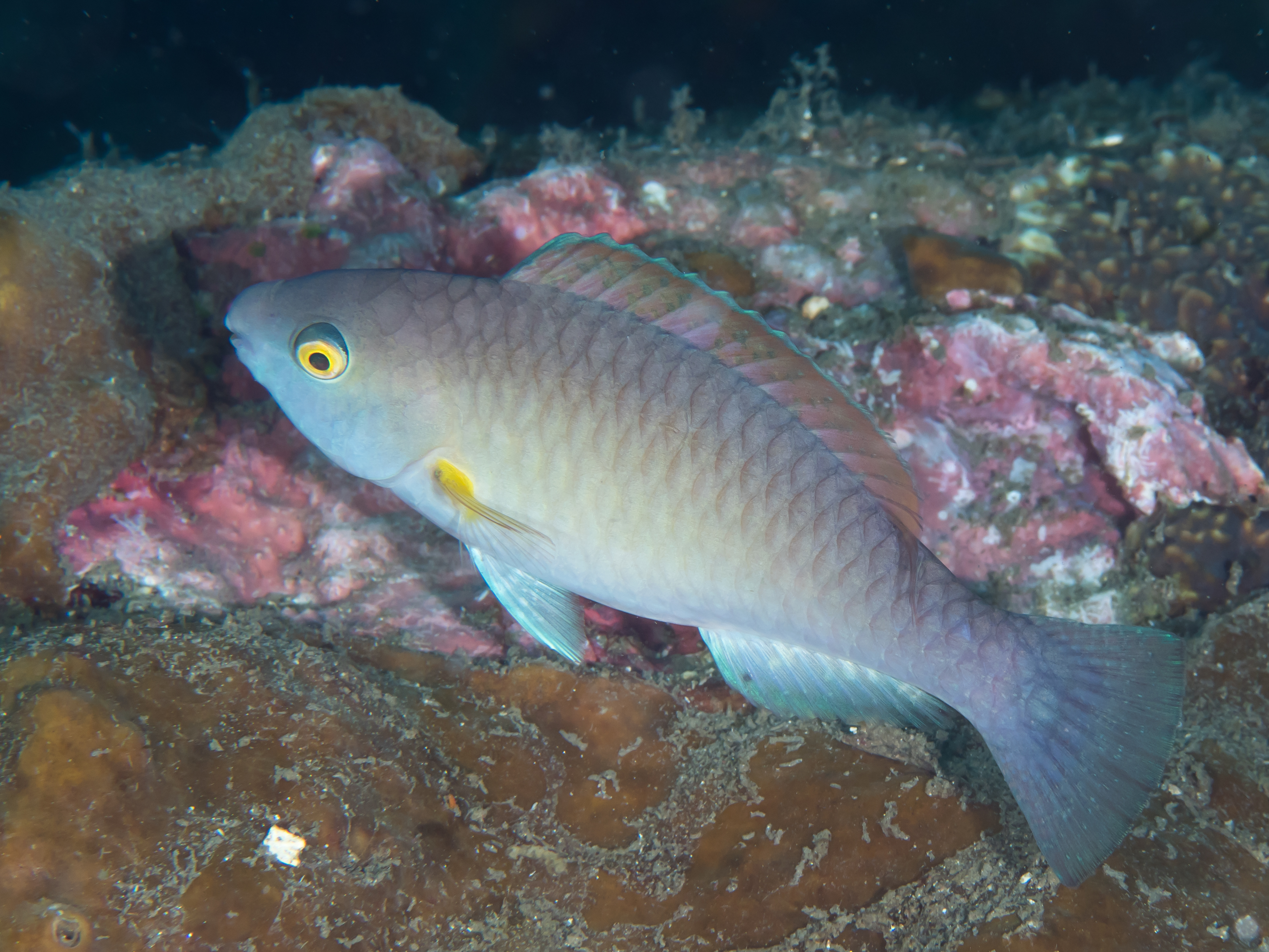

Conservation status
- Least Concern (IUCN 3.1)

Scientific classification
- Kingdom: Animalia
- Phylum: Chordata
- Class: Actinopterygii
- Order: Labriformes
- Family: Labridae
- Genus: Scarus
- Species: S. flavipectoralis

Binomial name
- Scarus flavipectoralis Schultz, 1958

= Scarus flavipectoralis =

Species of fish

Scarus flavipectoralis, the yellow-fin parrotfish, also known as the king parrotfish, is a species of marine ray-finned fish, a parrotfish in the family Scaridae. It is found in the western Central Pacific from the Philippines east to the Solomon Islands, north to the Marshall Islands and south to Scott Reef and the Great Barrier Reef, it has also been recorded from Tonga.
