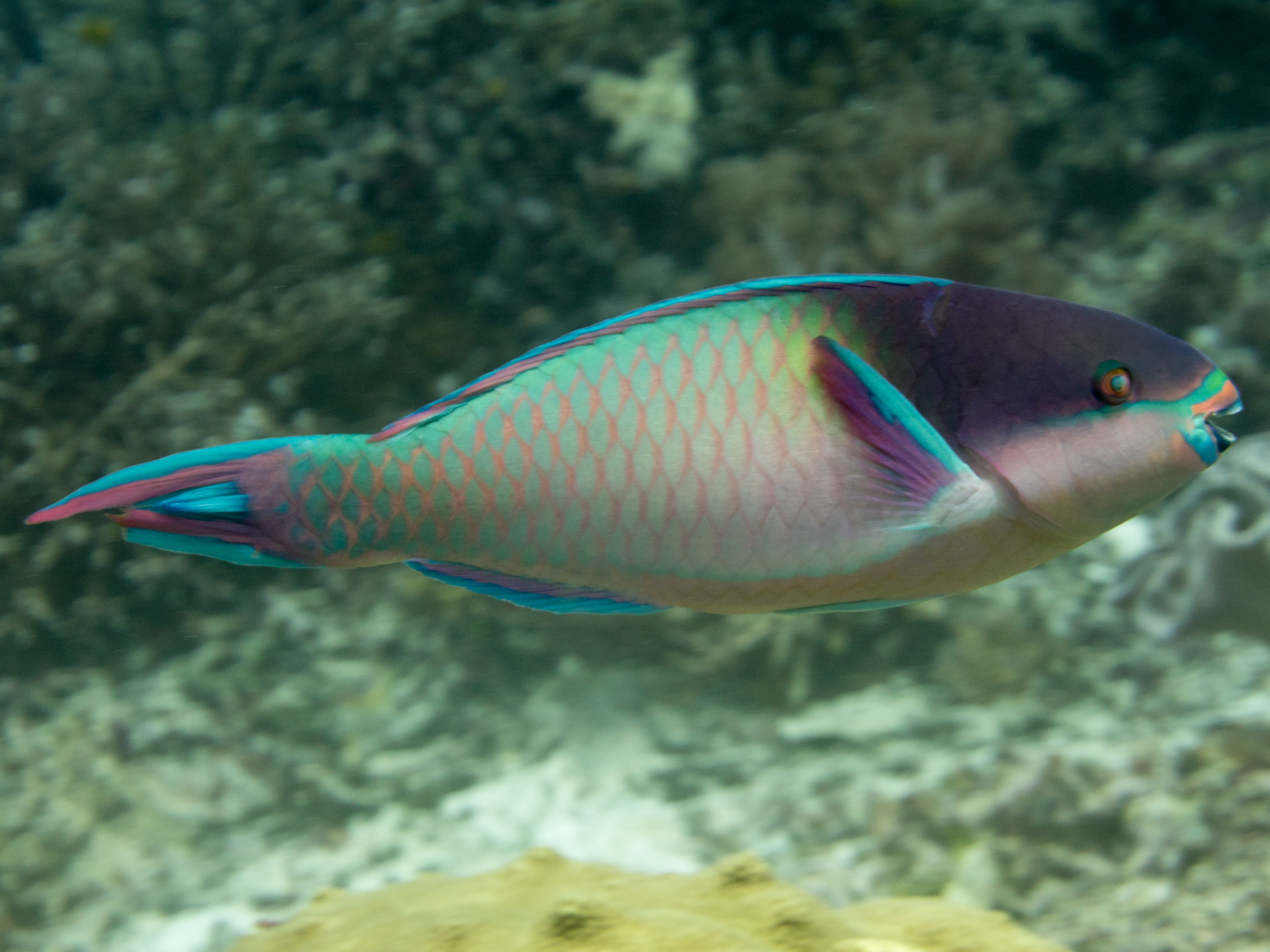

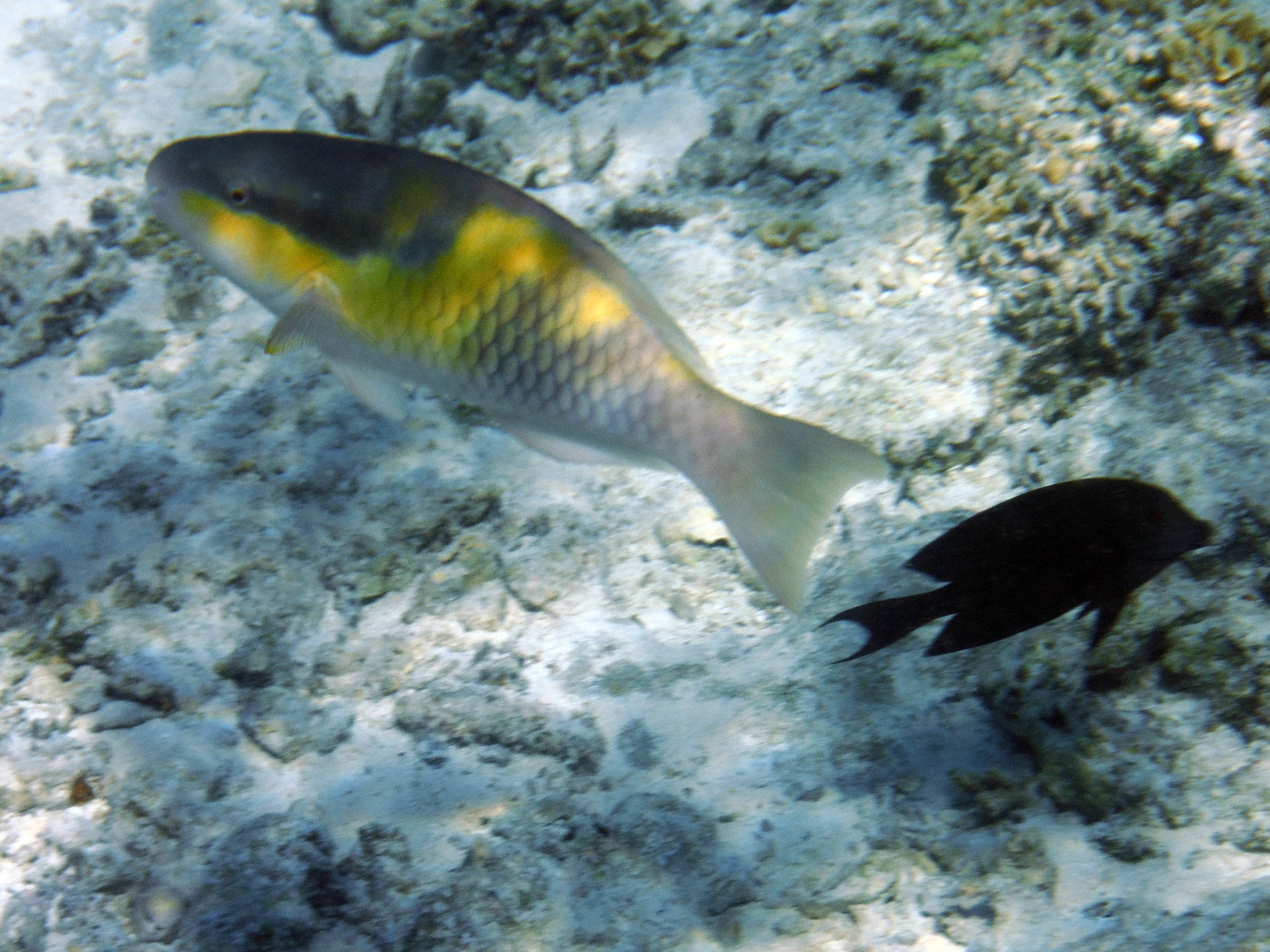

Conservation status
- Least Concern (IUCN 3.1)

Scientific classification
- Kingdom: Animalia
- Phylum: Chordata
- Class: Actinopterygii
- Order: Labriformes
- Family: Labridae
- Genus: Scarus
- Species: S. oviceps

Binomial name
- Scarus oviceps Valenciennes, 1840

= Dark-capped parrotfish =

Species of fish

The dark-capped parrotfish (Scarus oviceps), also known as the blue parrotfish, egghead parrotfish or yellow-barred parrotfish is a species of marine ray-finned fish in the family Scaridae. This species inhabits coral reefs in the Indo-Pacific from Mauritius in the east to the Tuamotus and the Line Islands in the west, north to the Ryukyu Islands, Japan and south to Shark Bay, Western Australia and the Great Barrier Reef.
