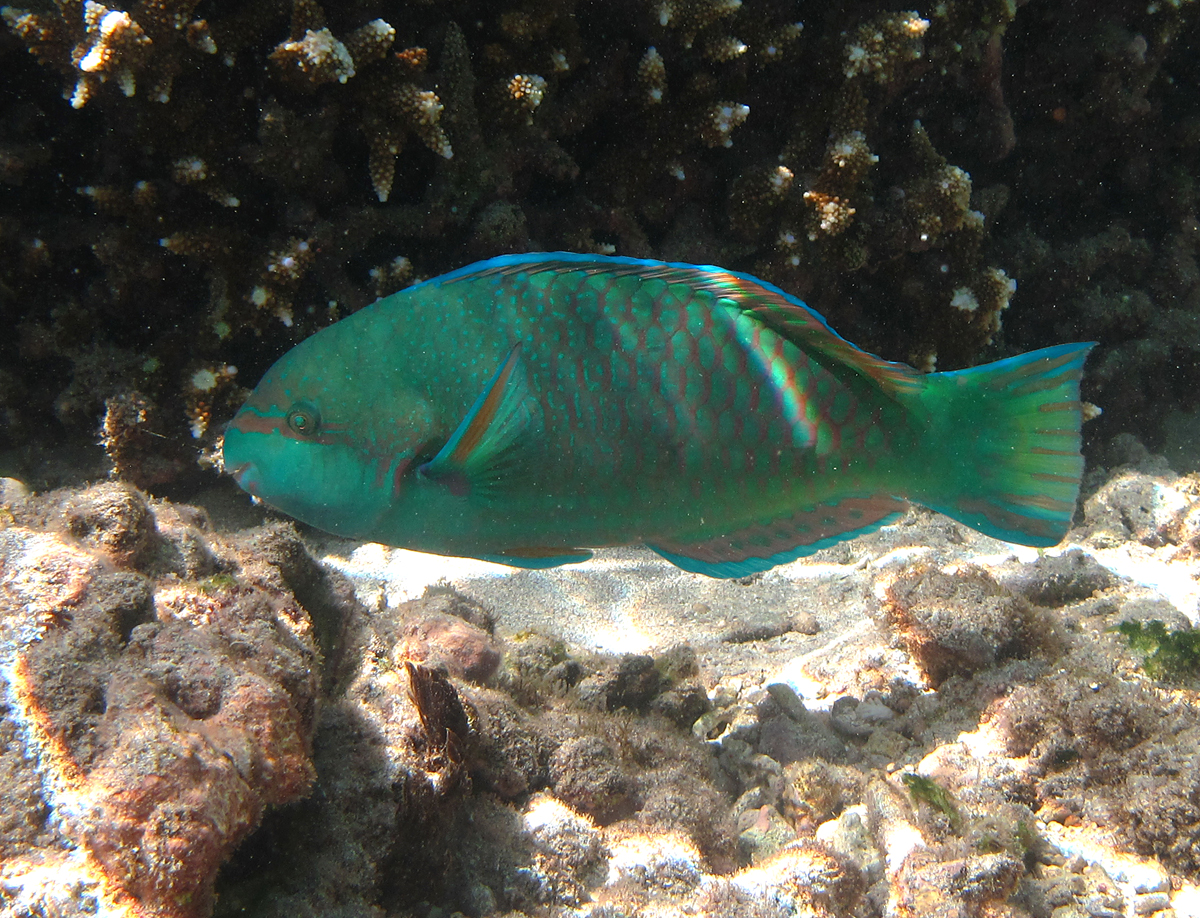

Conservation status
- Least Concern (IUCN 3.1)

Scientific classification
- Kingdom: Animalia
- Phylum: Chordata
- Class: Actinopterygii
- Order: Labriformes
- Family: Labridae
- Genus: Scarus
- Species: S. globiceps

Binomial name
- Scarus globiceps Valenciennes, 1840

Synonyms
- Callyodon globiceps (Valenciennes, 1840); Callyodon lepidus (Jenyns, 1842); Pseudocarus spilonotus Kner, 1868; Pseudoscarus fuscus De Vis, 1885; Pseudoscarus maculiceps Peters, 1876; Pseudoscarus strigipinnis De Vis, 1885; Scarus lepidus Jenyns, 1842; Scarus pronus Fowler, 1900

= Scarus globiceps =

Species of fish

Scarus globiceps, commonly known as the globehead, violet-lined, speckled or roundhead parrotfish, is a marine fish native to the Indian and Pacific Oceans, where it lives in coral reefs.

French naturalist Achille Valenciennes described the globehead parrotfish in 1840. The species was the first parrotfish collected by Charles Darwin—from the waters around Tahiti and then from the Cocos Islands; the former was described as a new species and given the name Scarus lepidus by Leonard Jenyns, while the latter was confirmed as the current species. In 1900, Henry Weed Fowler described a specimen from Caroline Island as Scarus pronus, which was later synonymised with this species.

The globehead parrotfish can grow up to 45 cm (18 in) long and weigh up to 0.5 kg (1.1 lb). The adult male in terminal phase has a predominantly green body with its scales bordered with salmon pink. The tail fin is green with salmon-pink bands. It has a horizontal pink band bordered with green running from the snout through its eyes to the end of the opercle. It has 1 or 2 canine teeth on the upper and lower plates. Initial phase globehead parrotfish are grey-brown, their abdomens bearing three white bands.

The range is from the Society and Line Islands in the Pacific west to the Ryukyu Islands in the north, the Great Barrier Reef in the south, and across the Indian Ocean to east Africa. It is found more commonly on outer reefs but can also inhabit lagoons, generally to a depth of around 12 metres (39 ft) and occasionally down to 30 metres (98 ft).

Scarus globiceps is harvested for food in Guam.
