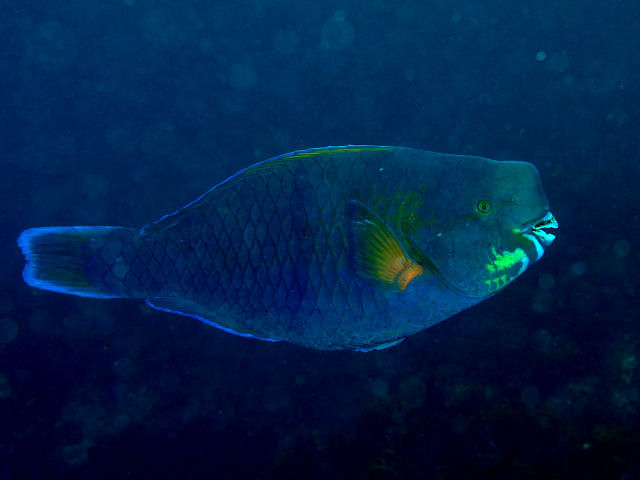

Conservation status
- Data Deficient (IUCN 3.1)

Scientific classification
- Kingdom: Animalia
- Phylum: Chordata
- Class: Actinopterygii
- Order: Labriformes
- Family: Labridae
- Genus: Scarus
- Species: S. ovifrons

Binomial name
- Scarus ovifrons Temminck and Schlegel, 1846

= Knobsnout parrotfish =

Species of fish

The knobsnout parrotfish (Scarus ovifrons) or blue humphead parrotfish is a species of marine ray-finned fish, a parrotfish, in the family Scaridae which is famous for its characteristic blue color. It lives in reefs and coral reefs. It grows to a maximum length of about 90 cm. Its body is a strong blue color, and may have reddish-brown, white, or black spots on it. Adult fish have whitish spots on their cheeks and a lump on their foreheads. Young fish have no spots on their cheeks or lumps on their foreheads. It is found in the northwestern Pacific Ocean off Japan and Taiwan.

== Diet ==
It primarily feeds on epilithic red algae and detritus growing on rocky surfaces. Coralline algae is less commonly fed on. Large fish that are over 40 cm in length have also been recorded feeding on live Acropora solitaryensis coral. By limiting algae growth, parrotfishes encourage the growth of coral on reefs.

== Sex change ==
Like most other parrotfish, the species undergoes sex change from female to male as it grows, although little information about this is known. The sexes cannot be distinguished on the basis of the hump at the front of the head, as both sexes display this trait as adults, nor can the sexes be distinguished on the basis of size, as it is unknown at what size sex change occurs.

== Toxicity ==
The flesh of the knobsnout parrotfish is toxic, and causes severe food poisoning if ingested. From 1953 to 2013, there have been 27 reported cases in Japan of people being poisoned upon eating the fish. Poisoning causes severe muscle pain associated with rhabdomyolysis. It is not well understood what the toxin is. It is possible that the toxin is accumulated from its diet, but it is unknown what food item would be the source of the toxin.

== Gallery ==
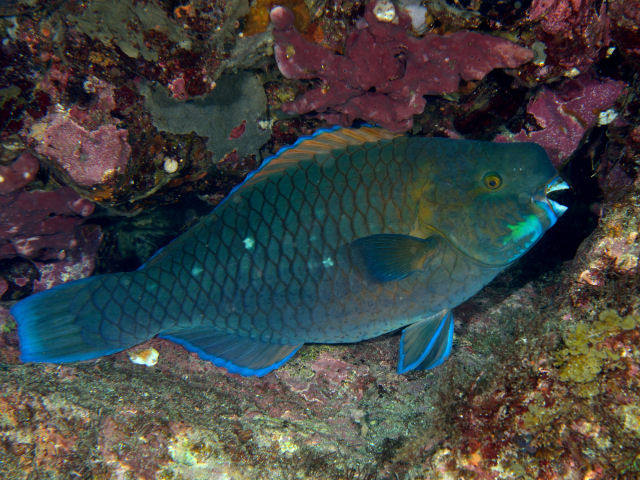

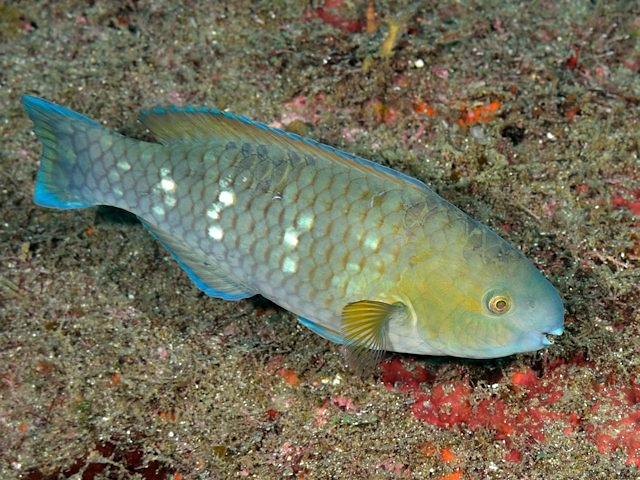

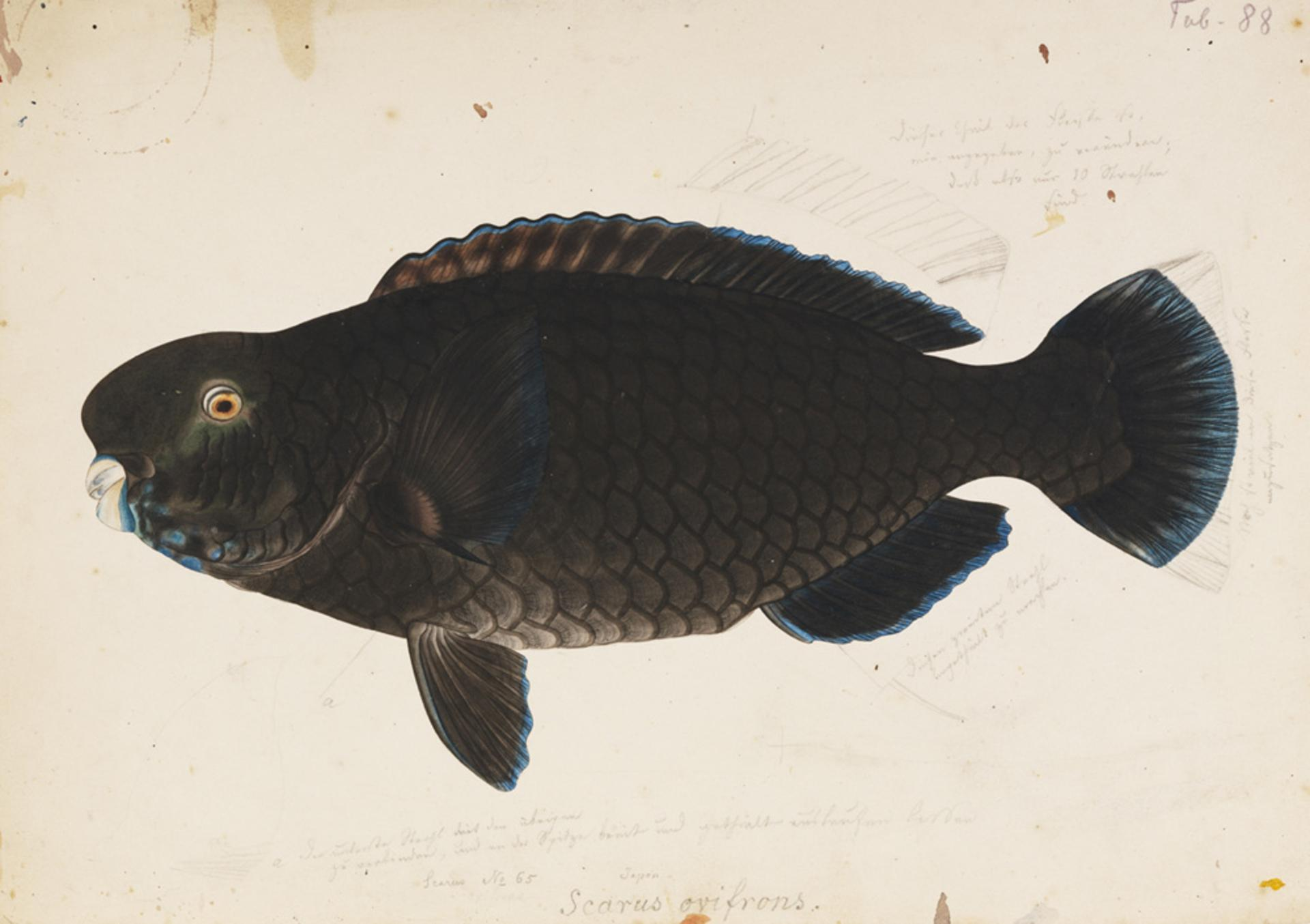
19th century water colour painting
