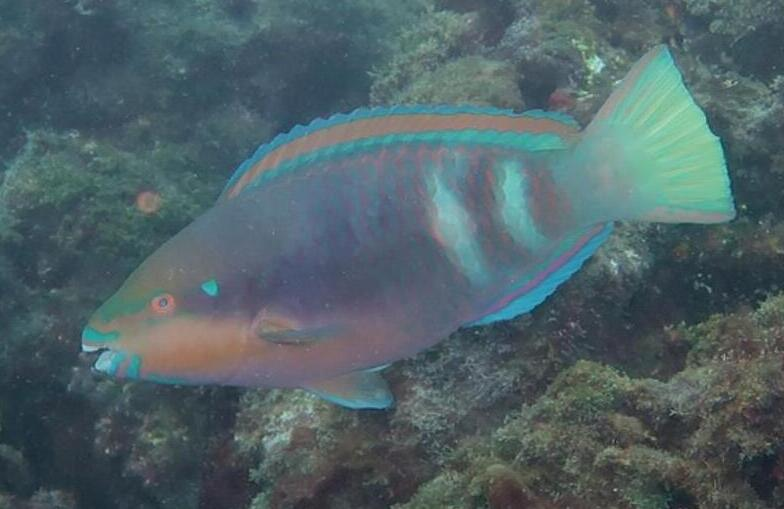

Conservation status
- Data Deficient (IUCN 3.1)

Scientific classification
- Kingdom: Animalia
- Phylum: Chordata
- Class: Actinopterygii
- Division: Teleostei
- Order: Labriformes
- Family: Labridae
- Genus: Scarus
- Species: S. zelindae

Binomial name
- Scarus zelindae Moura, Figueiredo & Sazima, 2001

= Scarus zelindae =

Species of fish

Scarus zelindae is a species of fish of the Scaridae family in the order Perciformes. This species of Parrotfish can be brown, blue, green, yellow, and purple and can change their colors several times throughout their lifetime. They live for about 5–7 years and can be found in the southwestern Atlantic Ocean, primarily in Brazilian waters.

== Morphology and life stages ==
Scarus zelindae has the nickname of fourspot parrotfish. They have three life stages called the juvenile phase, the initial phase, and the terminal phase. Juvenile fish are less colorful as they are brown with white stripes and a white belly. Zelindae in their initial stage are recognizable by their brown color and three to four white spots positioned laterally with a white stripe on their caudal fin. Individuals in their terminal phase have an orange-yellow color around the mouth area or lower head. As for differences in sex, parrotfish are hermaphrodites so there are females, primary males which are born male and remain male, and secondary males which are born female, and then later change their sex and color to be males. Secondary male Zelindae are bluish-green on the body with a yellow band on their caudal fin. They also have three to four white dots or stripes at the base of the dorsal fin. Females and primary males have a dusky purple color and contain the same 4 white splotches. Scarus zelindae possesses 9 total dorsal spines, 3 anal spines, and 7 predorsal scales: a unique feature compared to other parrotfish species. The species can reach a length of 33.2 cm and they also have an inferior mouth indicative of bottom-feeding behavior.

== Distribution and habitat ==
This species is endemic to the southwestern Atlantic Ocean, such as in the Brazilian waters, and occurs at depths from 1–60 m with a temperature range of 24–28 °C. Scarus zelindae and Scarus trispinosus are the only parrotfish species that are endemic to the Southwestern Atlantic. It is hypothesized that the Zelindae species diverged 1.0 Mya from the Taeniopterusl parrotfish species in Brazil due to the Amazon River outflow causing isolation. Terminal phase Zelindae are commonly found in coral and rocky reefs that are deeper in the ocean and further from the coast. Juveniles, on the other hand, are located in a nursery habitat in more shallow reefs near the coast. Some specific habitat locations with a high Scarus zelindae biomass are the fire coral colonies of the Aborlhos Bank and the Davies Bank. This is due to these habitats having a high amount of cyanobacteria on the sponges and corals which is an important source of nutrients for parrotfish.

== Diet ==
Scarus Zelinade is primarily a herbivore. They ingest algae and detritus but have a preference for turf algae while juveniles feed on fire corals. Although polyps can make up as much as half of their diet, none of them are purely corallivores. The digestive system of these parrotfish contains additional teeth within their throats that break down coral fragments into the renowned white sands of the southwestern Atlantic Ocean. This process, known as bioerosion, reduces the number of algae while generating fresh surfaces for developing corals to cling to and grow on. Research on parrotfish has shown that they occasionally eat other tiny species, including bacteria, detritus, and invertebrates (sessile and benthic species, as well as zooplankton).

== Movement and behavior ==
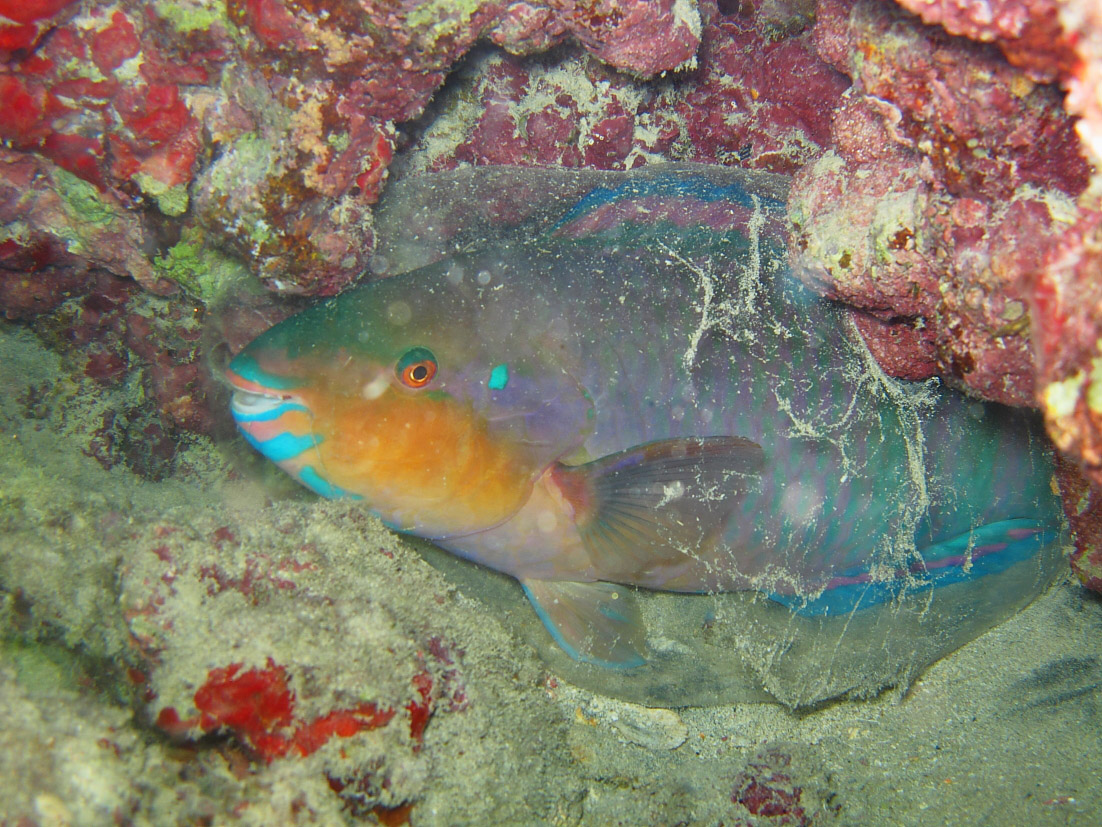
In its "mucus sleeping bag".

Parrotfish swim in a rowing style by using their pectoral fins. The movement patterns of these fish are influenced by the abundance of algae in a particular habitat since if they find a good feeding spot, they will defend their feeding territory while waiting for algae to regrow. This species of parrotfish are scrapers, which has less powerful jaws, but can also act as excavators, which have larger, stronger jaws. Parrotfish are classified as scrapers due to their weaker and more mobile oral apparatus. Scrapers have a mobile and complex jaw articulation with slender musculature and a non-excavating bite that restricts them to the removal of algae from the substratum surface only. During the day, Scarus zelindae scrapes algae from coral reefs in the southwest Atlantic Ocean with a parrot-like beak. At night, the fish sleeps in coral and wraps itself in a mucus cocoon. The parrotfish secretes mucus from glands near its gills, a process that can take up to an hour. Scientists believe the mucus sleeping bags mask the fish's scent, protecting it from predators.^{[4]} It is also thought that the parrotfish's mucus protects it from bloodthirsty isopods. Due to their feeding habits, Scarus zelindae plays an important role in bioerosion. They can remove algae from rocks by using their sharp beak. This also aids in producing and maintaining coral sand for the reef biome.

== Reproduction ==
Spawning takes place in shallow waters year round with an increase in summer months. These spawning cycles are synced with the tidal cycles. Females can release thousands of eggs into the water, and males fertilize them with sperm. The eggs will attach to the plankton and remain there until they hatch. They will then swim around the coral. Parrotfish are hermaphrodites since females can change their sex to become male based on the social cues of the population. Offspring are almost always females. Some of them, however, will mature into males over time. Experts are unsure exactly what causes some to change and others not to. One theory is that sex changes occur when population densities are low since there is a lack of breeding males and females.

== Threats and importance ==
In recent decades, Scarus zelindae has faced up to a 50% reduction in total abundance. The species is listed as vulnerable by the Brazilian Red List. One of the most prominent threats to parrotfish is fisheries along the coasts of Brazil. Recreational spearfishing targets adult parrotfish in their terminal phase and could cause them to become locally extinct if this continues. In addition, habitat degradation such as the deforestation of mangroves and the removal of seagrasses has negatively impacted the lifecycle of parrotfish. If the species continues to decline, we could lose a species that is critical to the functioning of the southwestern Atlantic Ocean. Parrotfish play an important ecological role in sustaining coral reefs, something that is vital to maintaining the health and diversity of marine ecosystems. They do this by removing dead coral skeletons and transporting sediment which promotes the replenishment of corals. 90% of their day is spent eating and scraping seagrass and algae off of coral reefs which allows corals to thrive as they can be smothered by overgrowing macroalgae. Scarus zelindae promotes coral recruitment by breaking down coral into white sands providing sediment for baby corals to attach to and grow. This process helps recycle nutrients and contributes to the reef's carbonate budget. Thus, since parrotfish and coral depend on each other to survive, parrotfish are also vulnerable to the same global factors that threaten coral reefs such as climate change, pollution, and ocean acidification.

== Bibliography ==
- Fenner, Robert M.: The Conscientious Marine Aquarist. Neptune City, New Jersey, United States: T.F.H. Publications, 2001.
- Helfman, G., B. Collette and D. Facey: The diversity of fishes. Blackwell Science, Malden, Massachusetts, United States, 1997.
- Hoese, D.F. 1986. M.M. Smith and P.C. Heemstra (eds.) Smiths' sea fishes. Springer-Verlag, Berlin, Germany.
- Maugé, L.A. 1986. A J. Daget, J.-P. Gosse and D.F.E. Thys van den Audenaerde (eds.) Check-list of the freshwater fishes of Africa (CLOFFA). ISNB Brussels; MRAC, Tervuren, Flanders; and ORSTOM, Paris, France. Vol. 2.
- Moyle, P. and J. Cech.: Fishes: An Introduction to Ichthyology, 4th edition, Upper Saddle River, New Jersey, United States: Prentice-Hall. Year 2000.
- Nelson, J.: Fishes of the World, 3rd edition. New York City, United States: John Wiley and Sons. Year 1994.
- Wheeler, A.: The World Encyclopedia of Fishes, 2nd edition, London: Macdonald. Year 1985.
