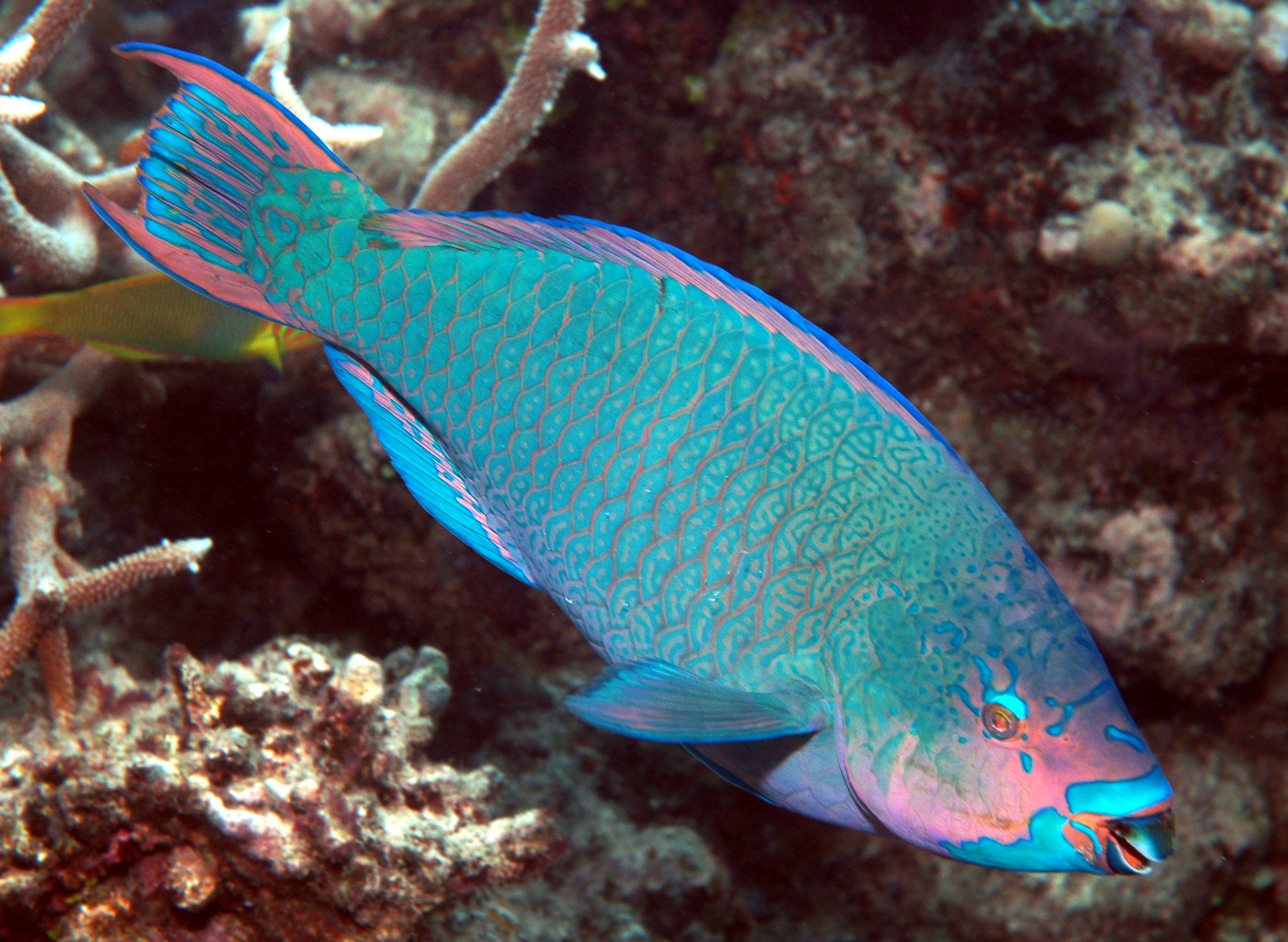

Conservation status
- Least Concern (IUCN 3.1)

Scientific classification
- Kingdom: Animalia
- Phylum: Chordata
- Class: Actinopterygii
- Order: Labriformes
- Family: Labridae
- Genus: Scarus
- Species: S. altipinnis

Binomial name
- Scarus altipinnis (Steindachner, 1879)

Synonyms
- Pseudoscarus altipinnis Steindachner, 1879; Callyodon waitei Seale, 1906; Pseudoscarus brevifilis Günther, 1909; Scarus brevifilis (Günther, 1909)

= Scarus altipinnis =

Species of fish

Scarus altipinnis, the filament-finned parrotfish, high-fin parrotfish or mini-fin parrotfish, is a species of marine ray-finned fish, a parrotfish from the family Scaridae. It occurs in the tropical and subtropical Western Pacific Ocean.

== Description ==
Scarus altipinnis is distinguished from its congeners in the genus Scarus by the possession of a slightly elongated middle ray in the dorsal fin of the terminal phase males. These males are patterned with green towards the tail and have tow bluish-green bars on their chins and similar coloured spots and lines around the eye and operculum. They also have crescent-shaped tails which have slightly lengthened filaments in their centre. The females, the initial phase, are brownish with a scattering of white spots while the juveniles are striped or mottled with an obvious yellow head. The maximum total length attained is 60 centimetres (24 in).

== Distribution ==
Scarus altipinnis is found in the western Pacific Ocean from the Ryukyu Islands south to Lord Howe Island, throughout Micronesia to the Line Islands and Ducie Island.

== Habitat and biology ==
Scarus altipinnis frequently occurs large groups. The adults are normally recorded along the reef margin of seaward reefs whereas the juveniles and subadults inhabit shallow protected reefs. This species grazes on algae at depths of between 1–50 metres (3.3–164.0 ft). The adults and subadults are sociable while the juveniles are usually solitary. This is an oviparous fish and the male and female form pairs to spawn.

== Human usage ==
Scarus altipinnis is commercially exploited and may be exported in Micronesia. It is fished for elsewhere in its range on a smaller scale.

== Threats ==
The biggest threat to Scarus altipinnis is commercial fishing, especially in Micronesia, and habitat destruction.

== Naming ==
Scarus altipinnis was first formally described as Pseudoscarus altipinnis in 1879 by the Austrian ichthyologist Franz Steindachner (1834–1919) with the type locality given as the Gilbert Islands.
