= Scarus zufar =

Conservation status
- Data Deficient (IUCN 3.1)

Scientific classification
- Kingdom: Animalia
- Phylum: Chordata
- Class: Actinopterygii
- Order: Labriformes
- Family: Labridae
- Genus: Scarus
- Species: S. zufar

Binomial name
- Scarus zufar Randall & Hoover, 1995

Species of fish

Scarus zufar, also known as Dhofar parrotfish, is a species of marine ray-finned fish, a parrotfish, in the family Scaridae. It is found along the central to southern coastal waters of Oman. S. zufar was first identified in 1995.

== Description ==
This species of parrot fish is blue-green in colour and grows to be 52 centimetres.

== Distribution ==
It has been found exclusively in the waters of the central and southern coasts of Oman.

== Habitat ==
Scarus zufar is found in rock and Coral reefs.

== Ecology ==
S. zufar is described as "fast-growing" and can live up to 9 years.

== Threats ==
There are no known threats to the Scarus zufar.
