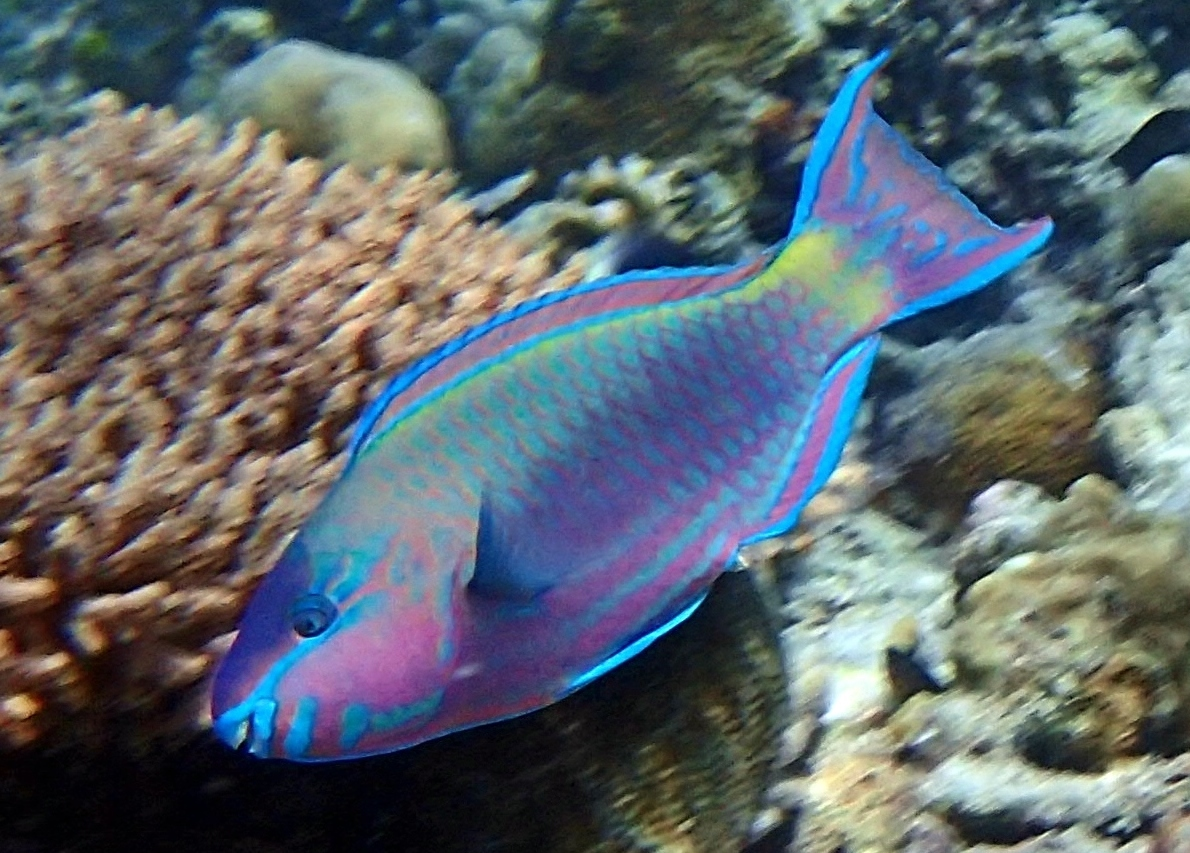
- Scarus psittacus (terminal phase)

Scientific classification
- Kingdom: Animalia
- Phylum: Chordata
- Class: Actinopterygii
- Division: Teleostei
- Order: Labriformes
- Family: Labridae
- Tribe: Scarini
- Genus: Scarus; Forsskål, 1775

Type species
- Scarus psittacus Forsskål (not of Linnaeus), 1775

Species
- about 52, see text

Synonyms
- List: Callyodon Scopoli, 1777; Calliodon Bloch & Schneider, 1801; Erychthys Swainson, 1839; Hemistoma Swainson, 1839; Petronason Swainson, 1839; Scarus Bleeker, 1847; Pseudoscarus Bleeker, 1861; Loro Jordan & Evermann, 1896; Margaritodon J. L. B. Smith, 1956; Scarops Schultz, 1958; Xenoscarops Schultz, 1958

= Scarus =

Scarus Temporal range: Late Miocene to Present

Genus of ray-finned fishes

Scarus is a genus of parrotfishes. With 52 currently recognised extant species, it is by far the largest parrotfish genus. The vast majority are found at reefs in the Indo-Pacific, but a small number of species are found in the warmer parts of the eastern Pacific and the western Atlantic, with a single species, Scarus hoefleri in the eastern Atlantic.

The genus name Scarus comes from the Greek word σκάρος (skáros), which refers to parrotfishes.

== Evolution ==
Scarus is most closely related to its sister genus Chlorurus. Most recent phylogenetic analyses find that the two genera diverged during the late Miocene (Messinian). In both genera, most of their diversification occurred some time later, within the last 3.5 million years during the Pliocene. In contrast, coral reefs in their modern form were established much earlier, during the Miocene.

Most Scarus species occur in reef habitats. Because some species such as S. zufar occur in rockier, more peripheral habitats, patterns of phylogenetic relationships have led researchers to suggest that these habitats may be the ancestral habitat type for the genus.

A 2012 phylogenetic analysis of 45 Scarus species recovered 10 major monophyletic clades.

With over 50 species, Scarus is the largest of the parrotfish genera, and the only genus to be present in all tropical and subtropical oceans.

== Description ==
Adults of most species reach maximum lengths of between 30 and 50 cm (12–20 in), but the rainbow parrotfish (Scarus guacamaia) can grow to lengths of 1.2 m (3.9 ft) and is the second largest species of parrotfish after the humphead parrotfish. S. guacamaia weighs a hundred times more than the smallest Scarus species Scarus iseri, which only reaches a maximum length of 27 cm.

In comparison to its sister genus Chlorurus, Scarus species in general have less obtuse head profiles, less extensive cheek areas, and smaller dental plates, although a few species of Scarus are exceptions to this. This may possibly reflect comparatively lower biting power, and a disparity in the ability to excavate calcareous reef subtrata.

The number of pectoral rays, which varies from 13 to 16 between Scarus species, is useful for identifying species, as well as the number of predorsal scales and the number of rows of scales on the cheek. However, most other meristic data is of limited use when identifying species of Scarus: dorsal rays, anal rays, and lateral line scales do not vary much in number between parrotfish species, and there is high intra-specific variation in gill raker count.

=== Sexual dichromatism ===
Most Scarus species are very colourful, and most are sexually dichromatic, with strikingly different initial (male and female) and terminal (male only) phases. However in a few species, initial phase and terminal phase colouration remains the same. Examples of such sexually monochromatic species include S. guacamaia, S. coelestinus, S. perrico, S. niger, and S. coeruleus.

== Ecology ==
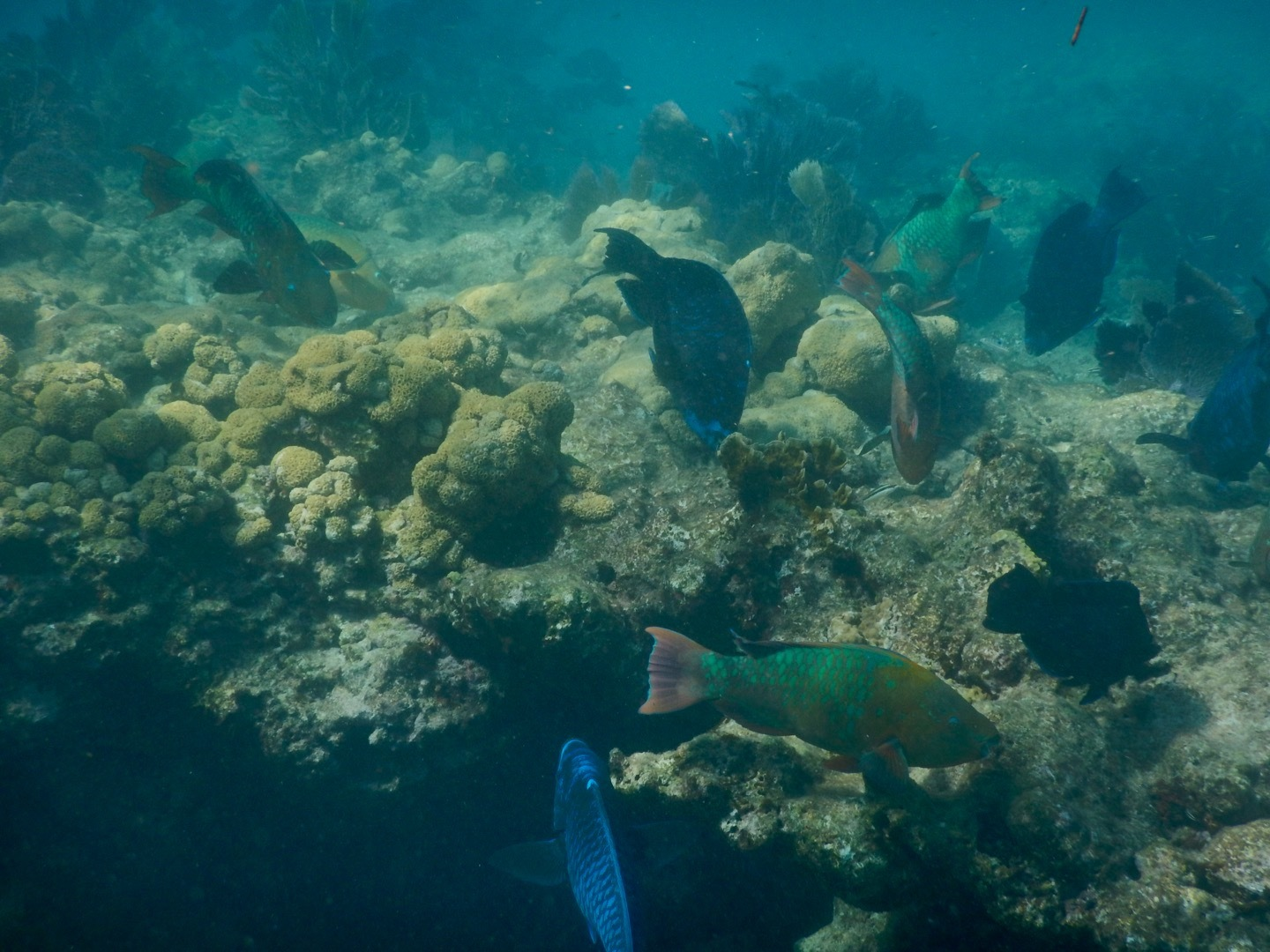
S. coelestinus with S. guacamaia in Florida, two extremely closely related species. Unlike most Scarus species, these two are not sexually dimorphic. Due to their similar appearance and sympatric distribution, they were often thought to be colour phases of the same species until the 1960s.

Scarus species are important herbivores in reef ecosystems, feeding predominantly on algae and dead coral. In the process, they facilitate bioerosion and create sediment.

Lifespan varies across different species. More short-lived species, such as the common parrotfish (S. psittacus), live for up to 6 years. Other species are more long-lived; the endangered greenback parrotfish (S. trispinosus) has been recorded living for over 20 years, and is the largest herbivorous reef fish in the South Atlantic. Its close relative, the midnight parrotfish (S. coelestinus), has been recorded reaching 31 years of age. Such large bodied and long-lived species are highly vulnerable to over-exploitation by fisheries.

Many species within the genus are sympatric with each other, and often are sympatric with their sister species; Scarus frequently underwent sympatric speciation through adaptive radiation.

== Species ==
There are currently 52 recognised species in this genus:

Species	Common name	Initial phase	Terminal phase
Scarus altipinnis (Steindachner, 1879)	filament-finned parrotfish		
Scarus arabicus (Steindachner, 1902)	Arabian parrotfish		
Scarus caudofasciatus (Günther, 1862)	red-barred parrotfish		
Scarus chameleon Choat & Randall, 1986	chameleon parrotfish		
Scarus chinensis (Steindachner, 1867)			
Scarus coelestinus Valenciennes, 1840	midnight parrotfish		
Scarus coeruleus (Edwards, 1771)	blue parrotfish		
Scarus collana Rüppell, 1835	Red Sea parrotfish		
Scarus compressus (Osburn & Nichols 1916)	azure parrotfish		
Scarus dimidiatus Bleeker, 1859	yellow-barred parrotfish		
Scarus dubius (E. T. Bennett, 1828)	regal parrotfish		
Scarus falcipinnis (Playfair, 1868)	sicklefin parrotfish		
Scarus ferrugineus Forsskål, 1775	rusty parrotfish		
Scarus festivus Valenciennes, 1840	festive parrotfish		
Scarus flavipectoralis Schultz, 1958	yellowfin parrotfish		
Scarus forsteni (Bleeker, 1861)	Forsten's parrotfish		
Scarus frenatus Lacépède, 1802	bridled parrotfish		
Scarus fuscocaudalis Randall & Myers, 2000	darktail parrotfish		
Scarus fuscopurpureus (Klunzinger, 1871)	purple-brown parrotfish		
Scarus ghobban Forsskål, 1775	blue-barred parrotfish		
Scarus globiceps Valenciennes, 1840	globehead parrotfish		
Scarus gracilis (Steindachner 1869)			
Scarus guacamaia Cuvier, 1829	rainbow parrotfish		
Scarus hoefleri (Steindachner, 1881)	Guinean parrotfish		
Scarus hypselopterus Bleeker, 1853	yellowtail parrotfish		
Scarus iseri (Bloch, 1789)	striped parrotfish		
Scarus koputea Randall & Choat, 1980	Marquesan parrotfish		
Scarus longipinnis Randall & Choat, 1980	highfin parrotfish		
Scarus maculipinna Westneat, Satapoomin & Randall, 2007	spot-fin parrotfish		
Scarus niger Forsskål, 1775	dusky parrotfish		
Scarus obishime Randall & Earle, 1993	yellowtail parrotfish		
Scarus oviceps Valenciennes, 1840	dark-capped parrotfish		
Scarus ovifrons Temminck & Schlegel, 1846	knobsnout parrotfish		
Scarus perrico Jordan & Gilbert, 1882	bumphead parrotfish		
Scarus persicus Randall & Bruce, 1983	gulf parrotfish		
Scarus prasiognathos Valenciennes, 1840	Singapore parrotfish		
Scarus psittacus Forsskål 1775	common parrotfish		
Scarus quoyi Valenciennes, 1840	Quoy's parrotfish		
Scarus rivulatus Valenciennes, 1840	rivulated parrotfish		
Scarus rubroviolaceus Bleeker, 1847	ember parrotfish		
Scarus russelii Valenciennes, 1840	eclipse parrotfish		
Scarus scaber Valenciennes, 1840	fivesaddle parrotfish		
Scarus schlegeli Bleeker, 1867	yellowband parrotfish		
Scarus spinus (Kner)	greensnout parrotfish		
Scarus taeniopterus Lesson, 1829	princess parrotfish		
Scarus tricolor Bleeker, 1847	tricolour parrotfish		
Scarus trispinosus Valenciennes, 1840	greenback parrotfish		
Scarus vetula Bloch & Schneider, 1801	queen parrotfish		
Scarus viridifucatus J. L. B. Smith, 1956	roundhead parrotfish		
Scarus xanthopleura Bleeker, 1853	red parrotfish		
Scarus zelindae Moura, Figueiredo & Sazima, 2001	Zelinda's parrotfish		
Scarus zufar Randall & Hoover, 1995	Dhofar parrotfish		

== In political thought ==
In Cesare Ripa's Renaissance iconography, the scarus fish symbolised civil "Union," i.e. the joining of individuals into a collective body. Plutarch had written that scarus fish "swim together in shoals and ingeniously and heroically free each other when caught in a net." The scarus thus "denoted reciprocal assistance in the fight for survival."
