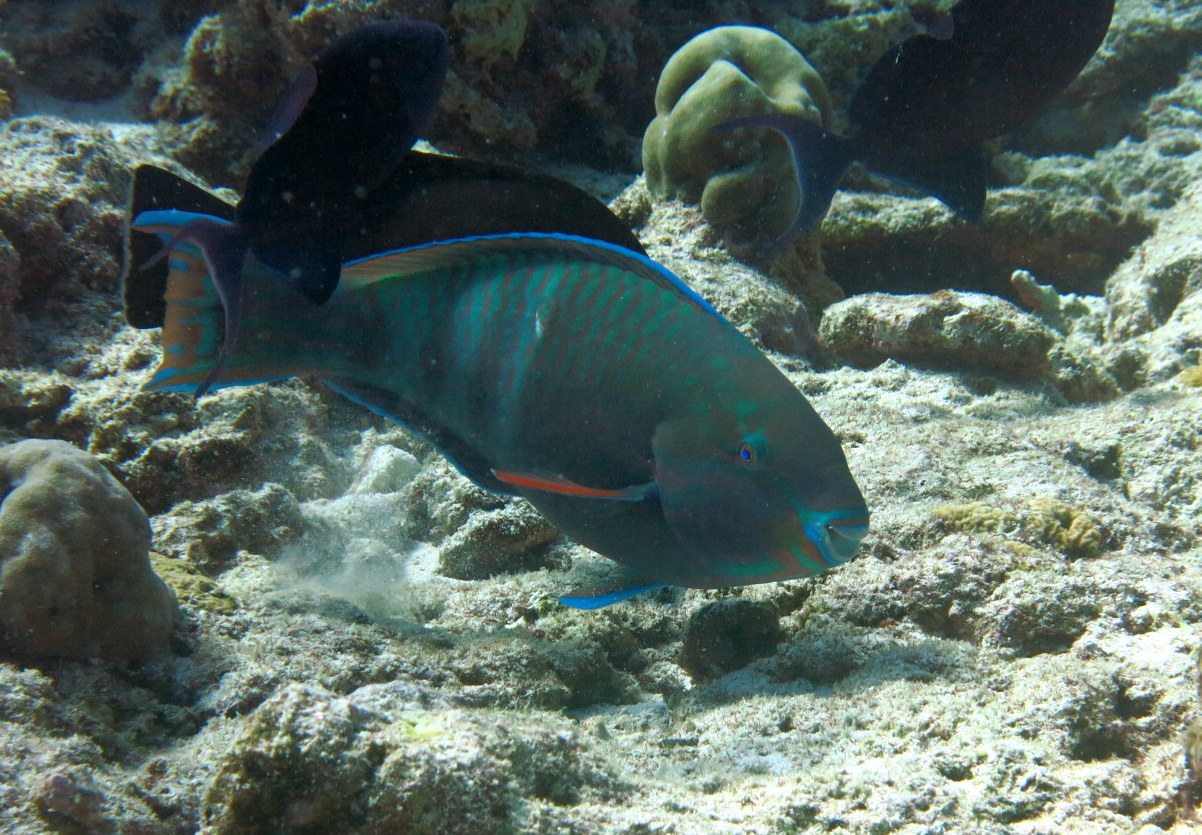
- Female eclipse parrotfish

Conservation status
- Least Concern (IUCN 3.1)

Scientific classification
- Kingdom: Animalia
- Phylum: Chordata
- Class: Actinopterygii
- Order: Labriformes
- Family: Labridae
- Genus: Scarus
- Species: S. russelii

Binomial name
- Scarus russelii Valenciennes, 1840

Synonyms
- Xanothon fowleri Smith, 1956

= Eclipse parrotfish =

Species of fish

The eclipse parrotfish (Scarus russelii), also known as Russell's parrotfish, is a species of parrotfish native to Indian Ocean countries such as Madagascar, Seychelles, and Mauritius to south India, Sri Lanka and Thailand. They inhabit waters over rocky substrates at depths from 6 to 15 m (20 to 49 ft). The maximum length is 51.0 cm (20.1 in), and weight reaches 1.1 kg (2.4 lb).
