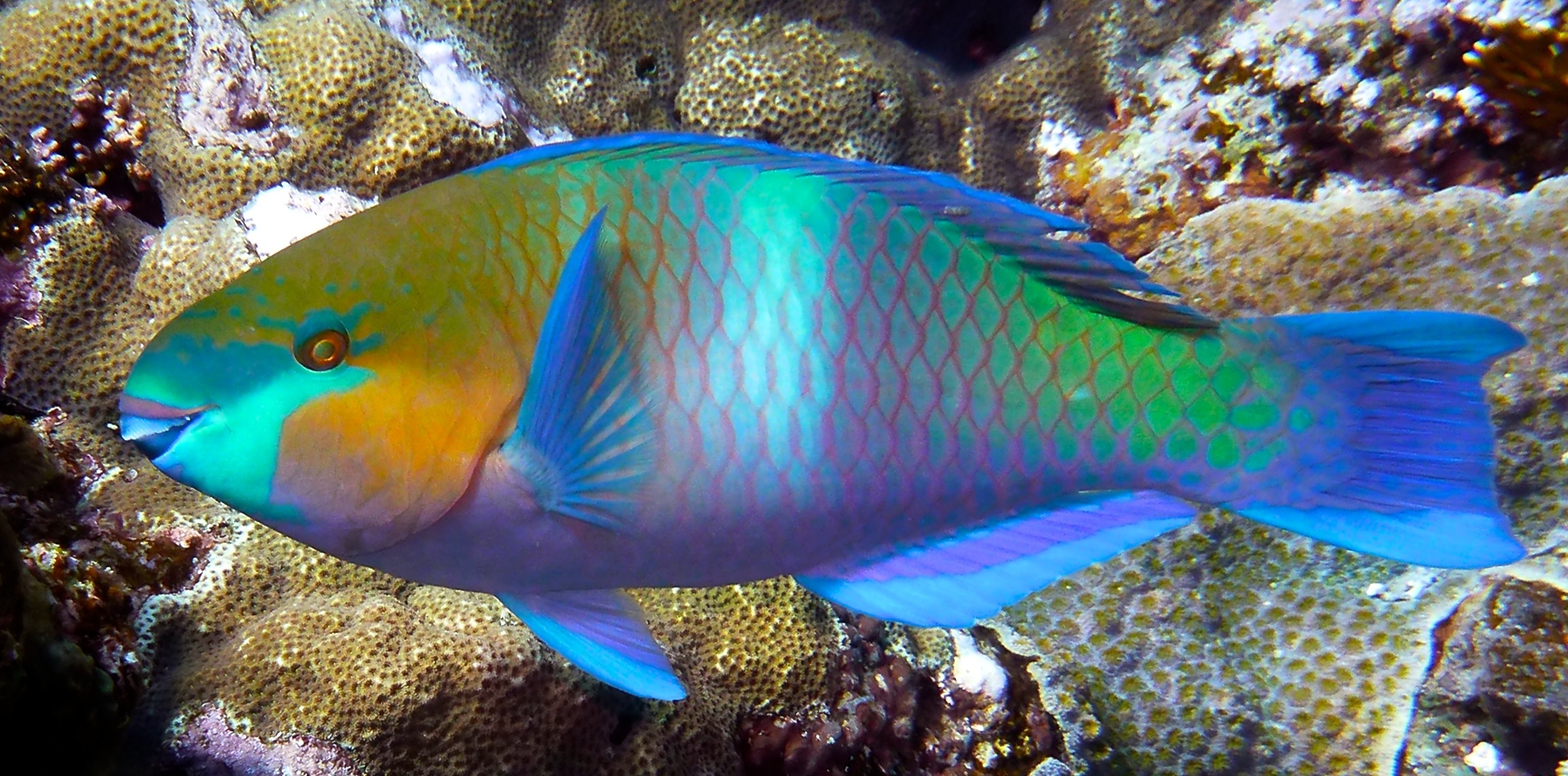
- Terminal phase, in the Red Sea

Conservation status
- Least Concern (IUCN 3.1)

Scientific classification
- Kingdom: Animalia
- Phylum: Chordata
- Class: Actinopterygii
- Order: Labriformes
- Family: Labridae
- Genus: Scarus
- Species: S. ferrugineus

Binomial name
- Scarus ferrugineus Forsskål, 1775

Synonyms
- List: Pseudoscarus augustinus Kossmann & Räuber, 1877; Scarus aeruginosus Valenciennes, 1840; Scarus caerulescens Valenciennes, 1840; Scarus marshalli Schultz, 1958

= Rusty parrotfish =

Species of fish

The rusty parrotfish (Scarus ferrugineus) is a species of marine ray-finned fish, a parrotfish belonging to the family Scaridae. It is associated with reefs in the north western Indian Ocean and the Red Sea.

== Distribution and habitat ==
This reef-associated species can be found on coral reefs at a depth of 1 – 60 m in the Red Sea, the Gulf of Aden, and the Persian Gulf where it is found off the coasts of Bahrain, Djibouti, Egypt, Eritrea, Yemen, Jordan, Iran, Qatar, United Arab Emirates, Oman, Saudi Arabia, Somalia and Sudan, as well as off Socotra. It is generally common.

== Description ==
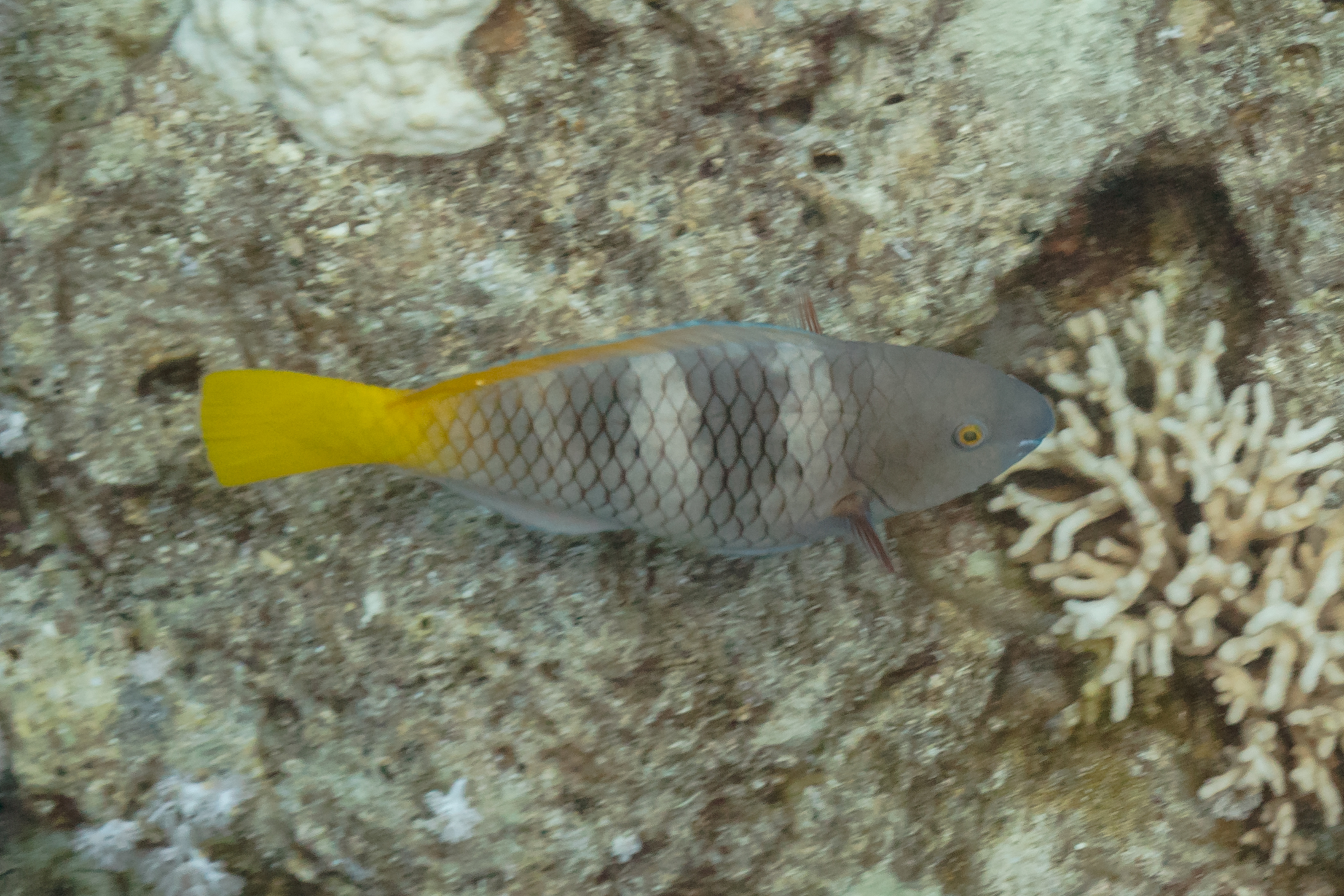
Scarus ferrugineus. Adult, initial phase

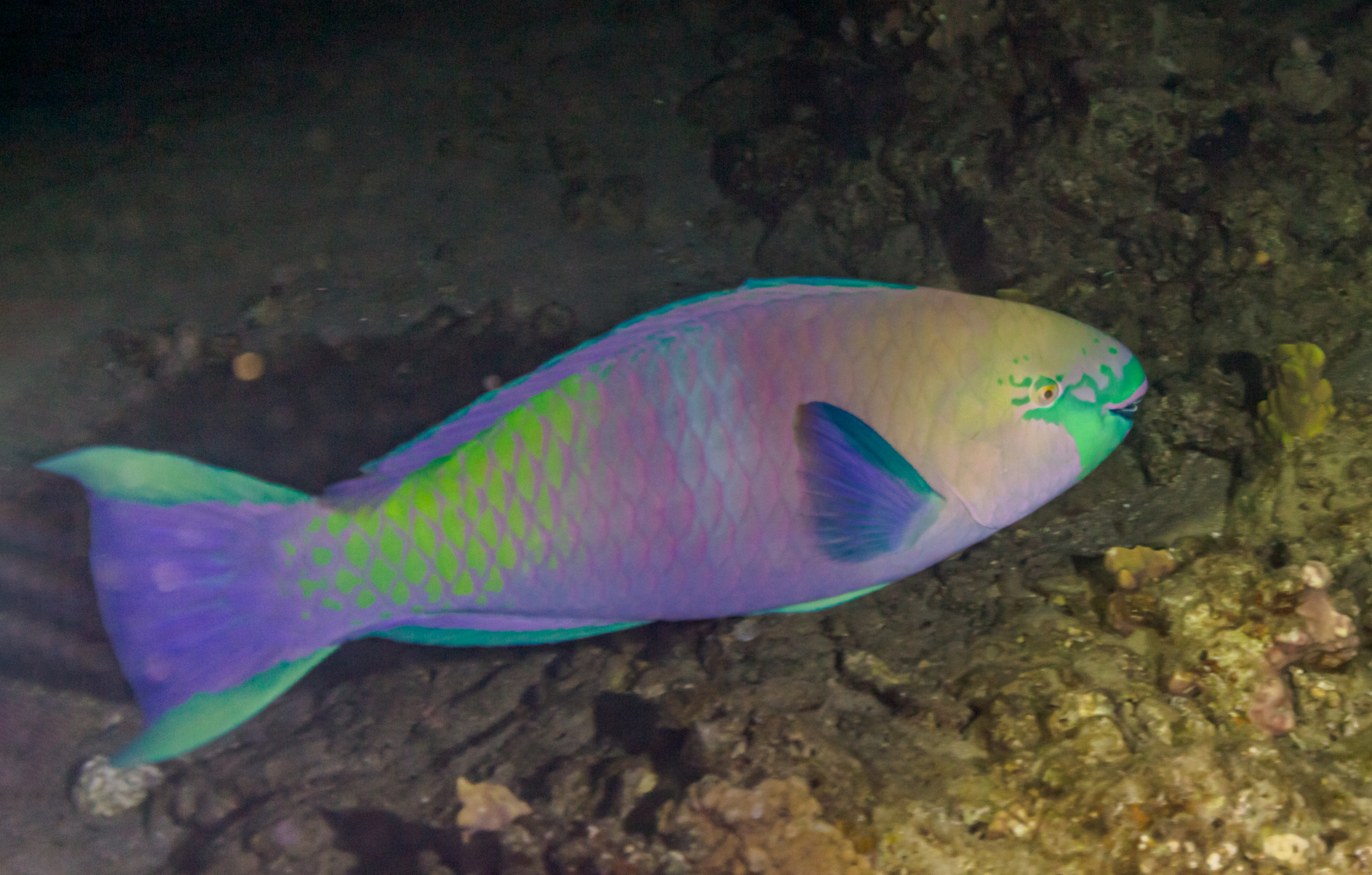
Adult, terminal phase

Scarus ferrugineus measures up to 41 cm (16 in) in length. Two colour patterns may be distinguished. While the terminal phase is multicoloured, bright in colour, mostly blue-green, the initial phase, in which frequently these fishes are seen in groups, is brownish (hence the common name) with light and dark bands and a yellow tail.

== Biology ==
These fishes can be seen from March to November. They are oviparous and protogynous hermaphrodites.

Three life phases can be distinguished, the juveniles, the adults of the initial phase (mostly females), and the adult males on the terminal phase (derived from females through sex and colour change).

Individuals in the terminal phase form harems. They feed mainly on benthic algae.

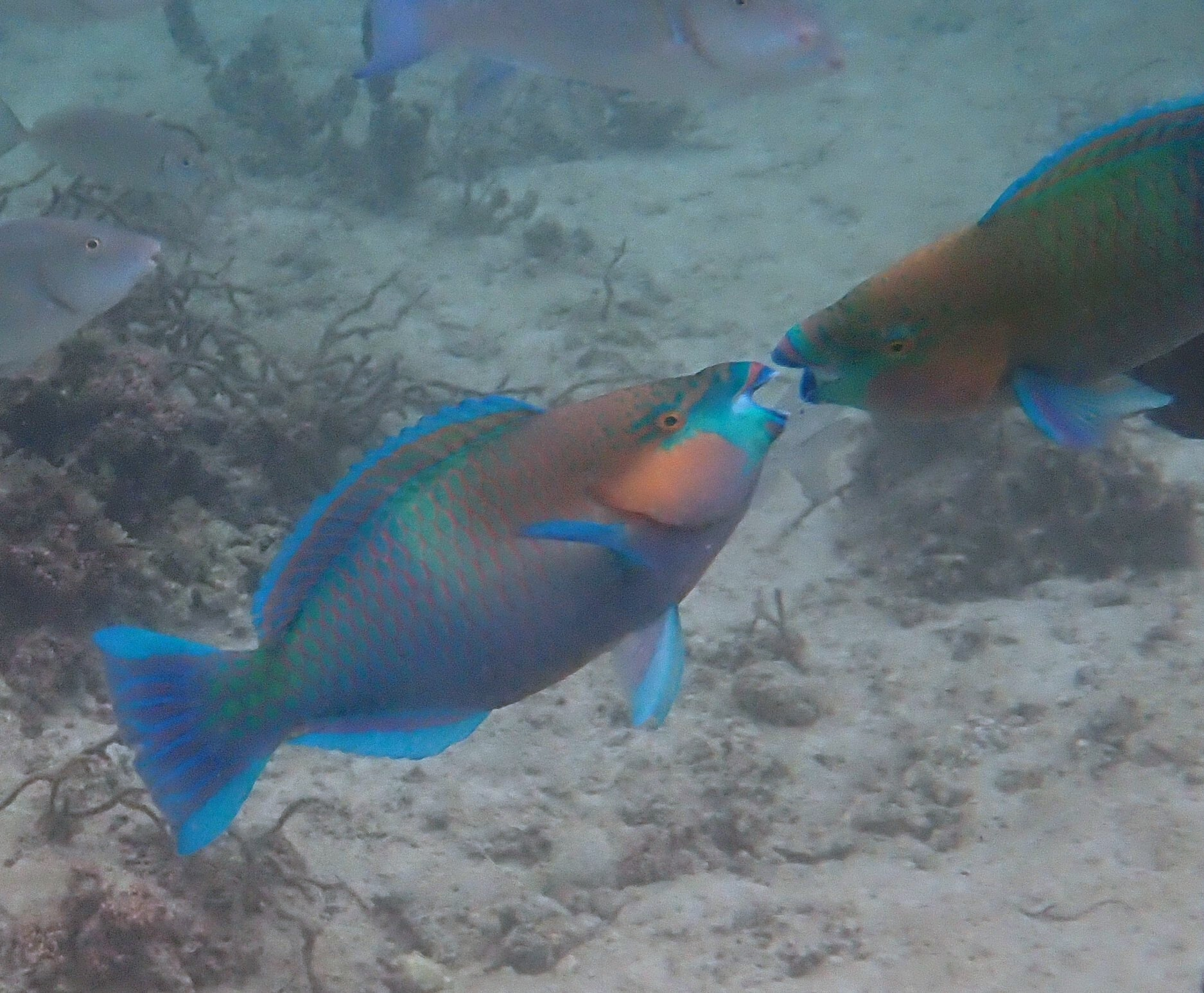
Males fighting, in the Red Sea

== Naming ==
The rusty parrotfish was first formally described as Scarus ferrugineus in 1775 by the Swedish naturalist, explorer and orientalist Peter Forsskål (1732–1763) with the type locality given as Dahab on the northwestern coast of the Gulf of Aqaba off the Sinai Peninsula in Egypt.

== Human use ==
The rusty parrotfish is a quarry species for artisanal fisheries within its range.

== Bibliography ==
- Forsskål, P. 1775. Descriptiones animalium avium, amphibiorum, piscium, insectorum, vermium; quae in itinere orientali observavit... Post mortem auctoris edidit Carsten Niebuhr. Hauniae. Descr. Animalium: 1–20 + i–xxxiv + 1–164, map.
- Helfman, G., B. Collette i D. Facey: The diversity of fishes. Blackwell Science, Malden, Massachusetts (USA), 1997.
- Moyle, P. i J. Cech.: Fishes: An Introduction to Ichthyology, 4th ed., Upper Saddle River (New York): Prentice-Hall. Any 2000.
- Nelson, J.: Fishes of the World, 3rd ed. New York: John Wiley and Sons. 1994.
- Parenti, P. i J.E. Randall, 2000. An annotated checklist of the species of the labroid fish families Labridae and Scaridae. Ichthyol. Bull. J. L. B. Smith Inst. Ichthyol. (68):1–97.
- Wheeler, A.: The World Encyclopedia of Fishes, 2nd ed., Londons: Macdonald. 1985.
