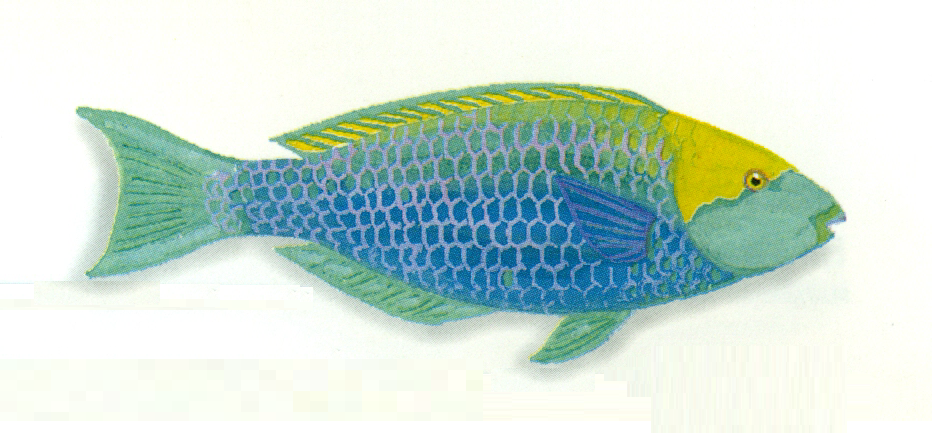
- Scarus prasiognathos (male)

Conservation status
- Least Concern (IUCN 3.1)

Scientific classification
- Kingdom: Animalia
- Phylum: Chordata
- Class: Actinopterygii
- Order: Labriformes
- Family: Labridae
- Genus: Scarus
- Species: S. prasiognathos

Binomial name
- Scarus prasiognathos Valenciennes, 1840

Synonyms
- Scarus chlorodon Jenyns, 1842; Scarus singaporensis Bleeker, 1852; Callyodon singaporensis (Bleeker, 1852); Pseudoscarus singaporensis (Bleeker, 1852); Scarus janthochir Bleeker, 1853; Callyodon janthochir (Bleeker, 1853); Pseudoscarus janthochir (Bleeker, 1853)

= Scarus prasiognathos =

Species of fish

Scarus prasiognathos, the Singapore parrotfish, is a species of marine ray-finned fish, a parrotfish, in the family Scaridae. It is native to the eastern Indian and western Pacific Oceans, where it lives in coral reefs.

This species was first formally described in 1840 by the French naturalist Achille Valenciennes (1794-1865) with the type locality given as New Ireland in the Bismarck Archipelago.

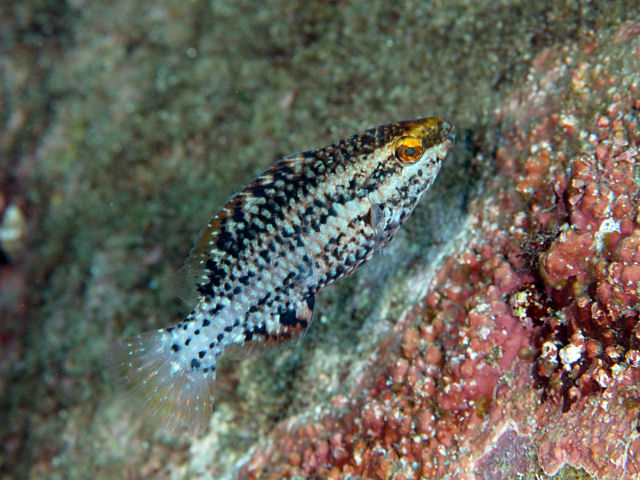
immature juvenile

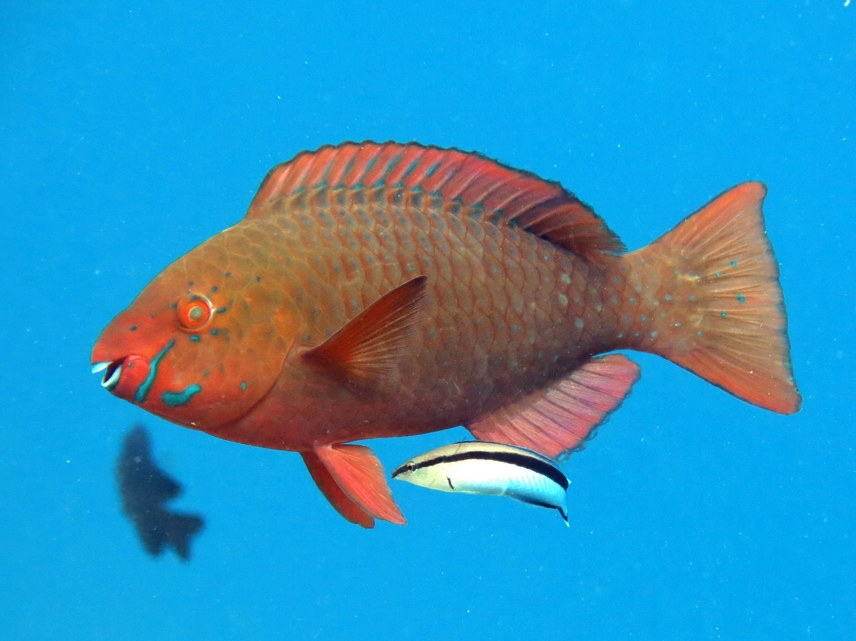
initial phase (female)

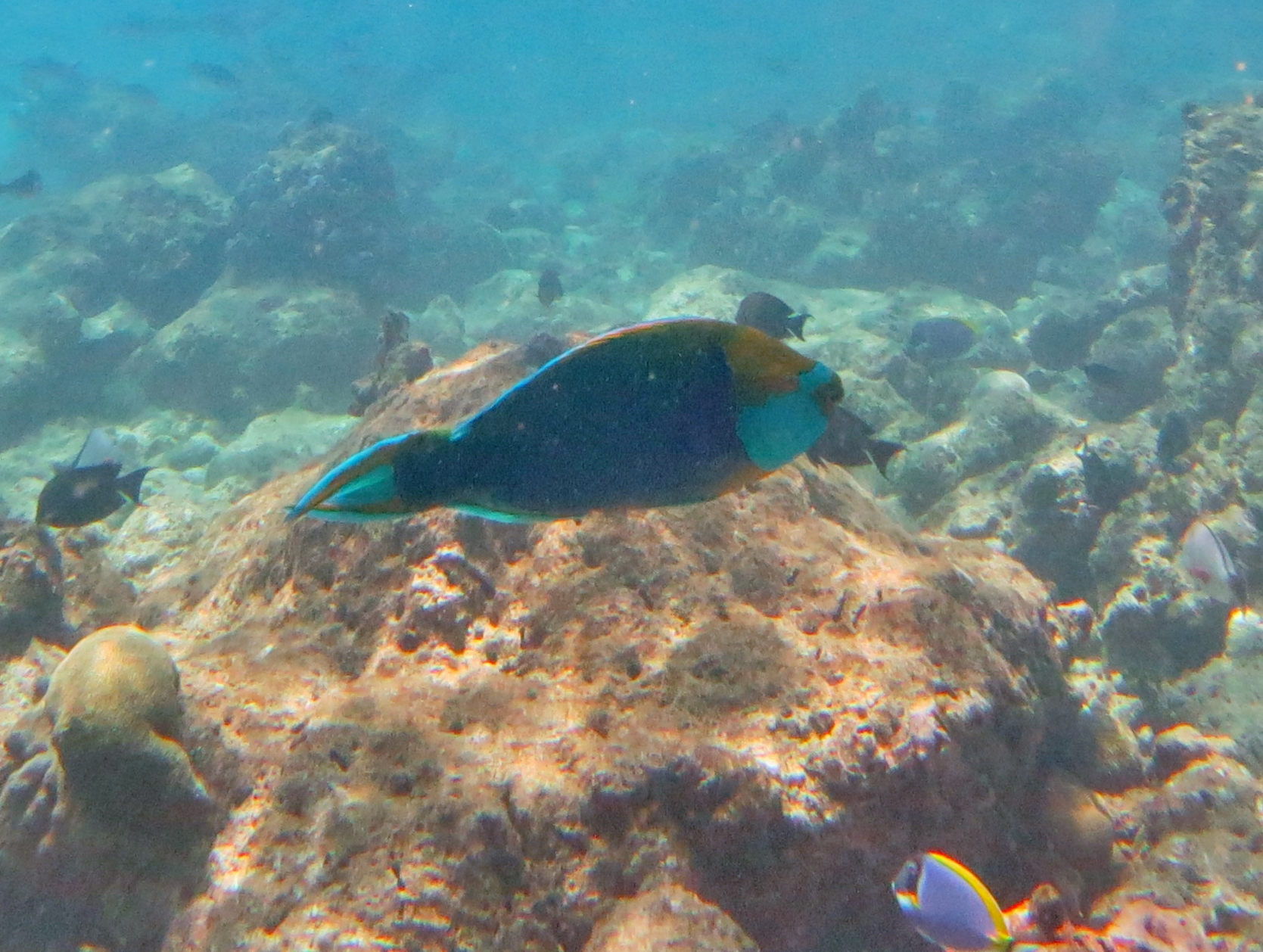
final phase (male)
