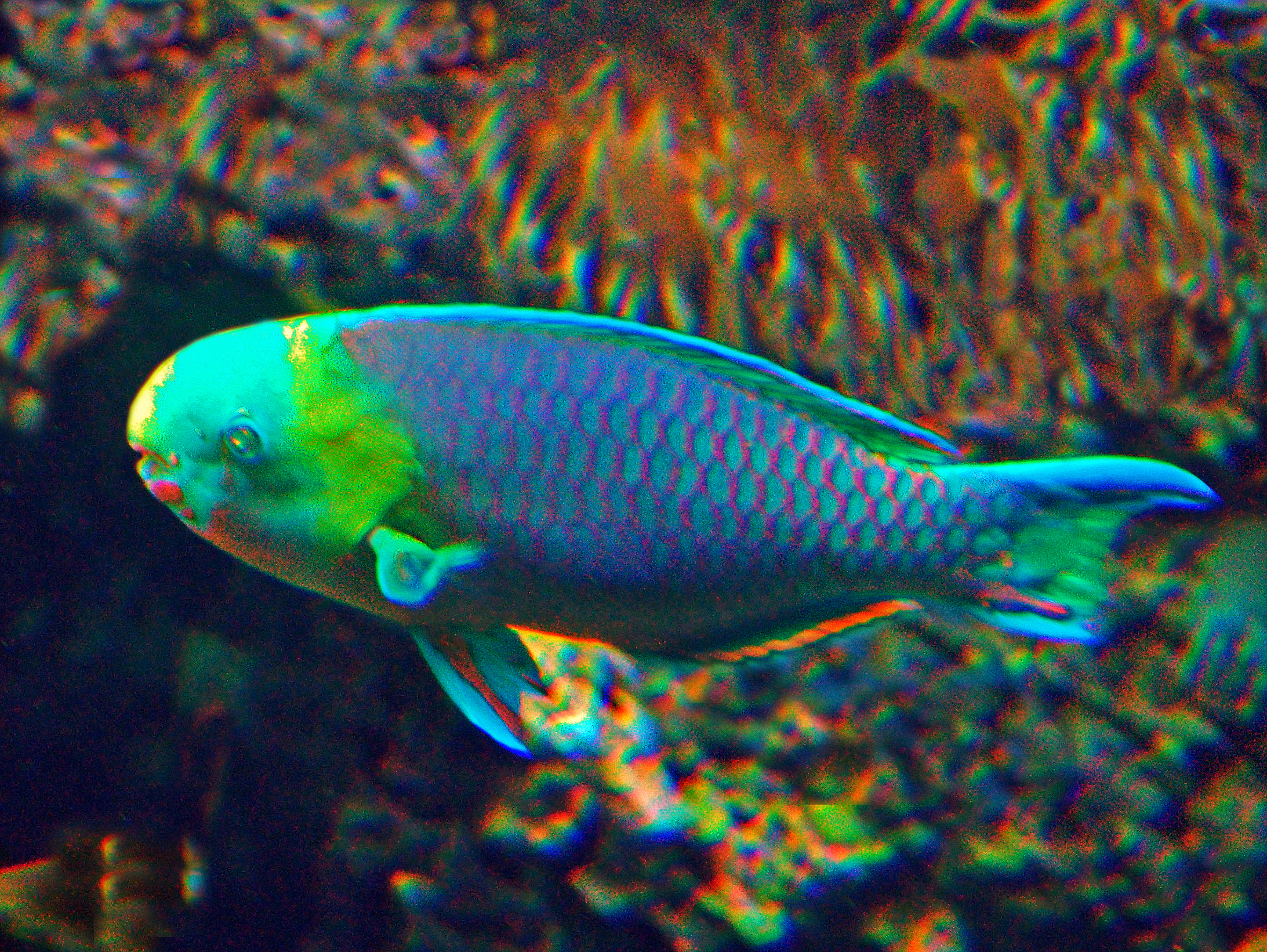

Scientific classification
- Kingdom: Animalia
- Phylum: Chordata
- Class: Actinopterygii
- Order: Labriformes
- Family: Labridae
- Genus: Scarus
- Species: S. spinus

Binomial name
- Scarus spinus (Kner), 1868

Synonyms
- Callyodon kelloggii Jordan & Seale, 1906; Pseudoscarus spinus Kner, 1868

= Scarus spinus =

Species of ray-finned fish

Scarus spinus, the Greensnout parrotfish, is a species of marine ray-finned fish, a parrotfish from the family Labridae.

== Description ==
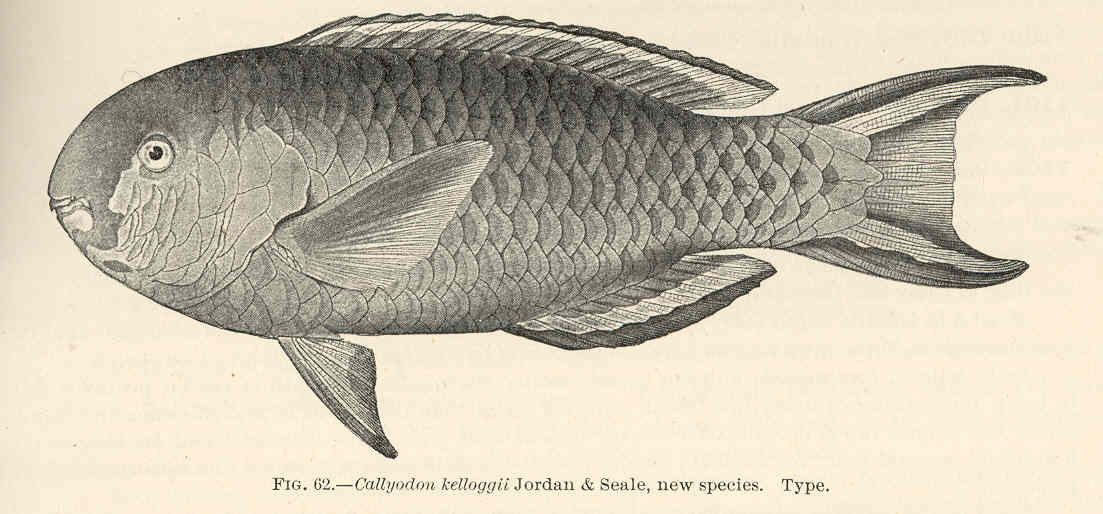
Image of Fishes of Samoa - Jordan, David Starr; Seale, Alvin (1906)

Scarus spinus can reach a total length of about 30 cm (in males). These fishes have 10 dorsal soft rays, 3 anal spines and 9 anal soft rays. Males show a bright yellow head underwater, while females are drab with white teeth and some pale spots. Caudal fin is moderately to deeply emarginate in terminal phase. Lips largely cover dental plates.

== Distribution and habitat ==
This species can be found on Christmas Island and from the Philippines to Samoa, the Ryukyu Islands and the southern Great Barrier Reef. The Greensnout parrotfish inhabits coral-rich areas of outer lagoon and seaward reefs, at a depth range 0–30 m.

== Biology ==
It appears specialized in scraping crustose coralline algae with its jaw. It can change gender from female to male (hermaphroditic).
