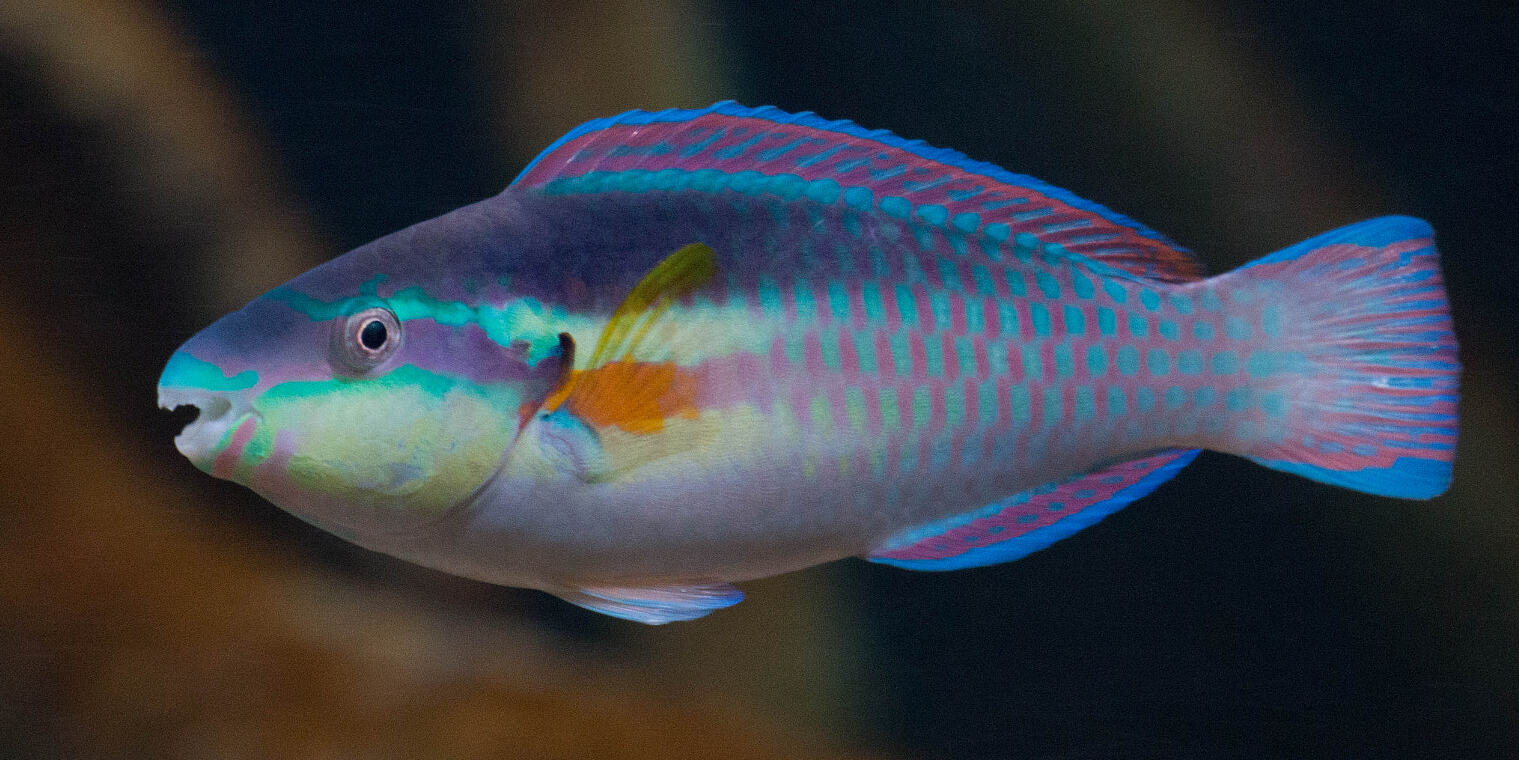

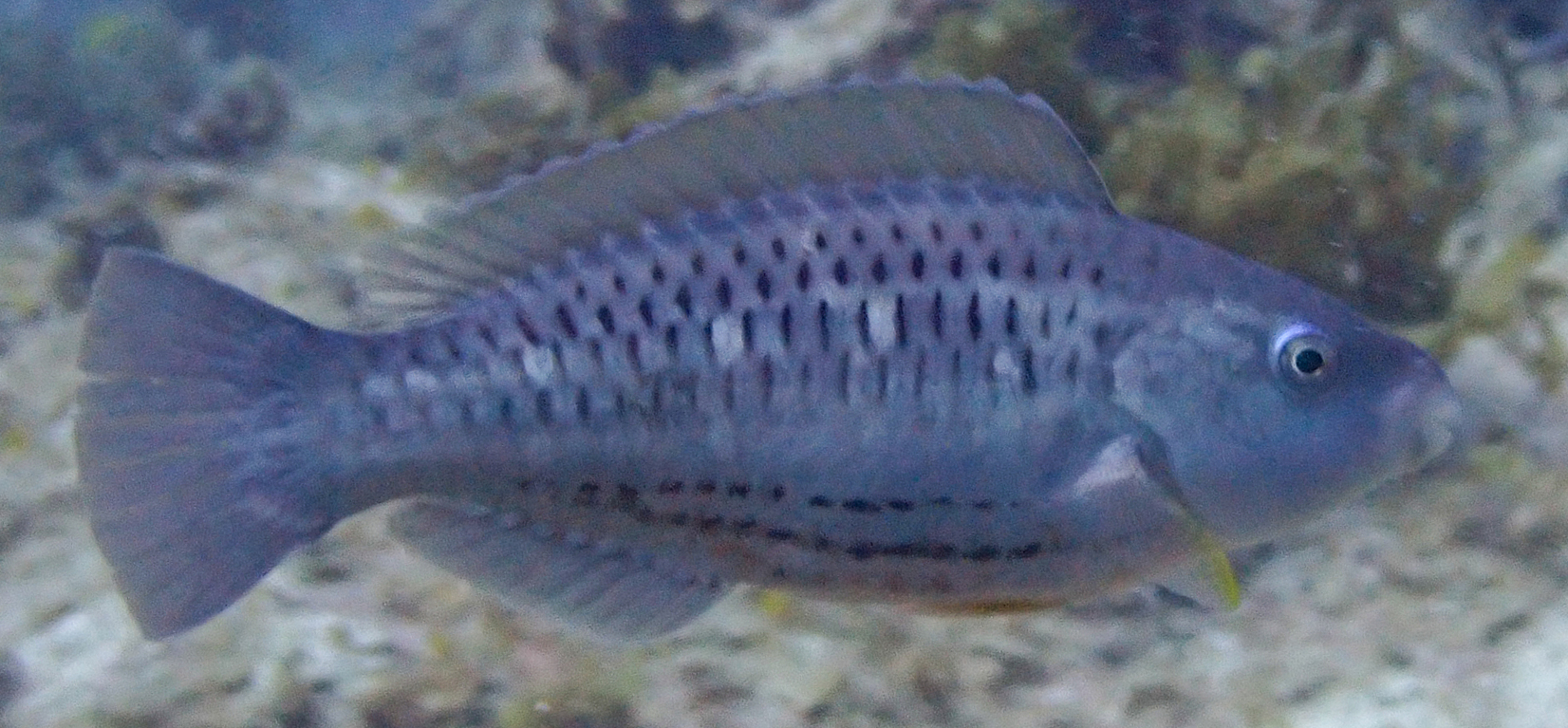
- Terminal phase (top); Initial phase (bottom)

Scientific classification
- Kingdom: Animalia
- Phylum: Chordata
- Class: Actinopterygii
- Order: Labriformes
- Family: Labridae
- Genus: Scarus
- Species: S. iseri

Binomial name
- Scarus iseri (Bloch, 1789)

= Scarus iseri =

Species of fish

Scarus iseri is a species of fish of the family Scaridae. Its common names include striped parrotfish. The species was described by Bloch in 1789.
