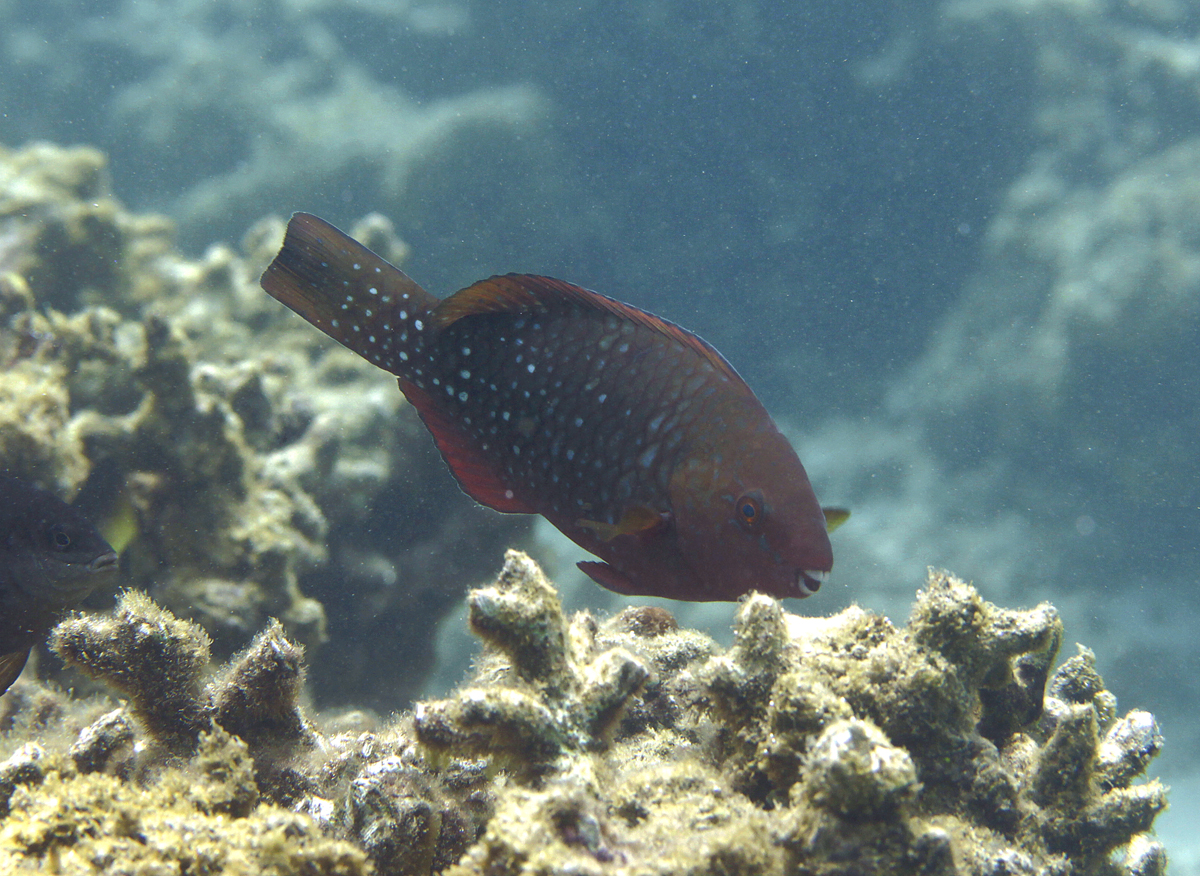

Conservation status
- Least Concern (IUCN 3.1)

Scientific classification
- Kingdom: Animalia
- Phylum: Chordata
- Class: Actinopterygii
- Order: Labriformes
- Family: Labridae
- Genus: Scarus
- Species: S. falcipinnis

Binomial name
- Scarus falcipinnis (Playfair, 1868)

= Scarus falcipinnis =

Species of fish

Scarus falcipinnis is a species of fish of the Scaridae family in the order Perciformes.

== Geographical distribution ==
It is located in coastal waters of Oman, Mozambique, Seychelles, Mauritius, Reunion and Madagascar.

== Bibliography ==
- Fenner, Robert M.: The Conscientious Marine Aquarist. Neptune City, New Jersey, United States: T.F.H. Publications, 2001.
- Helfman, G., B. Collette and D. Facey: The diversity of fishes. Blackwell Science, Malden, Massachusetts, United States, 1997.
- Hoese, D.F. 1986. M.M. Smith and P.C. Heemstra (eds.) Smiths' sea fishes. Springer-Verlag, Berlin, Germany.
- Maugé, L.A. 1986. A J. Daget, J.-P. Gosse and D.F.E. Thys van den Audenaerde (eds.) Check-list of the freshwater fishes of Africa (CLOFFA). ISNB Brussels; MRAC, Tervuren, Flanders; and ORSTOM, Paris, France. Vol. 2.
- Moyle, P. and J. Cech.: Fishes: An Introduction to Ichthyology, 4th edition, Upper Saddle River, New Jersey, United States: Prentice-Hall. Year 2000.
- Nelson, J.: Fishes of the World, 3rd edition. New York City, United States: John Wiley and Sons. Year 1994.
- Wheeler, A.: The World Encyclopedia of Fishes, 2nd edition, London: Macdonald. Year 1985.
