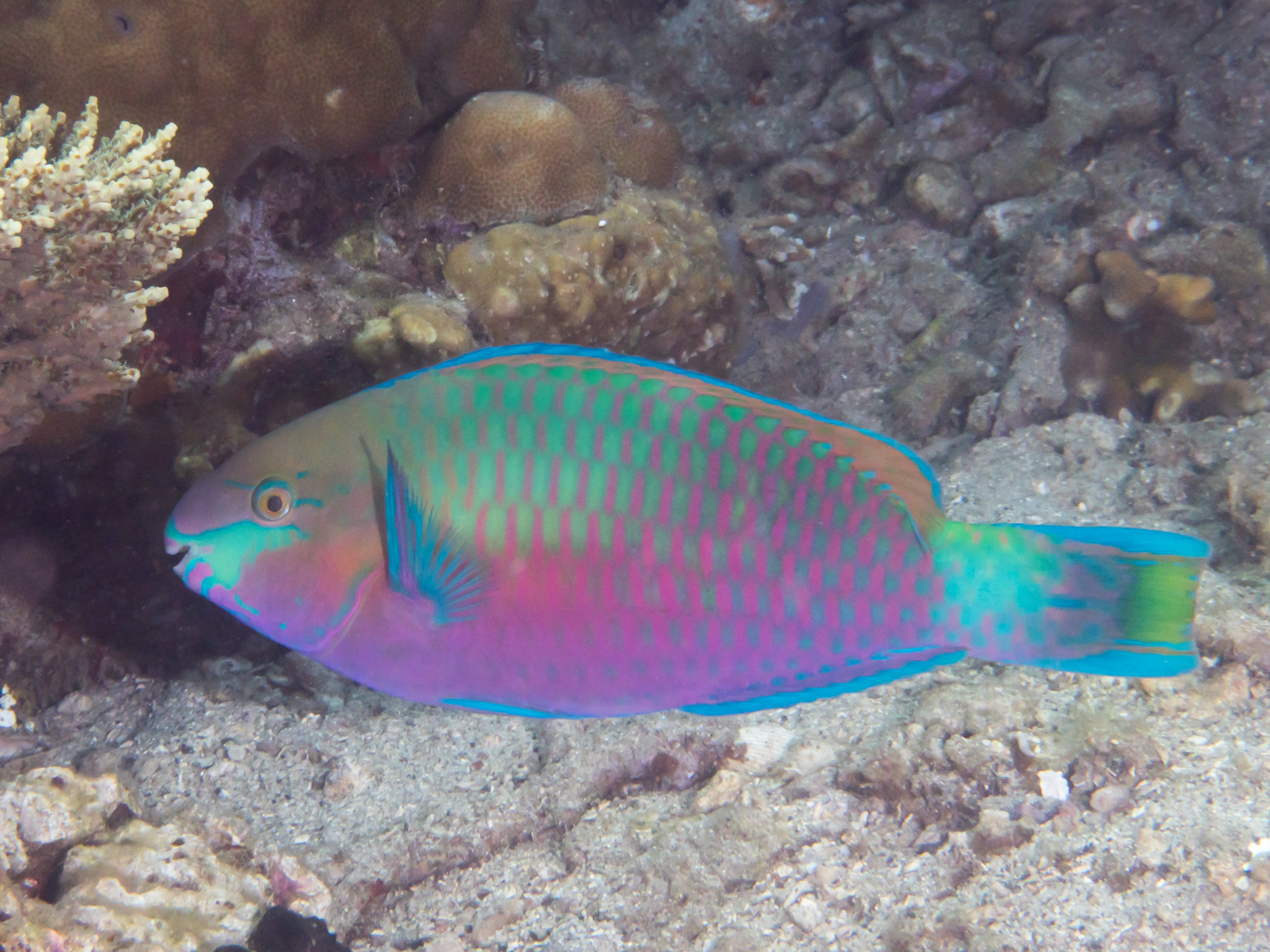

Conservation status
- Least Concern (IUCN 3.1)

Scientific classification
- Kingdom: Animalia
- Phylum: Chordata
- Class: Actinopterygii
- Division: Teleostei
- Order: Labriformes
- Family: Labridae
- Genus: Scarus
- Species: S. quoyi

Binomial name
- Scarus quoyi Valenciennes, 1840

= Scarus quoyi =

Species of fish

Scarus quoyi, commonly known as Quoy's or greenblotch parrotfish, is a species of marine ray-finned fish, a parrotfish, in the family Scaridae. It is native to the western Pacific Ocean, where it lives in coral reefs. The species can grow to a length of up to 40 cm. During night, it covers itself in a snot bubble to protect from predators.

== Distribution ==
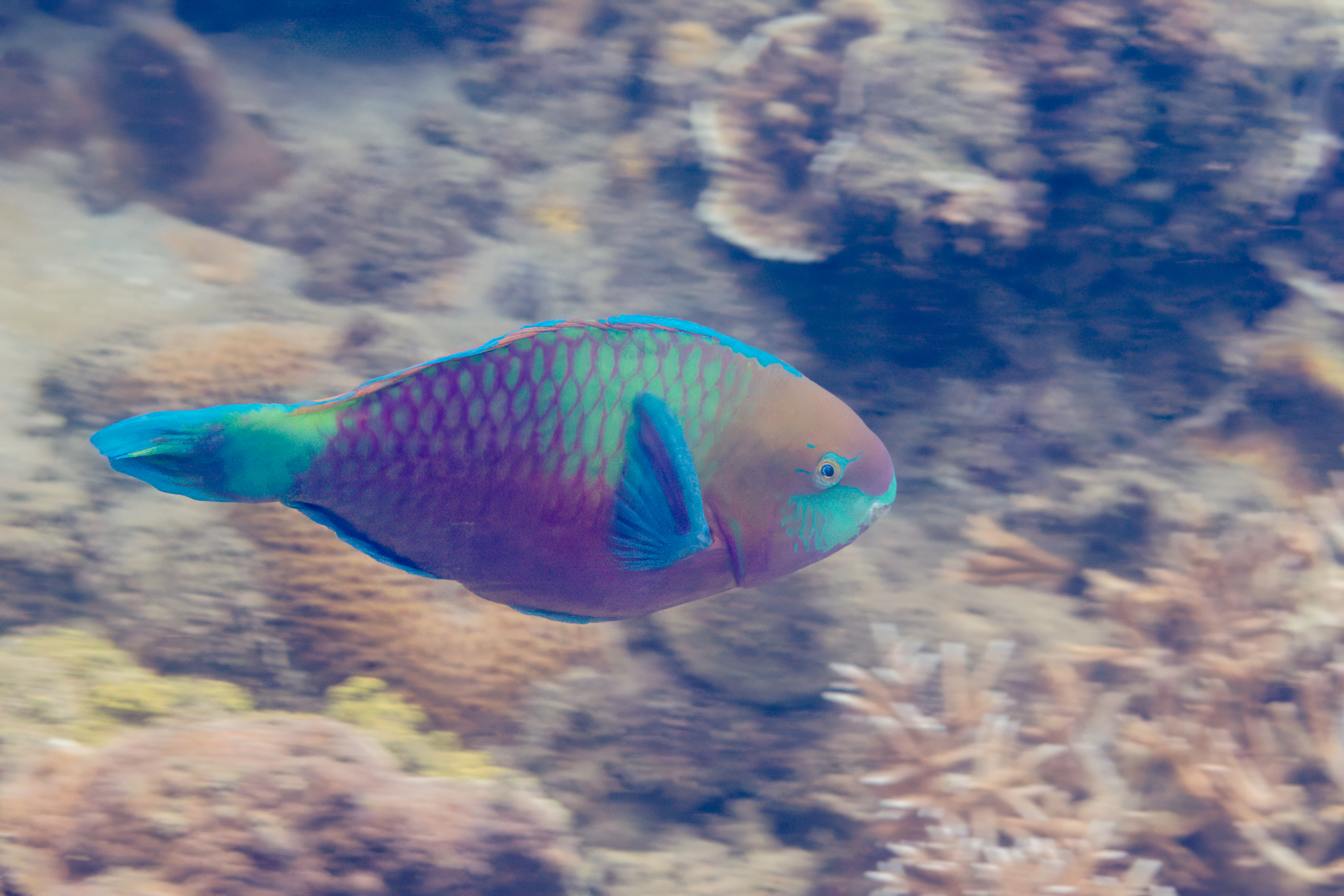
In the Philippines

The type locality is Carteret Harbour, Lambom Island, near Cape St. George in southern New Ireland in the Bismarck Archipelago.

In Australian waters, it is found in the northern Great Barrier Reef.

== Aquarium Trade ==
The Scarus quoyi makes it's way into the aquarium trade from time to time, costing between $150.00 and $500.00, depending on the size and age of the fish.
