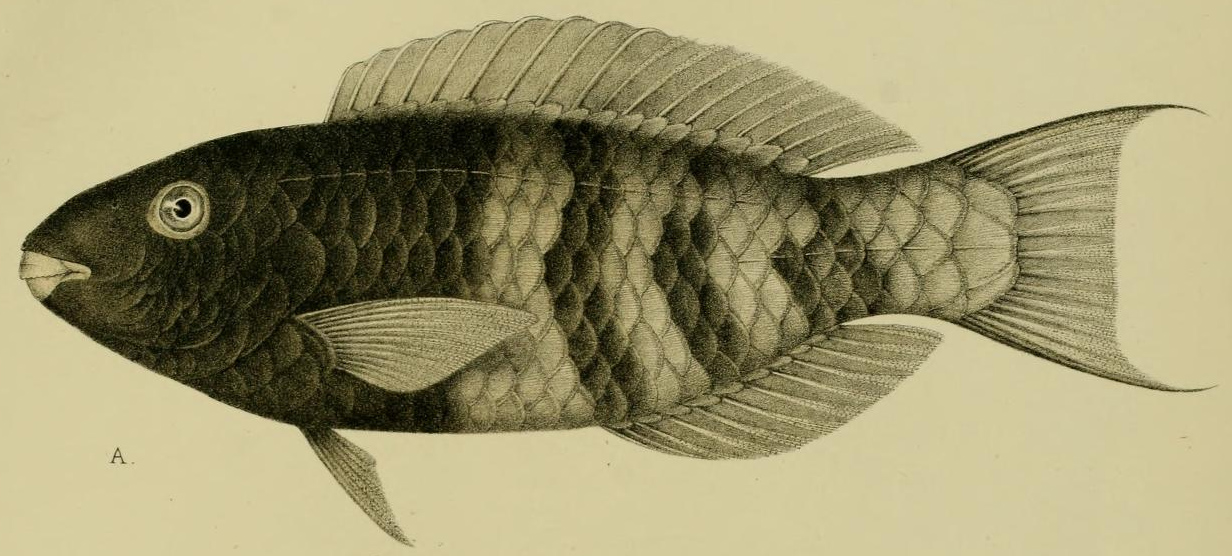

Conservation status
- Least Concern (IUCN 3.1)

Scientific classification
- Kingdom: Animalia
- Phylum: Chordata
- Class: Actinopterygii
- Order: Labriformes
- Family: Labridae
- Genus: Scarus
- Species: S. dimidiatus

Binomial name
- Scarus dimidiatus Bleeker, 1859

Synonyms
- Pseudoscarus dimidiatus (Bleeker, 1859); Callyodon fumifrons Jordan & Seale, 1906; Callyodon zonularis Jordan & Seale, 1906

= Scarus dimidiatus =

Species of fish

Scarus dimidiatus, also known as the yellowbarred parrotfish, is a marine ray-finned fish, a parrotfish from the family Scaridae. It is found in the western Pacific Ocean from Indonesia east to Samoa as far north as the Ryukyu Islands and as far south as the Great Barrier Reef.

== Ecology ==
This species lives in coral-filled waters in protected reefs. This species lives in depths of 1 to 12m.
