= Scarus festivus =

Festive parrotfish

Conservation status
- Least Concern (IUCN 3.1)

Scientific classification
- Kingdom: Animalia
- Phylum: Chordata
- Class: Actinopterygii
- Order: Labriformes
- Family: Labridae
- Genus: Scarus
- Species: S. festivus

Binomial name
- Scarus festivus Valenciennes, 1840

Synonyms
- Callyodon lunula Snyder, 1908; Scarus lunula (Snyder, 1908); Callyodon verweyi de Beaufort, 1940; Margaritodon verweyi (de Beaufort, 1940)

Species of fish

Scarus festivus, the festive parrotfish, is a species of marine ray-finned fish, a parrotfish in the family Scaridae. This species has a wide Indo-Pacific distribution and is found from the coast of East Africa east as far as the Tuamotu islands and north to the Ryukyu Islands of Japan and south to Lord Howe Island, Australia. This is an uncommon species which is found in clear lagoons and off seaward reefs where it grazes on benthic algae.
