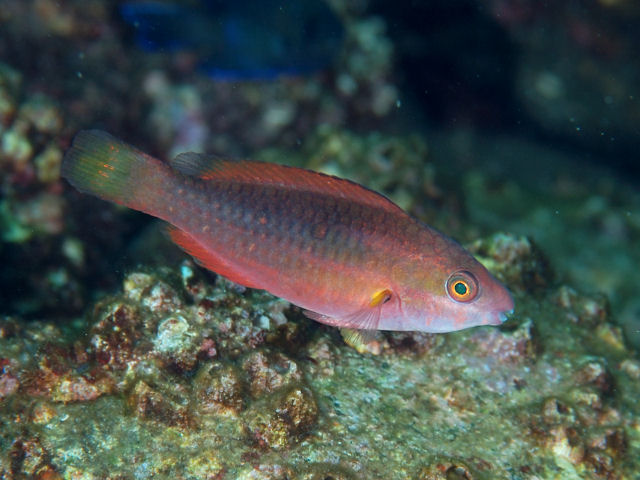

Conservation status
- Least Concern (IUCN 3.1)

Scientific classification
- Kingdom: Animalia
- Phylum: Chordata
- Class: Actinopterygii
- Order: Labriformes
- Family: Labridae
- Genus: Scarus
- Species: S. forsteni

Binomial name
- Scarus forsteni (Bleeker, 1861)

Synonyms
- Pseudoscarus forsteni Bleeker, 1861; Callyodon forsteni (Bleeker, 1861); Callyodon laxtoni Whitley, 1948

= Scarus forsteni =

Species of fish

Scarus forsteni, commonly known as the whitespot parrotfish, or Forsten's parrotfish, is a marine fish native to tropical areas in the western Pacific Ocean, where it lives in coral reefs and feeds on benthic algae. S. forsteni are scrapers, meaning they use their specialized beak-like mouths to scrape algae and other biofilms off ocean surfaces. This is possible due to their jaw physiology, which has a shallow shape and thin cement covering.
