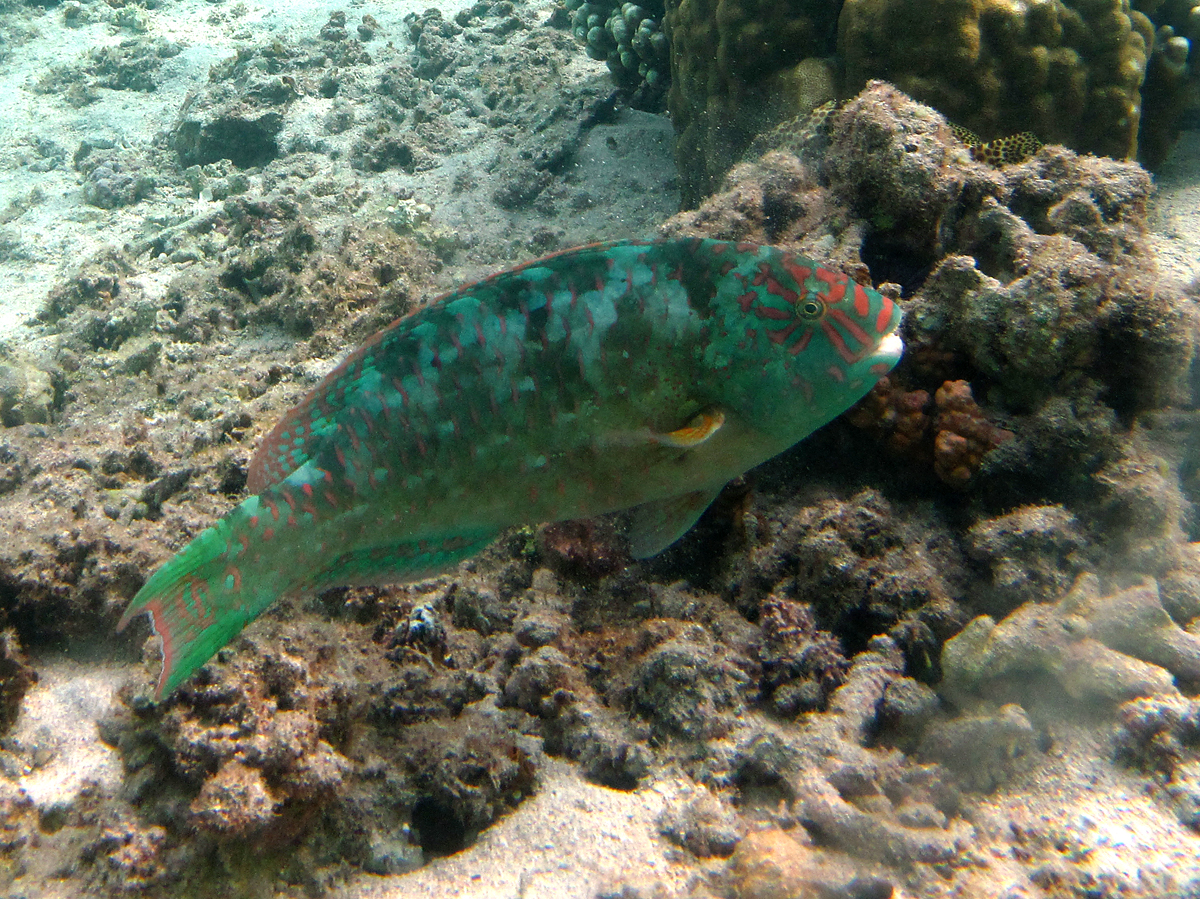
- Male
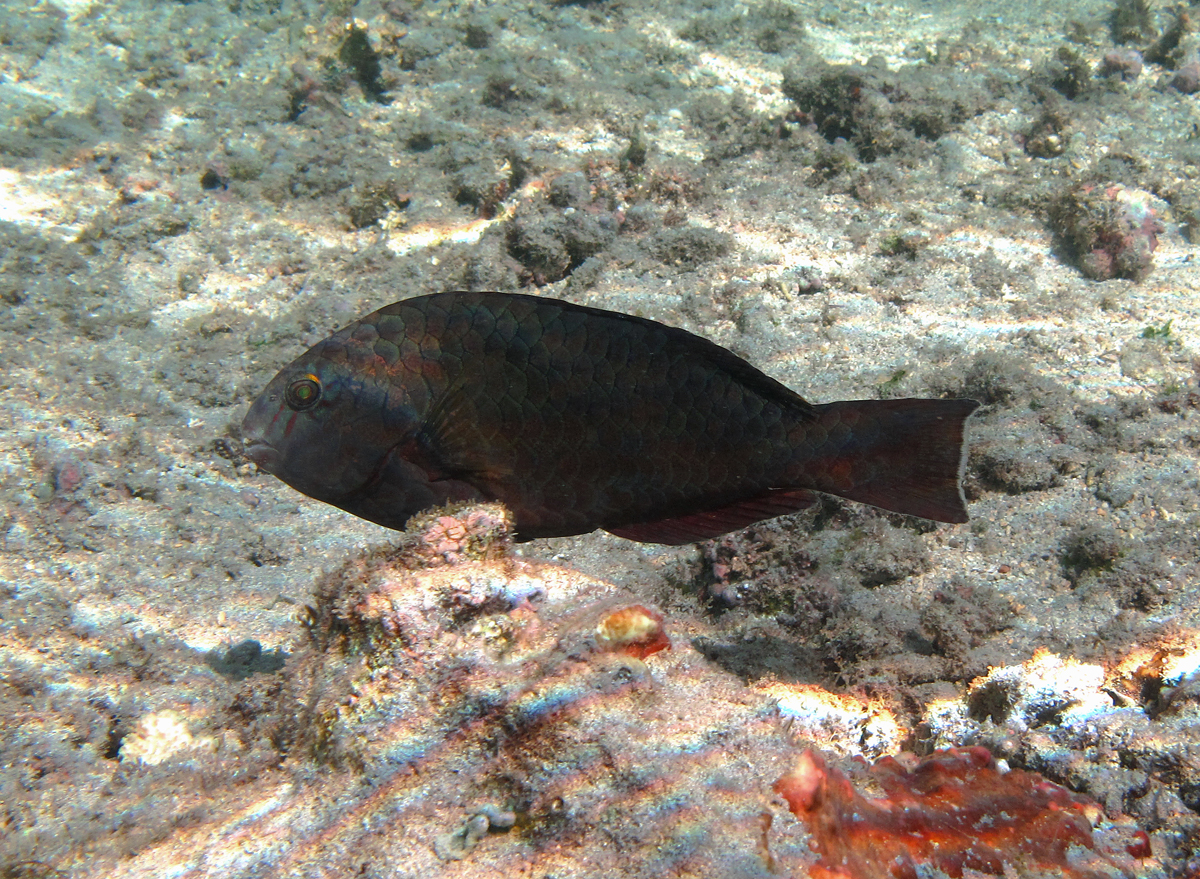
- Female

Conservation status
- Least Concern (IUCN 3.1)

Scientific classification
- Kingdom: Animalia
- Phylum: Chordata
- Class: Actinopterygii
- Order: Labriformes
- Family: Labridae
- Genus: Calotomus
- Species: C. carolinus

Binomial name
- Calotomus carolinus (Valenciennes, 1840)

Synonyms
- Callyodon carolinus Valenciennes, 1840; Callyodon sandwicensis Valenciennes, 1840; Calotomus sandwicensis (Valenciennes, 1840); Callyodon genistriatus Valenciennes, 1840; Callyodon brachysoma Bleeker, 1861; Leptoscarus brachysoma (Bleeker, 1861); Calotomus xenodon Gilbert, 1890; Calotomus irradians Jenkins, 1901; Calotomus snyderi Jenkins, 1903; Scarichthys rarotongae Seale, 1906; Cryptotomus albimarginatus Fourmanoir & Guézé, 1961

= Calotomus carolinus =

Species of fish

Calotomus carolinus, commonly known as Carolines parrotfish, is a species of marine ray-finned fish, a parrotfish, in the family Labridae. It is also known as the starry-eye parrotfish, stareye parrotfish, bucktooth parrotfish, Christmas parrotfish or marbled parrotfish. Since the Calotomus carolinus is known across the Pacific, it also has its own name in many native languages for example, it is called a panuhunuhunu in the Hawaiian language.

== Description ==
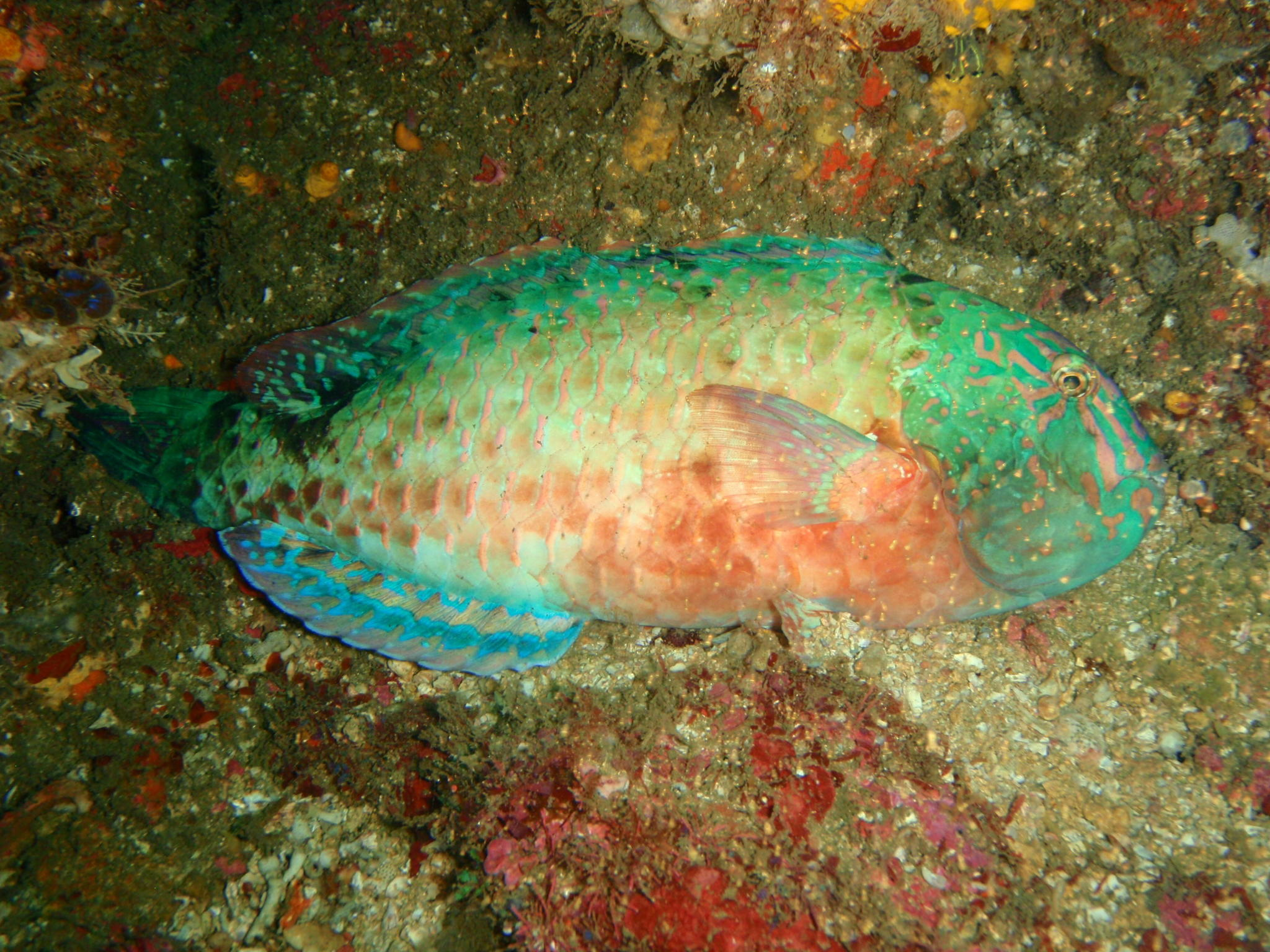
Male, South Africa

The species is about 50 centimetres (20 in) long. The species changes its appearance greatly during the transition to adulthood. Juveniles of the species are typically a mottled orangish-brown, with some pink shading. Adult males, also known as terminal stage, are shades of blue or green, and have pink lines radiating from their eyes. Adult females, also known as the initial phase, are mottled brown and their eyes bulge out slightly. Its jaws consist of pebble-like teeth fused into a beak for eating seaweed, but in juveniles the teeth are not yet fully fused and are visible on the outside of the dental plate.

== Distribution ==
Calotomus carolinus has a wide Indo-Pacific distribution from the coast of East Africa, although not in the Red Sea where it is replaced by Calotomus viridescens, through the Indian Ocean to the eastern Pacific Ocean around the Revillagigedo and the Galapagos Islands.

== Habitat and biology ==
Calotomus carolinus can typically be found as a single fish or in small groups, in shallow reefs or lagoons. It occurs in subtidal reef flats, lagoons and seaward reefs down to depths of 27 metres (89 ft), or more. Within the wider habitat this species can be found in areas of coral, rubble, seagrass and algae. It feeds on a variety of benthic encrusting algae, Padina and seagrasses. they can also be found in small schools, or even by itself. It is a protogynous hermaphrodite The Calotomus carolinus, along with many of its relatives, feeds on the seaweed and algae growing on the coral which is helpful to the reef ecosystems because most of the algae restrict the coral's growth, keeping it from fully maturing.

Like many other parrotfish species, the Carolines parrotfish undergoes sex change.

== Naming and taxonomy ==
Calotomus carolinus was first formally described as Callyodon carolinus in 1840 by the French zoologist Achille Valenciennes (1795-1865) with the type locality given as the Caroline Islands. When Charles Henry Gilbert described the genus Calotomus in 1890 he designated Calotomus xenodon as its type species, thinking that the genus was monotypic, this was later shown to be a synonyms of C. carolinus.
