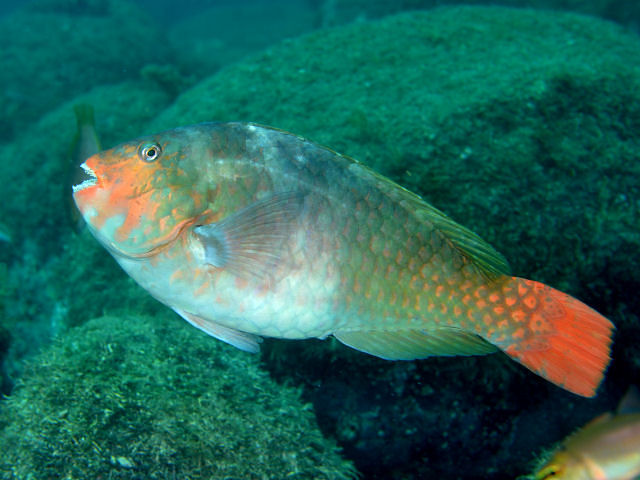

Conservation status
- Least Concern (IUCN 3.1)

Scientific classification
- Kingdom: Animalia
- Phylum: Chordata
- Class: Actinopterygii
- Order: Labriformes
- Family: Labridae
- Genus: Calotomus
- Species: C. japonicus

Binomial name
- Calotomus japonicus (Valenciennes, 1840)

Synonyms
- Callyodon japonicus Valenciennes, 1840; Leptoscarus japonicus (Valenciennes, 1840); Calotomus cyclurus Jenkins, 1903

= Calotomus japonicus =

Species of fish

Calotomus japonicus, commonly known as the Japanese parrotfish, is a species of parrotfish commonly found throughout the northwest Pacific. The species has been classified as Least Concern by the IUCN.

== Distribution and habitat ==
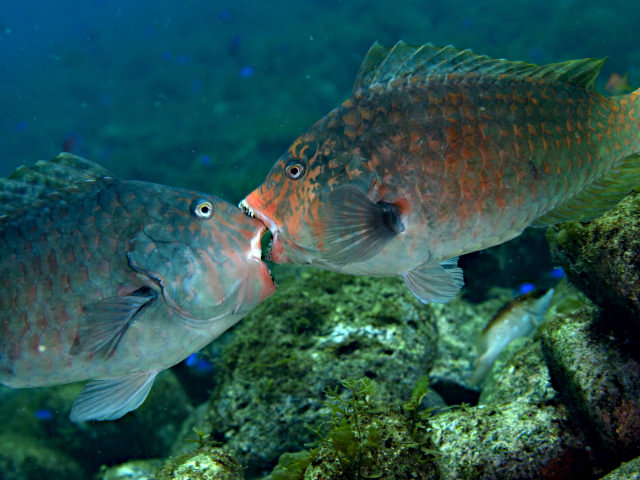
Fighting, in Japan

Calotomus japonicus is found throughout the northwest Pacific Ocean, including southern Japan, South Korea, and Taiwan. The species was once believed to have been seen around northwest Hawaii; however, it was later discovered that the fish that had been spotted were of the C. zonarcha species. Since the fish is common and is not endangered by any major threats, the IUCN has classified the species as Least Concern. However, in southern Japan, and sometimes Taiwan, the species is commonly sold after being caught by gill nets.

Calotomus japonicus is found almost exclusively along the coast. They are typically seen swimming in areas with seaweed and rocks.

== Description ==
The body of the fish is a red-brown color, and is spotted with white and light gray. The species has an interrupted lateral line. Its iris is yellow with a dark brown blotch.

The male C. japonicus is usually 265 millimetres (10.4 in)—345 millimetres (13.6 in) in length, while the female is 202 millimetres (8.0 in)—260 millimetres (10 in) in length. Its maximum length is 390 millimetres (15 in). The species is a protogynous hermaphrodite and a pelagic spawner.

== Gallery ==
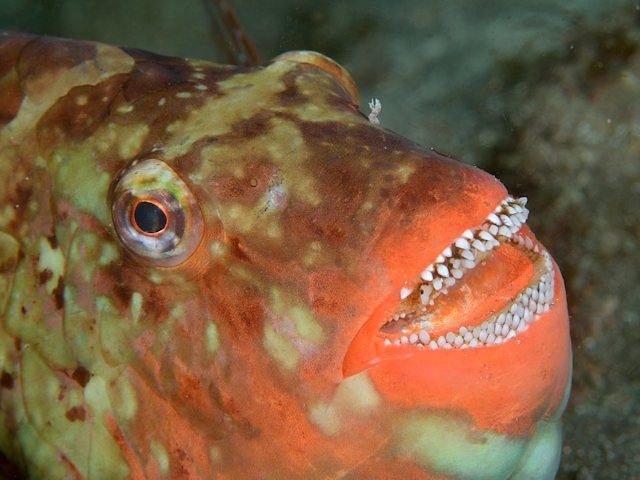

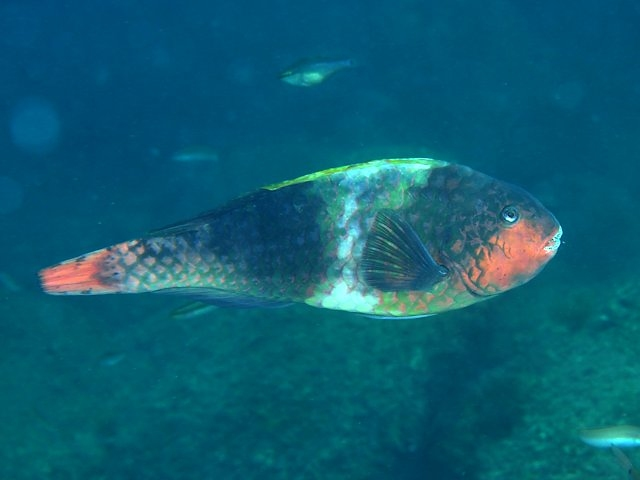

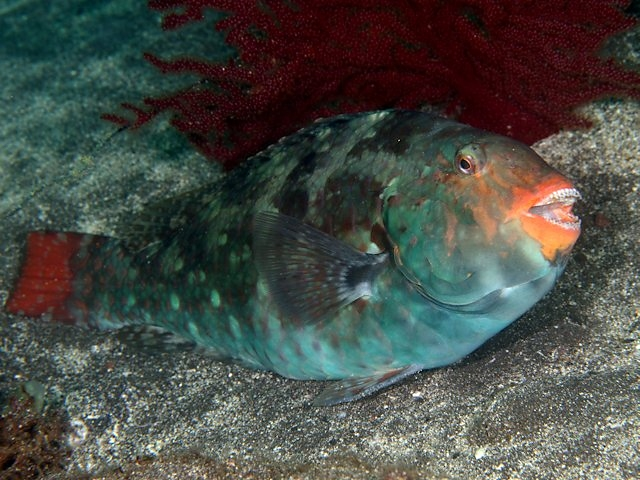

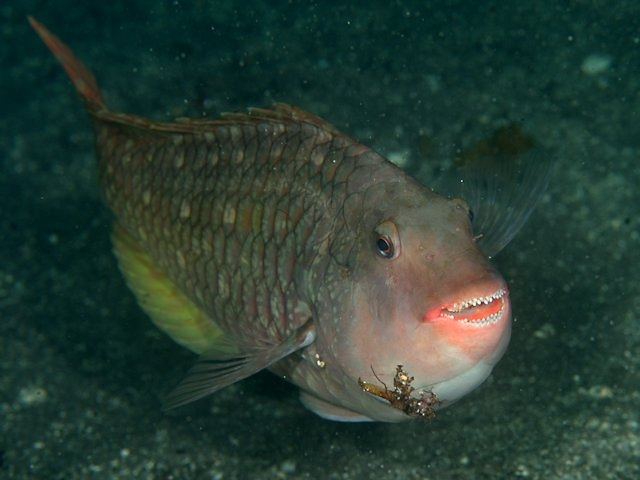

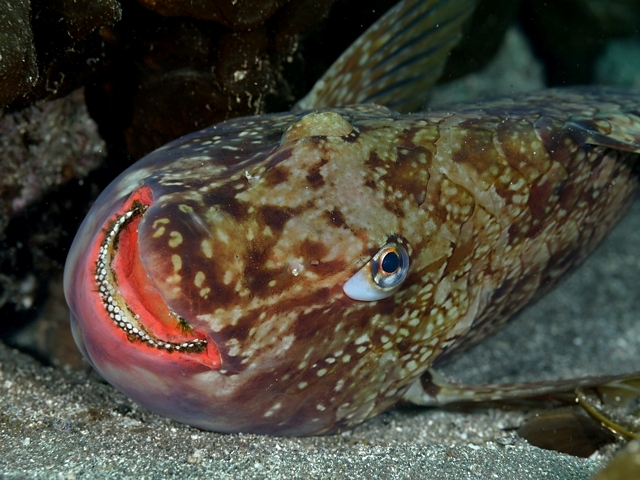
