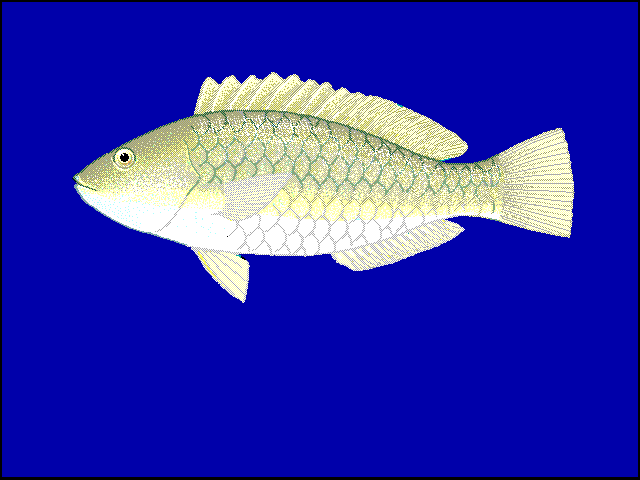

Conservation status
- Least Concern (IUCN 3.1)

Scientific classification
- Kingdom: Animalia
- Phylum: Chordata
- Class: Actinopterygii
- Order: Labriformes
- Family: Labridae
- Genus: Calotomus
- Species: C. spinidens

Binomial name
- Calotomus spinidens (Quoy & Gaimard, 1824)

Synonyms
- Scarus spinidens Quoy & Gaimard, 1824; Callyodon spinidens (Quoy & Gaimard, 1824); Cryptotomus spinidens (Quoy & Gaimard, 1824); Callyodon waigiensis Valenciennes, 1840; Callyodon hypselosoma Bleeker, 1855; Callyodon moluccensis Bleeker, 1861; Leptoscarus moluccensis (Bleeker, 1861)

= Calotomus spinidens =

Species of fish

Calotomus spinidens, the spinytooth parrotfish, is a species of marine ray-finned fish, a parrotfish, in the family Scaridae. It is found in the Indo-Pacific from East Africa to Tonga and the Marshall Islands where it is found in seagrass and weaweedbeds located in coastal bays or deep lagoons. The species is diandric which includes primary males (born male) and larger more aggressive secondary males (sex-changed from female), with smaller primary males sometimes participating in spawning by interfering with pair spawnings of the larger secondary males.
