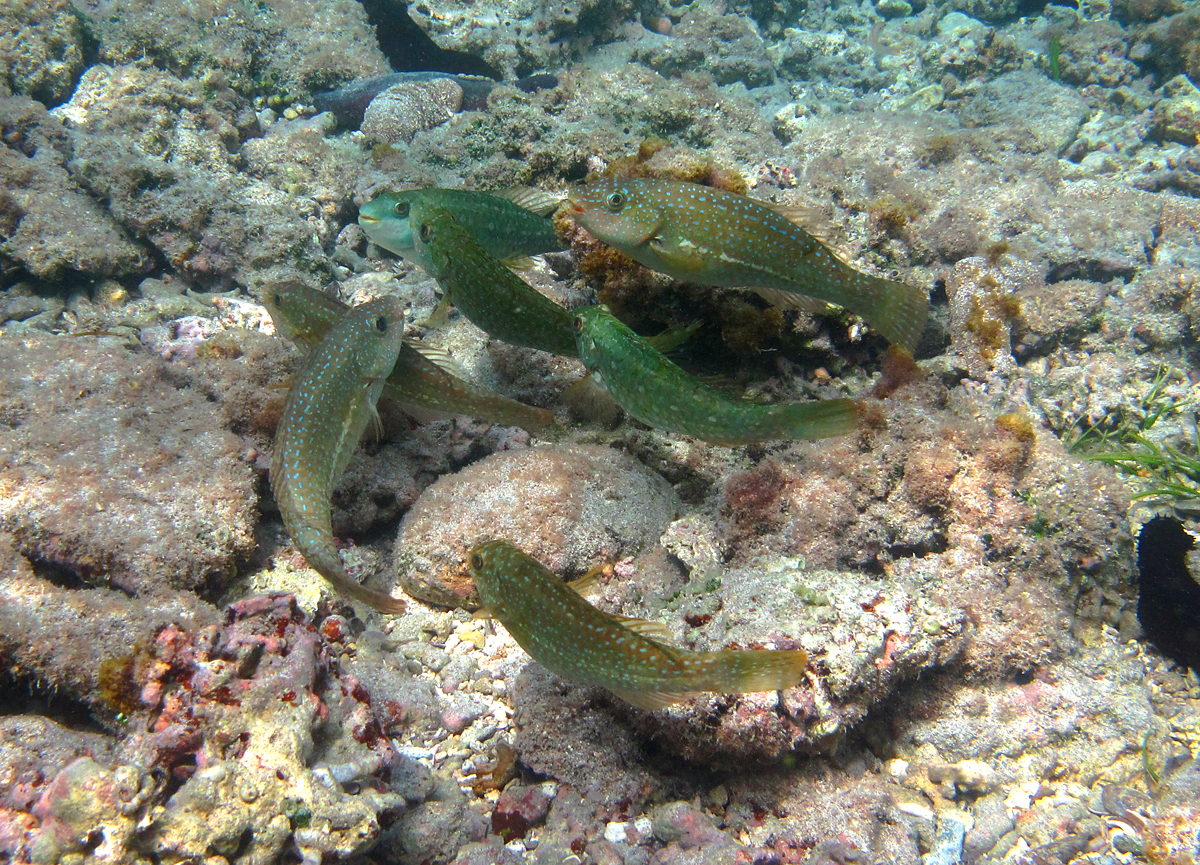
- Males with a whitish line and blue spots along their side, females without

Conservation status
- Least Concern (IUCN 3.1)

Scientific classification
- Kingdom: Animalia
- Phylum: Chordata
- Class: Actinopterygii
- Division: Teleostei
- Order: Labriformes
- Family: Labridae
- Subfamily: Scarinae
- Tribe: Sparisomatini
- Genus: Leptoscarus; Swainson, 1839
- Species: L. vaigiensis

Binomial name
- Leptoscarus vaigiensis (Quoy & Gaimard, 1824)

Synonyms
- List: Scarus vaigiensis Quoy & Gaimard, 1824; Scarus coeruleopunctatus Rüppell, 1835; Leptoscarus coeruleopunctatus (Rüppell, 1835); Scarus naevius Valenciennes, 1840; Scarus auritus Valenciennes, 1840; Scarichthys auritus (Valenciennes, 1840); Scarus rubronotatus Valenciennes, 1840; Scarus bottae Valenciennes, 1840; Calliodon chlorolepis Richardson, 1844

= Marbled parrotfish =

Species of ray-finned fish

The marbled parrotfish (Leptoscarus vaigiensis), also known as the seagrass parrotfish, is a species of parrotfish, the only known member of the genus Leptoscarus. It has a wide Indo-Pacific distribution and is also found in the southeastern Atlantic Ocean. It is a coastal species found in beds of sea grass and seaweed.

== Taxonomy ==
The marbled parrotfish was first formally described as Scarus vaigiensis in 1824 by the French naval surgeons and naturalists Jean René Constant Quoy (1790–1869) and Joseph Paul Gaimard (1793–1858) in their book Voyage autour du monde. The type locality was given as Waigeo. William Swainson created the genus Leptoscarus in 1839 and L. viagiensis is the only species in this monospecific genus.

== Distribution ==
The marbled parrotfish has a wide Indo-Pacific distribution from the northern Red Sea south along the eastern coast of Africa to the Cape of Good Hope and eastwards through the Indian Ocean and Pacific Ocean to Easter Island. In the Pacific Ocean its range extends north to Japan and south to Rottnest Island off Western Australia and the Poor Knights Islands of New Zealand. In the southeastern Atlantic this species is found in False Bay in the Western Cape, South Africa.

Its distribution is largely anti-equatorial (i.e., found in both the Southern and Northern Hemispheres, but rare or absent near the Equator).

== Description ==
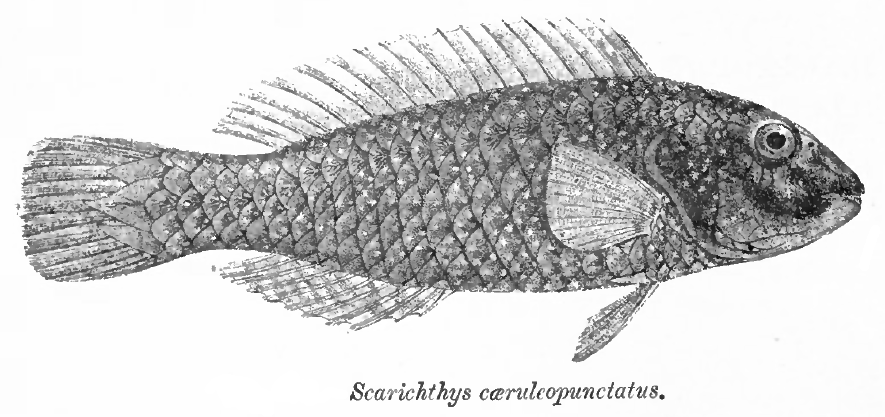
Drawing by Francis Day

The marbled parrotfish is brown to green with darker mottling on the back fading to yellow or greenish ventrally. The males are marked with a pale longitudinal strip along their flanks and the head, body, dorsal fin and anal fin are marked with small blue spots. The females are mottled brown and white. On the head the females have broad bands which radiate from the eyes. This species has 9 spines and 10 soft rays in the dorsal fin while the anal fin has 3 spines and 9 soft rays and there are 13 rays in the pectoral fin. The distinctive narrow dental plates are fused into a parrot-like beak and are covered in numerous small teeth. When its mouth is closed the upper jaw teeth are enclosed by the lower jaw. This species can attain a maximum total length of 35 cm (14 in).

== Habitat and biology ==
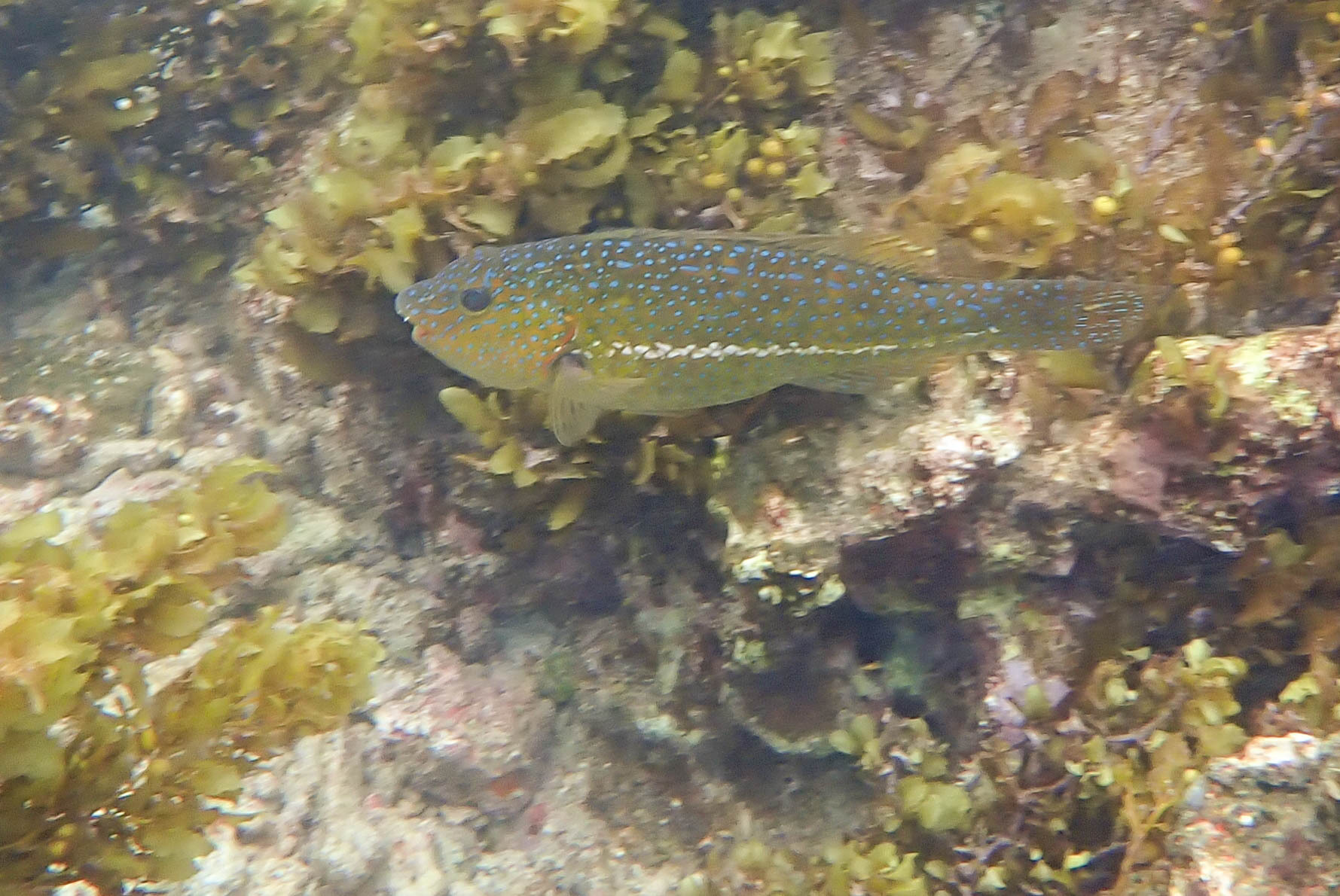
Male, in the Seychelles

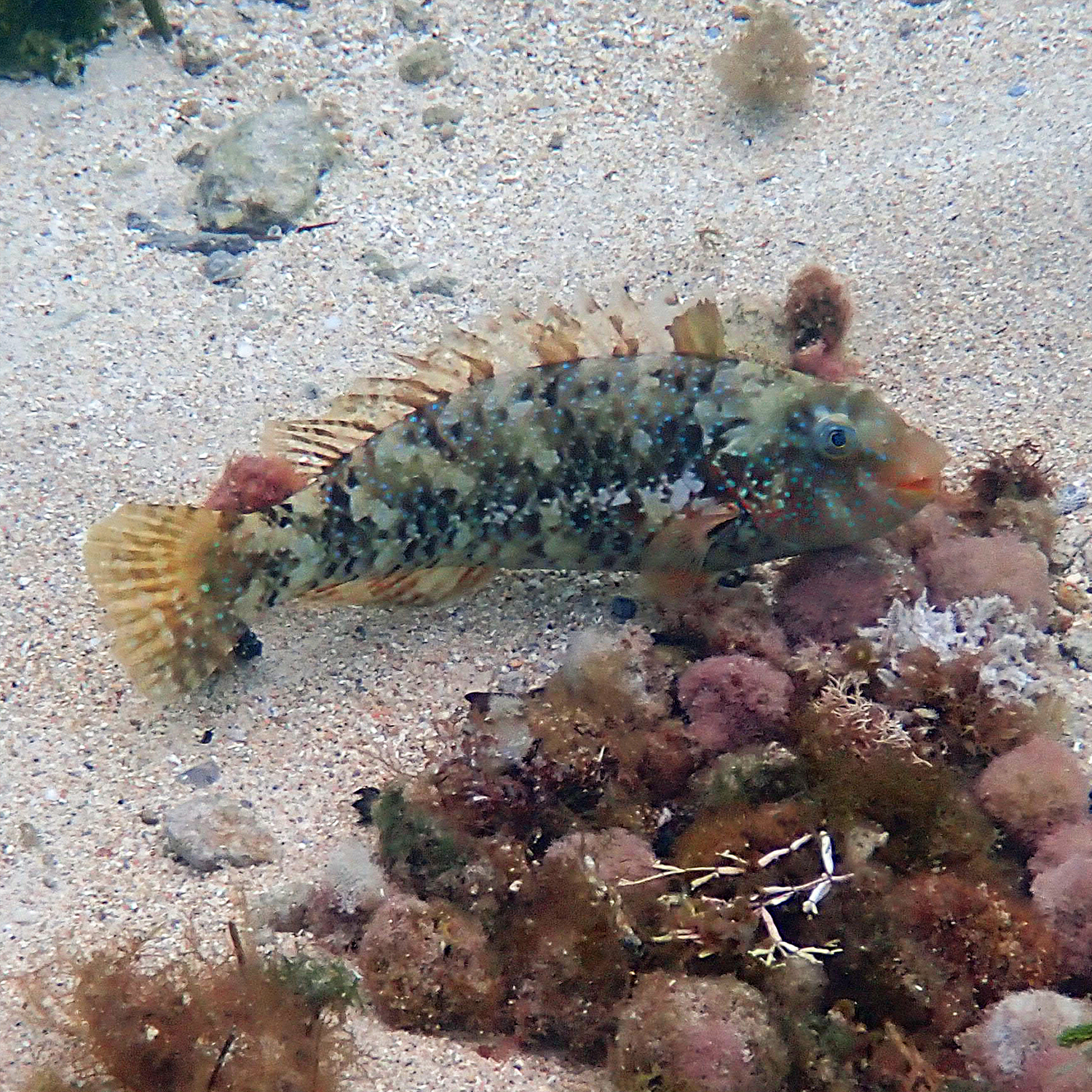
Male, at Norfolk Island

The marbled parrotfish lives in sheltered bays, harbours and lagoons among seagrass beds and algal-covered reefs. It normally occurs in small groups. It ranges in depth from 0–15 metres (0–49 ft). Uniquely among parrotfish, females never change sex to males; they are gonochoristic. Spawning occurs in shallow water over flat seagrass beds on the ebbing tide. As well as being gonochoristic, marbled parrotfish also show less sexual dimorphism than most other parrotfishes. Their diet consists of sea grass and algae. The larvae of the marbled parrotfish are associated with drifting algae.

== Human usage ==
The marbled parrotfish is caught in local artisanal fisheries and it is normally marketed fresh. In Queensland there is a limit of 5 marbled parrotfishes in a maximum bag of 20 coral reef fishes and they must be no less than 25 centimetres (9.8 in) long.
