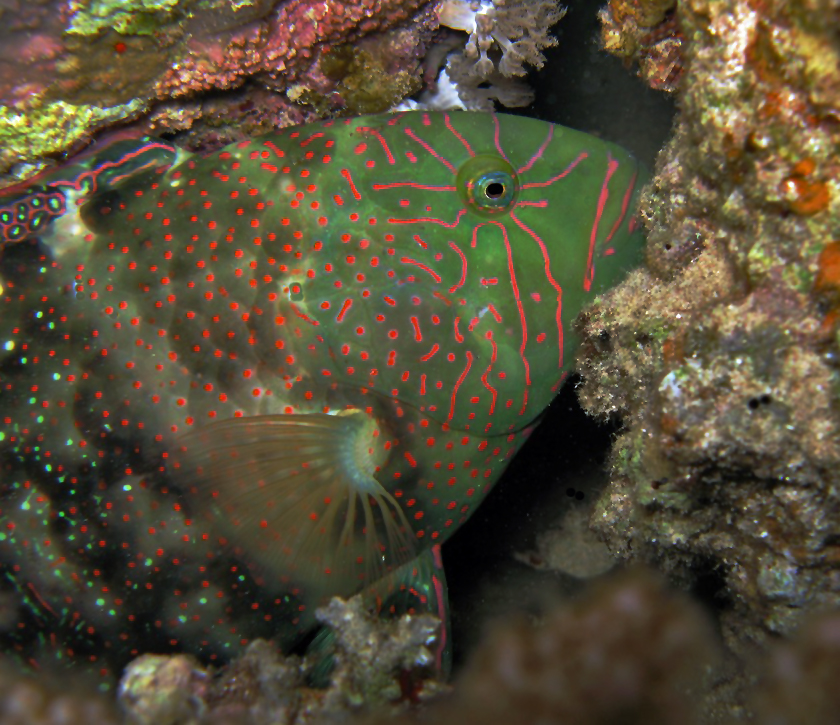

Conservation status
- Least Concern (IUCN 3.1)

Scientific classification
- Kingdom: Animalia
- Phylum: Chordata
- Class: Actinopterygii
- Order: Labriformes
- Family: Labridae
- Genus: Calotomus
- Species: C. viridescens

Binomial name
- Calotomus viridescens (Rüppell, 1835)

Synonyms
- Scarus viridescens Rüppell, 1835; Callyodon viridescens (Rüppell, 1835)

= Calotomus viridescens =

Species of fish

Calotomus viridescens, commonly known as the viridescent- or dotted parrotfish, is a species of parrotfish native to the waters of the Maldives and Red Sea, from the Gulf of Aqaba to south to the Chagos Archipelago. It was described by the German naturalist Eduard Rüppell in 1835.

== Gallery ==
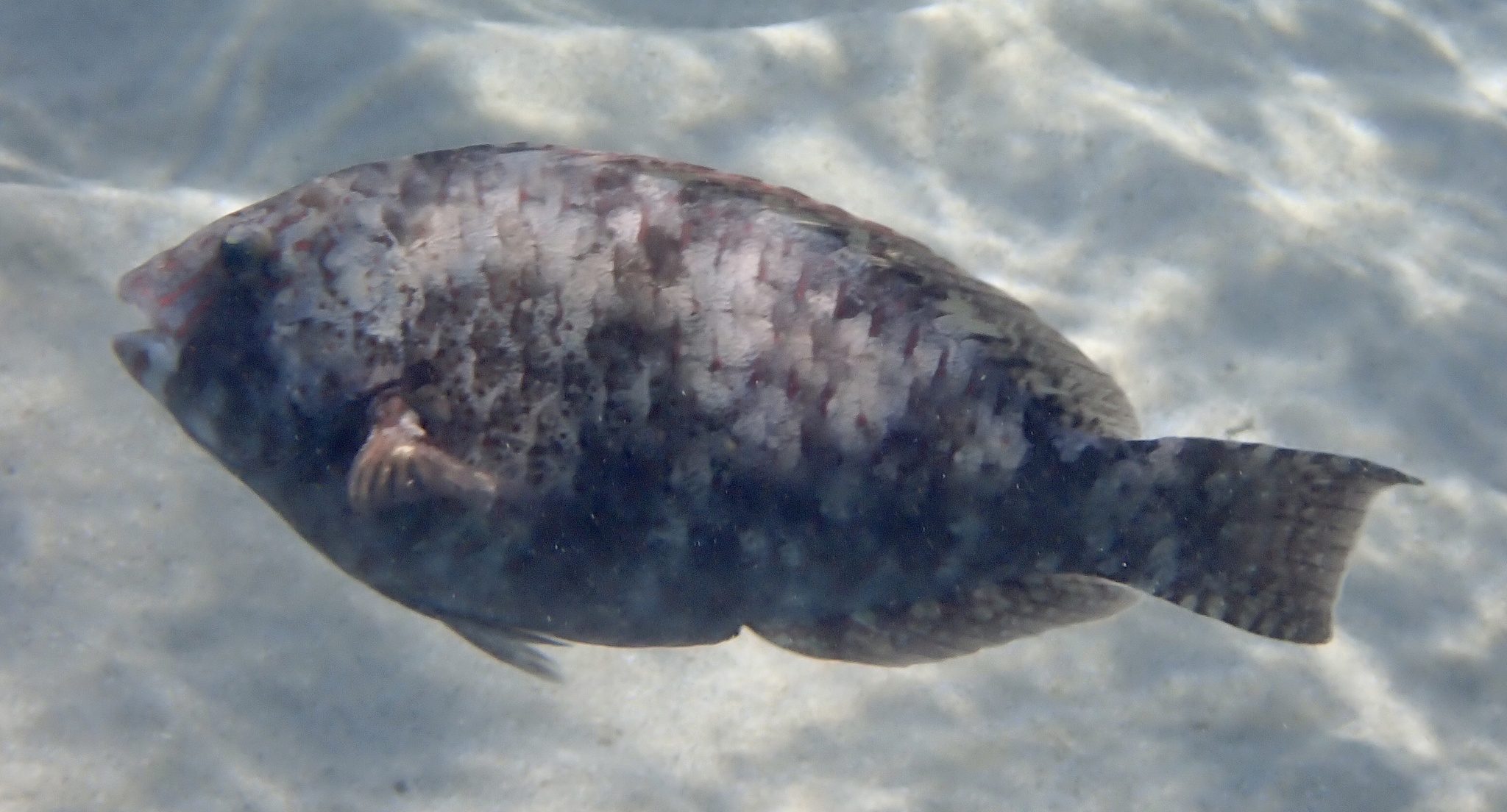
Initial phase

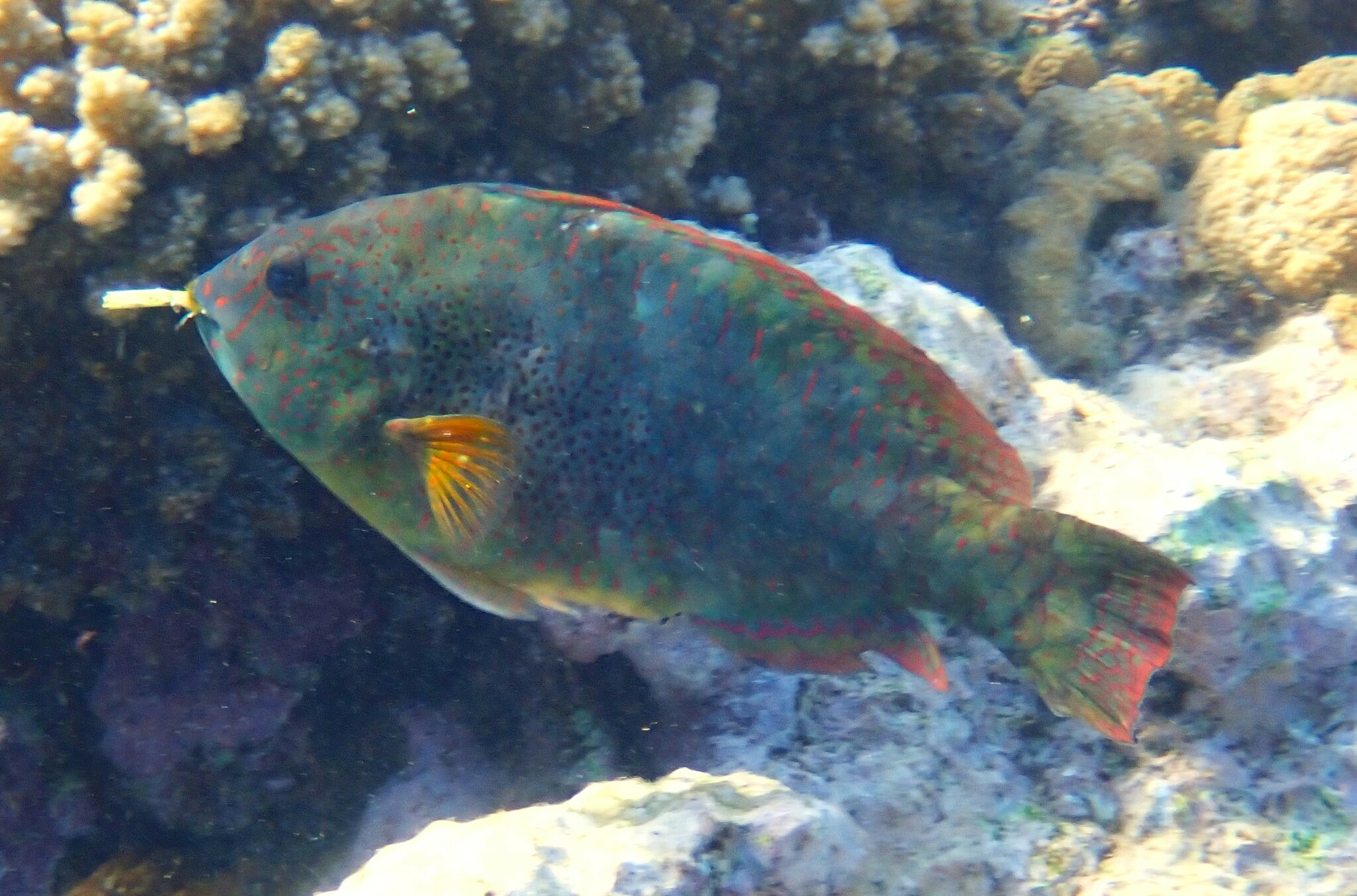
Terminal phase
