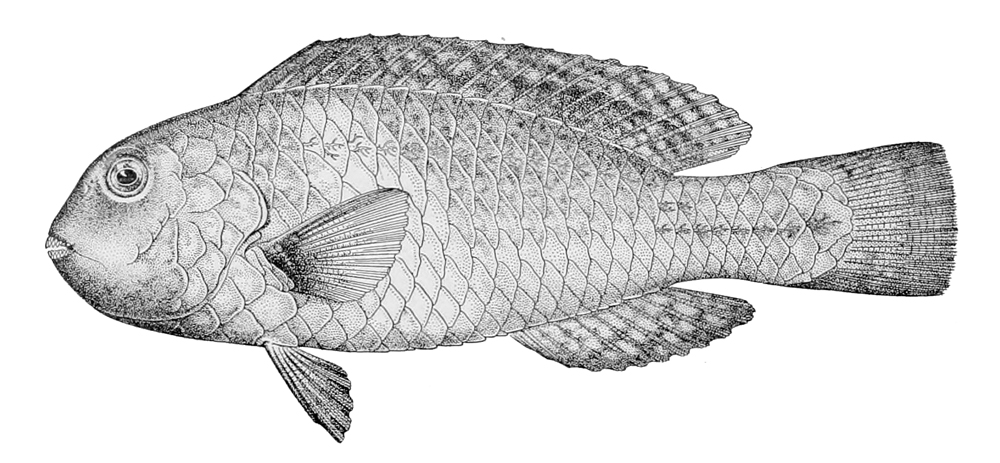

Conservation status
- Least Concern (IUCN 3.1)

Scientific classification
- Kingdom: Animalia
- Phylum: Chordata
- Class: Actinopterygii
- Order: Labriformes
- Family: Labridae
- Genus: Calotomus
- Species: C. zonarchus

Binomial name
- Calotomus zonarchus O. P. Jenkins, 1903

Synonyms
- Scaridea zonarcha Jenkins, 1903; Calotomus zonarcha (Jenkins, 1903); Scaridea balia Jenkins, 1903; Scaridea aerosa Jordan & Snyder, 1907; Scaridea farrandi Jordan, 1925

= Calotomus zonarchus =

Species of fish

Calotomus zonarchus, commonly known as yellowbar parrotfish, is a species of parrotfish native to the waters of the Hawaiian Islands.

== Description ==
These species, which can grow to surpass 30 cm (one foot) in length, are herbivorous. They are hermaphrodite protogynous. Yellowbar Parrotfish have rough jaws of fused pebble-like teeth that scrape the stiff seaweed. Males are greenish-gray with a yellow bar, white spots, and white dots behind the pectoral fin, and females are mottled gray-brown with tiny white dots and a pale bar behind the pectoral fins. Females also have red cheeks.

== Distribution and habitat ==
Hawaii is home to spectacled parrotfish. Yellowbar parrotfish are only found in the Northwestern Hawaiian Islands starting from O'ahu and moving northwest. The Yellowbar Parrotfish lives about 10 meters deep. They are reef-associated fish living in tropical waters. Calotomus zonarchus is common in the Northwestern Hawaiian Islands.

== Human use and cultural significance ==
The human use of the Yellowbar Parrotfish are the species being in aquariums for commercial reasons. Fishing for this type of fish has caused the population to decline in size and population. The Yellowbar Parrotfish was hunted before for food back then. Hawaiians would hunt and fish for cultural practices. Calotomus zonarchus was a popular fish that was pursued due to its taste, and the fish was easily hunted due to its color.

== Conservation and threats ==
The objectives of conservation efforts are to lessen the risk of extinction by protecting not only the current populations but also establishing new populations. Regulations specify a 12-inch minimum catch size (30 centimeters). Specific conservation measures include preserving healthy populations with suitable fishing laws and education, in addition to common statewide and island conservation measures. Reproductive data should be used to support management based on minimum size limitations, with size restrictions set to guarantee that at least a portion of the population of each species fished reaches sexual maturity prior to being subjected to fishing pressure. Combining species with varying sexual maturities and likely quite varied life histories and reproductive strategies under the same size limit management approach is improper. These fish are exposed to fishing pressure to varying degrees depending on the human population density on Oahu, where fishing pressure is most potent. Larger species are also more frequently targeted than smaller species. Both commercial and recreational fishing is done on them. Because members of this family spend the night in exposed reef crevices that are covered in a thin layer of mucus that they create, they are sensitive to nighttime spear fishing.
