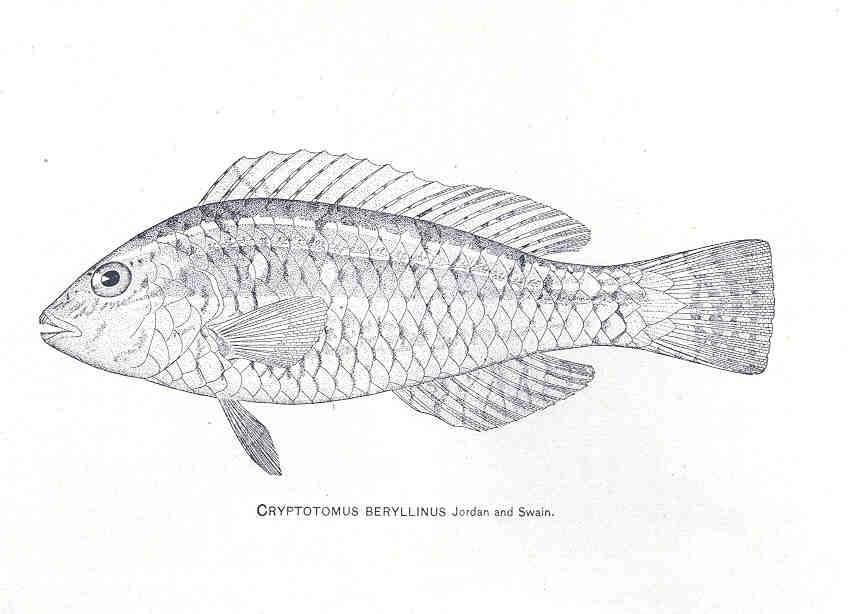
- Nicholsina usta

Scientific classification
- Kingdom: Animalia
- Phylum: Chordata
- Class: Actinopterygii
- Division: Teleostei
- Order: Labriformes
- Family: Labridae
- Tribe: Sparisomatini
- Genus: Nicholsina; Fowler, 1915

Type species
- Cryptotomus beryllinus (as a synonym of Nicholsina usta) Jordan & Swain, 1884

= Nicholsina =

Genus of ray-finned fishes

Nicholsina is a genus of marine ray-finned fishes, parrotfishes from the family Labridae. They are found in the Atlantic and eastern Pacific Oceans. The generic name honours the American ichthyologist John Treadwell Nichols (1883-1958) who was curator of fishes at the American Museum of Natural History. The fish also secretes snot to make a soft net to rest in, and protect itself.

== Species ==
There are currently three species classified in the genus:

- Nicholsina collettei Schultz 1968
- Nicholsina denticulata (Evermann & Radcliffe, 1917) (Loosetooth parrotfish)
- Nicholsina usta (Valenciennes, 1840) (Emerald parrotfish)
