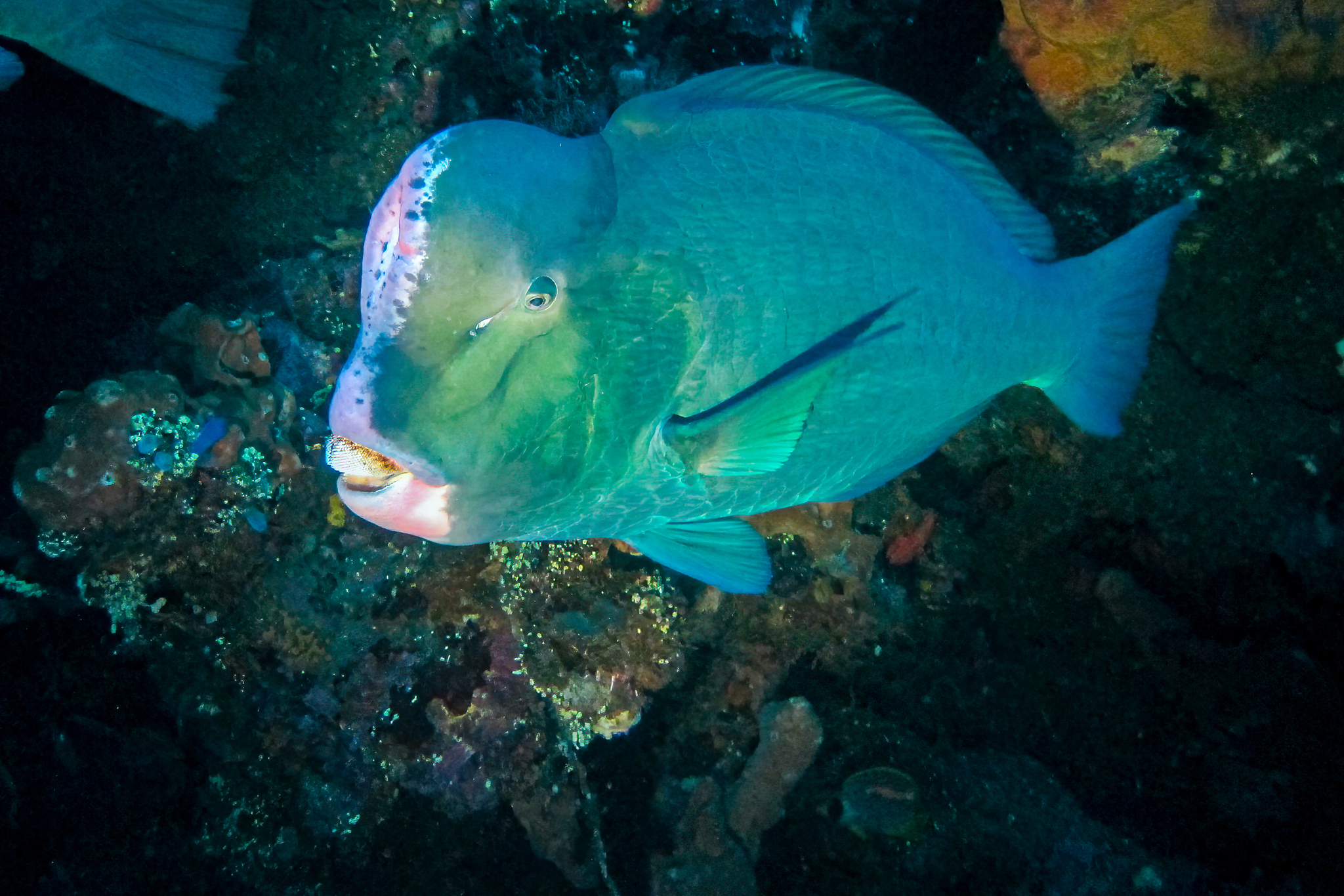

Conservation status
- Vulnerable (IUCN 3.1)

Scientific classification
- Kingdom: Animalia
- Phylum: Chordata
- Class: Actinopterygii
- Division: Teleostei
- Order: Labriformes
- Family: Labridae
- Subfamily: Scarinae
- Tribe: Scarini
- Genus: Bolbometopon; J. L. B. Smith, 1956
- Species: B. muricatum

Binomial name
- Bolbometopon muricatum (Valenciennes, 1840)

Synonyms
- Scarus muricatus Valenciennes, 1840; Bolbometopon muricatus (Valenciennes, 1840); Callyodon muricatus (Valenciennes, 1840)

= Green humphead parrotfish =

Green humphead parrotfish Temporal range: Late Miocene–present

Species of ray-finned fish

The green humphead parrotfish (Bolbometopon muricatum) is the largest species of parrotfish, growing to lengths of 1.3 m (4.3 ft) and weighing up to 46 kg (101 lb), though some sources report a total length of 1.5 m (4 ft 11 in) and weight of 75 kg (165 lb). It is the only species in the monotypic genus Bolbometopon. Fossil remains of Bolbometopon sp. are known from the Late Miocene of Sri Lanka.

Other common names include bumphead parrotfish, humphead parrotfish, double-headed parrotfish, buffalo parrotfish, and giant parrotfish.

It inhabits reefs in the Indian and Pacific Oceans, from the Red Sea in the west to Samoa in the east, and from the Yaeyama Islands in the north to the Great Barrier Reef, Australia, in the south. In regions that are not overfished, the humphead parrotfish is a prominent member of the ecosystem, whether through their social interactions or their feeding behavior.

== Distribution and habitat ==
Humphead parrotfish are generally found in the Indian and Pacific oceans, as far as the great barrier reef, covering Samoa, Japan, and the red sea. They live in areas from the surface down as far as 40 meters. Juveniles like to stay in shallower areas, where adults usually stray farther out into deeper waters.

== Description ==
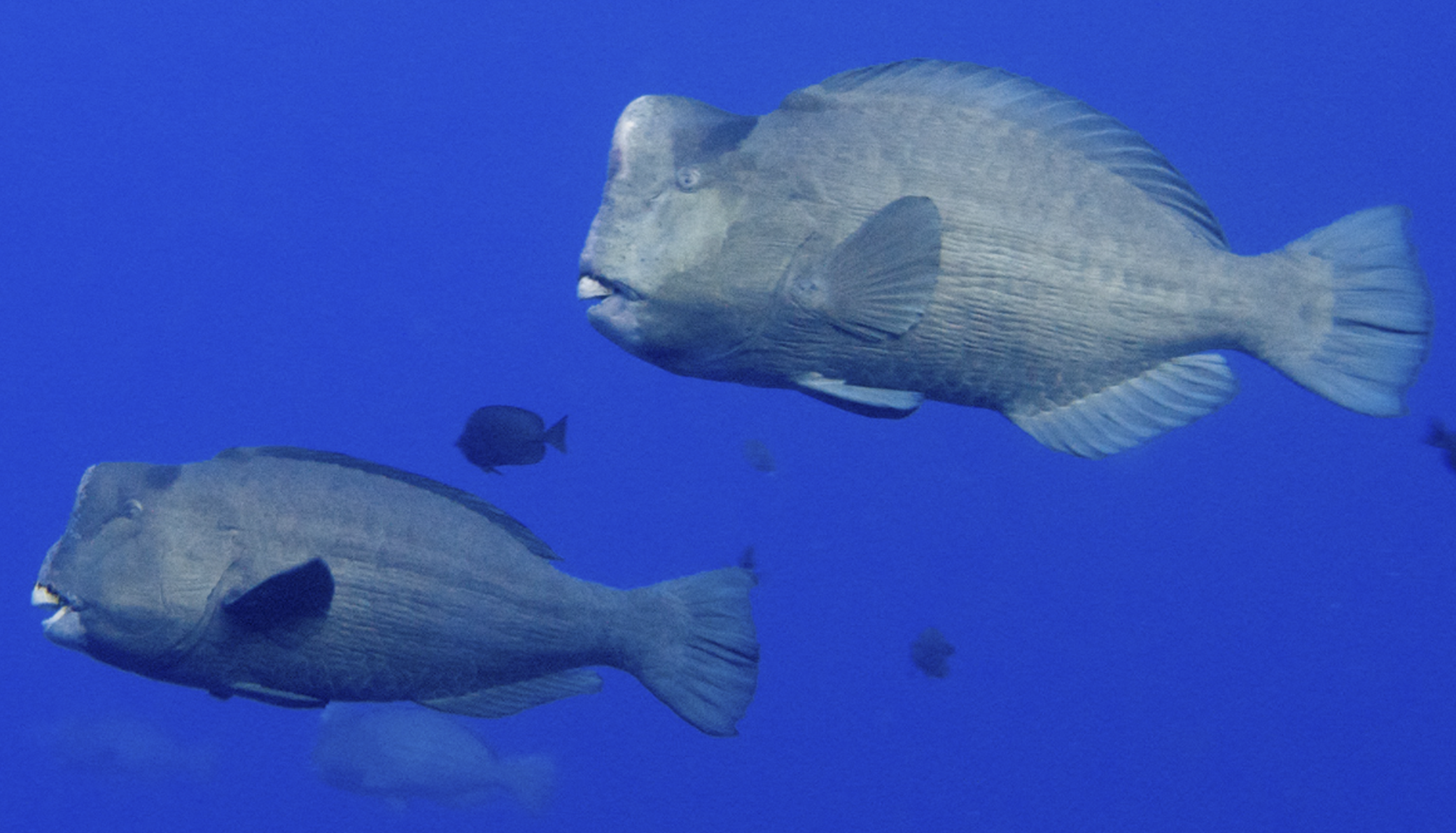
Male (top) and female (bottom)

Unlike typical wrasse, it has a vertical head profile, and unlike other parrotfishes, it is uniformly covered with scales except for the leading edge of the head, which is often light green to pink. Primary phase colouration is a dull gray with scattered white spots, gradually becoming uniformly dark green. This species does not display sex-associated patterns of color change common in the wrasse family Labridae. The adult develops a bulbous forehead sometimes described as an "ossified ridge", and the tooth plates are exposed, being only partly covered by lips.

This species is gregarious and usually occurs in small schools, but group size can be quite large on seaward and clear outer lagoon reefs, exceeding 75 individuals. Records from the 1970s suggest even larger schools of up to 250 individual fish.

== Biology ==
Ritualized headbutting of males, at Wake Atoll

Green humphead parrotfish feed on benthic algae and live corals; they are alleged to ram their head against corals to facilitate feeding. Each adult fish ingests over five tons of structural reef carbonates per year, contributing significantly to the bioerosion of reefs; they are often regarded as a keystone species due to this behavior. These fish sleep among corals, in caves and shipwrecks at night, usually in large groups.

Ritualized combat between male Bolbometopon are sometimes observed: the males charge at one another, and collide head-on with enough force to make "loud jarring sounds". The pair immediately continue combat through attempted biting of the other fish's body. The head humps facilitate these ramming contests, having been compared to the horns of bighorn sheep. More frequently though, contests between males take the form of parallel swimming, akin to land ungulates, where two males move side by side to assess one another. These behaviors are associated with spawning, occurring mostly on days with observed spawning bouts.

=== Life cycle ===
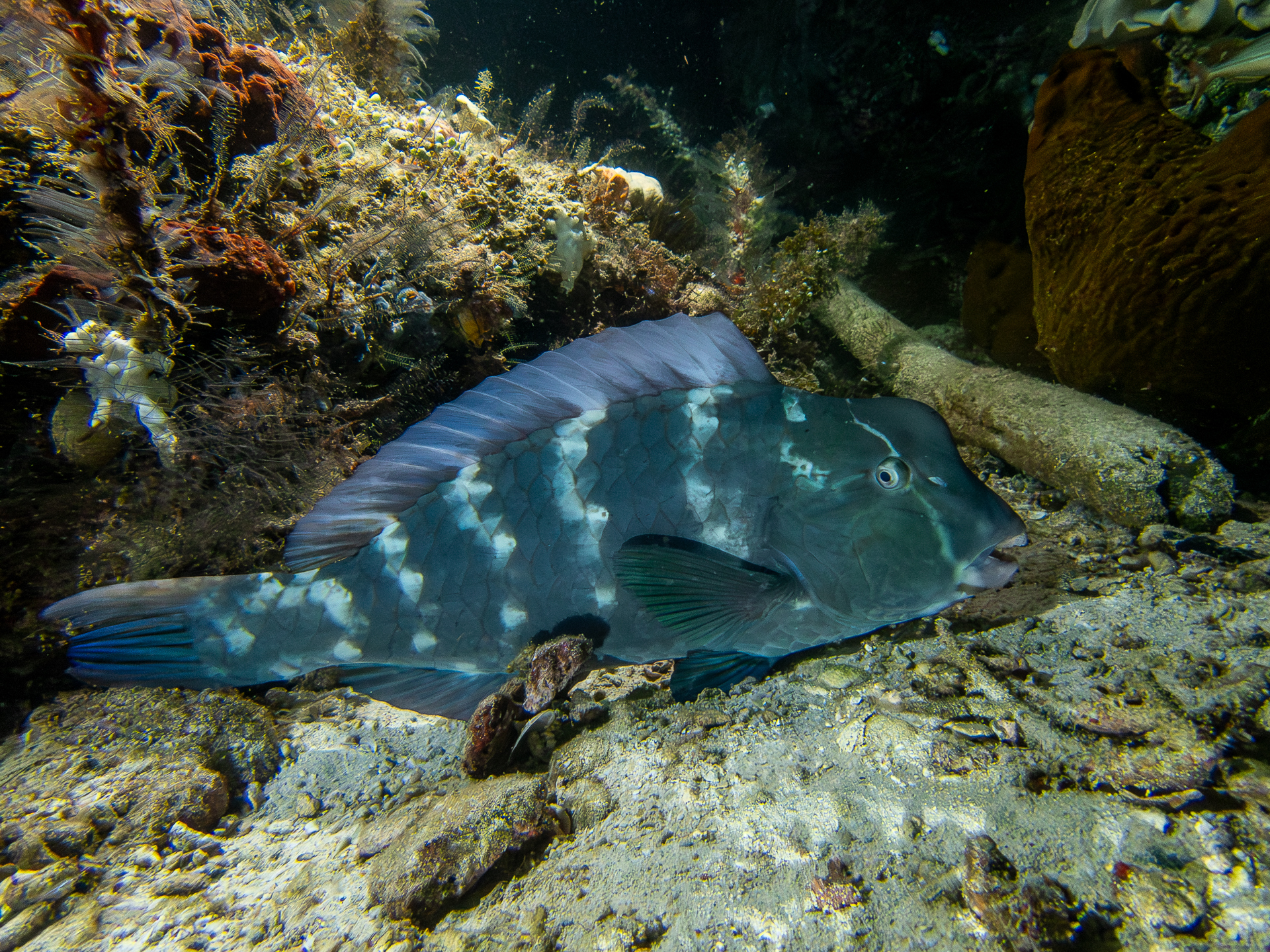
Juvenile, in Indonesia

The green humphead parrotfish is slow-growing and long-lived (up to 40 years), with delayed reproduction and low replenishment rates. They are sexually monochromatic, i.e. there is no initial or terminal phase in the life cycle of the adults. The fish spawn pelagically near the outer reef slope or near promontories, gutters, or channel mouths during a lunar cycle, usually spawning just prior to the new moon. They make use of spawning aggregation sites.

Newly settled juveniles are found in branching coral habitats (primarily Acropora) in sheltered lagoons. Small juveniles (<50 mm) are often associated with damselfish. Larger juvenile green humphead parrotfish are found in lagoons, often in seagrass beds, and the adults are found in clear outer lagoons and sea-ward reefs up to a depth of 30 m (98 ft).

== Conservation ==
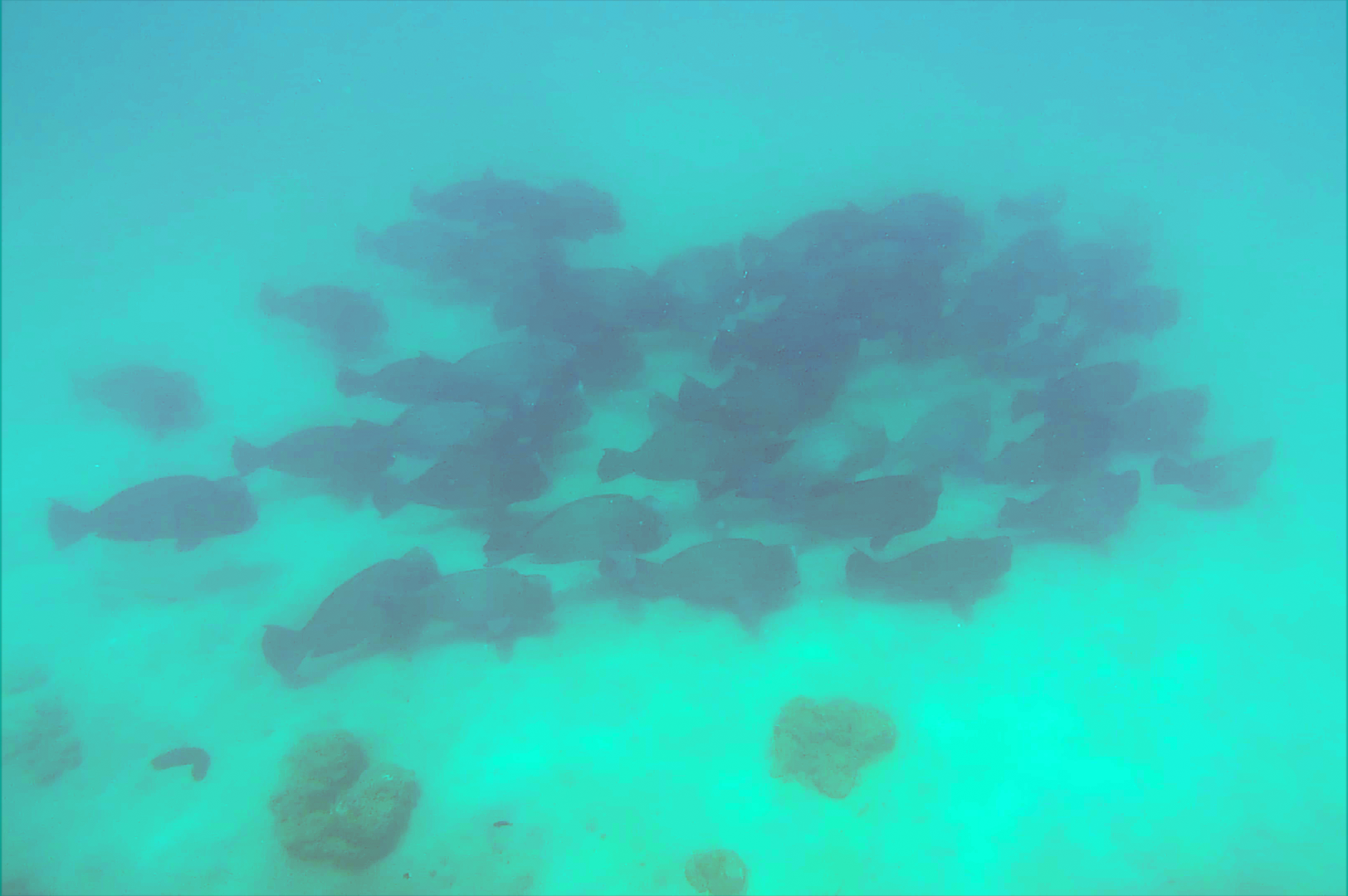
Large schools were historically targeted by fishers, which greatly reduced the population

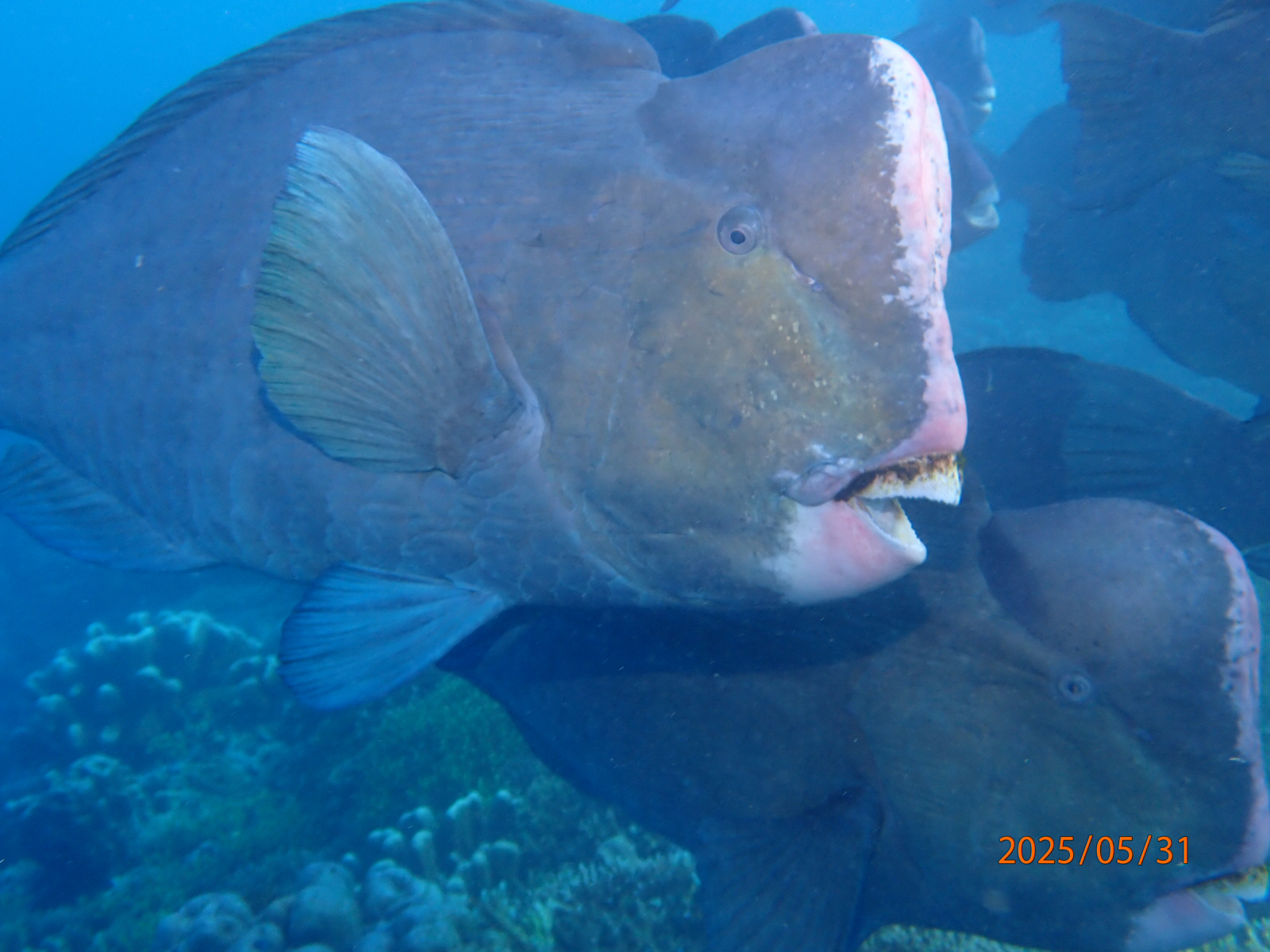
In Malaysia

The large size, slow growth and schooling behavior of this species mean it is susceptible to overfishing. This species is highly sought after by fishermen throughout its range, and it has declined from overharvesting. Spearfishers and netters have targeted large groups as they sleep at night. Additionally, habitat degradation and destruction has accelerated the decline. Juvenile habitats are susceptible to being degraded by poor water quality, such as run-off of sediments from logging.

Spearfishing while scuba diving was banned in American Samoa in 2001. The waters surrounding Wake Island, Johnston Atoll, and Palmyra Atoll from the shoreline out to 50 fathoms (91 m) are protected as low-use marine protected areas, which means any person of the United States fishing for, taking, or retaining this fish must have a special permit. Also, it may not be taken by means of spearfishing with SCUBA gear from 6 pm to 6 am in the US Exclusive Economic Zone waters around these territories. The population of the fish in Palau is now protected by an export ban.

The species was identified as a Species of concern by NOAA/NMFS in 2004, meaning that the species is thought to be threatened, but insufficient data are available to justify a listing under the Endangered Species Act.
