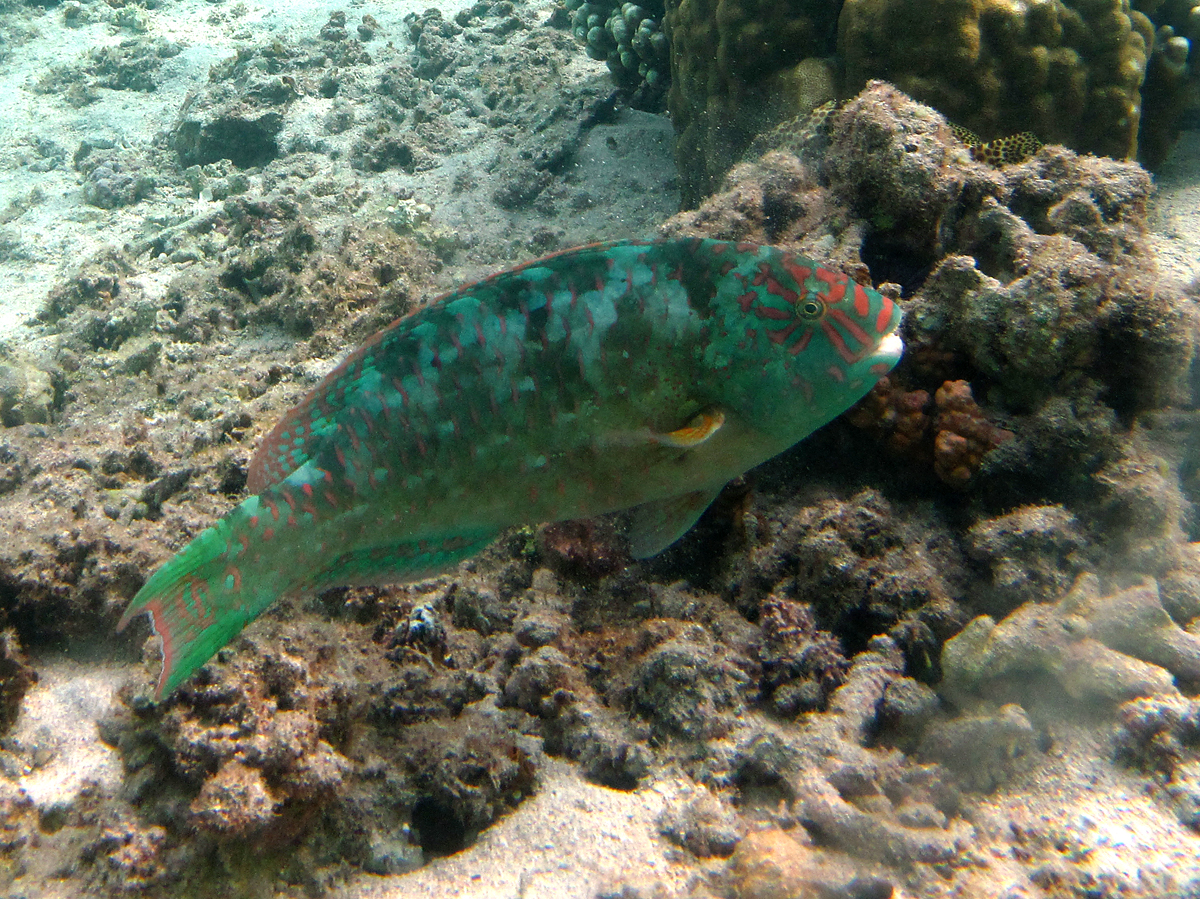
- Carolines parrotfish (C. carolinus)

Scientific classification
- Kingdom: Animalia
- Phylum: Chordata
- Class: Actinopterygii
- Order: Labriformes
- Family: Labridae
- Tribe: Sparisomatini
- Genus: Calotomus; Gilbert, 1890

Type species
- Calotomus xenodon Gilbert, 1890

Species
- 5 extant, see text

= Calotomus =

Calotomus Temporal range: Middle Miocene to present

Genus of ray-finned fishes

Calotomus is a parrotfish genus from the Indo-Pacific, with a single species ranging into the warmer parts of the east Pacific. Compared to most of their relatives, their colours are relatively dull. Several species in this genus are associated with sea grass beds, but most can also be seen at reefs.

== Species ==
The genus includes these extant species:

Species	Common name	Image
Calotomus carolinus (Valenciennes, 1840)	Carolines parrotfish	
Calotomus japonicus (Valenciennes, 1840)	Japanese parrotfish	
Calotomus spinidens (Quoy & Gaimard, 1824)	Spinytooth parrotfish	
Calotomus viridescens (Rüppell, 1835)	Viridescent parrotfish	
Calotomus zonarchus (Jenkins, 1903)	Yellowbar parrotfish	

=== Fossil record ===
The fossil species, †Calotomus preisli Bellwood & Schultz, 1991 has been recovered from middle Miocene beds from Austria, suggesting the Paratethys Sea might have been tropical.
