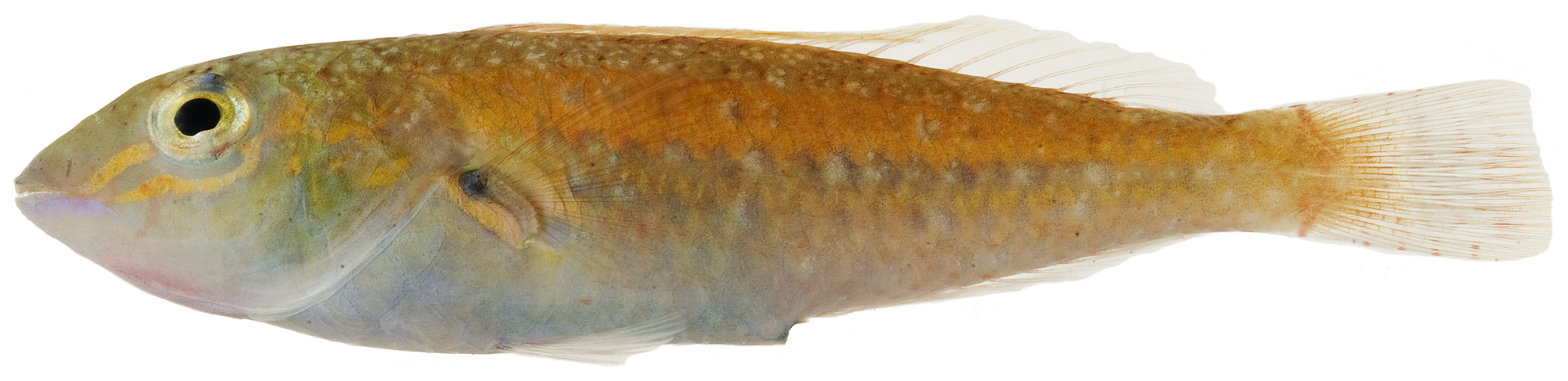

Conservation status
- Least Concern (IUCN 3.1)

Scientific classification
- Kingdom: Animalia
- Phylum: Chordata
- Class: Actinopterygii
- Order: Labriformes
- Family: Labridae
- Subfamily: Scarinae
- Tribe: Sparisomatini
- Genus: Cryptotomus; Cope, 1871
- Species: C. roseus

Binomial name
- Cryptotomus roseus Cope, 1871

= Bluelip parrotfish =

Species of ray-finned fish

Cryptotomus roseus, the bluelip parrotfish, is a species of marine ray-finned fish, a parrotfish, in the family Labridae. It is found in the warmer waters of the western Atlantic Ocean. The bluelip parrotfish typically inhabits seagrass beds. It is a protogynous hermaphrodite.
