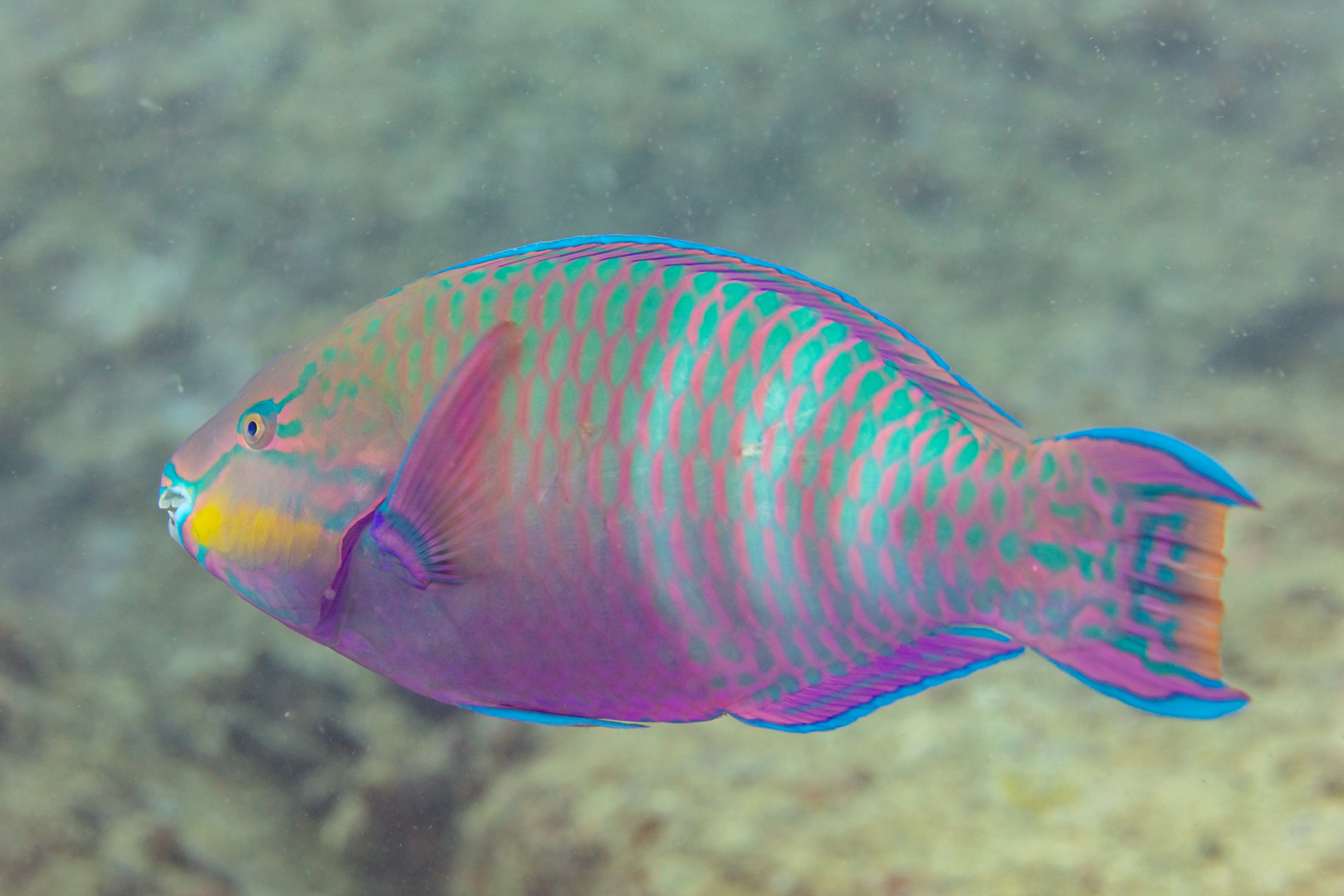
- Terminal phase

Conservation status
- Least Concern (IUCN 3.1)

Scientific classification
- Kingdom: Animalia
- Phylum: Chordata
- Class: Actinopterygii
- Order: Labriformes
- Family: Labridae
- Genus: Scarus
- Species: S. psittacus

Binomial name
- Scarus psittacus Forsskål, 1775

Synonyms
- List: Scarus venosus Valenciennes, 1840; Xanothon venosus (Valenciennes, 1840); Scarus hertit Valenciennes, 1840; Scarus forsteri Valenciennes, 1840; Callyodon forsteri (Valenciennes, 1840); Scarus taeniurus Valenciennes, 1840; Scarus balinensis Bleeker, 1849; Scarus bataviensis Bleeker, 1857; Callyodon bataviensis (Bleeker, 1857); Xanothon bataviensis (Bleeker, 1857); Pseudocarus oktodon Bleeker, 1861; Scarus oktodon (Bleeker, 1861); Xanothon oktodon (Bleeker, 1861); Pseudoscarus forskalii Klunzinger, 1871; Scarus forskalii (Klunzinger, 1871); Pseudoscarus filholi Sauvage, 1880; Pseudoscarus labiosus Macleay, 1883; Scarus gilberti Jenkins, 1901; Scarus brunneus Jenkins, 1901; Scarus jenkinsi Jordan & Evermann, 1903; Callyodon erythacus Jordan & Seale, 1906; Callyodon hornbosteli Fowler, 1925; Scarus galena Jordan, 1925; Xanothon carifanus J. L. B. Smith, 1956; Xanothon parvidens J. L. B. Smith, 1956

= Scarus psittacus =

Species of fish

Scarus psittacus, the common parrotfish, is a species of marine ray-finned fish, a parrotfish, in the family Scaridae. Other common names for this species include the palenose parrotfish, Batavian parrotfish and the rosy-cheek parrotfish. It has a wide distribution in the Indo-Pacific region where it is associated with coral reefs. This species is utilised as food. It is the type species of the genus Scarus.

== Taxonomy ==
Scarus psittacus was first formally described in 1775 by the Swedish explorer, orientalist and naturalist Peter Forsskål (1732-1763) with the type locality given as Jeddah. Subsequently Joseph Swain designated S. psittacus as the type species of the genus Scarus.

Research has found that across its wide distribution S. psittacus has five genetically distinct geographic populations with the most genetic diversity within populations and the most diverse populations being at the eastern and western ends of its range.

== Description ==
Scarus psittacus attains a standard length of 30 centimetres (12 in). The dorsal fin has 9 spines and 10 soft rays while the anal fin has 3 spines and 9 soft rays and the pectoral fin has 13–15 rays. The lips of this fish largely cover the dental plates. In the initial phase there is a canine-like tooth on upper dental plate, and in the terminal phase there are two canine-like teeth on the upper plate and a single such tooth on the lower plate. In the terminal phase the caudal fin is deeply emaginate. The initial phase individuals are uniformly red-brown with a number of pale blotches and an obvious pale head. In the terminal phase they are mostly pale green to tan in colour, with a lavender face and blue bands over their upper lip which extend rearwards over the cheek below the eye, with a second green band behind the eye and more bands on the lower lip and chin.

== Distribution ==
Scarus psittacus is widespread in the Indian and Pacific Oceans, its distribution extends from the Red Sea, Persian Gulf and Gulf of Aden to Sodwana Bay, it ranges eastwards across the Indian Ocean and into the Pacific Ocean extending eastwards to Hawaii, north to southern Japan and south to Australia, as far as Shark Bay in Western Australia and Lord Howe Island.

== Habitat and biology ==
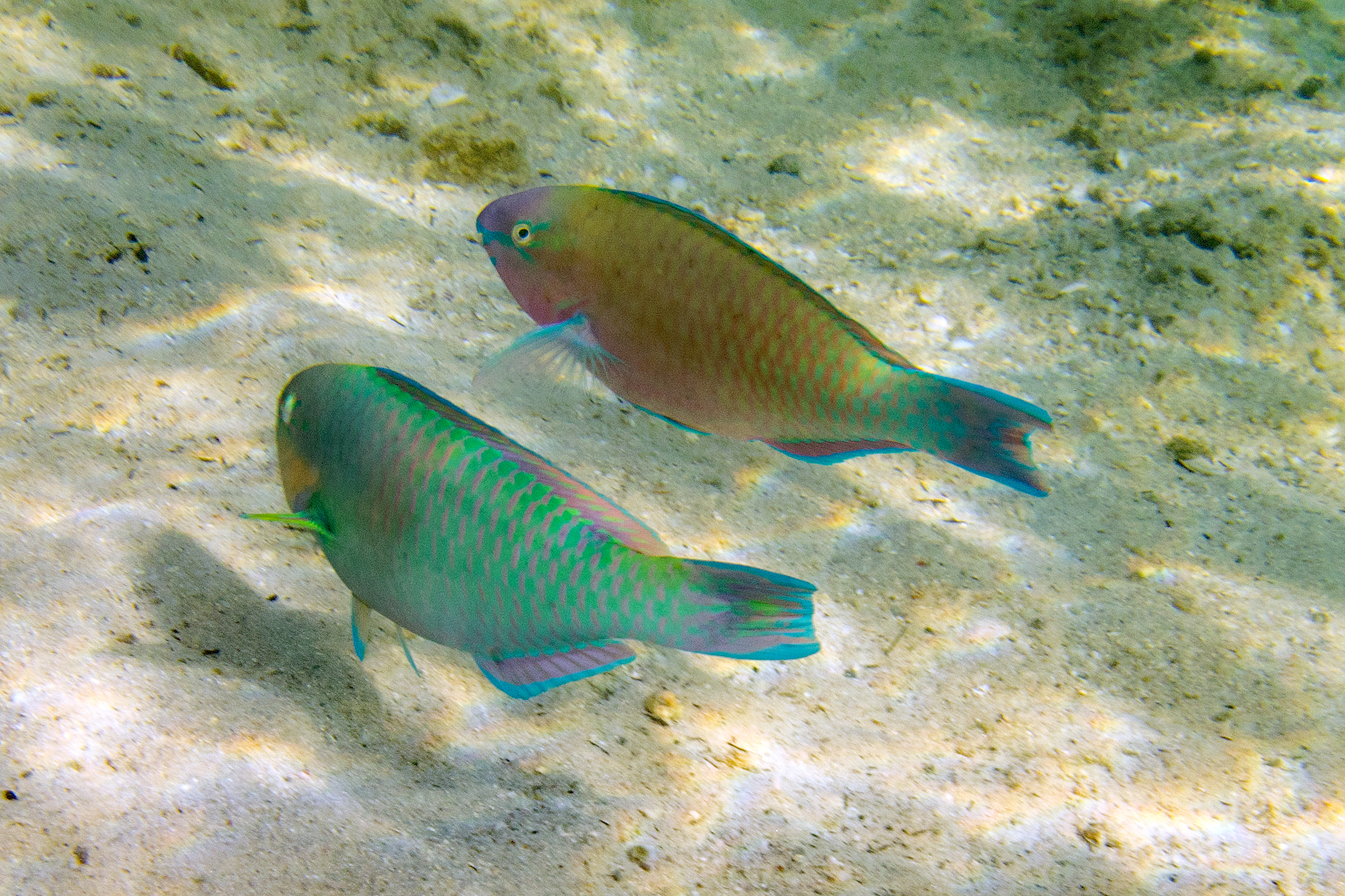
Compared to Scarus rivulatus (bottom). In Queensland.

Scarus psittacus is a common and typical species of reef fronts, as well as more sheltered areas of reefs and of lagoons. It occurs to a depth of 30 metres (98 ft). It can be encountered in small schools foraging over corals, reef flats in lagoons and on seaward reefs which have an abundant growth of the filamentous algae on which it feeds. Like most species of parrotfish S. psittacus is a protogynous hermaphrodite and is sexually dichromatic. The population is made up of a few large, colourful territorial males called terminal phase who guard groups, or harems, of smaller, less colourful individuals termed initial phase. Most of the initial phase individuals are females but around a quarter of the initial phase individuals caught off Oahu were males. These males are "sneaker males" which attend the mating of the terminal phase males with the females and attempt to inseminate some of the eggs laid. The terminal phase males usually start life as females and when there is no terminal male available the dominant female in the harem transforms into a male. The initial phase males are male throughout their life, and occasionally they can become terminal phase individuals.

== Human usage ==
Scarus psittacus is caught in some small scale fisheries but its flesh is regarded as poor as it is too soft.
