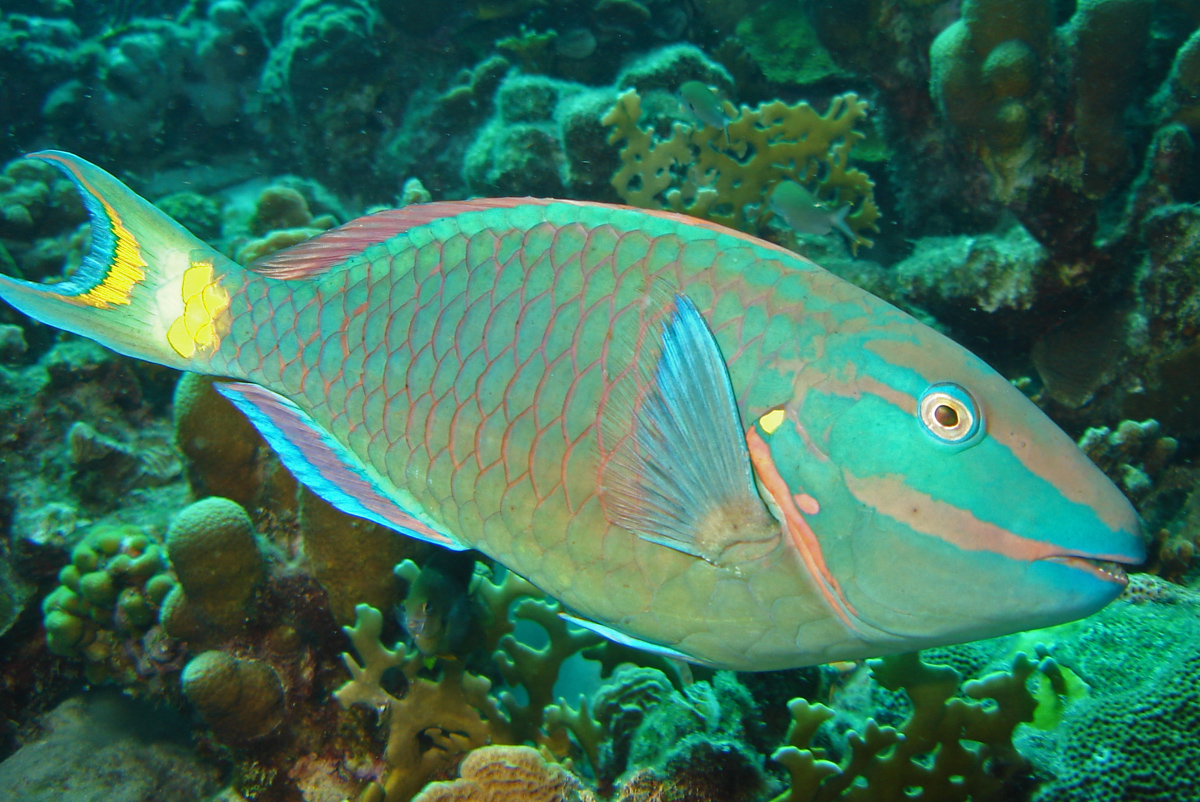
- Sparisoma viride

Scientific classification
- Kingdom: Animalia
- Phylum: Chordata
- Class: Actinopterygii
- Division: Teleostei
- Order: Labriformes
- Family: Labridae
- Subfamily: Scarinae; Rafinesque, 1810

Genera
- Bolbometopon; Calotomus; Cetoscarus; Chlorurus; Cryptotomus; Hipposcarus; Leptoscarus; Nicholsina; Scarus; Sparisoma

= Parrotfish =

Parrotfish Temporal range: Miocene–present

Clade of ray-finned fishes

Parrotfish (named because their mouths resemble a parrot's beak) are a clade of fish placed in the subfamily Scarinae of the wrasse family (Labridae). Historically considered as the family Scaridae, genetic studies found them to be deeply nested within the wrasses, and they are now treated as a subfamily. With roughly 95 species, the group's largest species richness is in the Indo-Pacific. They are herbivores or corallivores inhabiting coral reefs, rocky coasts, and seagrass beds, and can play a significant role in bioerosion as some species eat away at the corals. This activity often contributes to enriching the sand content on the surrounding ocean floor.

== Taxonomy ==
Traditionally, the parrotfishes have been considered to be a family level taxon, Scaridae. Although phylogenetic and evolutionary analyses of parrotfish are ongoing, they are now widely accepted to form a clade (a fundamental grouping in evolutionary biology consisting of a single common ancestor and all of its descendants) of wrasses closely related to the tribe Cheilini, and are now commonly referred to as "scarine labrids" (of the subfamily Scarinae/tribe Scarini, family Labridae).

Some authorities have preferred to maintain the parrotfishes as a family-level taxon, resulting in Labridae not being monophyletic (unless split into several families).

Some sources retain the Scaridae as a family, placing it alongside the wrasses of the family Labridae and the weed whitings Odacidae in the order Labriformes, part of the Percomorpha. They also do not support the division of the Scaridae into two subfamilies. However, such a placement is paraphyletic as they are consistently recovered close to the wrasse of the subfamily Cheilininae, so they are retained with the wrasses by Eschmeyer's Catalog of Fishes.

The following taxonomic treatment is based on that of Eschmeyer's Catalog of Fishes, with tribes based on Viviani et al. (2022):

Tribe	Genus	Species (#)	Image
Scarini	Bolbometopon Smith, 1956	1	
Scarini	Cetoscarus Smith, 1956	2	
Scarini	Chlorurus Swainson, 1839	18	
Scarini	Hipposcarus Smith, 1956	2	
Scarini	Scarus Forsskål, 1775	53	
Sparisomatini	Calotomus Gilbert, 1890	5	
Sparisomatini	Cryptotomus Cope, 1870	1	
Sparisomatini	Leptoscarus Swainson, 1839	1	
Sparisomatini	Nicholsina Fowler, 1915	3	
Sparisomatini	Sparisoma Swainson, 1839	15	

The two tribes are distinguished by their different feeding styles: sparisomatines feed on marine plants and macroalgae, while scarines feed on dead corals and rubble.

Fossil remains of parrotfishes are known, with Bolbometopon sp. from the Early Miocene of Java, Indonesia and Sri Lanka, Calotomus preisli from Miocene Austria, along with indeterminate and dubious species found from the Ypresian of the Eocene onwards.

== Description ==
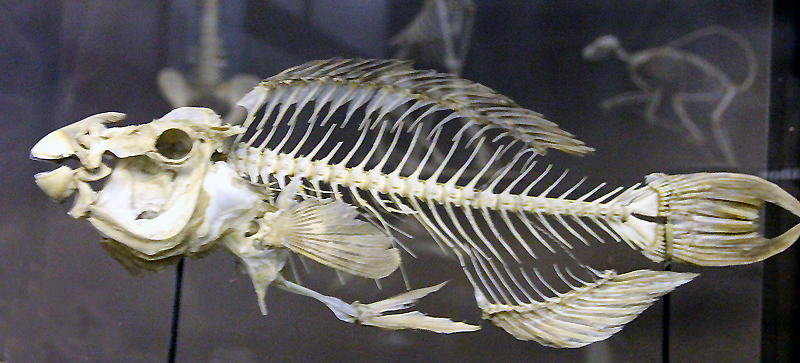
Parrotfish skeleton

Parrotfish are named for their dentition, which is distinct from other fish, including other labrids; their numerous teeth are arranged in a tightly packed mosaic on the external surface of their jaw bones, forming a parrot-like beak with which they rasp algae from coral and other rocky substrates (which contributes to the process of bioerosion).

Maximum sizes vary within the group, with the majority of species reaching 30–50 cm (12–20 in) in length. However, a few species reach lengths in excess of 1 m (3 ft 3 in), with the green humphead parrotfish can reach up to 1.3 m (4 ft 3 in) TL (though is commonly 0.7 m (2 ft 4 in) SL). The smallest species is the bluelip parrotfish (Cryptotomus roseus), which has a maximum size of 13 cm (5.1 in).

Parrotfish have 10 dorsal soft rays, 9 dorsal spines, 9 anal soft rays, and 3 anal spines.

=== Protective mucus ===
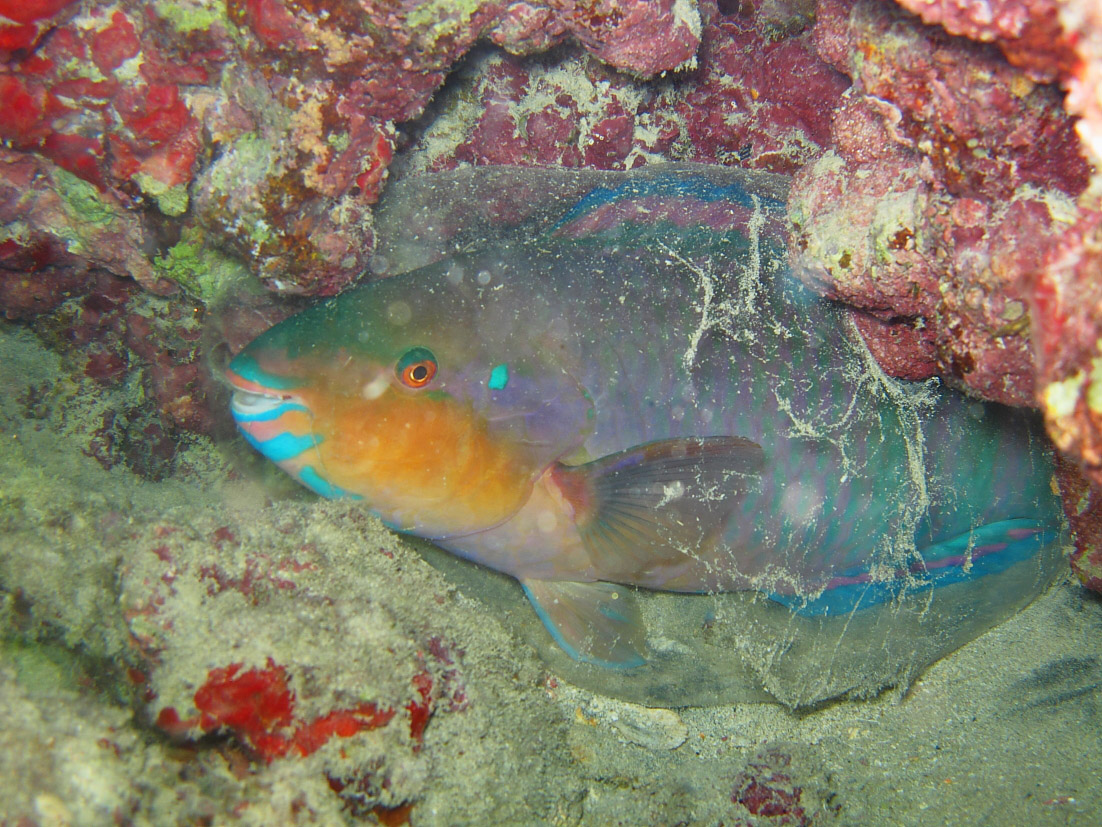
Scarus zelindae in its mucus cocoon

Some parrotfish species, such as the queen parrotfish (Scarus vetula), secrete a mucus cocoon, particularly at night; prior to resting, some species extrude mucus from their mouths, forming a protective cocoon that envelops the fish, presumably hiding its scent from potential predators. This mucus envelope may also act as an early warning system, allowing the parrotfish to flee when it detects predators such as moray eels disturbing the membrane.

The skin itself is covered in another mucous substance which may have antioxidant properties helpful in repairing bodily damage, or repelling parasites, in addition to providing protection from UV light.

== Biology ==
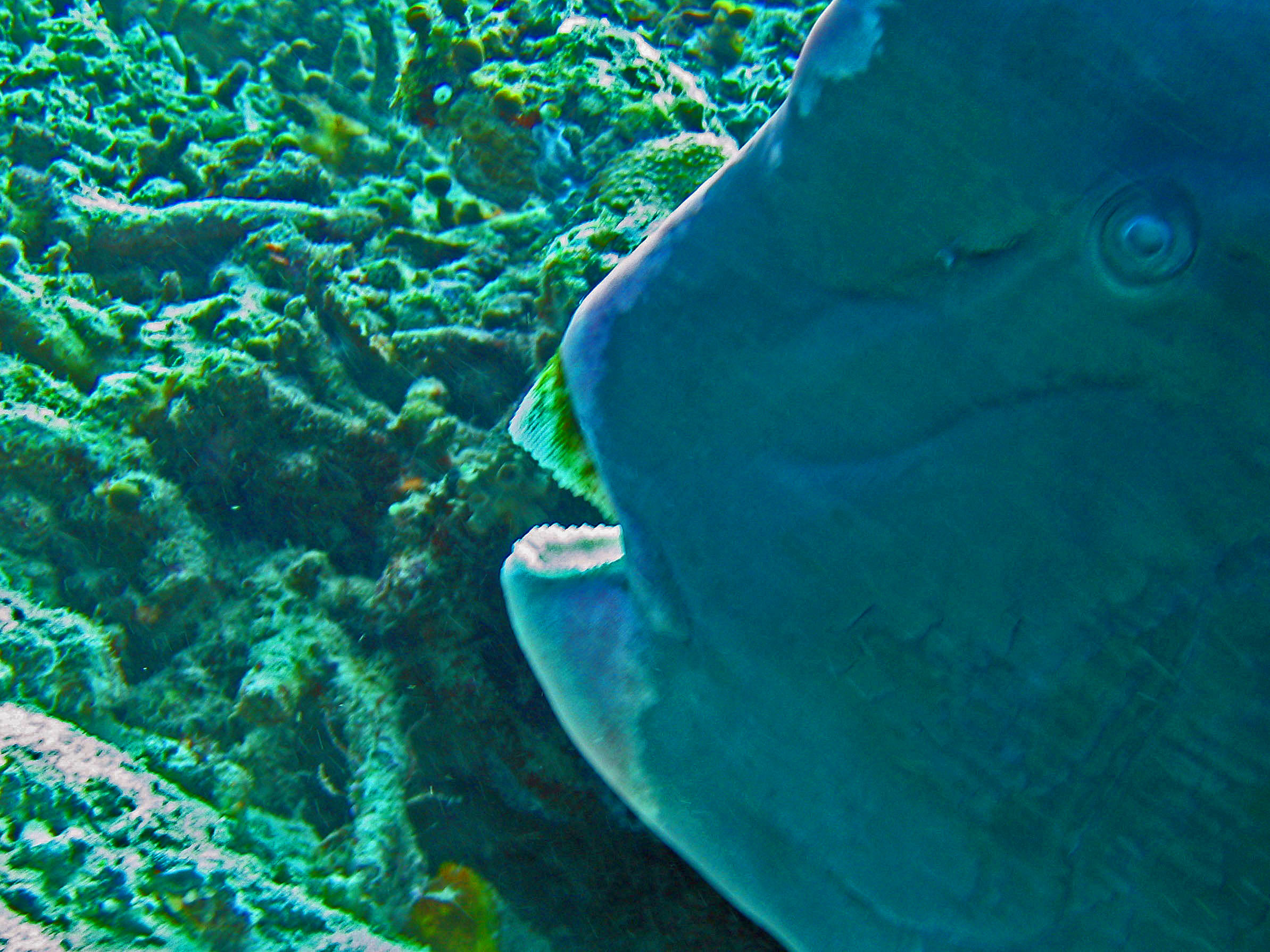
The strong beak of Bolbometopon muricatum is suited to 'excavating', grinding the sturdiest corals.

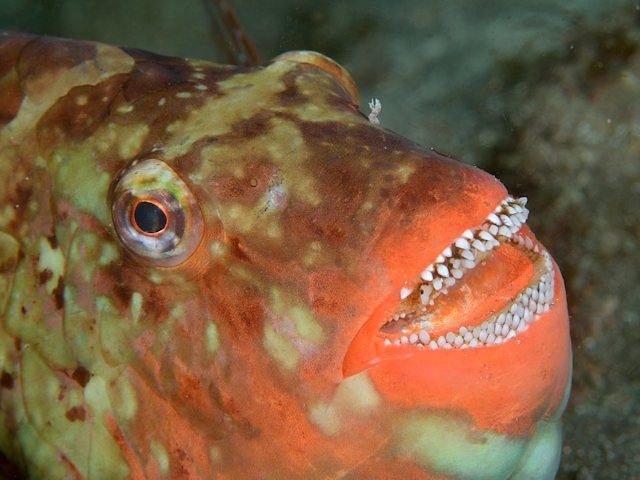
The beak of Calotomus japonicus is suited to 'browsing' on seagrass, macroalgae, and epilithic algae without touching the rocky substrate.

Most parrotfish species are herbivores, feeding mainly on epilithic algae. A wide range of other small organisms are sometimes eaten, including invertebrates (sessile and benthic species, as well as zooplankton), bacteria and detritus. A few mostly larger species such as the green humphead parrotfish (Bolbometopon muricatum) feed extensively on living coral (polyps). None of these are exclusive corallivores, but polyps can make up as much as half their diet or even more in the green humphead parrotfish. Overall it has been estimated that fewer than one percent of parrotfish bites involve live corals and all except the green humphead parrotfish prefer algae-covered surfaces over live corals. Nevertheless, when they do eat coral polyps, localized coral death can occur. Their feeding activity is important for the production and distribution of coral sands in the reef biome, and can prevent algal overgrowth of the reef structure. The teeth grow continuously, replacing material worn away by feeding. Whether they feed on coral, rock or seagrasses, the substrate is ground up between the pharyngeal teeth. After they digest the edible portions from the rock, they excrete it as sand, helping create small islands and the sandy beaches. The humphead parrotfish can produce 90 kg (200 lb) of sand each year. Or, on average (as there are so many variables i.e. size/species/location/depth etc.), almost 250 g (9 oz) per parrotfish per day. On Caribbean coral reefs, parrotfish are important consumers of sponges. An indirect effect of parrotfish grazing on sponges is the protection of reef-building corals that would otherwise be overgrown by fast-growing sponge species.

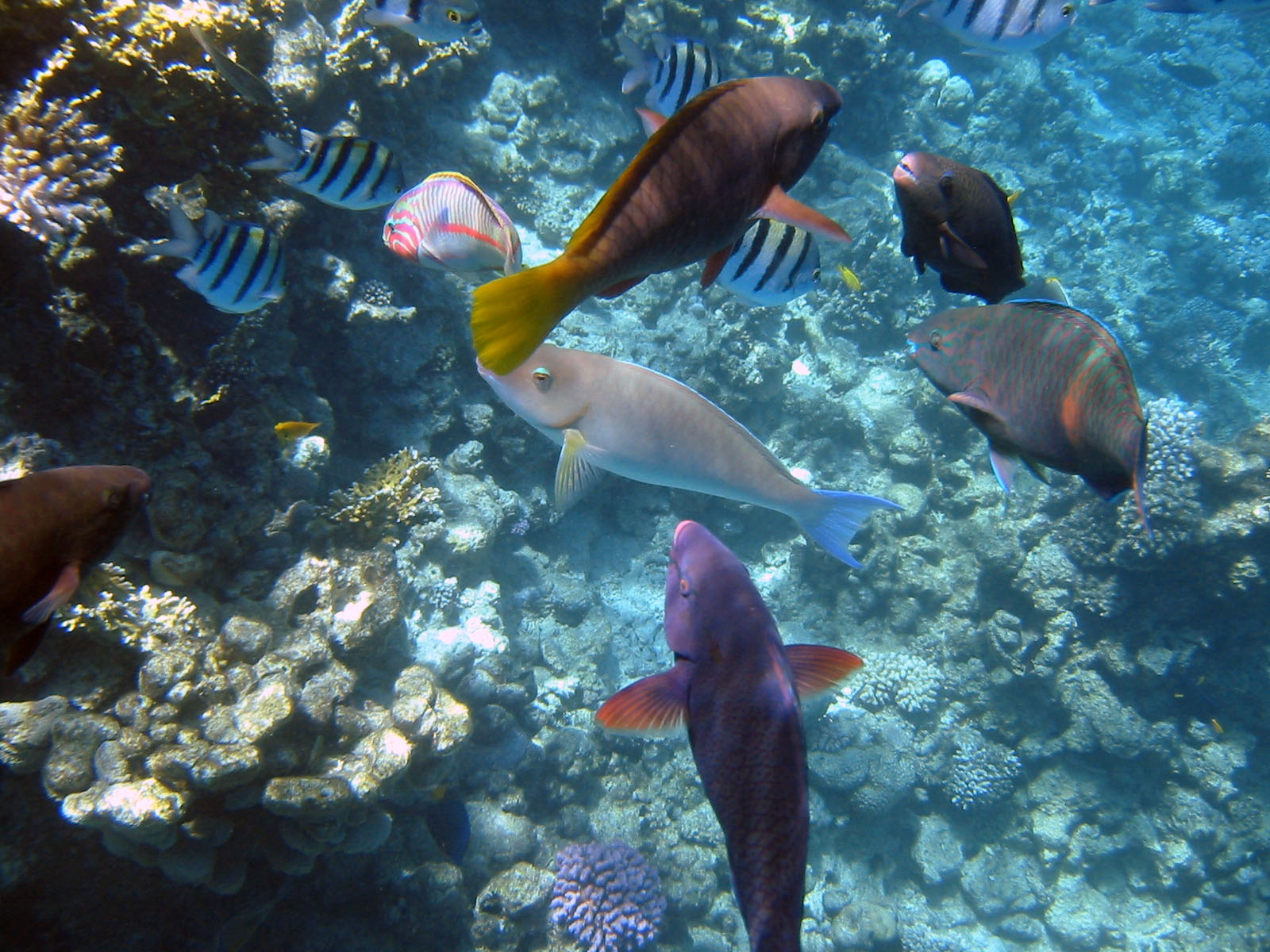
5 species of sympatric parrotfish across 3 genera, in the Red Sea

Analysis of parrotfish feeding biology describes three functional groups: excavators, scrapers and browsers. Excavators have larger, stronger jaws that can gouge the substrate, leaving visible scars on the surface. Scrapers have less powerful jaws that can but infrequently do leave visible scraping scars on the substrate. Some of these may also feed on sand instead of hard surfaces. Browsers mainly feed on seagrasses and their epiphytes. Mature excavating species include Bolbometopon muricatum, Cetoscarus, Chlorurus and Sparisoma viride. These excavating species all feed as scrapers in early juvenile stages, but Hipposcarus and Scarus, which also feed as scrapers in early juvenile stages, retain the scraping feeding mode as adults. Browsing species are found in the genera Calotomus, Cryptotomus, Leptoscarus, Nicholsina and Sparisoma. Feeding modes reflect habitat preferences, with browsers chiefly living in the grassy seabed, and excavators and scrapers on coral reefs.

Recently, the microphage feeding hypothesis challenged the prevailing paradigm of parrotfish as algal consumers by proposing that:

Most parrotfishes are microphages that target cyanobacteria and other protein-rich autotrophic microorganisms that live on (epilithic) or within (endolithic) calcareous substrata, are epiphytic on algae or seagrasses, or endosymbiotic within sessile invertebrates.

Microscopy and molecular barcoding of coral reef substrate bitten by scraping and excavating parrotfish suggest that coral reef cyanobacteria from the order Nostocales are important in the feeding of these parrotfish. Additional microscopy and molecular barcoding research indicates that some parrotfish may ingest microscopic biota associated with endolithic sponges.

Herbivorous marine fish use gut microbes in the intestines to digest carbohydrates. In aerobic conditions, bacteria ferments the carbohydrates and produces short-chain fatty acids or SCFAs. First studied in vertebrate herbivores, SCFAs also allow marine herbivores to further digest carbohydrates that were not broken down by digestive enzymes. This process may contribute as much as 30% of the basal metabolic energy needed for the organism. In herbivorous marine fish, acetate is the major SCFA found in the plasma. High SCFA concentration in the intestines is indicative of the use microbial digestion. Parrotfish have lower SCFA concentration than most other herbivorous marine fish; they mechanically process food as well, such that they may have less of a reliance on microbial digestion.

=== Life cycle ===
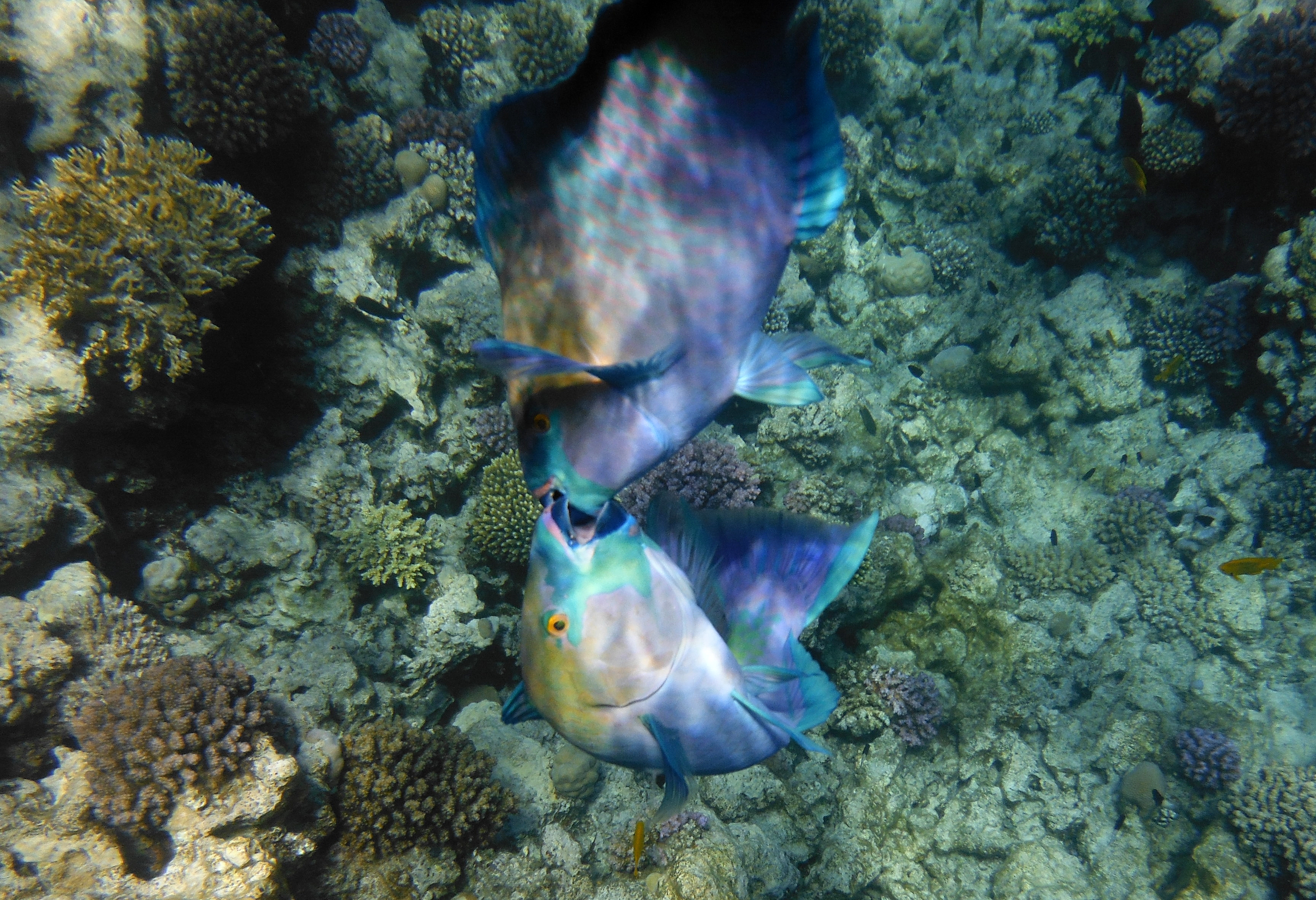
Terminal phase rusty parrotfish (Scarus ferrugineus) fighting

Most tropical species form large schools when feeding and these are often grouped by size. Harems are typical of most species, with the males vigorously defending their group of females and position from any challenge. As pelagic spawners, parrotfish release many tiny, buoyant eggs into the water, which become part of the plankton. The eggs float freely, settling into the coral until hatching.

==== Sex change ====
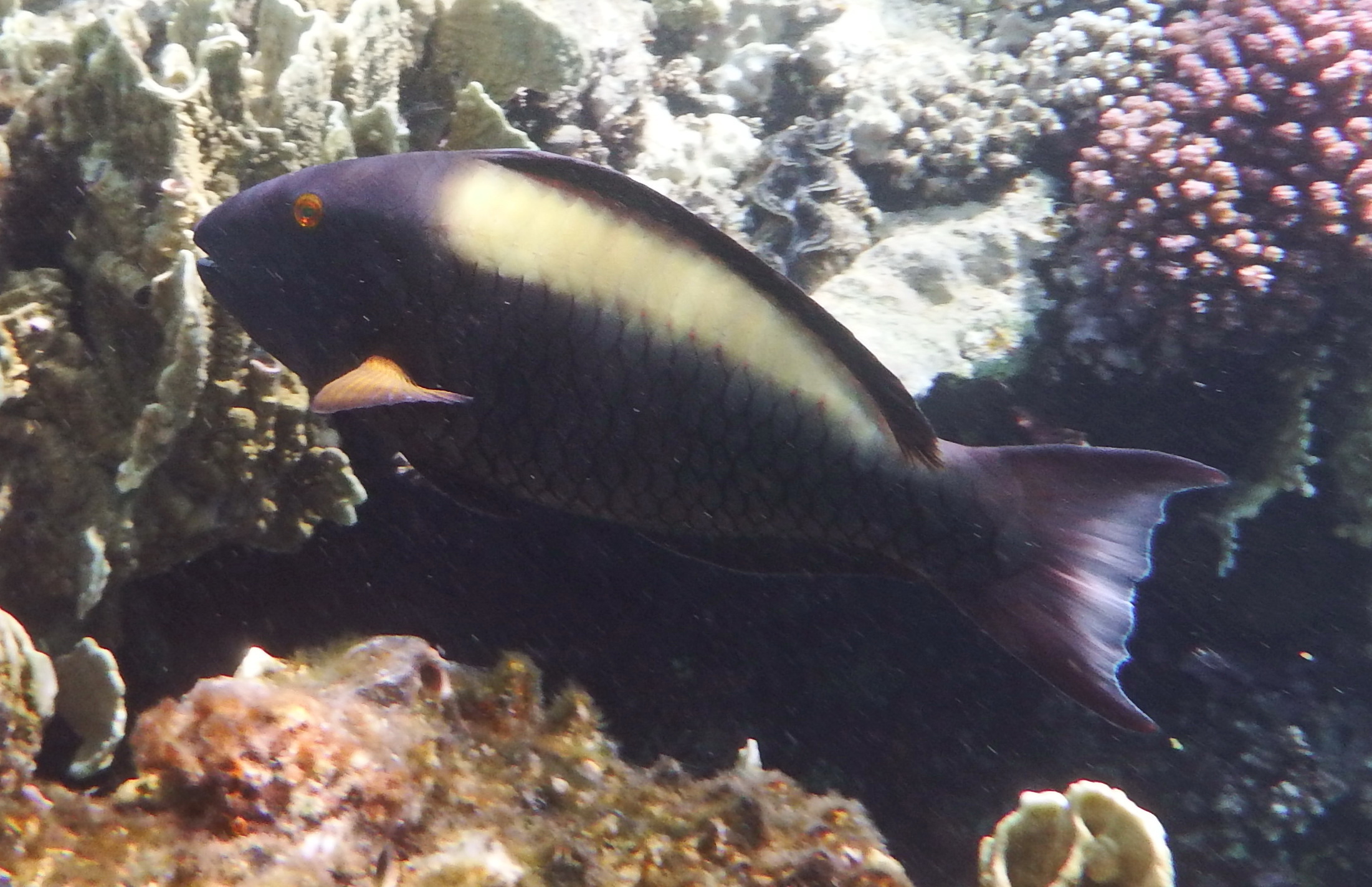
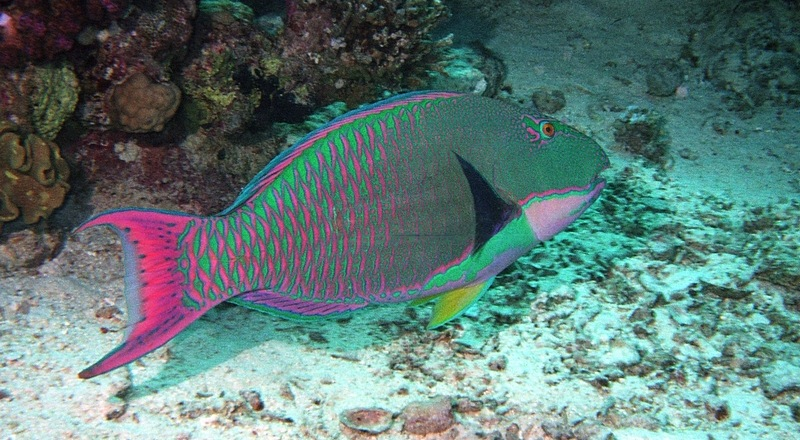
The bicolor parrotfish (Cetoscarus bicolor) was described by Eduard Rüppell in 1829. In 1835, he mistakenly described the terminal phase (right) as a separate species, C. pulchellus

The development of parrotfishes is complex and accompanied by a series of changes in sex and colour (polychromatism), with most species being sequential hermaphrodites, starting as females (known as the initial phase) and then changing to males (the terminal phase). In many species, for example the stoplight parrotfish (Sparisoma viride), a number of individuals develop directly to males (i.e., they do not start as females). These directly developing males usually most resemble the initial phase, and often display a different mating strategy than the terminal phase males of the same species. A few species such as the Mediterranean parrotfish (S. cretense) are secondary gonochorists. This means that some females do not change sex (they remain females throughout their lives), the ones that do change from female to male do it while still immature (reproductively functioning females do not change to males) and there are no males with female-like colors (the initial phase males in other parrotfish). The marbled parrotfish (Leptoscarus vaigiensis) is the only species of parrotfish known not to change sex. In most species, the initial phase is dull red, brown, or grey, while the terminal phase is vividly green or blue with bright pink, orange or yellow patches. In a smaller number of species the phases are similar, and in the Mediterranean parrotfish the adult female is brightly colored, while the adult male is gray. In most species, juveniles have a different color pattern from adults. Juveniles of some tropical species can alter their color temporarily to mimic other species. Where the sexes and ages differ, the remarkably different phases often were first described as separate species. As a consequence early scientists recognized more than 350 parrotfish species, which is almost four times the actual number.

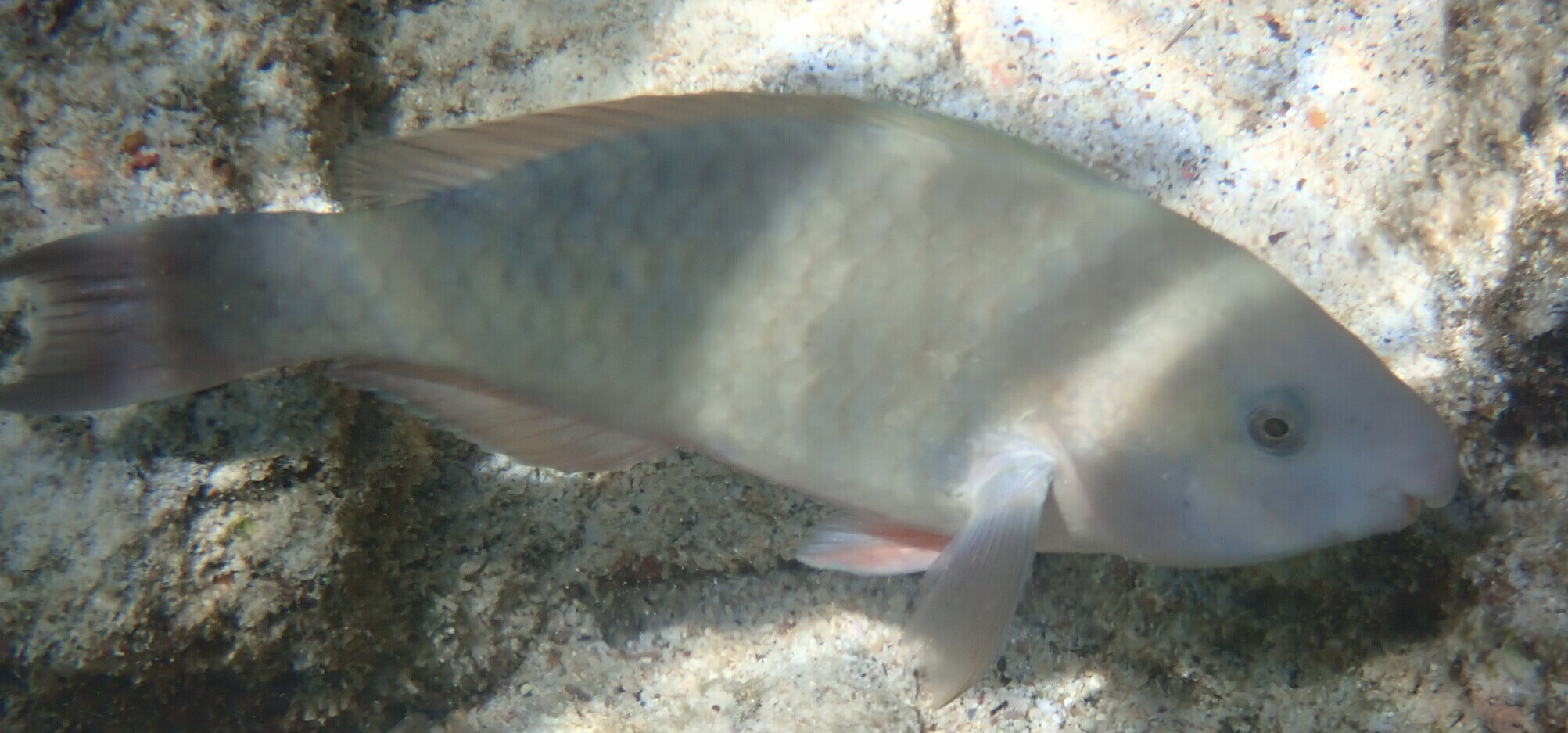
Female Scarus psittacus (= initial phase)

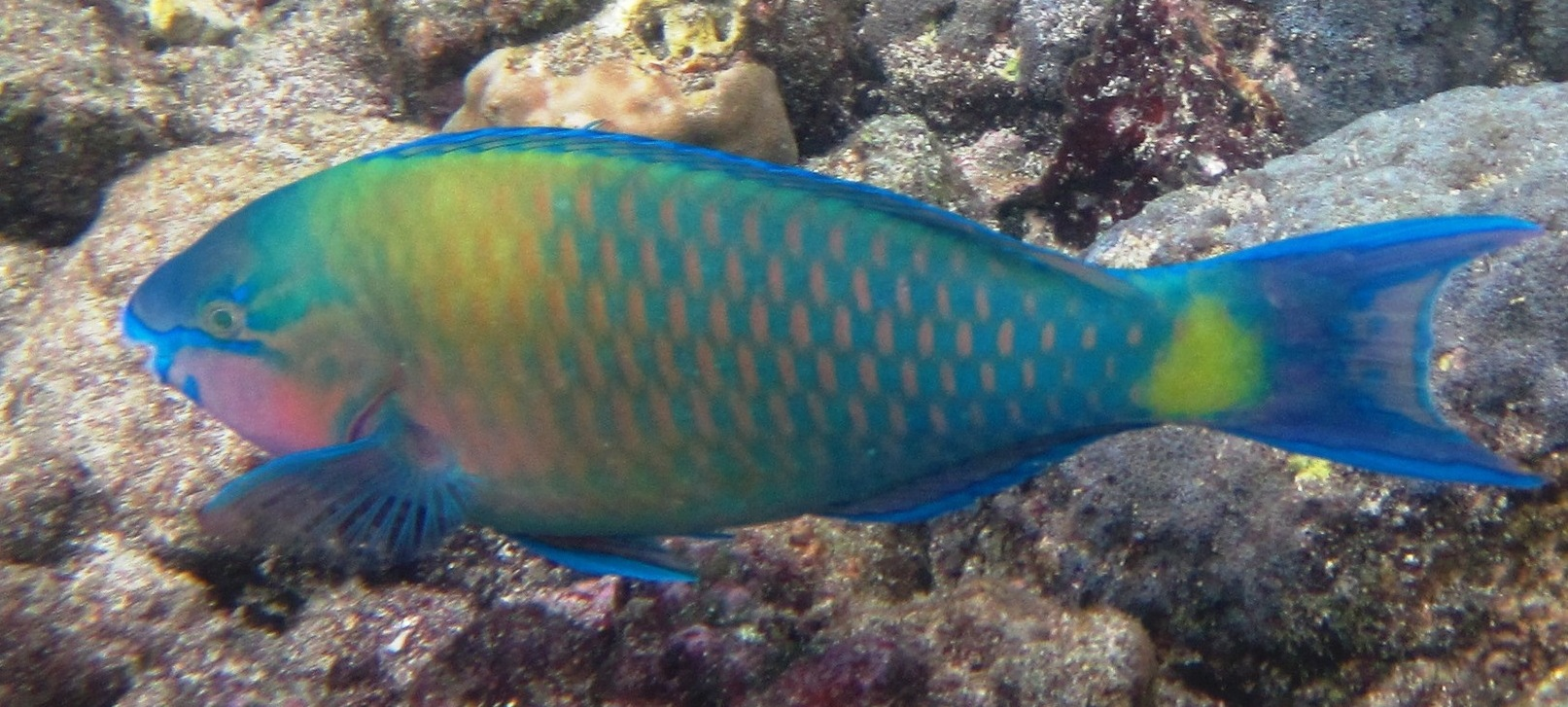
Male Scarus psittacus (= terminal phase)

The sex change in parrotfishes is accompanied by changes in circulating steroids. Females have high levels of estradiol, moderate levels of T and undetectable levels of the major fish androgen 11-Ketotestosterone. During the transition from initial to terminal coloration phases, concentrations of 11-Ketotestosterone rise dramatically and estrogen levels decline. If a female is injected with 11-ketotestosterone, it will cause a precocious change in gonadal, gametic and behavioural sex.

== Relation to humans ==
Grilled parrotfish, in Indonesia

A commercial fishery exists for some of the larger species, particularly in the Indo-Pacific, but also for a few others like the Mediterranean parrotfish. Most parrotfish species are not heavily fished, and thus their population dynamics are more likely determined by habitat and recruitment. However, large bodied and long-lived parrotfish species are highly vulnerable to over-exploitation by fisheries.

Despite their striking colors, their feeding behavior renders them highly unsuitable for most marine aquaria.

Parrotfish are important in maintaining ecosystem balance; their protection has been proposed as a way of saving Caribbean coral reefs from being overgrown with seaweed and sponges. Parrotfish on the Great Barrier Reef have an outsized role in maintaining its health; they are the only group among the thousands of native fish species that regularly performs the task of scraping and cleaning inshore coral reefs.

Grazing from marine herbivores such as parrotfish is important for ecosystems. When grazing decreases, the ecosystem becomes unstable, with acute changes in ecosystem processes, such as proliferation of epilithic algal turfs or massive increases in benthic sediment load. Grazing decreases during and after severe climactic disturbances, an example of which occurred from 2011 to 2012 on the Great Barrier Reef's Orpheus Island.
