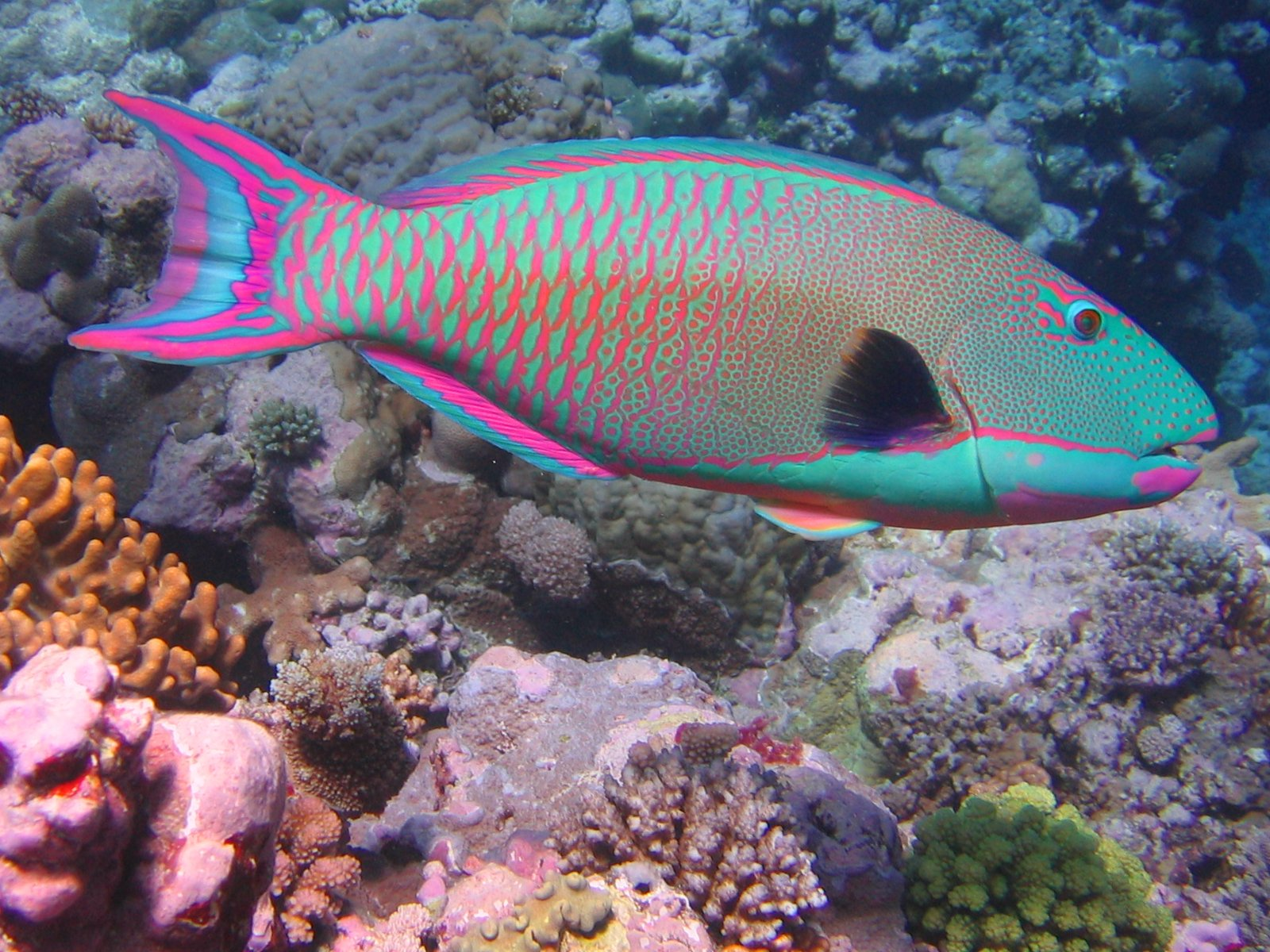
- Terminal phase, in Australia

Conservation status
- Least Concern (IUCN 3.1)

Scientific classification
- Kingdom: Animalia
- Phylum: Chordata
- Class: Actinopterygii
- Division: Teleostei
- Order: Labriformes
- Family: Labridae
- Genus: Cetoscarus
- Species: C. ocellatus

Binomial name
- Cetoscarus ocellatus (Valenciennes, 1840)

Synonyms
- Scarus ocellatus Valenciennes, 1840

= Cetoscarus ocellatus =

Species of fish

Cetoscarus ocellatus, commonly known as the spotted parrotfish, is a species of parrotfish belonging to the family Scaridae.

== Taxonomy ==
C. ocellatus was originally described as Scarus ocellatus in 1839, based on fish from the Caroline Islands in the western Pacific Ocean.

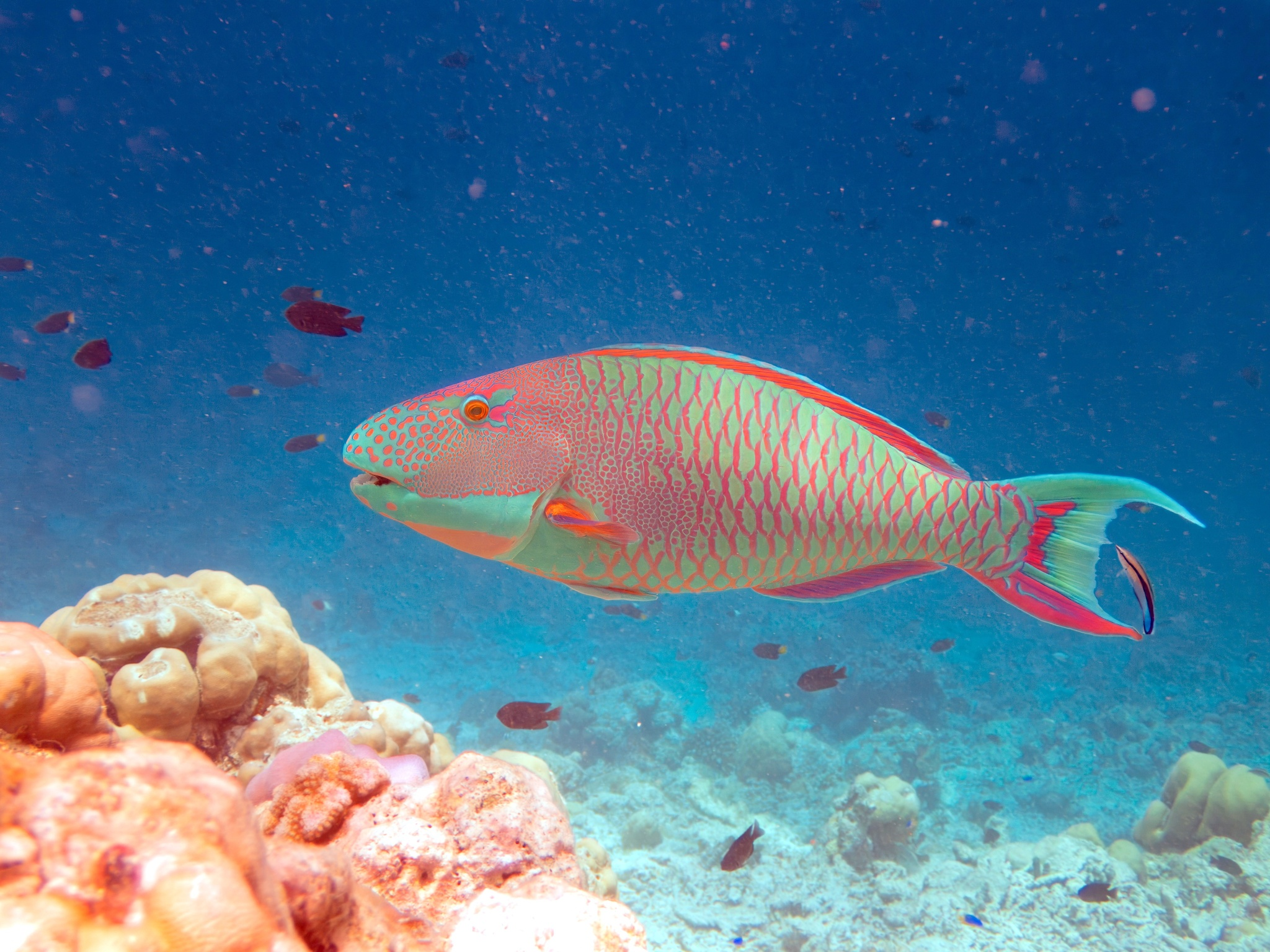
Terminal phase of "C. nigropinnis", in the Maldives

This species was formerly considered to be the same species as Cetoscarus bicolor, which is otherwise restricted to the Red Sea; however, due to major morphological and molecular differences between the two species, the IUCN Red List has recognized them as separate species since 2010. This species is sometimes known as the bicolour parrotfish, but this name also is applied to C. bicolor. C. ocellatus currently encompasses the Pacific and Indian Ocean populations and these are presently considered to be conspecific. However, molecular studies indicate that the Indian Ocean population is probably specifically distinct from the Pacific population, if this is the case, then the Indian Ocean species would be Cetoscarus nigropinnis.

== Etymology ==
The species name ocellatus refers to the dark ocellus on the dorsal fin of juveniles.

== Distribution ==
C. ocellatus is widespread in the coastal waters of Indian and Pacific Oceans. These fishes are found along the southern east coast of Africa (from Somalia to South Africa), Australia, Southeast Asia (Coral Triangle region) and from northern to southern Japan.

== Habitat ==
These fishes ares associated with coral reefs, and can be found at depths between 1 and 40 m (3.3 and 131.2 ft). They vary in habitat. Some prefer coral reefs, while some prefer seagrass beds, algal beds, mangroves and rocky reefs.

== Description ==
C. ocellatus can reach a body length of about 30–80 cm (12–31 in) when fully mature. This species has a long snout and shows 14-15 pectoral rays, 5-7 median predorsal scales and 3 rows of scales on cheek. The color of the C. ocellatus varies between genders as well as between adults and juveniles.

Juveniles are usually white with a thick orange band that surrounds the head, except snout and chin. They have a black circular spot on their dorsal fin and a thick orange band on their rounded tail.

Females of the initial phase have a dark purple to reddish brown head, finely spotted with black ventrally. Body shows dorsally a broad, pale yellowish zone while below it is bluish gray. Scales are rimmed and spotted with black. Median fins are brownish red and caudal with a whitish crescent posteriorly.

The brightly-coloured terminal males are green, scales are rimmed with pink, head and anterior body show numerous small pink spots. An orange line runs from mouth to anal fin.

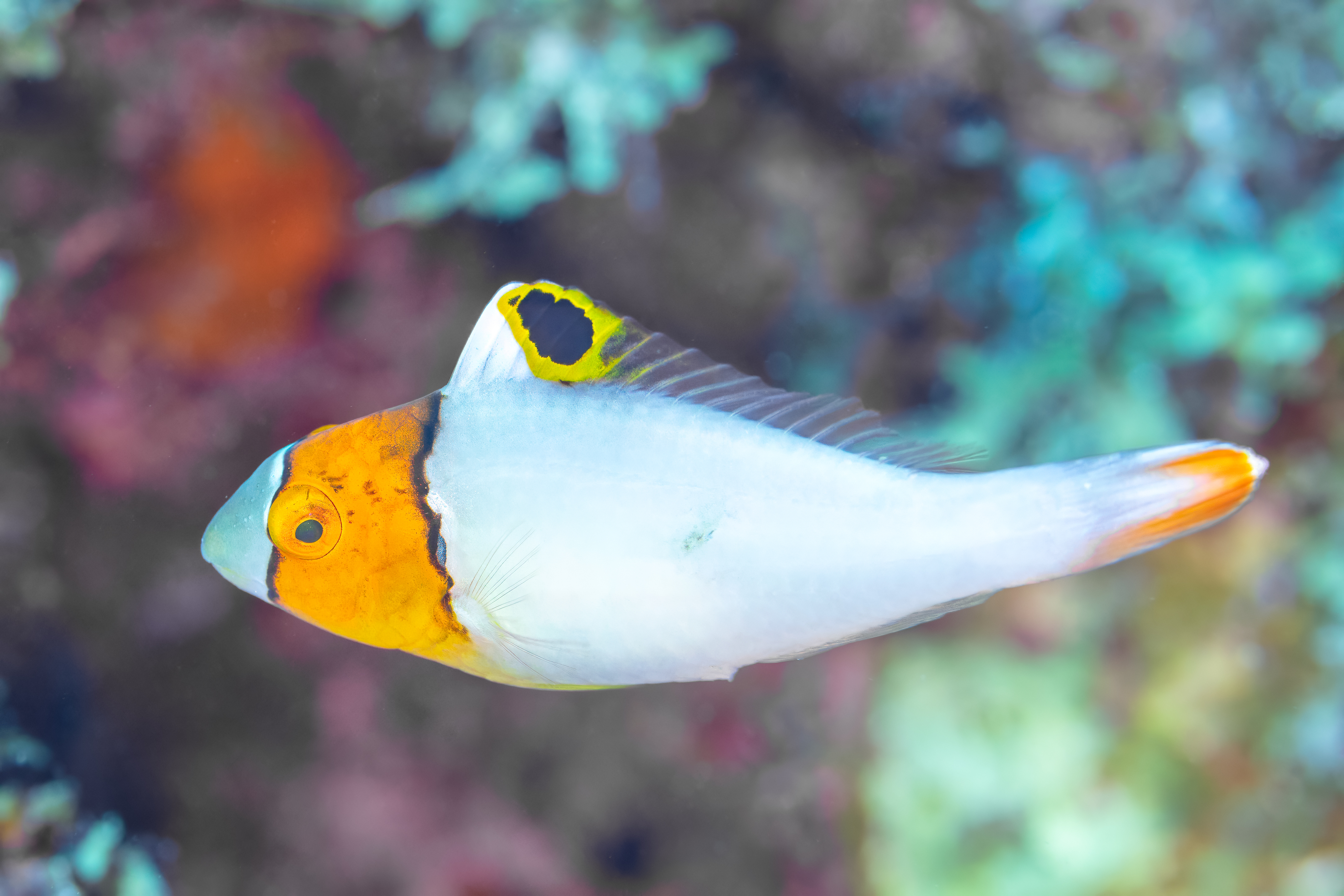
Juvenile, in Madagascar

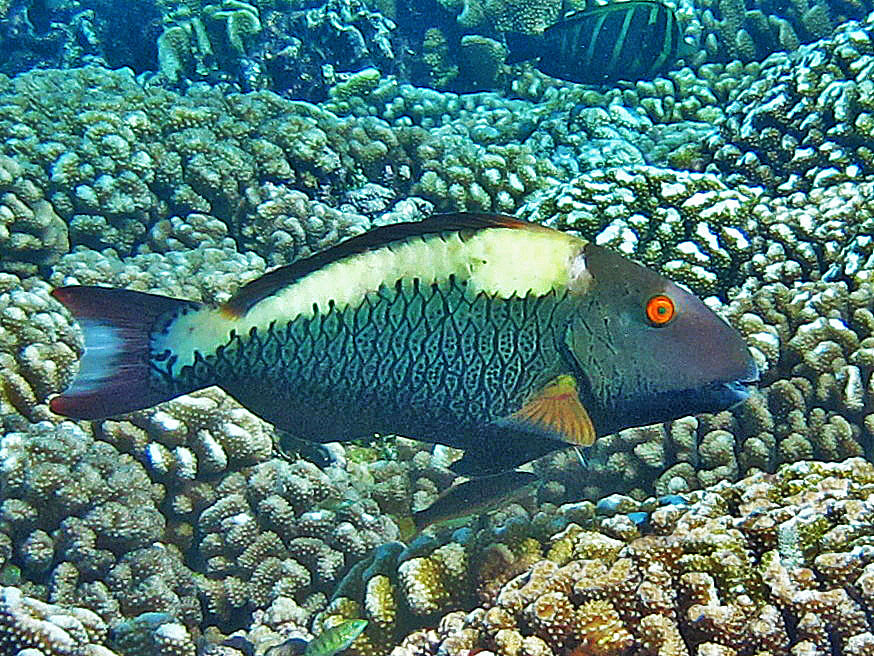
Initial phase, in French Polynesia

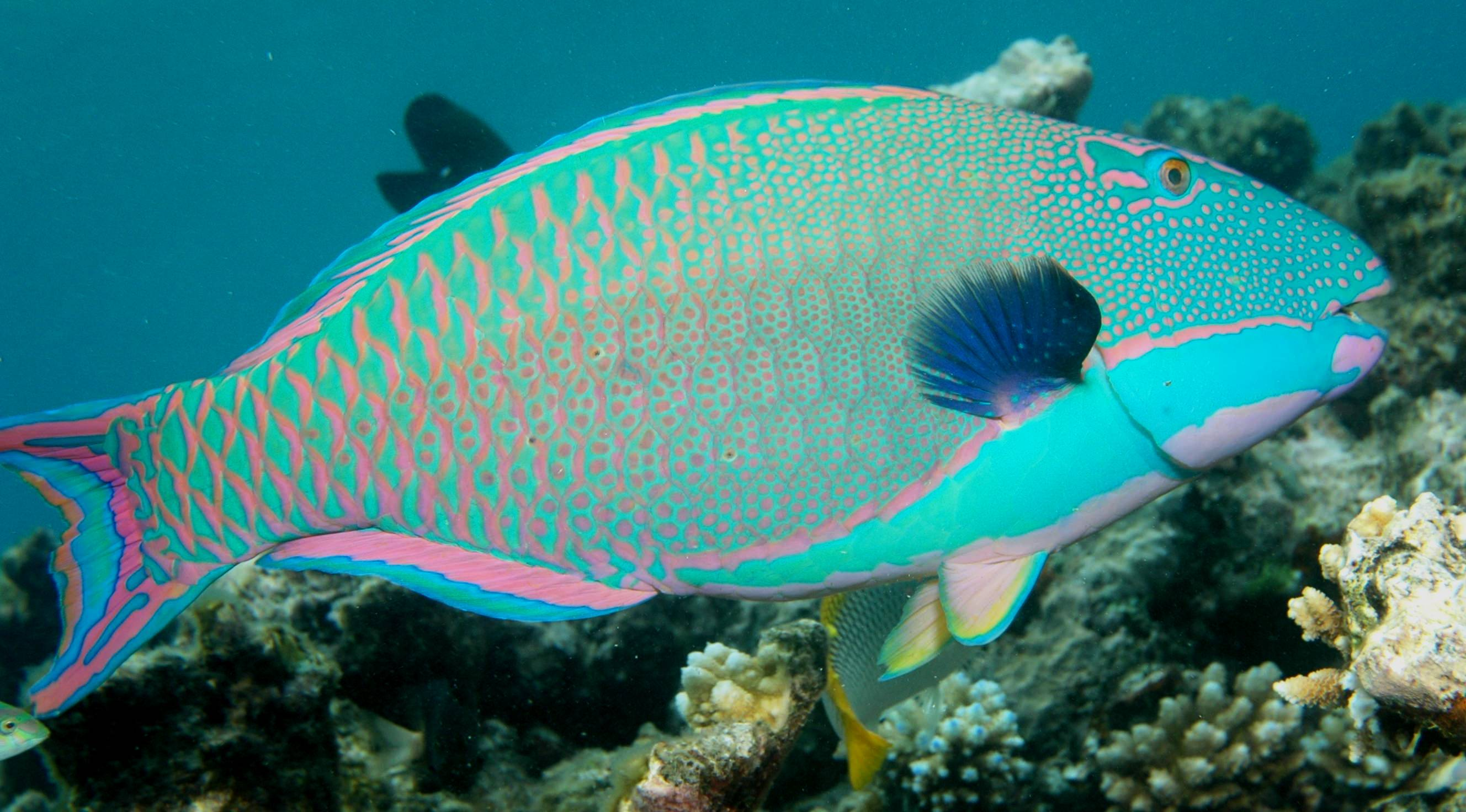
Terminal phase, at Great Barrier Reef Marine Park, Australia

== Biology ==
C. ocellatus is a hermaphroditic member of the Parrotfish family. It is found largely within the Coral Triangle region, although it has been found to inhabit sea grass, algal beds as well as mangroves. As these Parrot Fishes are hermaphrodites, they start out as females (the 'initial phase') and eventually can become males. They travel in large schools that are led by one dominant male followed by females. If for some reason this male were to leave or get separated, one of the dominant females of the group will take charge and change its gender and color.

C. ocellatus like all other parrot fish are corallivoes (feeding on coral). An experiment by Bellwood and Choat in 1990 showed that C. ocellatus take 10% fewer bites of live coral in the Great Barrier reef compared to other parrot fishes.

== Threats ==
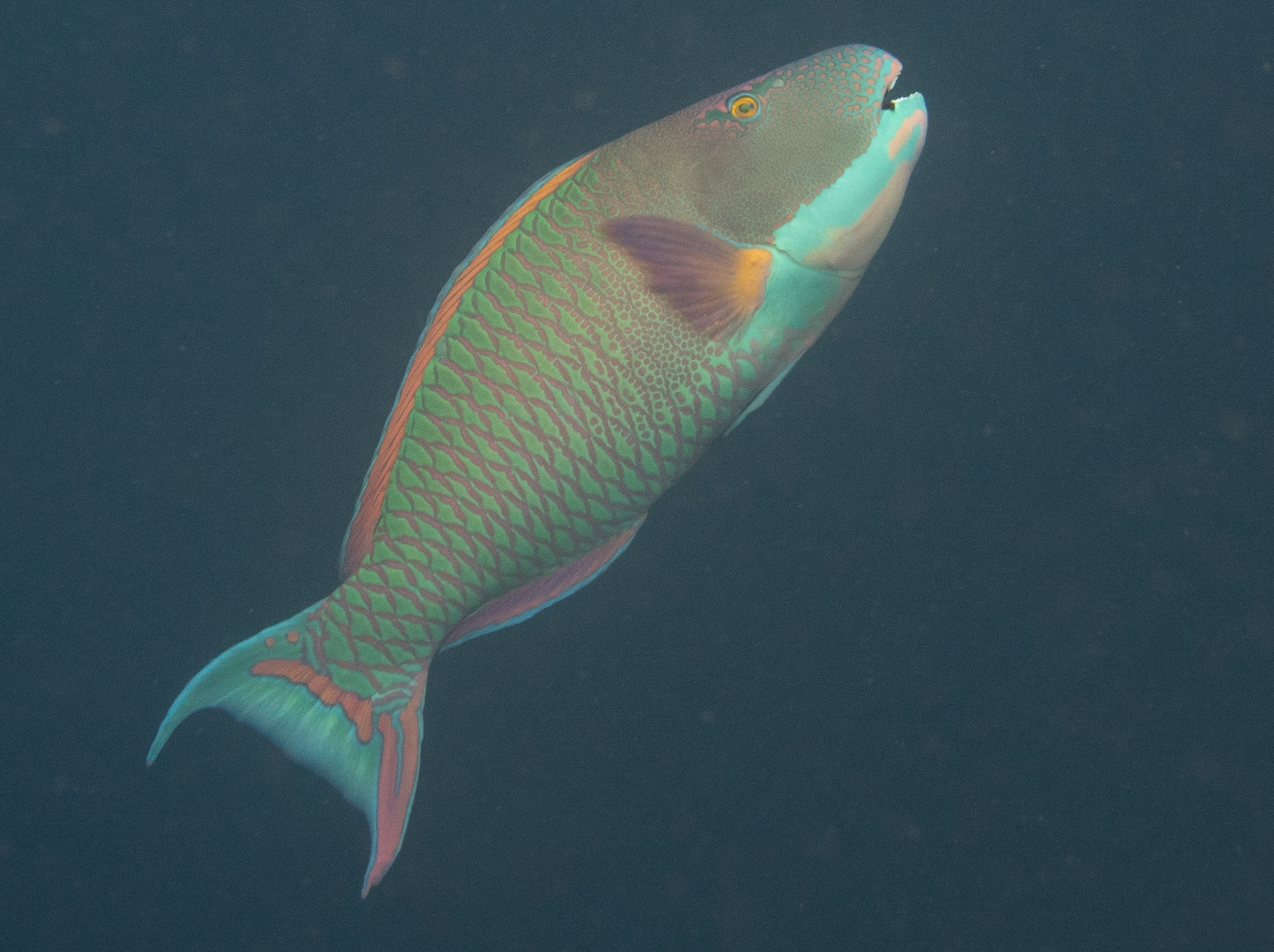
Terminal phase, in the Maldives

In the Coral Triangle Region fish are being threatened by overfishing, destruction of habitat and destructive fishing practices. Due to climate change, their habitats are being destroyed. This is detrimental due to the fact that parrot fish are important to the dynamic of coral reefs.

The family of parrot fish has about 80 different species. In 2009, a study was conducted on genetic diversity among different species of parrot fish. The study found that that C. ocellatus had one of the lowest values of genetic diversity, making it highly vulnerable to drastic changes in its environment due to climate change and habitat destruction. Thus, C. ocellatus is less likely to adapt when compared to other parrotfish.

While most parrotfish species are relatively lightly fished, this large species is favoured by fishermen in some areas of the world which further contributes to their decline.
