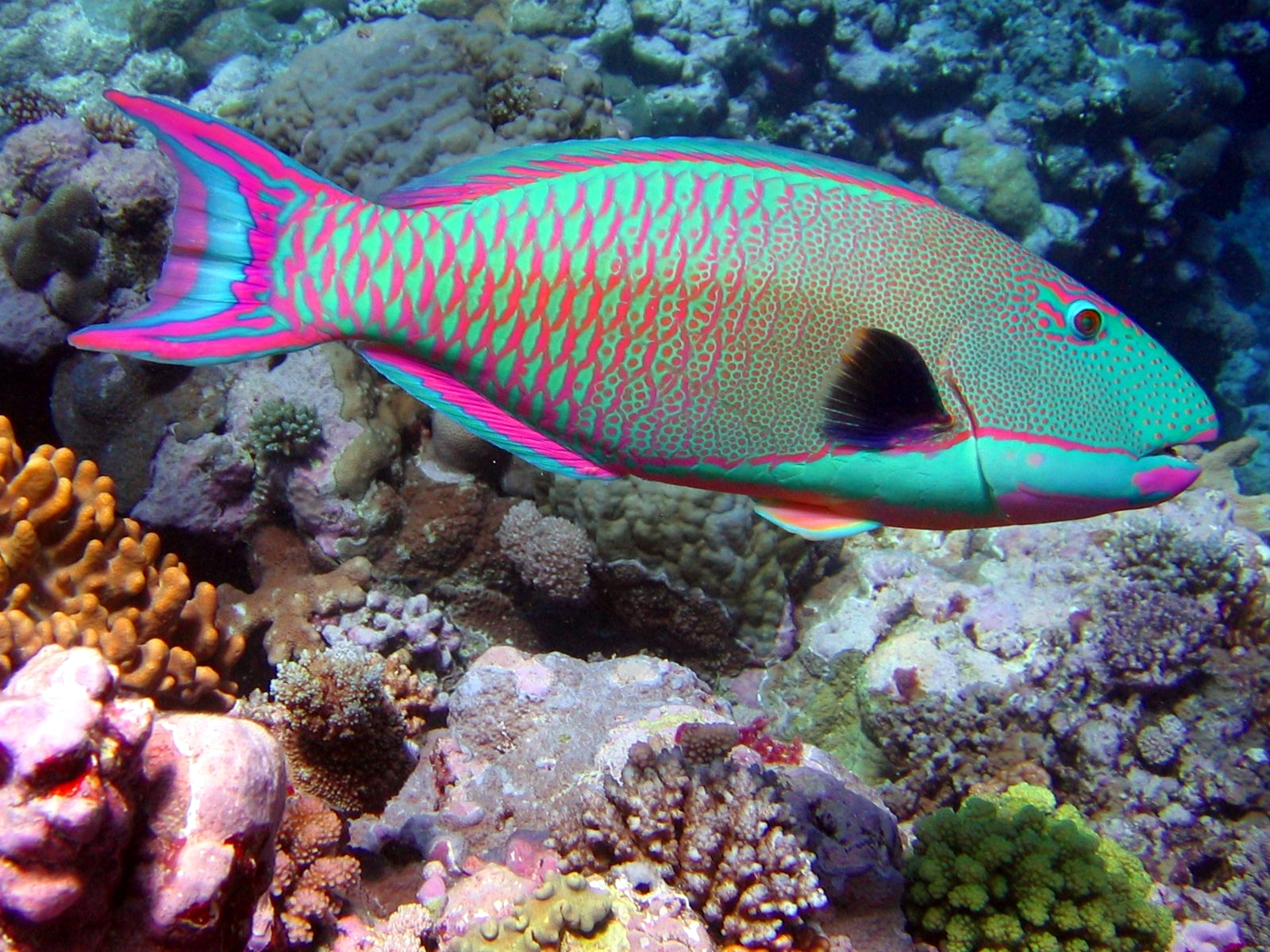
- Cetoscarus ocellatus
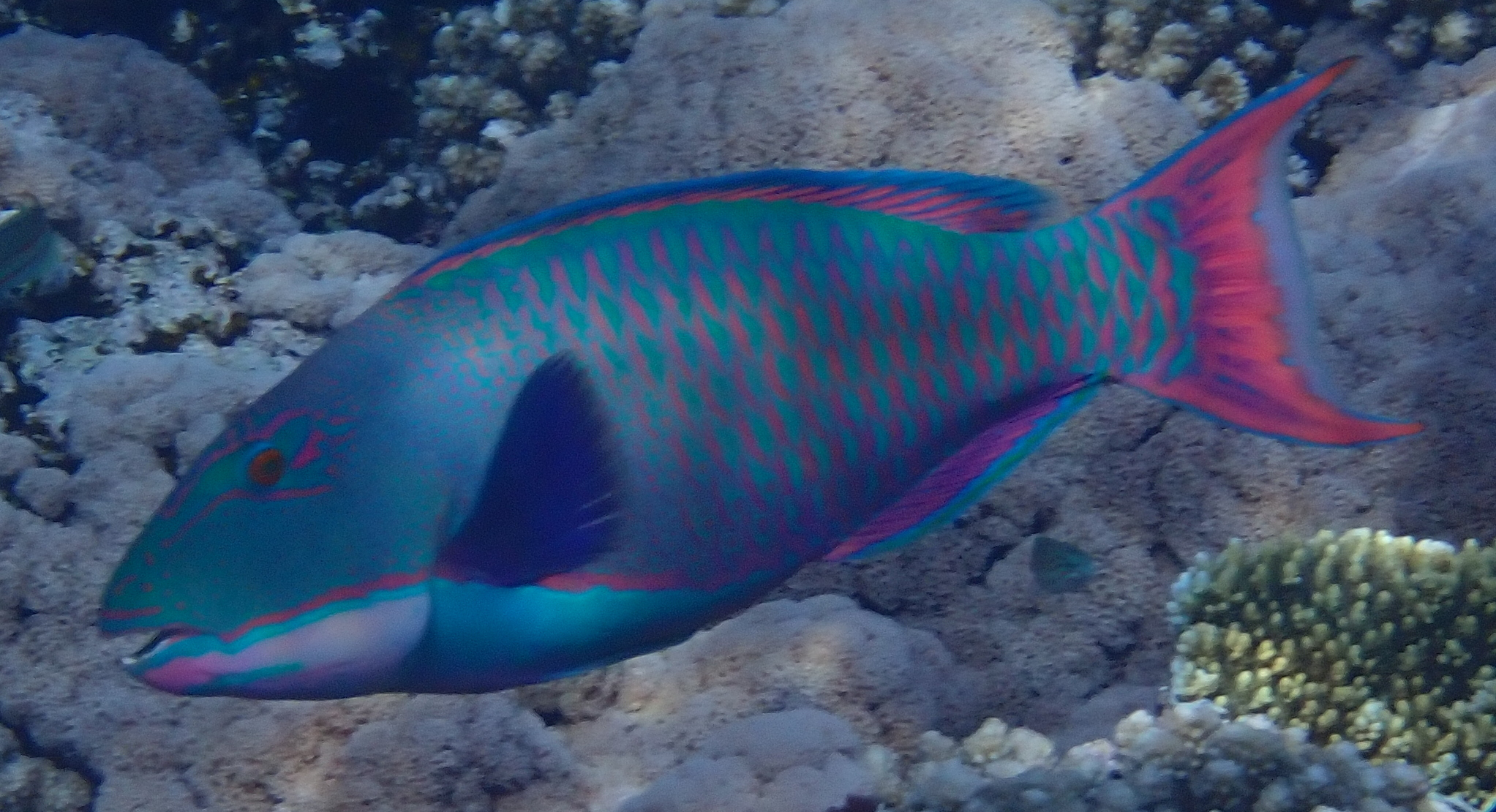
- Cetoscarus bicolor

Scientific classification
- Kingdom: Animalia
- Phylum: Chordata
- Class: Actinopterygii
- Order: Labriformes
- Family: Labridae
- Tribe: Scarini
- Genus: Cetoscarus; Smith, 1956

Type species
- Scarus pulchellus Rüppell, 1835

= Cetoscarus =

Genus of fishes

Cetoscarus is a genus of parrotfish native to the Indo-Pacific.

== Species ==
Species	Common name	Terminal phase	Initial phase
Cetoscarus bicolor (Rüppell, 1829)	bicolor parrotfish		
Cetoscarus ocellatus (Valenciennes, 1840)	spotted parrotfish		
