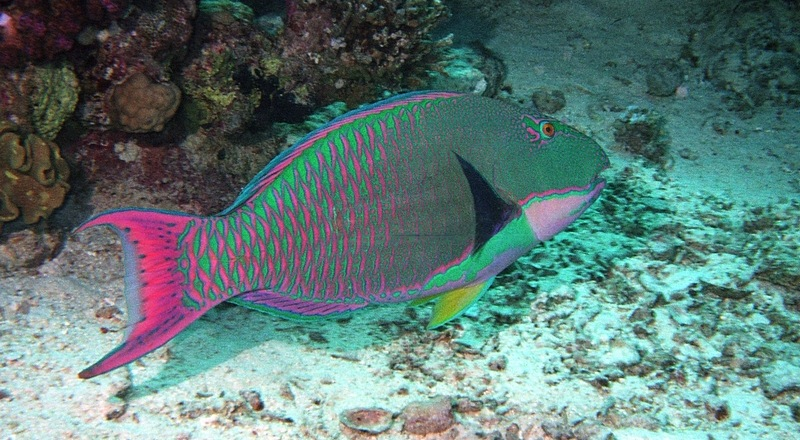

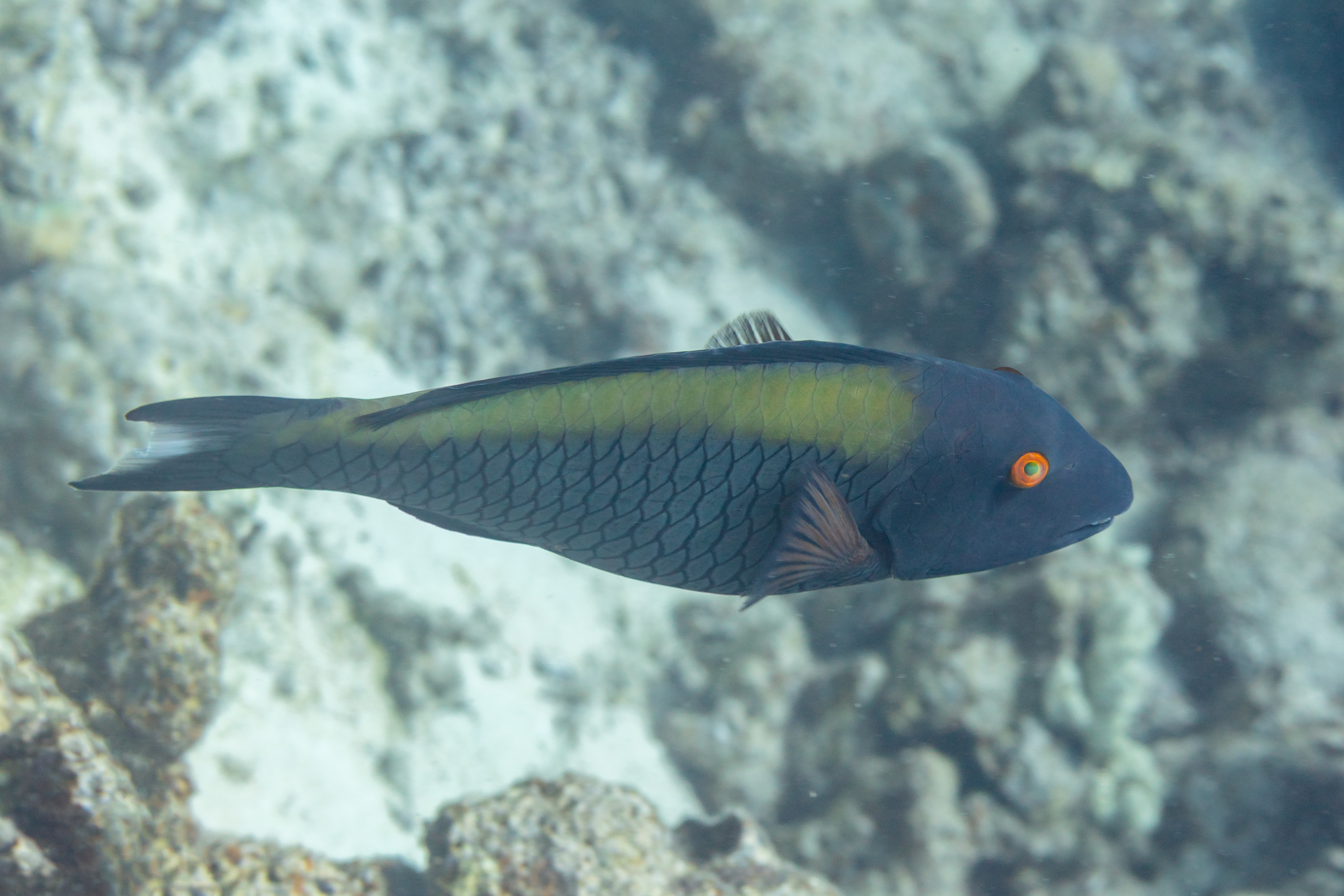
- Terminal phase (top), initial phase (bottom)

Conservation status
- Least Concern (IUCN 3.1)

Scientific classification
- Kingdom: Animalia
- Phylum: Chordata
- Class: Actinopterygii
- Division: Teleostei
- Order: Labriformes
- Family: Labridae
- Genus: Cetoscarus
- Species: C. bicolor

Binomial name
- Cetoscarus bicolor (Rüppell, 1829)
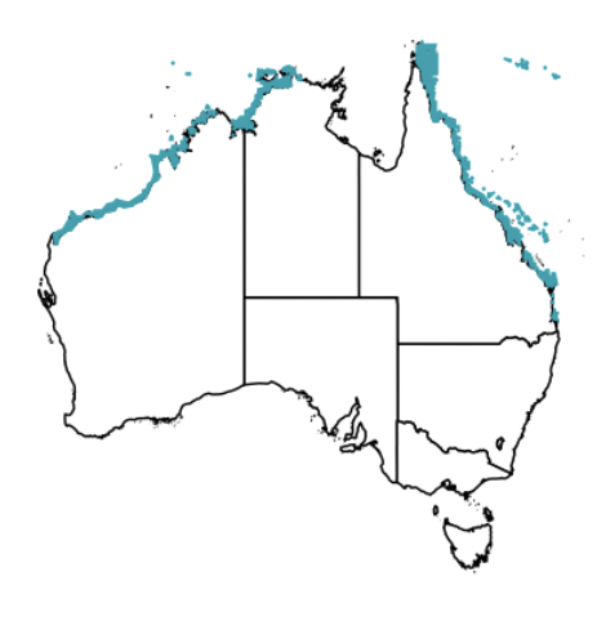

Synonyms
- List: Scarus bicolor Rüppell, 1829; Bolbometopon bicolor (Rüppell, 1829); Chlorurus bicolor (Rüppell, 1829); Scarus pulchellus Rüppell, 1835; Callyodon pulchellus (Rüppell, 1835); Cetoscarus pulchellus (Rüppell, 1835); Chlorurus pulchellus (Rüppell, 1835); Pseudoscarus nigripinnis Günther, 1867

= Cetoscarus bicolor =

Species of fish

Cetoscarus bicolor, commonly known as the bicolour parrotfish, is a species of fish in the family Scaridae. It is endemic to the Red Sea.

== Distribution and habitat ==
The genus Cetoscarus was historically monospecific; Cetoscarus bicolor and Cetoscarus ocellatus were formerly considered to be the same species. There are major molecular and morphological differences between the two. C. bicolor is associated with coral reefs. It usually can be found in lagoons and seaward reefs at depths between 1 and 30 m (3 ft 3 in and 98 ft 5 in). Small juveniles are usually found among dense coral and in algae-rich habitats. However, individuals have been found down to 40 meters, and they dive into the large coral systems in their geographical distribution. These areas offer them all the required conditions for feeding and surviving; there are lots of algae to eat and coral chunks to stay and reproduce.

Cetoscarus bicolor is a species with space use abilities that differ according to the life cycle stage the fish is at. For example, juvenile parrotfish are found in the thick coral sections or areas of vegetation, where they can access food and avoid predation. Juveniles are commonly associated with coral gardens and lagoons since their coloration is white, with a black spot on the dorsal fin and an orange stripe over the eye. Adults, meanwhile, prefer the outer parts of coral reefs or open reef areas, which they demarcate as their feeding grounds. These territories are the coral and rocky ground suitable for removing algae and biofilm from the reef using body scrapes, which is part of their diet.

It is hard to find information on the populations of this species but Pauly, and Froese indicate that there are healthy numbers in the Red Sea stretching region. However, the authors detected fluctuations in population densities. They called for more studies to define more precise rates of their modern population and their abilities to withstand certain kinds of stress in their surroundings. It is expected that with climate change and continued human interference, the health of the reefs on which Cetoscarus bicolor rely on will degrade over time. Ensuring the stability of the species and the overall balance of such fragile ecosystems as the Red Sea habitats means the necessity of the further continuation of the conservation programs directed at protecting the reefs.

== Description ==
It is among the largest parrotfishes, reaching a standard length of up to 80 cm (31 in). As in many of its relatives, it is a sequential hermaphrodite, starting as female (known as the initial phase) and then changing to male (the terminal phase). The initial phase is dark brown with a large cream patch on the upper part of the body. The terminal phase is very colorful, overall green with pink spotting to the body and edging to the fins. Juveniles are white with a black spot on the dorsal fin and an orange band through the eye. It is hence different from the adult phase, where they lose the black dot on their dorsal fin and as they mature their color shifts to a bright blue body, with a spotted face, and some pink/yellow highlights around the scales. Because of their pigmentation, juvenile Baltas are known as "black tooth" because they have dark bands and patches that distinguish them from their mature counterparts. Cetoscarus bicolor has a distinct color division between the two phases in its life cycle, which defines its appearance.

The development of sexual dimorphism is a sign of sexual maturity. Typically dark brown, juveniles and subadults have a large white patch on the dorsal region above the dorsal fin that will soon appear. When reaching the terminal phase, the body is sporadically studded with pink, the fins have bright pink edges, and the overall coloration turns bright green. Males in the terminal phase are generally noticeable and obvious due to this coloring.

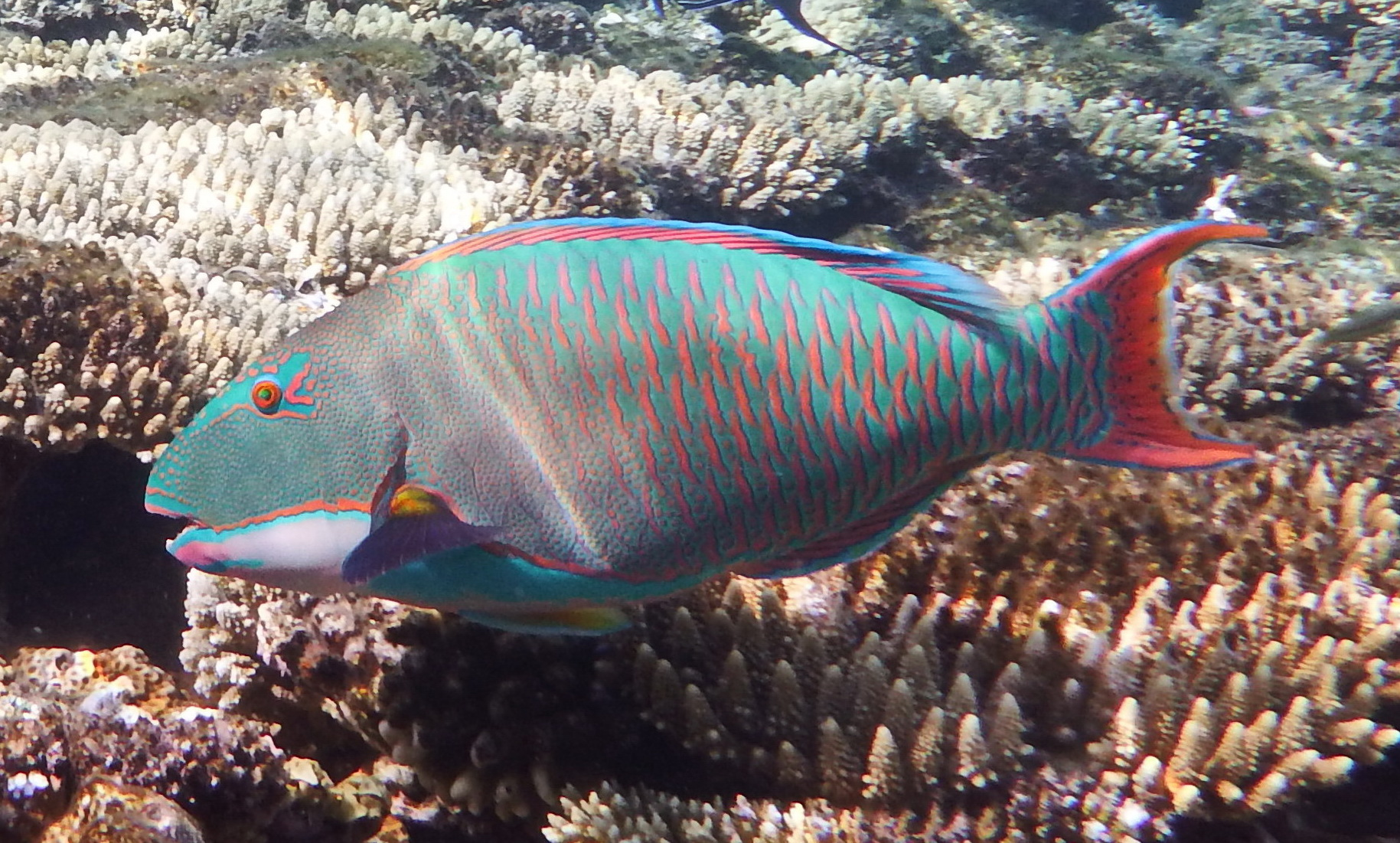
Terminal phase

During its lifetime, this fish changes sex twice and very large females change sex to become brightly coloured males. This fish is a sequential hermaphrodite. Molecular data and external morphology investigations have demonstrated that this process, together with sexual size and color differentiation, is typical of the species. Cetoscarus bicolor belongs to the same family as Cetoscarus ocellatus, but research using DNA information and morphological variations distinguishes the two species. Highlighting Cetoscarus bicolor's uniqueness among its genus members, Cetoscarus ocellatus has a less vivid coloring.

== Behavior ==
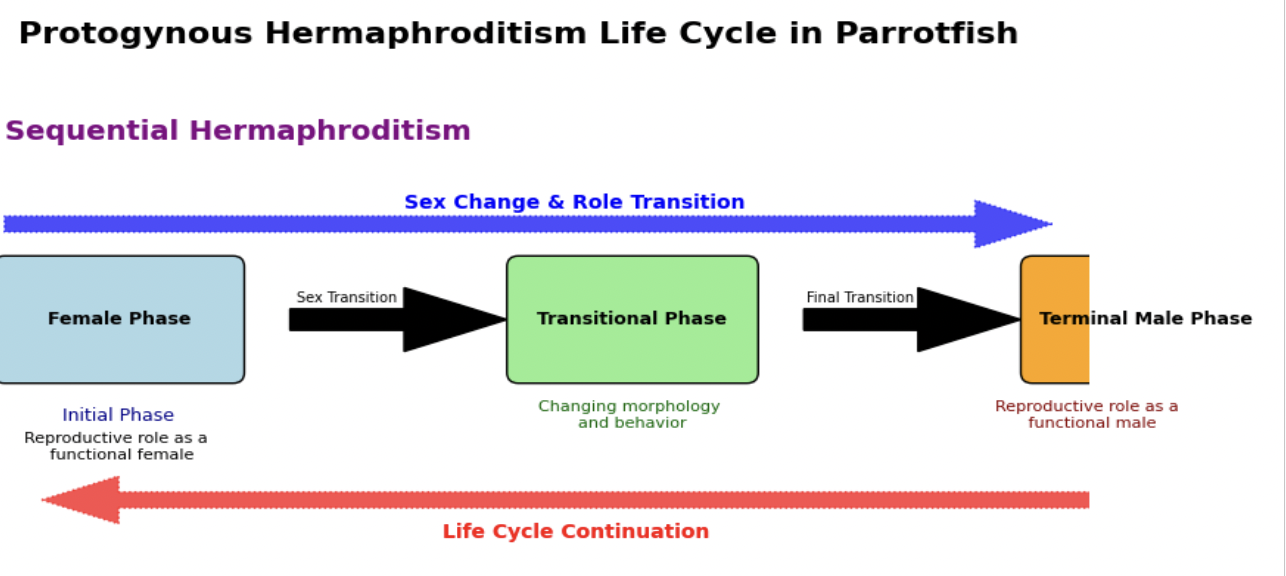
Sex change in Cetoscarus bicolor

As in other parrotfish species, males are territorial. They are born female in a female-dominated civilization and can only change their sex as they mature, usually as they get older. This change is influenced by social and environmental factors. When there is not a male in the group, activation takes place. Cetoscarus bicolor is sexually mature at around three years of age, and the size distribution for a given population tends to show that the largest fish are male due to this alternative gonochorism. This system has significant biological potency in controlling breeding populations because it has a flexible breeding structure that can cope with population changes. This is especially beneficial in reef environments since population numbers and sex differentiation can change due to typical disturbances and predation risks.

== Biology ==
Cetoscarus bicolor mainly feeds on algae, and the species is known to scrape off the rocks and corals using the bottom part of its beak-like dental plates. Cetoscarus bicolor feeds on this algae which could otherwise be a thick layer on coral reefs, overall denying light and photosynthesis to the coral symbiont, as stated by Green and Bellwood in 2019. Parrotfish species are usually considered reef 'gardens' since they help maintain algae that threatens to overgrow the reefs. They play a role in establishing grounds on which corals can grow, creating room for reefs to support biological diversity. Furthermore, they feed to form fine sand through bioerosion because they graze on rock, and corals break them down. While feeding on coral and rocks, it chews the rock so hard on these materials in digesting it and expelling it as sand, this process is known as sediment production. The process discussed above leads to the formation of sediment that is then expelled like sand to enhance sand formation in the reef environment and marine life in general. Overall, Cetoscarus bicolor enhances coral health and, while not depicted directly, influences changes in the reef framework. Together, the ability of Cetoscarus bicolor to control algae and generate sediment makes this species central to coral reef ecosystems, contributing to the overall biological and resilience of the coral itself.

== Conservation status ==
Cetoscarus bicolor is categorized as least concern on the IUCN Red List, though it is completely symbiotic with coral reef ecosystems. Because of its dependence on them, the species is at risk as a result of additional environmental stressors brought on by climate change. One of the major effects of global warming is coral bleaching, particularly for Cetoscarus bicolor, whose habitat or food source is severely degraded. This parrotfish's food supplies are coral-dependent algae resources, which die during bleaching. This causes catastrophic coral death and the loss of reef architectural complexity, which is essential for many marine creatures, including this parrotfish.

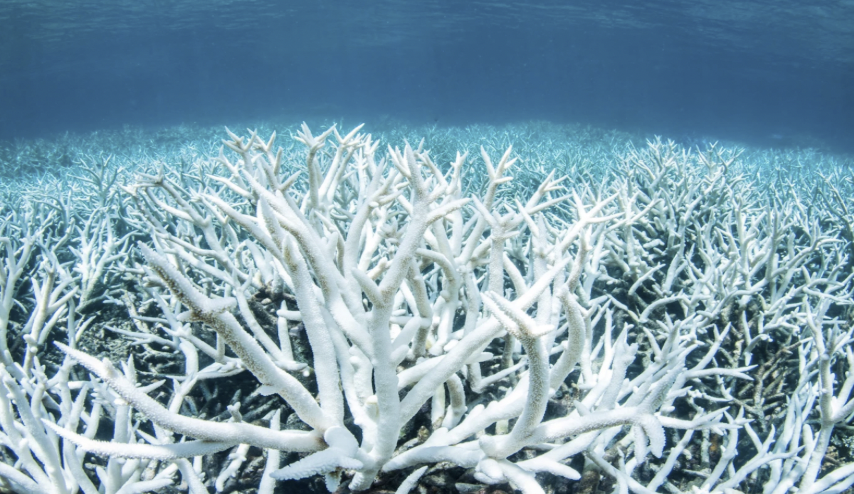
Bleached coral reef

In addition to climate change impacts, Cetoscarus bicolor faces other risks, such as pollution, overfishing, and coastal development. However, pollutants such as farm runoff contain higher nutrients, which can further fuel the coral-harming algae and degrade water quality, further intensifying pressure on the coral systems.

Given these threats, continuous effort must be put in place to protect coral reefs and ensure that Cetoscarus bicolor and all other species that depend on the coral can continue to exist in the future. Some of the current strategies include measures aimed at cutting down greenhouse gas emissions, combating climate change, and other pointed measures involved in controlling pollutant discharges and uncontrolled fishing activities. Current and future perspectives of climate change are being addressed by organizations like the IUCN or local governments, and they are paying attention to the ecosystem's ability to adapt with change; efforts are being made to strengthen coral reefs against climate change. In the case that we follow these efforts, the threats above can slowly diminish, if not it can cause a substantial decrease in the Cetoscarus bicolor population and affecting the diverse coral species and their ecosystems.
